= Suicide attack =

Violent tactic resulting in the attacker's intentional death

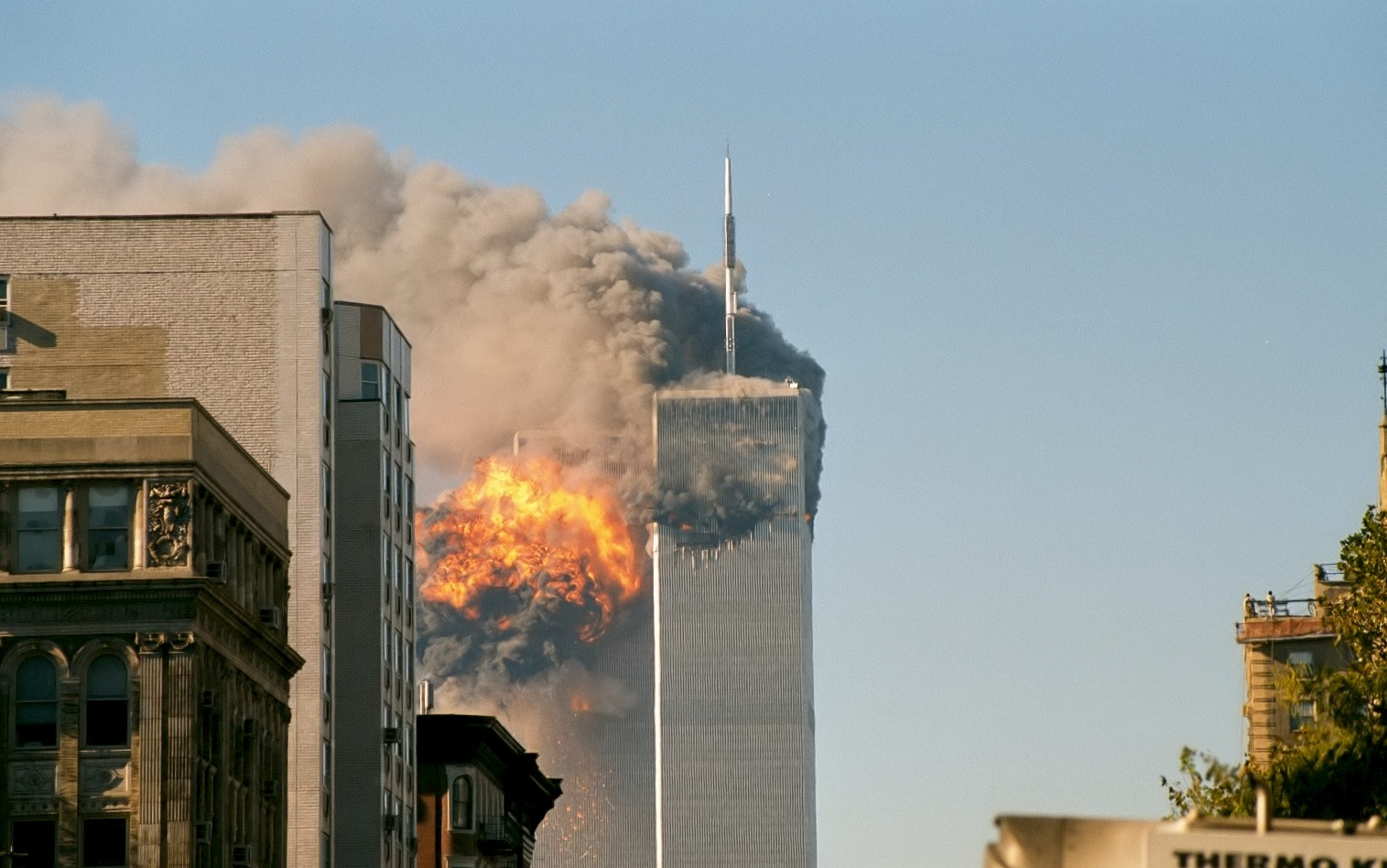
The hijacker-pilot Marwan al-Shehhi carried out a suicide dive on the South Tower (left) with United Airlines Flight 175 during the September 11 attacks, New York City (Note: The North Tower (right), seen burning in the picture, had been hit by a suicide attack 17 minutes earlier by Mohammed Atta, also from the same group, flying American Airlines Flight 11.)

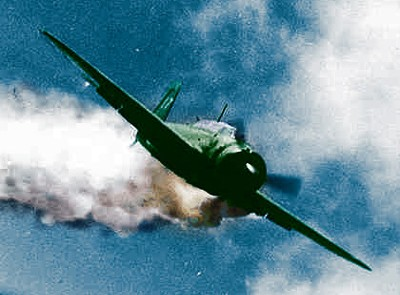
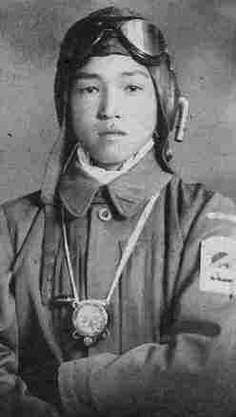
Two Kamikaze pilots: Lt. Yoshinori Yamaguchi's Yokosuka D4Y (left) in a suicide dive against USS Essex on 25 November 1944 and pilot Yukio Araki (right) died in a suicide attack on 27 May 1945, at age 17

A suicide attack (also known by a wide variety of other names, see below) is a deliberate attack in which the perpetrators intentionally end their own lives as part of the attack. These attacks are a form of murder–suicide that is often associated with terrorism or war. When the attackers are labelled as terrorists, the attacks are sometimes referred to as an act of suicide terrorism. Military use of suicide is not directly regulated by international law, but suicide attacks sometimes violate prohibitions against perfidy or targeting civilians. Suicide attacks have occurred in various contexts, ranging from military campaigns—such as the Japanese kamikaze pilots during World War II (1944–1945)—to more contemporary Islamic terrorist campaigns—including the September 11 attacks in 2001. Suicide attacks have been used by a wide range of political ideologies, from far-right (Japan and Germany in WWII) to far-left (such as the PKK and JRA).

== Definition and terminology ==
=== Kamikaze ===
Kamikaze was a term initially used for Japanese suicide pilots in World War II, but is occasionally used in other contexts.

For example, the 1972 Lod Airport massacre in Israel by the Japanese Red Army (JRA) was labelled by some reports at the time a "Kamikaze" attack, but others have criticized the label, including the surviving attacker's interpreter. The Kamikaze were a unit of suicide bombers of the Empire of Japan in WWII, which had a very different ideology to the JRA. Researchers from Duke University described the JRA's motives as "rooted in anti-imperialism, anti-colonialism, and anti-capitalism". In more recent reports the 1972 JRA attack on Lod airport is described in modern terms such as "suicide attack" and "suicide mission", even when referring to the attacker who survived. All three militants intended to die, but one survived. He confessed and hoped to be quickly executed, but some attribute this to retrospective "survivor guilt".

=== Suicide bombing ===
The term "suicide bombing" dates back to at least 1940 when a New York Times article mentioned the term in relation to German tactics. Less than two years later, the New York Times referred to a Japanese kamikaze attempt on an American carrier as a "suicide bombing". In 1945, The Times of London referred to a kamikaze plane as a "suicide-bomb". Two years later, it referred to a new British pilot-less, radio-controlled rocket missile as originally designed "as a counter-measure to the Japanese 'suicide-bomber'."

=== Labelling attacks as suicide ===
The definition of "suicide" in this context is also a matter of debate.

Suicide terrorism itself has been defined by Ami Pedahzur, a professor at the University of Haifa, as "violent actions perpetrated by people who are aware that the odds they will return alive are close to zero". Other sources exclude from their work "suicidal" or high risk attacks, such as the Lod Airport massacre or a "reckless charge in battle". Despite the Lod Airport massacre being explicitly planned as a suicide attack, and modern mainstream Israeli and international media describing the event as a "suicide attack" or "suicide mission". Yoram Schweitzer, from the International Institute for Counter-Terrorism (an Israeli think tank), focuses only on true "suicide attacks", where the odds of survival are not "close to zero" but required to be zero, because "the perpetrator's ensured death is a precondition for the success of his mission".

The narrower definition would also exclude the actions of groups such as those by the Hashishiyeen, by the Moro juramentado, and in Aceh during WWII (see below). Adam Lankford also excludes from the definition are "proxy bombings", which may have political goals and be designed to look like a suicide bombing. The difference is that the "proxy" is forced to carry a bomb under threat, or the proxy isn't fully aware that they are delivering a bomb that will kill them. The definition also generally excludes mass shootings in which the perpetrators commit suicide, as the shooter committing suicide is a separate act from shooting their victims.

Further distinction is how many of such shootings are driven by personal and psychological reasons, rather than political, social or religious motives, such as the Columbine High School massacre, the Virginia Tech shooting or Sandy Hook Elementary School shooting in the United States. However, in 1999 the Columbine High School massacre was widely labelled as a suicide attack: both attackers shot themselves, but they planned the attack as a bombing. It is also a common trope that Muslim attackers are defined as terrorists while others are defined as mentally ill.

It may not always be clear to investigators which type of killing is which, since suicide attack campaigns sometimes use proxy bombers, as alleged in Iraq, or manipulate the vulnerable to become bombers. Adam Lankford, also argues that the motivation to kill and be killed connects some suicide attackers more closely to "suicidal rampage" murderers than is commonly thought.

=== Religious terminology for attackers and victims ===
All Abrahamic religions forbid suicide. Suicide and suicide attempts have been decriminalised in most of the western world, but remain criminalised in some countries, such as Afghanistan, Nigeria, Palestine, and others. Terminology relating to this sin or crime is used by Jews, Christians, and Muslims to condemn suicide attackers (see also above), different terminology is usually used to describe self sacrifice that they believe is justified, including actions their enemies label suicide attacks (see below).

==== Martyrdom of attackers and victims ====
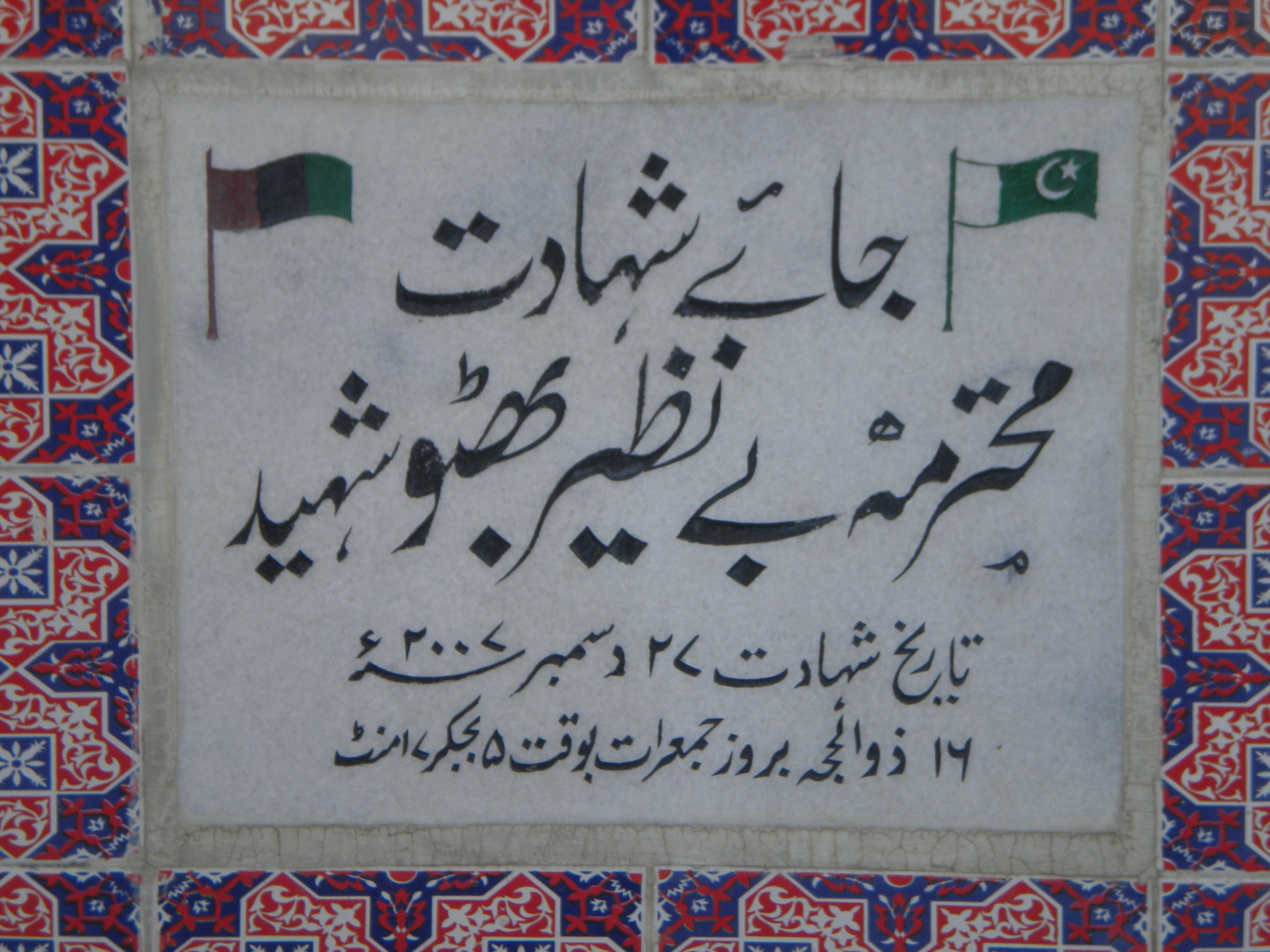
Plaque marking the location of the assassination of Benazir Bhutto, written in Urdu. Translation: Place of Martyrdom, Ms. Benazir Bhutto martyred. Benazir Bhutto was killed by a suicide terrorist in 2007. (Note: Named in honour of the martyr (shaheed) Benazir Bhutto, after she was assassinated by a suicide bomber in 2007: Shaheed Benazir Bhutto Women University; Mohtarma Benazir Bhutto Shaheed Medical College; Shaheed Mohtarma Benazir Bhutto Medical University; Shaheed Benazir Bhutto Medical College; Shaheed Benazir Bhutto City University in Karachi, Sindh; Shaheed Benazir Bhutto Dewan University in Karachi, Sindh; Shaheed Benazir Bhutto University (Shaheed Benazirabad) in Nawabshah, Sindh; Shaheed Benazir Bhutto University of Veterinary & Animal Sciences in Sakrand, Sindh; Benazir Bhutto Shaheed University (Karachi) in Karachi, Sindh; Shaheed Benazir Bhutto University (Sheringal) in Dir, Khyber Pakhtunkhwa.; Shaheed Benazir Bhutto Women University (previously known as the Frontier Women University, in Peshawar, Khyber Pakhtunkhwa))

Among Muslims, secular Arabs, and related cultures, the term martyr or shaheed has a broad meaning and can refer to leaders who have been assassinated or executed, civilian casualties of war, and combatants who did not intend to die.

Victims of suicide bombings and the bombers are both commonly referred to as martyrs, by opposing groups, or when referring to different attacks. Some Arabic speaking militant groups and their supporters call suicide attacks "martyrdom operations" (Arabic: للعمليات الاستشهادية, romanized: aleamaliaat alistishhadia). The concept of martyrdom in Islam is broad including people who died in plagues and women who died in childbirth, as well as fallen combatants who did not intend to die. According to Israeli academic Assaf Moghadam, the term "martyrdom operation" has been used by Hamas, Al-Aqsa Martyrs' Brigades, Fatah's Al Aqsa Martyrs Brigades, and other Palestinian factions. The term "martyrdom operation" was also used in March 2003 by the Iraqi administration to refer to suicide attacks on invading troops during the 2003 Iraq war, and in particular their promise to retake the Baghdad airport.

Victims of suicide attacks are also referred to as martyrs by a wide variety of cultures. Benazir Bhutto, the leader of the Pakistan People's Party, is the most famous example of a progressive Muslim who is regarded as a martyr after being murdered in a suicide attack. Bhutto was assassinated in 2007 by a teenage Islamic extremist. After her death, many things in Pakistan, mostly related to education, were named or renamed in her honour, referring to her by the title "shaheed" (martyr).

When an ISIS-inspired suicide bomber blew himself up at Rafah crossing in 2017, he was described by locals and in Arabic package media as a suicide bomber (Arabic: فجر انتحاري or الانتحاري), not a martyr. (Note: though sometimes use a related word Arabic: شهدت, lit. 'deceased', example: Arabic: وأفاد شهود عيان بأن القتيل من سكان منطقة "تل السلطان" في رفح، وهو من نشطاء جماعة سلفية تنتمي فكريا إلى تنظيم الدولة الإسلامية., lit. 'Eyewitnesses reported that the deceased was a resident of the "Tel al-Sultan" area in Rafah, and was an activist in a Salafist group that ideologically belongs to the Islamic State organization.') The border guard who was killed attempting to stop him crossing into Egypt, a member of Hamas' Qassam Brigades, was described in official statements and Arabic language media as a martyr (Arabic: الشهيد نضال الجعفري, romanized: al-Shaheed Nidal al-Jaafari) and he became a martyr (Arabic: استشهاد, romanized: Istishhad, Arabic: استشهاد نضال جمعة, lit. 'Martyrdom of Nidal al-Jaafari')., some international media, and the bomber's family. His family condemned him, describing ISIS member's action as completely criminal and anti-Palestine, and announced they would not be holding funeral services for the ISIS suicide-bomber. Gaza's clans referred to the bombing as suicide terrorism (Arabic: العمل الإرهابي الانتحاري). The bomber was also posthumously disowned by family, who announced they would be holding no funeral.

==== Biblical references ====
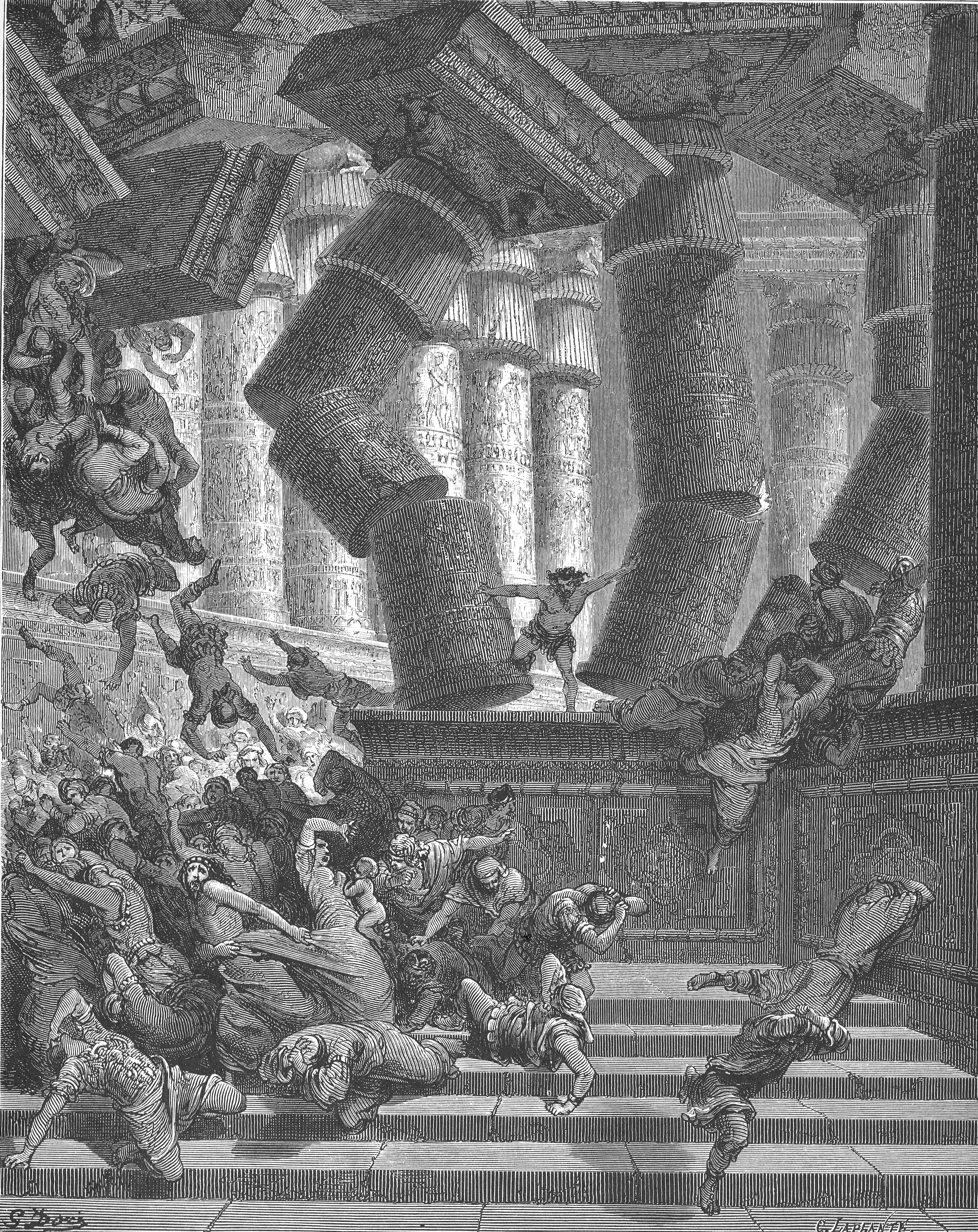
Illustration of Samson by Gustave Doré. (Note: Gustave Doré was the illustrator of the Bible that was handed to the British prison guard in 1947, by an Etzel militant who blew himself up moments later.)

In Israel, Samson's words, in Judges 16:30 (Hebrew: תמות נפשי עם פלשתים, lit. 'let me die with the Philistines', Biblical Hebrew: תָּמוֹת נַפְשִׁי עִם-פְּלִשְׁתִּים)., are quoted as a justification for acts of self sacrifice in battle. The same biblical quote is cited in both praise and criticism of this approach to warfare. Prior to the establishment of the State of Israel, this story was cited by two of the anti-British pre-state militant groups in reference to their premeditated plans. One leader claimed that two militants who blew themselves up had not committed suicide, as such, due to allegedly mitigating circumstances. Their modern critics claim the situation itself was largely self-inflicted.

Some within Israel view the Samson in a very negative light. People from Christian backgrounds, or people who live within majority-Christian communities, have carried out suicide attacks in Eastern Europe, Lebanon, the United States, New Zealand, and elsewhere (see below). They have usually not used religious language to explain or justify their actions. Most have been members or supporters of secular movements, or they have perpetrated isolated attacks and they did not give lengthy reasons as to why they perpetrated the attacks. However, in 1959 in Houston, Texas, Paul Harold Orgeron reportedly mentioned "the will of God" before detonating a suitcase bomb that killed himself and 5 other people at Poe Elementary School.

==== Non-Abrahamic religions ====
Kuyili – who killed herself in a suicide attack in 1780, see below – is revered as Theepaanchi Amman, meaning "the goddess who jumped into fire", in Muthupatti village near Sivagangai, Tamil Nadu, based on local oral traditions.

==== Opferanschlag (sacrifice bombing) ====
In German-speaking areas the term "sacrifice bombing" (German: Opferanschlag) was proposed in 2012 by German scholar Arata Takeda. This is different from the German word used by Nazi Germany to refer to self sacrifice attacks.

=== Labelling attacks as terrorism ===
Suicide attacks include both "suicide terrorism" and attacks targeting combatants. "Terrorism" is often defined as any action "intended to cause death or serious bodily harm to civilians or non-combatants" for the purpose of intimidation. This definition is often not used consistently; even those claiming to define terrorism this way sometimes describe attacks on their own military as "terrorism", while attacks on civilians by allied state actors are almost never called terrorism.

An alternative definition provided by Jason Burke, a journalist who has lived among Islamic militants, suggests that most define terrorism as "the use or threat of serious violence" to advance some kind of "cause", stressing that terrorism is a tactic. This definition is often referred to by the euphemism "political violence".

Academic Fred Halliday has written that assigning the descriptor of "terrorist" or "terrorism" to the actions of a group is a tactic used by states to deny "legitimacy" and "rights to protest and rebel". Israeli diplomacy has been very influential in defining terrorism as a concept. This was largely led by Menachem Begin, who himself has been labelled as a terrorist leader, as commander of the Irgun militant group before Israel was recognized as a nation state by Western powers.

=== Homicide bombing ===
Some efforts have been made to replace the term "suicide bombing" with "homicide bombing", based on the assertion that "homicide" is a more apt adjective than "suicide" since the primary purpose of such a bombing is to kill other people. The only major media outlets to use it were the Fox News Channel and the New York Post, both of which are owned by News Corporation and have since mostly abandoned the term. Robert Goldney, a professor emeritus at the University of Adelaide, has argued in favor of the term "homicide bomber". Goldney argued that studies show that there is little in common between people who blow themselves up intending to kill as many people as possible in the process and actual suicide victims. Fox News producer Dennis Murray argued that a suicidal act should be reserved for a person who does something to kill only themselves. CNN producer Christa Robinson argued that the term "homicide bomber" was not specific enough, stating that "A homicide bomber could refer to someone planting a bomb in a trash can".

== Background ==
Initially, these attacks primarily targeted military, police, and public officials. This approach continued with groups like Al-Qaeda, which combined mass civilian targets with political leadership. While only a few suicide attacks occurred between 1945 and 1980, between 1981 and September 2015 a total of 4,814 suicide attacks were carried out in over 40 countries, resulting in over 45,000 deaths. The global frequency of these attacks increased from an average of three per year in the 1980s to roughly one per month in the 1990s, almost one per week from 2001 to 2003, and roughly one per day from 2003 to 2015. In 2019, there were 149 suicide bombings in 24 countries, carried out by 236 individuals. These attacks resulted in 1,850 deaths and 3,660 injuries.

=== Related actions ===
==== Suicide protests ====
Suicide is sometimes used as an extreme act of protest, without intent to cause tangible damage to the opponent. Romas Kalanta was a 19-year-old Lithuanian student who self-immolated in 1972 to protest against the Soviet regime in Lithuania, sparking the 1972 unrest in Lithuania; another 13 people self-immolated in that same year. Hunger strikes are another use of self harm, and actual or potential suicide, that is used by some militant groups.

==== Self-sacrifice to prevent other casualties ====
During the 2006 Lebanon War, IDF Major Roi Klein and his unit took part in the Battle of Bint Jbeil. During a Hezbollah ambush, a hand grenade was thrown over the wall that was between Hezbollah militants and Klein and his unit. Klein jumped on the live grenade and muffled the explosion with his body. The soldiers reported that Klein recited the Jewish prayer, Shema Yisrael, as he jumped on the grenade. He then handed over his encoded radio to another officer, who took command of the force, and died. According to The Telegraph he yelled "Long live Israel", although this was probably a misinterpretation of "Shema Yisrael" (שמע ישראל).

==== Preventing capture ====
During the First Jewish–Roman War, the letter of the Sicarii determined that the people in the besieged city of Masada should commit mass suicide, and even murder family members, to avoid capture during the Siege of Masada. The story of Masada is prominent in Israeli culture. The Sicarii Jewish sect are also sometimes described as carrying out "suicidal" attacks against their enemies (see below).

Other than as a way to cause enemy casualties, another situation in which some militaries and related bodies (such as intelligence agencies) encourage their own members to commit suicide is to avoid being captured by the enemy. The concept also often includes the use of intentional friendly fire. Either to avoid disclose of military secrets, avoid the need for a prisoner exchange, or for more intangible ideological motives. Individuals are encouraged by a perception that capture is a fate worse than death, and the likelihood of torture is strongly emphasised in internal propaganda. Sometimes, to the point that even civilians embrace the concept of dying (or killing people on their own side) to avoid capture.

In some cases, special forces of Western militaries have been provided with suicide pills to take if they are at risk of capture. Some militaries of nation states avoid equipping their troops with any means specifically designed to facilitate suicide, but imply that soldiers are obliged to resort to extreme measures to avoid capture including taking their own lives, or killing their comrades, with whatever means are available. Hand grenades have been repeatedly used or recommended. In 1952, three Chinese soldiers reportedly killed themselves with hand grenades to avoid capture. Military commanders have reportedly recommended explosives such as hand grenades as a means of suicide, for the advantage of killing as many of the would-be captors as possible, thus converting the situation into an improvised suicide attack.

=== Attackers killed by their opponents ===
Some sources define "suicide terrorism" and "suicide attack" broadly to include attackers who are killed by other people. At the opposite extreme, militant leaders of from Jewish or Islamic militant groups – both religions that forbid suicide – claim that directly causing one's own death sometimes is not suicide (see above: suicide and religious terminology). However, followers of these religiously derived ideologies define their enemies as suicidal, even if their opponent uses the same technique, such as when an ISIS-linked suicide bomber killed al-Qassam border guard Nidal al-Jaafari at Rafah crossing (see above). During the colonial era and up to World War II, Muslims in Aceh and Moro, now part of Indonesia and the Philippines, attacked much more powerful opponents – principally the Dutch, the Japanese, and the Americans – despite near certain death. Some authors have characterised these as predecessors of modern suicide bombings. Other sources say that suicide bombings in places like the Philippines arrose only recently, due to foreign influence from international cultists such as ISIS.

==== Sicarii (first century AD) ====
The Sicarii Jewish sect are sometimes described as carrying out "suicidal" attacks against their enemies. Riaz Hassan said that the first-century AD Jewish Sicarii sect carried out "suicidal missions to kill" Hellenized Jews they considered immoral collaborators. An article in BBC Arabic originally called the Sicarii the first group to carry out suicide attacks. In September 2023, over a year after initial publication, this attracted controversy in English language Israeli media, when a complaint led to a change in the article. The Jerusalem Post classified the article under "antisemtitism". The Sicarii sect play a central role in Israeli mythology. The Sicarii killed themselves and their families to avoid capture (see above), but in their attacks they were killed by their opponents. The Sicarii carried out attacks knowing it would lead to their own executions. The revised BBC article claimed the first suicide attacks were by the Order of Assassins, who are also killed by their opponents (see next section).

==== Order of Assassins (1090 to 1275) ====
The Order of Assassins (Arabic: حَشّاشِین, romanized: Hashishiyeen; Persian: حشاشين, romanized: Ḥaššāšīn) were from a sect of Ismaili Shi'a Muslims. They assassinated two Caliphs, as well as many viziers, Sultans, and Crusade leaders over 300 years, before being annihilated by Mongol invaders. Hashishiyeen were known for targeting the powerful, using the dagger as a weapon (rather than something safer for the assassin such as a crossbow), and for not attempting to escape after completing their killing.

==== Moro juramentado ====
Juramentado, in Philippine history, refers to a male Moro swordsman (from the Tausug tribe of Sulu) who attacked and killed targeted occupying and invading police and soldiers. Death was expected, and considered martyrdom, undertaken as a form of jihad.

Moro people who performed suicide attacks were called mag-sabil, and the suicide attacks were known as parang-sabil. The Spanish called them juramentados. The idea of the juramentado was considered part of jihad in the Moros' Islamic religion. During an attack, a juramentado would throw himself at his targets and kill them with bladed weapons such as barongs and kris until he was killed. The Moros performed juramentado suicide attacks against the Spanish in the Spanish–Moro conflict of the 16th to the 19th centuries, against the Americans in the Moro Rebellion from 1899 to 1913), and against the Japanese in World War II.

The Moro (Spanish: juramentados) launched suicide attacks on the Japanese, Spanish, Americans and Filipinos, but did not attack the non-Muslim Chinese as the Chinese were not considered enemies of the Moro people. The Japanese responded to these suicide attacks by massacring all known family members and relatives of the attackers.

According to historian Stephan Dale, the Moro were not the only culture who carried out suicide attacks "in their fight against Western hegemony and colonial rule". In the 18th century, suicide tactics were used on the Malabar Coast of southwestern India, and in Aceh in Northern Sumatra as well (see above).

==== Aceh War (1873–1904) ====
The former Dutch East Indies (dark red) within the Empire of Japan (light red) at its furthest extent

Location of Aceh on a map of present day Indonesia.

Muslim Acehnese from the Aceh Sultanate performed suicide attacks known as parang-sabil against Dutch invaders during the Aceh War (1873–1904). It was considered part of personal jihad in Islam. The Dutch called it Atjèh-moord, (lit. Aceh murder). The Acehnese work of literature the Hikayat Perang Sabil provided the background and reasoning for the Atjèh-moord as Acehnese suicide attacks upon the Dutch. The Indonesian translations of the Dutch terms are Aceh bodoh, Aceh pungo, Aceh gila, or Aceh mord.

==== Aceh in WWII ====
Atjèh-moord was also used against the Japanese by the Acehnese during the Japanese occupation of Aceh. The Acehnese Ulama (Islamic Scholars) fought against both the Dutch and the Japanese, revolting against the Dutch in February 1942 and against Japan in November 1942. The revolt was led by the All-Aceh Religious Scholars' Association (PUSA). The Japanese suffered 18 dead in the uprising while they slaughtered either up to 100 or over 120 Acehnese. The revolt happened in Bayu and was centred around Tjot Plieng village's religious school. During the revolt, the Japanese troops armed with mortars and machine guns were charged by sword wielding Acehnese under Teungku Abduldjalil (Tengku Abdul Djalil) in Buloh Gampong Teungah on 10 November and Tjot Plieng on 13 November. In May 1945 the Acehnese rebelled again.

==== Disposable use of troops during WWI and WWII ====
Supreme Allied Commander Lord Mountbatten claimed high casualties were justified during the Dieppe Raid, "For every man that died at Dieppe, ten were saved on D-Day". From one frito of twelve (11 Canadians and one British), only two returned alive, the others were killed or captured. One of the survivors was a British radar expert, who had been given a cyanide pill to take if he was captured.

==== Suicide by cop ====
A woman attempting suicide by cop in Flagler County, Florida

Suicide by cop, also known as suicide by police or law-enforcement-assisted suicide, is a term used to define a death, intended as suicide, for which a person attempts to provoke police. The phenomenon, as described in some sources, involves an allegedly suicidal person deliberately behaving in a threatening manner with intent to provoke law enforcement to kill them. The concept arose in the United States. The terminology has now spread to other places such as Canada, Australia, and non-English-speaking countries such as Austria.

== First suicide attacks (attackers who killed themselves) ==
Several different events have been described as the first suicide attack in different sources.

The oldest story that is widely described as a suicide attack in modern sources is the biblical story of Samson's destruction of the Philistine temple in Gaza in Judges 16:30. A study by German scholar Arata Takeda analyzes analogous behavior represented in literary texts from the antiquity through the 20th century, these being Ajax, Samson Agonistes, The Robbers, and The Just Assassins. The study concluded "that suicide bombings are not the expressions of specific cultural peculiarities or exclusively religious fanaticisms. Instead, they represent a strategic option of the desperately weak who strategically disguise themselves under the mask of apparent strength, terror, and invincibility". Other writers have also interpreted Samson's death as a suicide attack.

An article in BBC Arabic claimed the Sicarii were the first group to carry out suicide attacks. In September 2023 the BBC responded to a complaint, deleted the Sicarii and reworded the second example so that the revised article called the Order of Assassins (Ismaeli Shia) the first. However, both groups were killed by their opponents (see above).

=== Arnold von Winkelried (1386 in Switzerland) ===
Arnold von Winkelried was considered a hero in the Swiss struggle for independence for sacrificing himself at the Battle of Sempach in 1386.

=== Kuyili (1780 in India) ===
In 1780, an Indian woman named Kuyili applied ghee and oil onto her body and set herself ablaze. She then jumped into an armoury of the East India Company, causing it to explode. This suicide attack helped to secure victory for her queen, Velu Nachiyar, in the battle. Historical evidence about her life is scarce, relying primarily on folk songs and oral histories due to her marginalized Arunthathiyar or Sambavar background.

=== 17th- and 19th-century Dutch ===
In the late 17th century, Qing official Yu Yonghe recorded that injured Dutch soldiers fighting against Koxinga's forces for control of Taiwan in 1661 would use gunpowder to blow up both themselves and their opponents rather than be taken prisoner. However, Yu may have confused such suicidal tactics with the standard Dutch military practice of undermining and blowing up overrun positions, which almost cost Koxinga his life during the Siege of Fort Zeelandia.

On 5 February 1831, during the Belgian Revolution, a gale blew a Dutch gunboat under the command of Jan van Speyk into the quay of the port of Antwerp. As the ship was stormed by Belgians, van Speyk refused to surrender, instead igniting the ship's gunpowder with either his gun or cigar, blowing up the ship. The explosion killed 28 out of the 31 crewmen and an unknown number of Belgians.

=== Ignaty Grinevitsky (1881) and others in Russia ===
A Russian man named Ignaty Grinevitsky (also spelled: Ignacy Hryniewiecki) is sometimes described as the first known suicide bomber. The invention of dynamite in the 1860s presented revolutionary and terrorist groups in Europe with a weapon nearly 20 times more powerful than gunpowder. However, using dynamite required overcoming the technical challenges of detonating it at the right time. One solution was to use a human trigger, which was the technique used to assassinate Tsar Alexander II of Russia in 1881. A would-be suicide bomber killed Russian Minister of the Interior Vyacheslav von Plehve, in St Petersburg in 1904, but survived with major injuries.

=== Personal disputes before WWII ===
==== 1905 in New Zealand ====
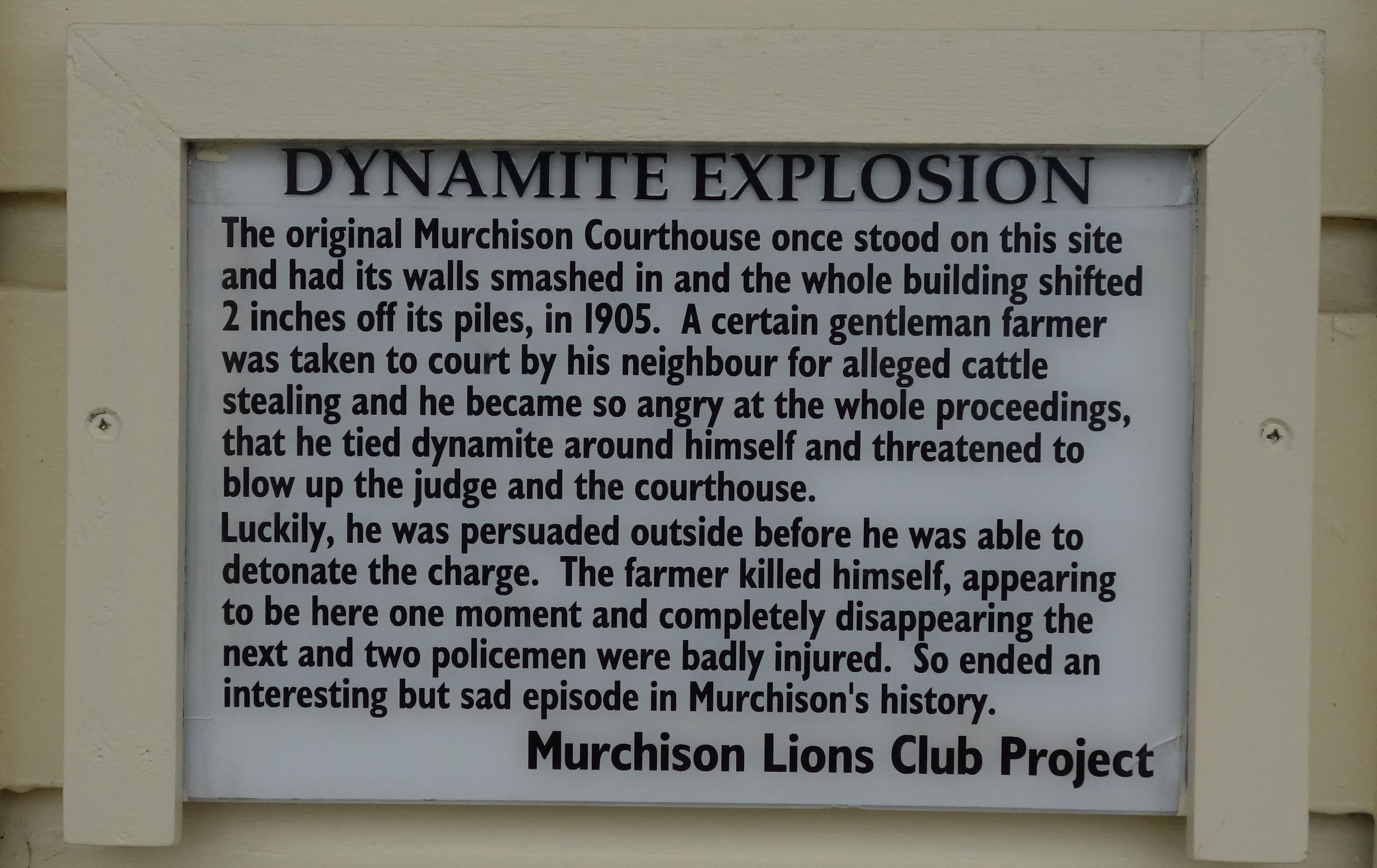
Commemorative plaque for the 1905 Murchison suicide attack

The earliest known non-military suicide attack occurred in Murchison, New Zealand, on 14 July 1905. When a long-standing dispute between two farmers resulted in a court case, defendant Joseph Sewell arrived with sticks of gelignite strapped to his body. During the court proceedings, Sewell shouted "I'll blow the devil to hell, and I have enough dynamite to do just that." He was then ushered out of the building and when a police officer tried to arrest him on the street, Sewell detonated the charge, killing himself. No one other than Sewell was killed by the attack.

==== 1927 Bath School bombings in Michigan, USA ====
The first reported car bombing was the Bath School bombings in Michigan, USA in 1927. Multiple separate explosions on the same day killed 45 people, including the bomber, and half of a school was destroyed. The bombings were all carried out by Andrew Kehoe, motivated by a personal grievance. His death was possibly an intentional suicide, but the cause of the explosion was a gun shot that might not have been intended to set off the load. The explosion itself did not seem to form part of a suicide attack on a specific planned target other than possibly himself and his truck. The explosives in his truck detonated when he saw two men nearby had a gun, after he set off multiple other bombs. The explosion may have been set off indirectly by him firing his own gun at the men. Most of the deaths were caused by the earlier bombs.

=== Pahartali European Club attack (1932, in Bangladesh) ===
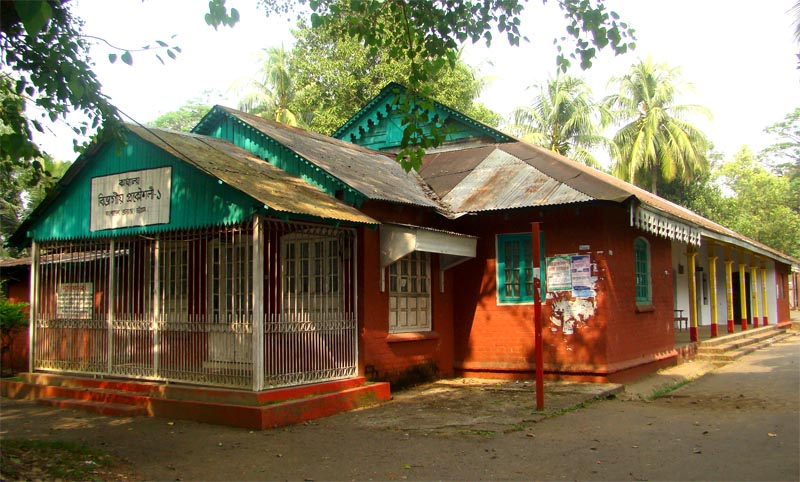
The Pahartali European Club (shown here in 2010) was torched by the group of revolutionaries.

In 1932, Surya Sen planned an attack on the Pahartali European Club which had a signboard that read "Dogs and Indians not allowed". Sen decided to appoint a woman leader for the mission. As Kalpana Datta was arrested prior to the planned attack, Pritilata was assigned the leadership of the group. Pritilata went to Kotowali sea side for arms training and the plan of their attack was finalised there. It was decided to attack the club on 24 September 1932, and the members of the group were given potassium cyanide, to be swallowed to commit suicide if they were caught. Pritilata herself committed suicide on this attack after sustaining bullet injury. According to the police report, one woman was killed, and four men and seven women were injured in the attack.

=== Spanish civil war (1936–1939) ===
There are a few reports of suicide bombers during the civil war in the 1930s.

=== Chinese suicide squads ===
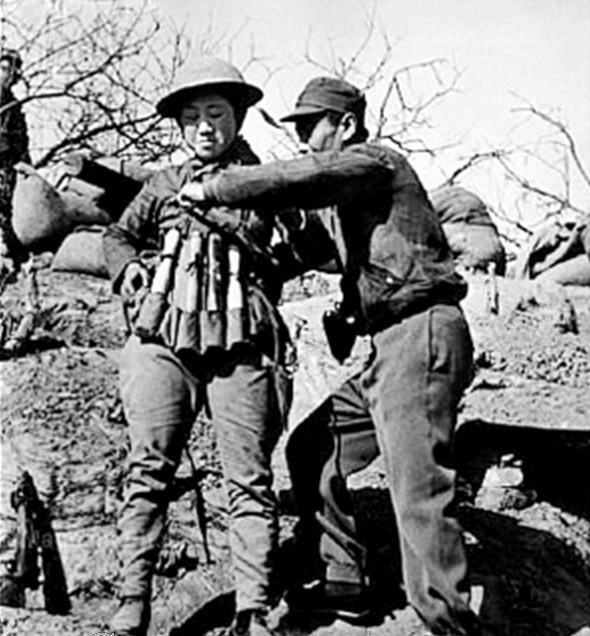
Chinese suicide bomber putting on a 24 hand grenade-explosive vest prior to attack on Japanese tanks at the Battle of Taierzhuang.

During the Xinhai Revolution and the Warlord Era of the Republic of China, "Dare to Die Corps" (traditional Chinese: 敢死隊; simplified Chinese: 敢死队; pinyin: gǎnsǐduì; Wade–Giles: Kan-ssu-tui) or "suicide squads". were frequently used by Chinese armies. China deployed these suicide units against the Japanese during the Second Sino-Japanese War.

In 1938 300 Chinese troops reportedly killed themselves with hand grenades to avoid being captured. Hand grenade suicide to avoid capture has also been used by other militaries (see above), and allegedly was recommended by the leader of the Golani Brigade of the IDF.

In the Xinhai Revolution, many Chinese revolutionaries became martyrs in battle. "Dare to Die" student corps were founded for student revolutionaries wanting to fight against Qing dynasty rule. Sun Yat-sen and Huang Xing promoted the corp, Huang saying, "We must die, so let us die bravely." Suicide squads were formed by Chinese students going into battle, knowing that they would be killed fighting against overwhelming odds.

The 72 Martyrs of Huanghuagang died in the uprising that began the Wuchang Uprising. They were recognized as heroes and martyrs by the Kuomintang party and the Republic of China. The martyrs in the "Dare to Die" corps wrote letters to family members before heading off to certain death. The Huanghuakang was built as a monument to the 72 dead. The deaths of the revolutionaries helped the establishment of the Republic of China, overthrowing the Qing dynasty. Other "Dare to Die" student corps in the Xinhai revolution were led by students who later became major military leaders in Republic of China, like Chiang Kai-shek and Huang Shaoxiong with the Muslim Bai Chongxi against Qing dynasty forces. Dare to Die troops were used by warlords. The Kuomintang used one to put down an insurrection in Canton. Many women joined them in addition to men to achieve martyrdom against China's opponents. They were known as 烈士 (lit-she; martyrs) after accomplishing their mission.

During the January 28 Incident or Shanghai Incident (28 January – 3 March 1932), a Dare to Die squad from the 19th Route Army attacked Japanese positions during the escalating rioting and violence in the city.

Suicide bombing was also used against the Japanese. The Dare to Die Corps was effectively used against Japanese units at the Battle of Taierzhuang. They used swords and wore suicide vests made out of grenades.

One Chinese soldier detonated a grenade vest, killing 20 Japanese soldiers in the defense of Sihang Warehouse. Chinese troops strapped explosives such as grenade packs or dynamite to their bodies and threw themselves under Japanese tanks to destroy them. This tactic was used during the Battle of Shanghai to stop a Japanese tank column when an attacker exploded himself beneath the lead tank, and at the Battle of Taierzhuang where Chinese troops with dynamite and grenades strapped to themselves rushed the Japanese tanks in one incident obliterating four Japanese tanks with grenade bundles.

During the 1946–1950 Communist Revolution, coolies, poor laborers, fighting the Communists formed Dare to Die Corps. During the 1989 Tiananmen Square protests and massacre, protesting students also formed "Dare to Die Corps" risking their lives defending the leaders of the protest.

== During World War II ==
=== Germans during World War II ===
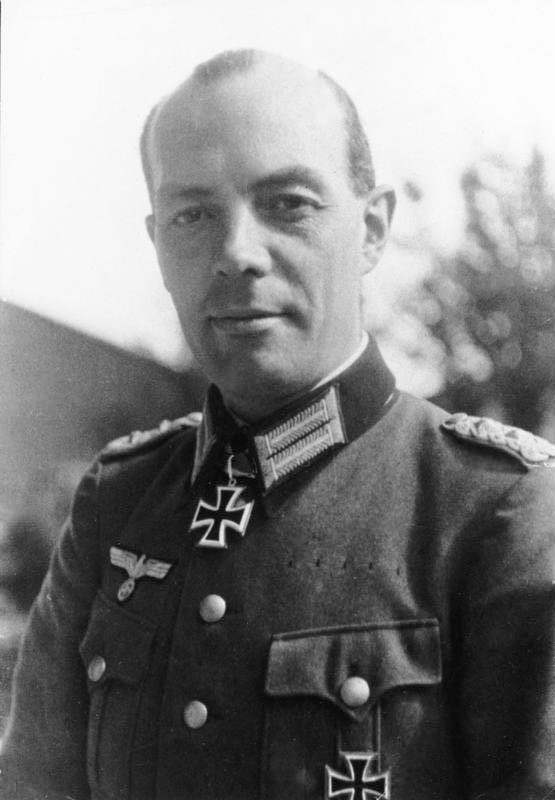
Rudolf Christoph Freiherr von Gersdorff

Rudolf Christoph Freiherr von Gersdorff intended to assassinate Adolf Hitler with a suicide bombing in 1943, but was unable to complete the attack.

According to the commander of the 12th SS Panzer Division Kurt Meyer, several of his men had tied explosives to themselves and jumped on Allied tanks during the Normandy Campaign.

During the Battle of Berlin the Luftwaffe flew "self-sacrifice missions" (German: selbstopfereinsätze) against Soviet bridges over the River Oder. These "total missions" were flown by pilots of the Leonidas Squadron. From 17 to 20 April 1945, using any available aircraft, the Luftwaffe claimed the squadron had destroyed 17 bridges. However, military historian Antony Beevor believes this claim was exaggerated and only the railway bridge at Küstrin was definitely destroyed. He comments that "thirty-five pilots and aircraft was a high price to pay for such a limited and temporary success". The missions were called off when the Soviet ground forces reached the vicinity of the squadron's airbase at Jüterbog.

The Luftwaffe also formed the Sonderkommando Elbe squadron late in the war, flying Bf 109 in ramming attacks on Allied bombers. In their lone mission on 7 April 1945, a force of 180 Bf 109s managed to ram 15 Allied bombers, downing 8 of them.Though widely described as suicide missions, the pilots were expected to parachute out just before or after the ramming attack.

=== Destruction of Auschwitz crematorium IV (1944) ===
The Sonderkommando revolt at Auschwitz on 7 October 1944 is widely described as a suicide mission.

Most (452) of the rebel prisoners were killed by the SS guards during or soon after the uprising. Rebels armed with work tools and shivs attacked SS guards who were armed with pistols and machine guns.

Some of the Sonderkommando prisoners took the already suicidal mission a step further. They set fire to Crematorium IV while they were inside the building, and stayed inside to prevent the guards putting out the fire until the building was destroyed. The fire possibly also ignited explosives they had placed in the walls.

The Polish resistance outside the camp tried to postpone the uprising until the Red Army were close enough to assist, originally it was planned to coordinate with Operation Bagration, but was delayed. Some worried that people who did not participate would face collective punishment for the revolt. The Sonderkommando prisoners, who had been forced to work in the crematorium, were unwilling to wait; they worried they would be killed before the Red Army approached to liberate the concentration camp, which eventually happened in 1945.

=== Allied forces during WWII ===
In 1941, some newspapers reported that, "While two New Zealand officers stood on a bridge in Greece holding up advancing Germans with their revolvers, a New Zealand sergeant placed two bared wires together and blew the bridge, the officers, and himself to smithereens".

=== Attacks by the Empire of Japan ===
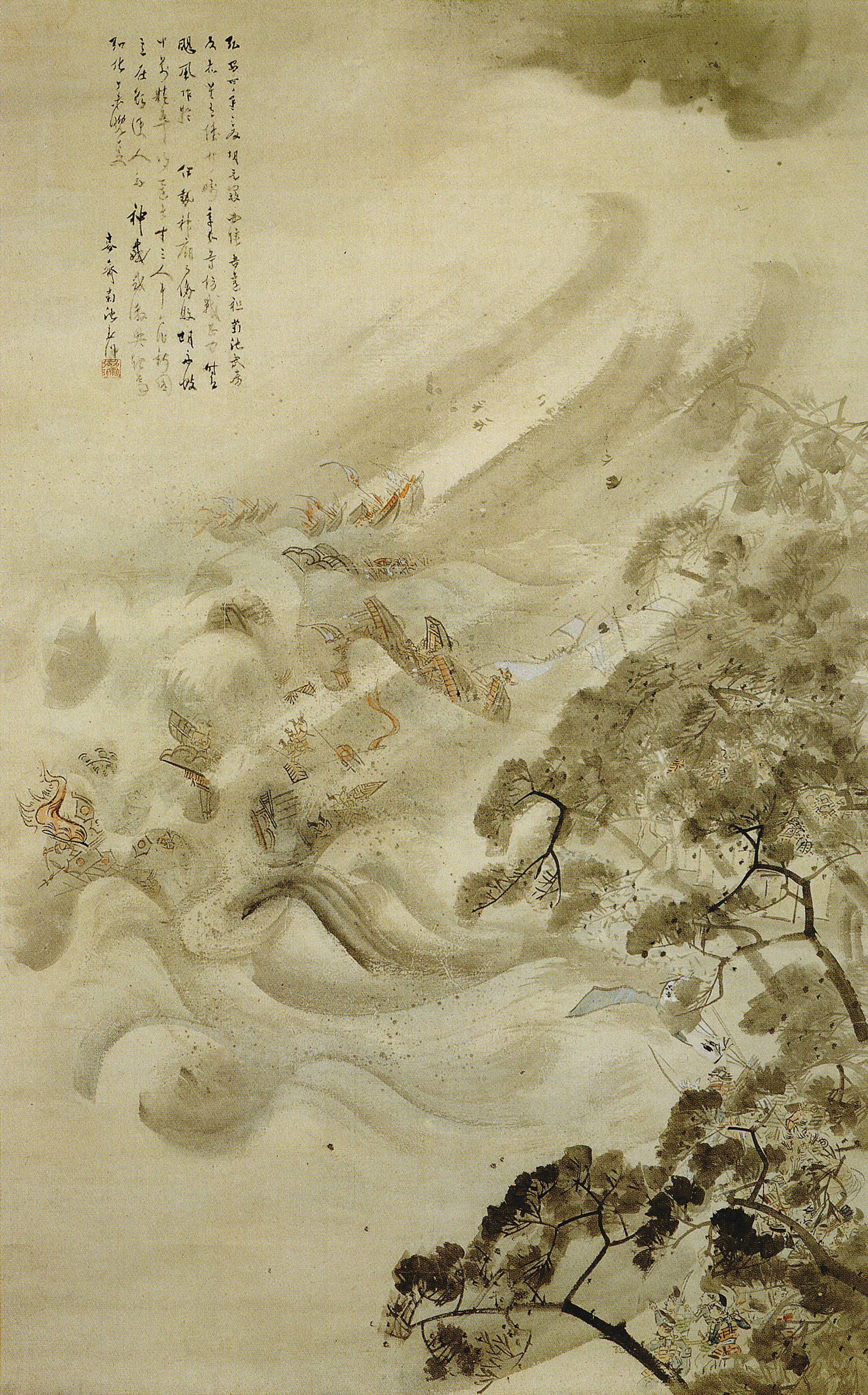
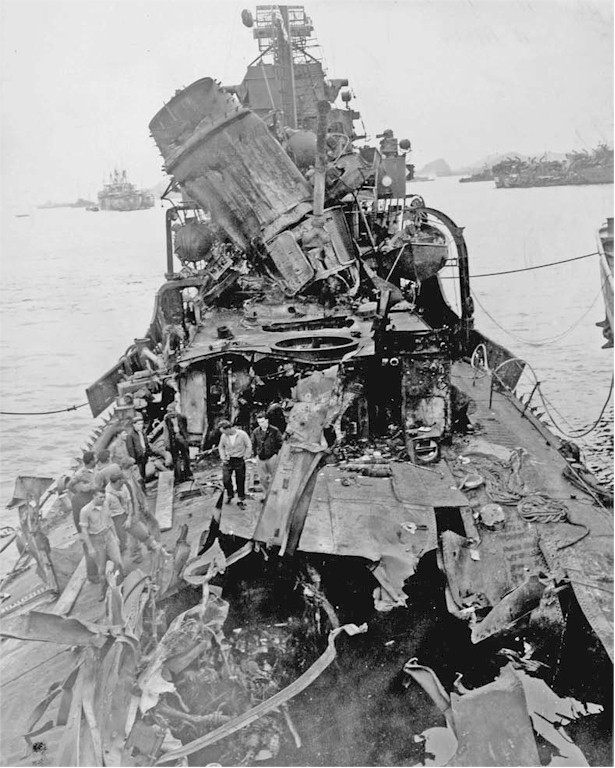
Left: Kamikaze was a reference to two typhoons that sank or dispersed Kublai Khan's invading fleets. Right: Kamikaze damage to the destroyer USS Newcomb.

The most overt and prolific use of suicide attacks during World War II was by Empire of Japan. It remains the most intense and deadly, campaign of suicide attacks in history. Kamikaze pilots on suicide missions flew aircraft full of bombs and improvised missiles at enemy targets. The attacks used 2600 aircraft to kill 7000 allied naval personnel and 4000 Japanese suicide operatives.

Kamikaze was a ritual act of self-sacrifice carried out by Japanese pilots of explosive-laden aircraft against Allied warships which occurred on a large scale at the end of World War II. About 3000 attacks were made and about 50 ships were sunk.

Later in the war, as Japan became more desperate, this act became formalised and ritualised. Planes were outfitted with explosives specific to the task of a suicide mission. Kamikaze strikes were a weapon of asymmetric war used by the Empire of Japan against United States Navy and Royal Navy aircraft carriers, although the armoured flight deck of the Royal Navy carriers diminished kamikaze effectiveness. Along with fitting existing aircraft with bombs, the Japanese also developed the Ohka, a purpose-built suicide aircraft that was air-launched from a carrying bomber and propelled to the target at high speed using rocket engines. The Japanese Navy also used piloted torpedoes called kaiten (heaven shaker) on suicide missions. Although sometimes called midget submarines, these were modified versions of the unmanned torpedoes of the time and are distinct from the torpedo-firing midget submarines used earlier in the war, which were designed to infiltrate shore defenses and return to a mother ship after firing their torpedoes. Although extremely hazardous, these midget submarine attacks were not technically suicide missions, as the earlier midget submarines had escape hatches. Kaitens, however, provided no means of escape.

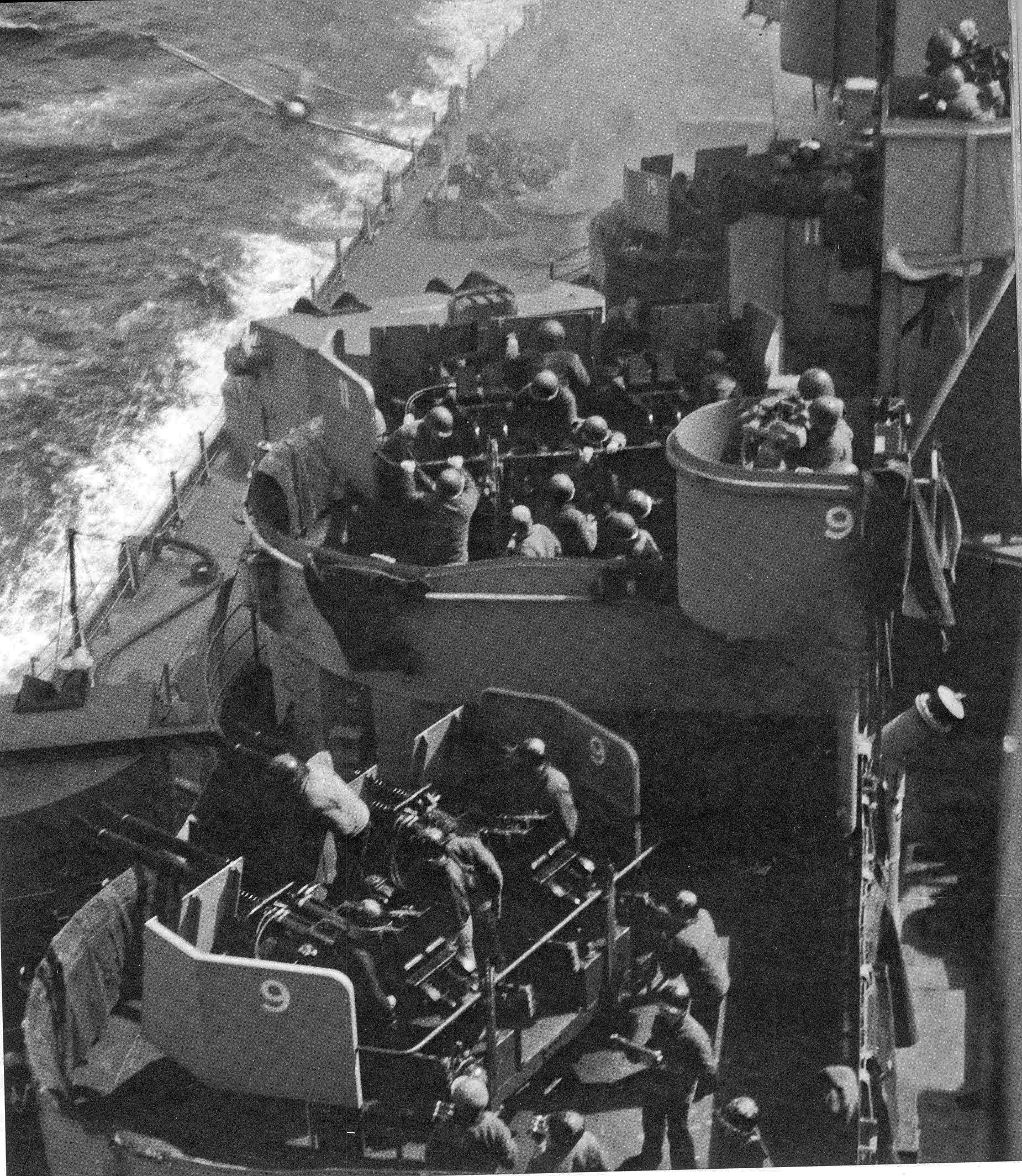
A6M Zero attack on USS Missouri (BB-63), 11 April 1945

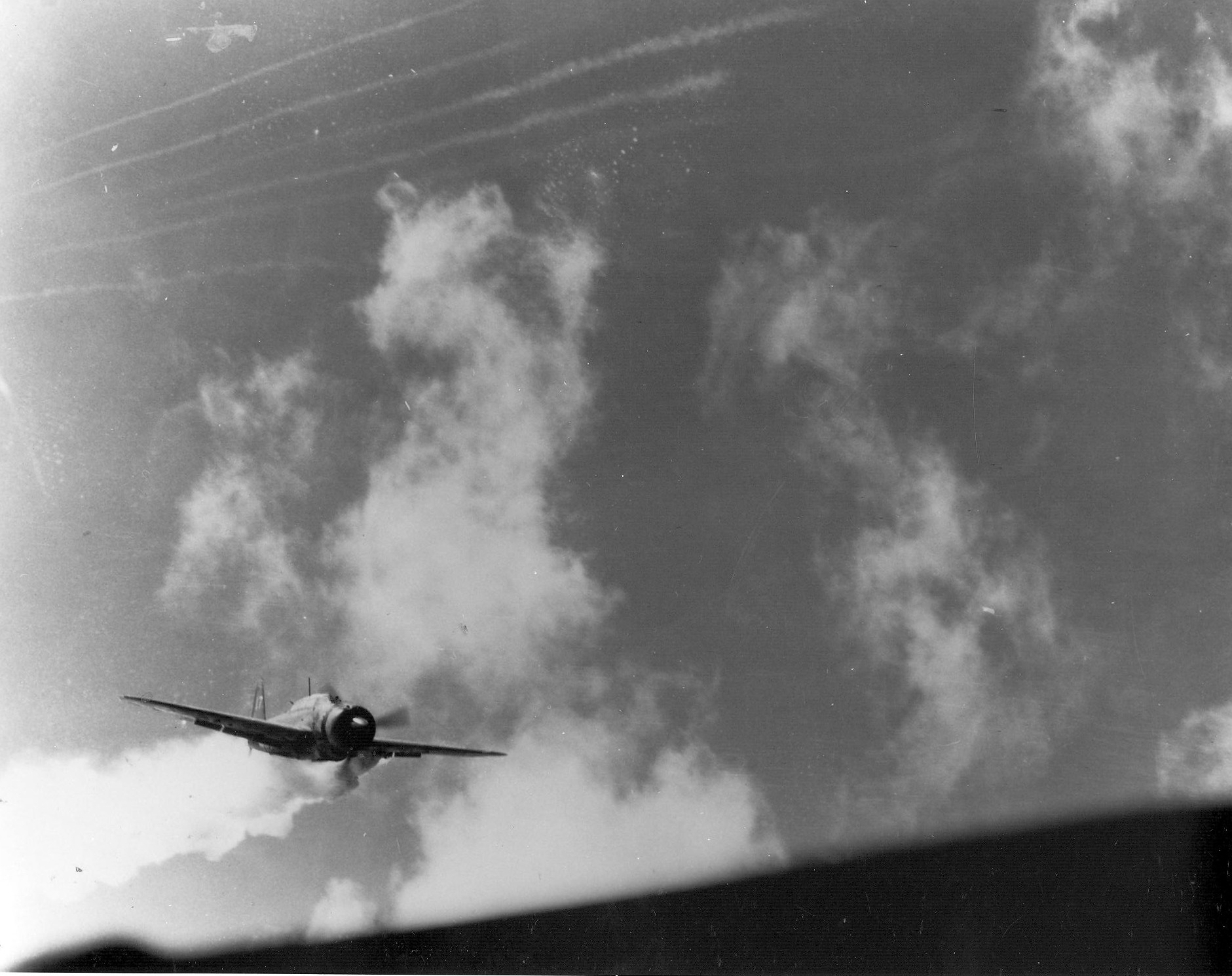
Special attack pilot Lieutenant Yoshinori Yamaguchi's Yokosuka D4Y diving at the carrier USS Essex, 25 November 1944.

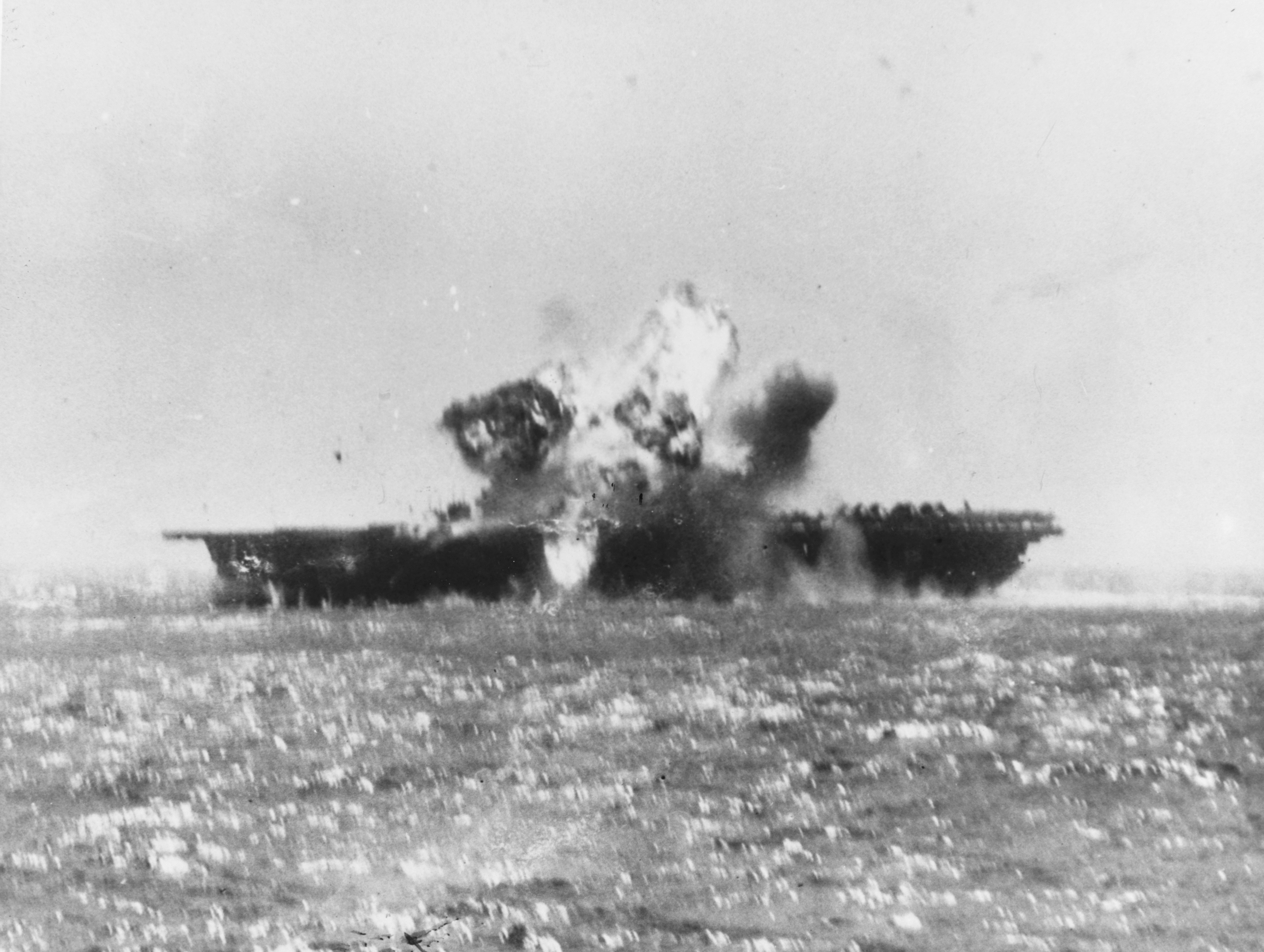
A kamikaze aircraft explodes after crashing into Essex on 25 November 1944

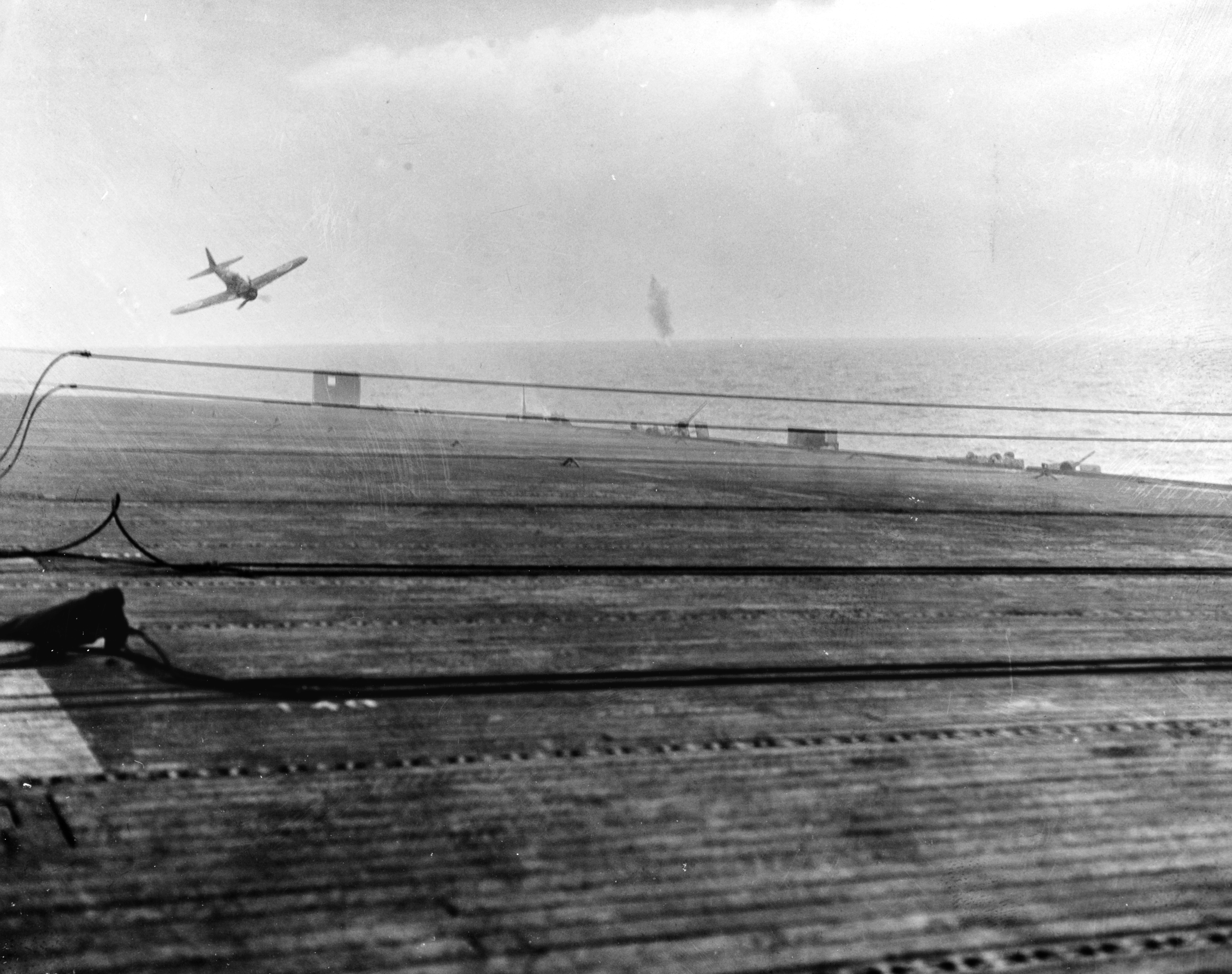
Tokkotai unit Kamikaze crash diving, about to miss escort carrier USS White Plains (CVE‑66), 25 October 1944

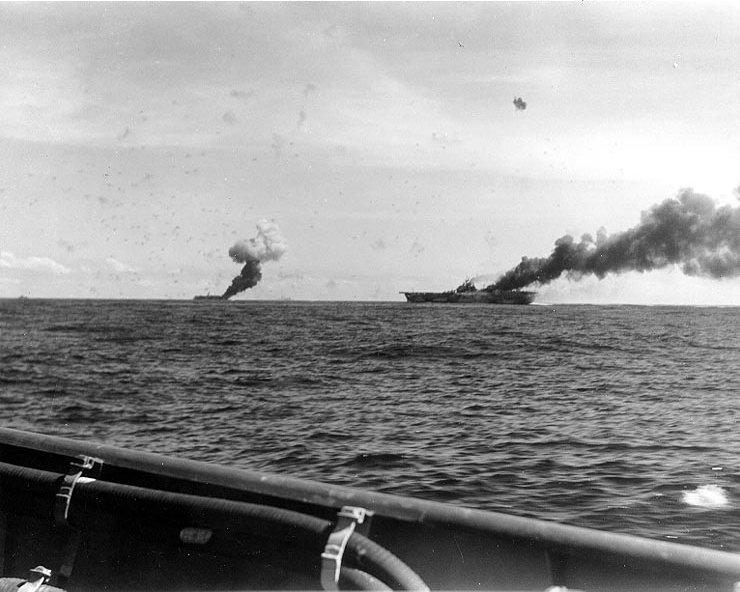
Belleau Wood (left) and Franklin hit by kamikazes, 30 October 1944

== Pilot suicides after WWII ==
Some passenger airline pilots appear to have committed mass murder–suicide, or attempted to, with no apparent political motives.

=== Examples of undisputed pilot suicides and attempted suicides ===
- Japan Air Lines Flight 350 – 1982 deliberate crash in Tokyo, Japan.
- Germanwings Flight 9525 – Suicidal co-pilot locked the captain out of the cockpit and deliberately crashed the aircraft into the French Alps, killing 150.

=== Examples of speculated and disputed pilot suicides ===
- SilkAir Flight 185 – 1997 aircraft crash in Indonesia
- EgyptAir Flight 990 – 1999 aircraft crash in the Atlantic Ocean
- Malaysia Airlines Flight 370 (8 March 2014) – Pilot suicide is one of several competing explanations suggested for the disappearance of Malaysia Airlines Flight 370.

== During the Cold War ==
=== Reduced suicide attacks after WWII ===
After the Surrender of Japan, at the end of World War II in Asia, there was a massive reduction in the number of suicide attacks. The few that did occur were sometimes carried out by individuals for personal reasons such as pilot suicides in commercial aircraft (see above). For most of the Cold War suicide attacks were only sporadic, but suicide attacks began to become more frequent towards the end of the Cold War (see below).

=== Insurgency in Palestine (1944–1948) ===
In the 1930s, Zionist insurgents in Palestine used proxy bombing and animal-borne bomb attacks in their attacks on civilian targets such as Haifa vegetable market. By the 1940s they explored the possibility of using humans on their own side, resulting in at least two deaths. The Lehi militant group used Judges 16:30 in discussions about potential suicide attacks. In a meeting about ways to assassinate General Evelyn Barker, the British Army commander in Mandatory Palestine, a young woman volunteered to do the assassination as a suicide bombing. They referred to it as a "Let my soul die with the Philistines" proposal (Hebrew: תמות נפשי עם פלשתים), or a "Samson option". On that occasion other members of the group allegedly rejected her offer. (Note: She also had a physical disability that might have made her unable to carry out the plan the group had in mind. The Lehi memorialize her among their martyrs and fallen combatants (Hebrew: הללי לח"י), but her cause of death is not described.) However, the Lehi collaborated with the Irgun militant group on at least one joint suicide bombing carried out by one militant from each group during the insurgency against the British (before the 1948 Palestine war). The plan, named Operation Samson (Hebrew: מבצע שמשון, romanized: Mivtsa Shimshon), was intended to be a suicide attack, but the two militants were the only casualties. A Lehi militant and an Irgun militant blew themselves up in Jerusalem Central Prison. They used improvised grenades that had been constructed by another Lehi prisoner. The explosives were disguised as oranges to hide them from the guards, and smuggled in with the prisoners' food. The plan was to use the grenades as they were taken to the gallows to kill themselves, the executioners, and British officials who attended hangings. But the explosives detonated early, while the two of them were alone together in their cell. Allegedly when the pair learned that Rabbi Goldman would be present at their hanging, they changed the plan and committed suicide alone together before they were scheduled to be taken to the gallows. (Note: Including by the Irgun leader at the time, and his political successor in 2010.) The Lehi militant who built the IEDs, later had a leadership role in the Israeli military's nuclear, chemical, and biological weapons division (Hebrew: אב״כ). (Note: sources.) (Note: The Hebrew acronym אב״כ Aleph Betַ Kaph can also be written אב״ך with the terminal form of the latter Kaph, and the Gershayim is usually substituted for a double apostrophe or double quote mark.) (Note: He originally enlisted using his girlfriend's surname. Some of his work was purely defensive, such as the development of gas masks, but even that was conducted in great secrecy.) The story of their deaths has featured in multiple speeches by Likud leaders. (Note: Likud party leaders: Menachem Begin; Ehud Olmert; Benjamin Netanyahu) In 2007, The Jerusalem Post described the double suicide as "One of the best-known stories of heroism leading to the creation of the State of Israel".

The prison is now the Museum of Underground Prisoners (Note: Media related to Interior of the museum of the Underground Prisoners at Wikimedia Commons Media related to Gallows at the museum of the Underground Prisoners at Wikimedia Commons)
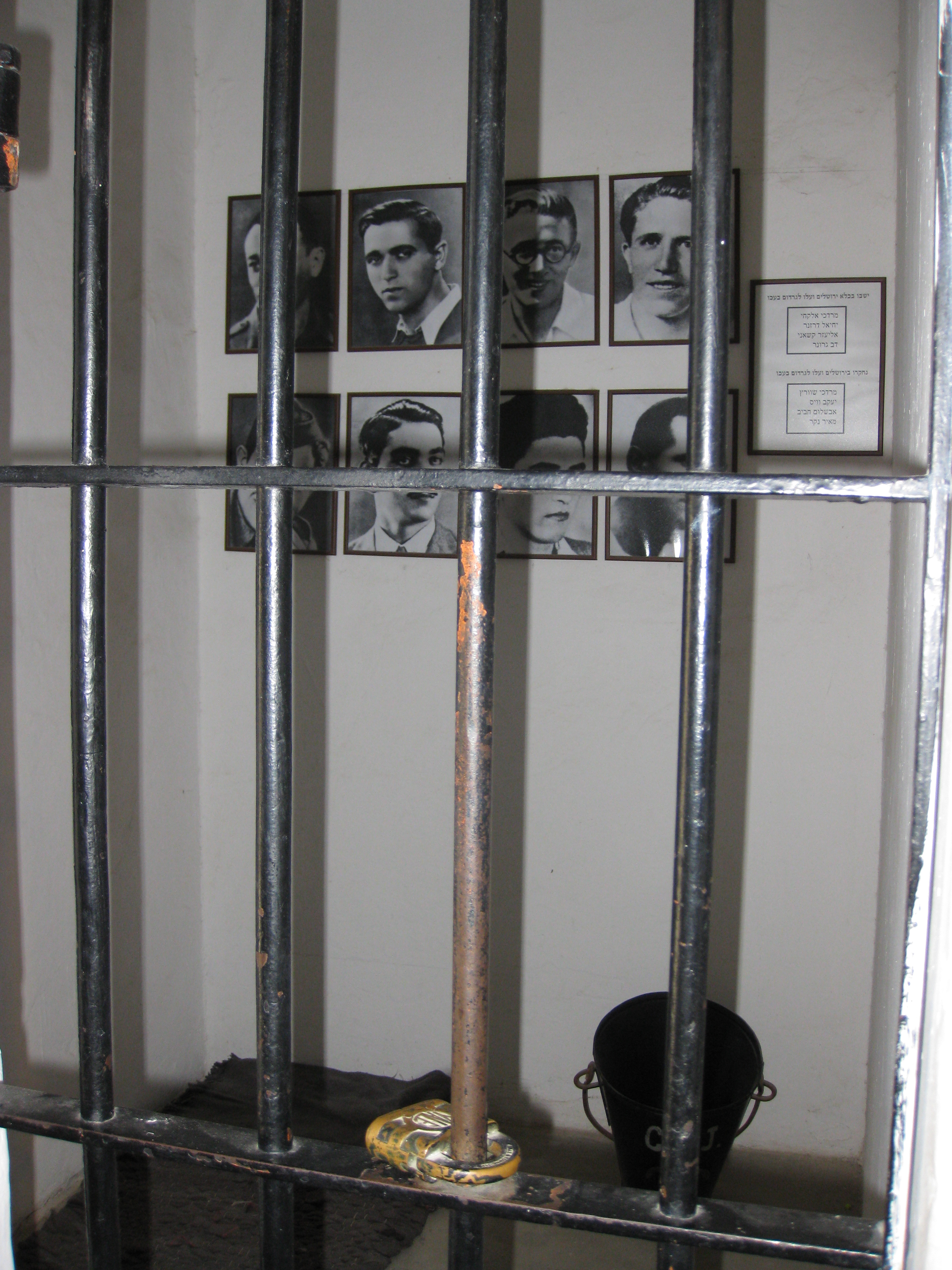
Eight militants were hanged. (Note: According to The Revolt, the plan was originally devised for Dov Gruner, top left. But before it could be carried out, he was relocated to Acre Prison, where he was executed alongside the other three on the top row.)

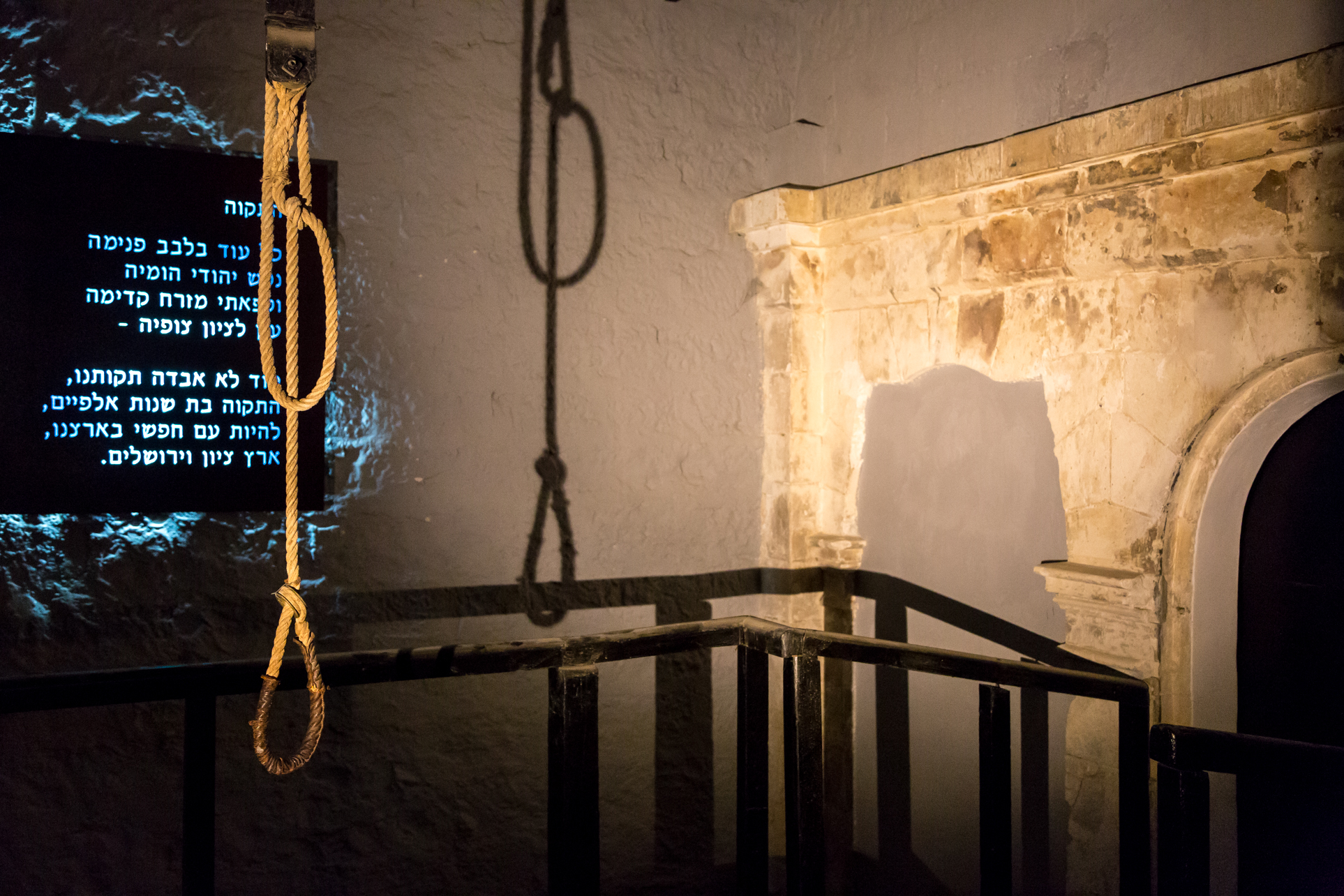
The intended location of the suicide attack was the gallows. (Note: The militant groups hoped to kill the warden and other officials who usually attended hangings. However, both IEDs donated earlier than planned, killing only the militants, most sources say this was a last moment change of plan when Rabbi Jacob Goldman insisted on attending the hanging)

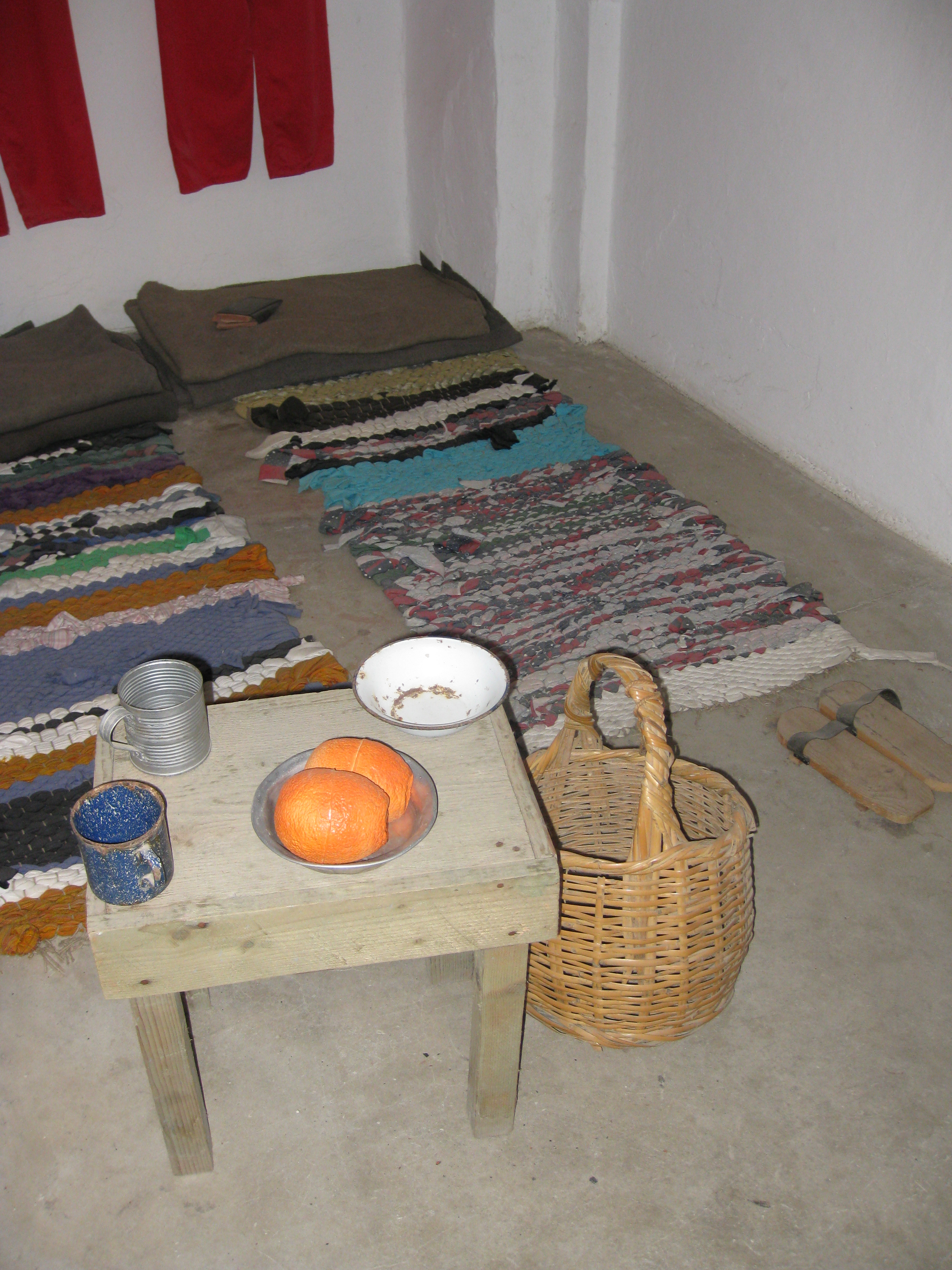
Death row cell with oranges. (Note: representing the two "orange grenades")

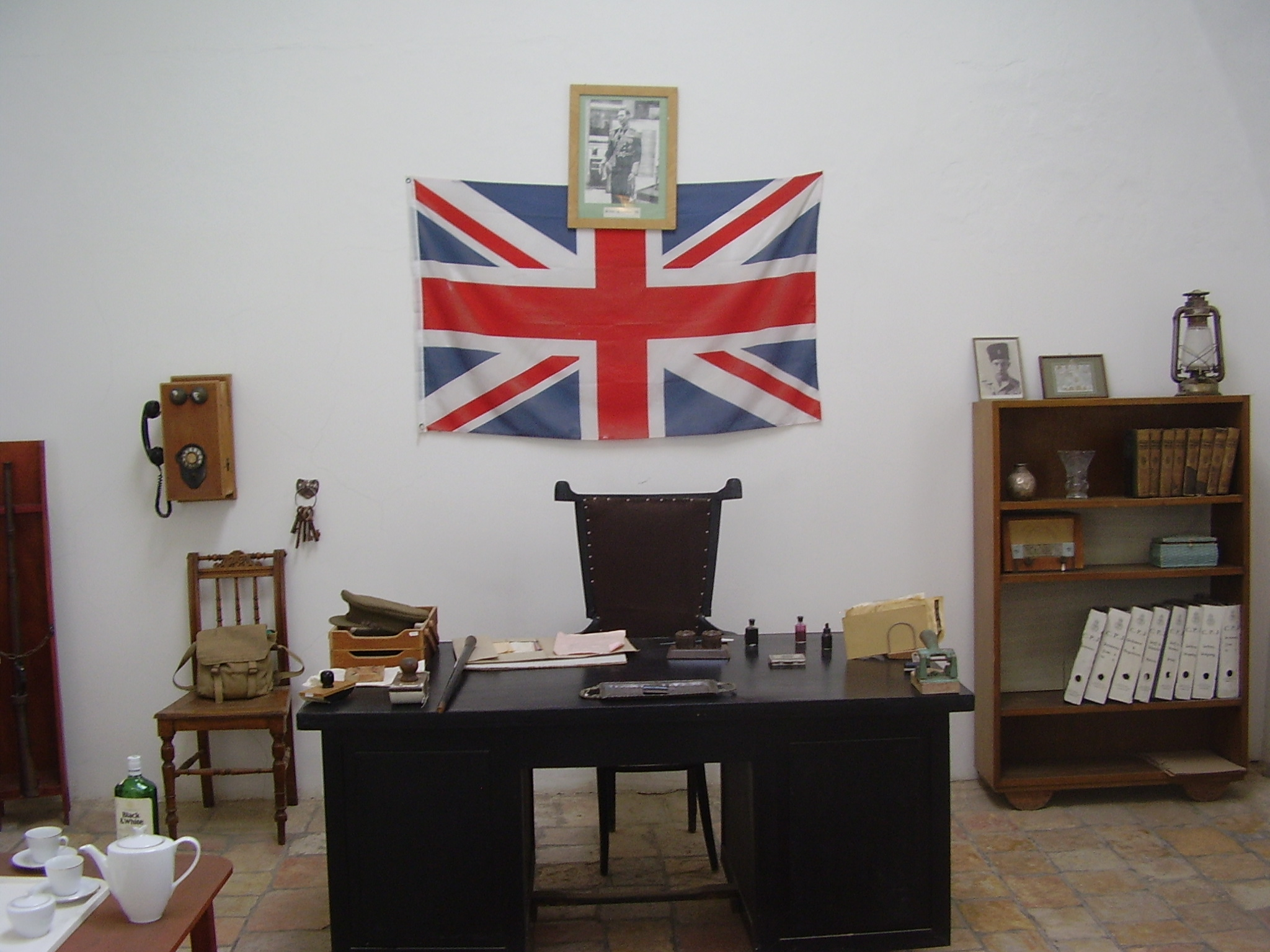
Office of the warden, one of the intended victims.

=== Korean War (1950–1953) ===
North Korean tanks were attacked by South Koreans with suicide tactics during the Korean War.

American tanks in Seoul were attacked by North Korean suicide squads, who used satchel charges. North Korean soldier Li Su-Bok is considered a hero for destroying an American tank with a suicide bomb.

In 1952, three Chinese soldiers reportedly killed themselves with hand grenades to avoid capture.

=== 1953 in West Virginia ===
In January 1953 at a magistrate's Court in West Virginia, 47-year-old Donzel McCray "turned himself into a human bomb" with sticks of dynamite strapped to his waist. (Note: also reported as "Don" or "McGray".) He killed himself and injured his ex-wife and her lawyer. The couple had six children and had divorced the previous September.

=== Israeli and Egyptian wars (1956–1970) ===
==== Early suicide tactics in Gaza ====
Some Israelis romanticize acts of self sacrifice in battle by analogy to the Biblical hero Samson, particularly if they take place in Gaza, where Israelis believe he committed suicide and killed thousands of enemy Philistines in the process. In situations where death or severe injury is already difficult to avoid, it is seen as heroic to abandon efforts to save one's self and instead focus on causing as much harm as possible to the enemy, in the process of effectively committing suicide. This includes some anecdotes of events during their wars with Egypt.

==== Suez Crisis (1956) ====
According to Egyptian media, during the Suez Crisis in 1956, an Arab Christian military officer from Syria, Jules Jammal, sunk a French ship with a suicide attack. However, none of the French ships named by the sources were harmed during the crisis. It is unclear which actual ship he is supposed to have sunk. One source calls the ship at issue the "liner Jean D'Arc" and another the "French warship, Jeanne D'Arc". There was a French cruiser Jeanne d'Arc in service at that time, but it was decommissioned in 1964 rather than sunk. Some sources name the battleship Jean Bart.

==== "War of Attrition" (1967–1970) ====
On 21 March 1968, in response to persistent Palestine Liberation Organization (PLO) raids against Israelis, Israel attacked the town of Karameh, Jordan, the site of a major PLO camp. The goal of the invasion was to destroy the Karameh refugee camp and capture Yasser Arafat in reprisal for the attacks by the PLO against Israelis. The PLO attacks had culminated in an Israeli school bus hitting a mine in the Negev. According to a biography of an autobiography by Tass Saada – an alleged former PLO sniper who converted to Christianity in the United States – this battle marked the first known deployment of suicide bombers by Palestinian (Arab) forces. Modern academics describe aspects of the way the Battle of Karameh is remembered as a "myth" or "distortion".

=== Lod airport massacre (1972) ===
One of the first incidents to be labelled "suicide terrorism" was the mass shooting at the airport in Lod, Israel's international airport. (Note: Now known as Ben Gurion Airport, re-named after David Ben-Gurion.) Two of the attackers died during the attack, one of whom deliberately committed suicide using a hand grenade. According to France 24 and AFP, "The massacre was planned as a suicide attack and all three Japanese militants had intended to mutilate their faces with their grenades to make identification more difficult".

It was carried out by three foreign fighters from the Japanese Red Army (a communist militant group from Japan) in corroboration with the Popular Front for the Liberation of Palestine – External Operations (PFLP-EO) division, led by Wadie Haddad, a rebellious offshoot of the PFLP. Some reports at the time labelled the incident a "Kamikaze" attack, but others have criticized the label, including the surviving attacker's interpreter. The Kamikaze were a unit of suicide bombers in the airforce of imperial Japan in WWII, the Empire of Japan had a very different ideology to the JRA. Researchers from Duke University described the JRA's motives as "rooted in anti-imperialism, anti-colonialism, and anti-capitalism". In 2010, Ze'ev Sarig, the former manager of Lod Airport, compared the attack to the September 11 attacks in New York, "This attack was for Israelis what the September 11th attacks were for Americans", when trying to sue North Korea for the attack in a United States court in Puerto Rico in 2010.

=== Cold War era literature and mythology ===
==== The Revolt (1951) ====
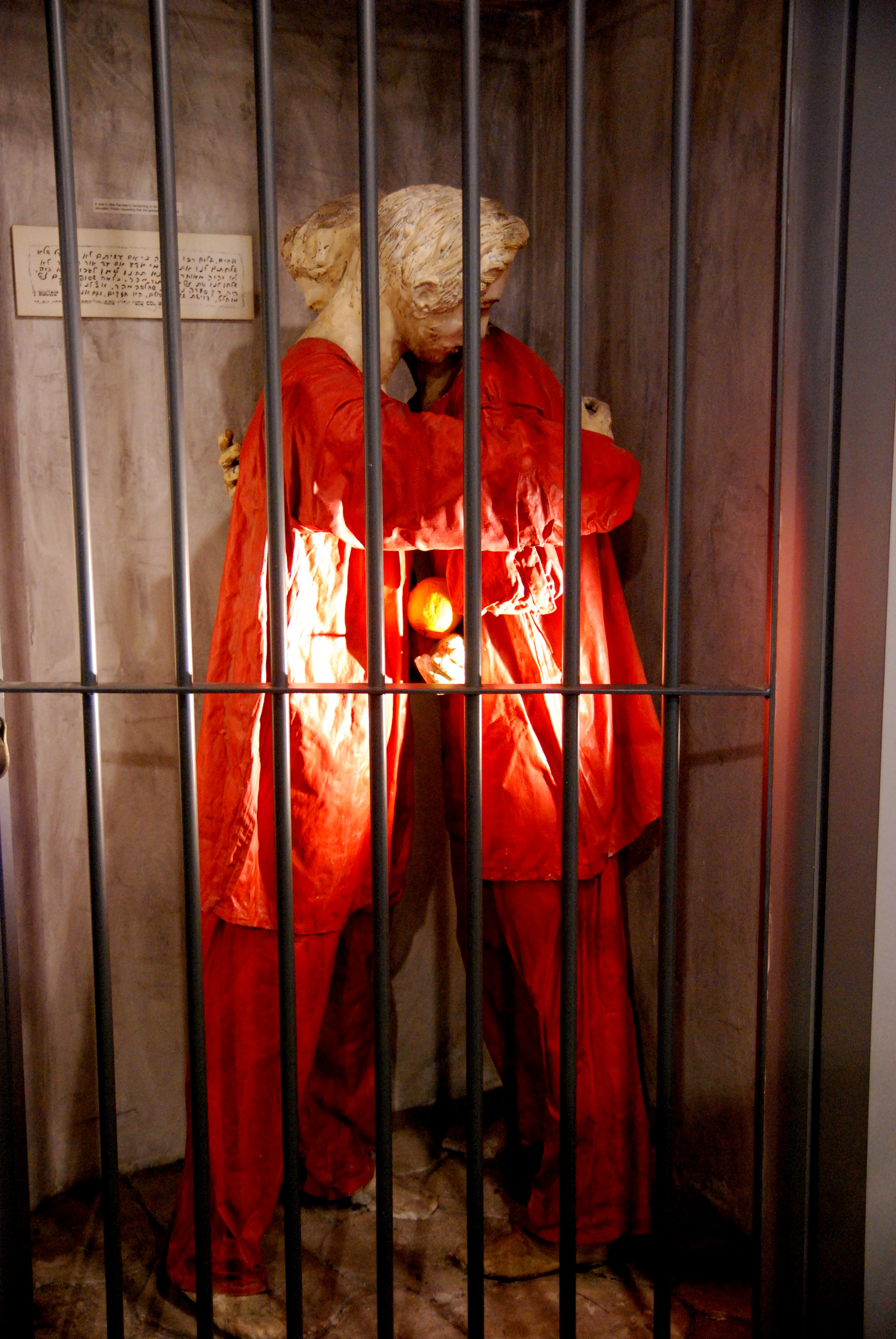
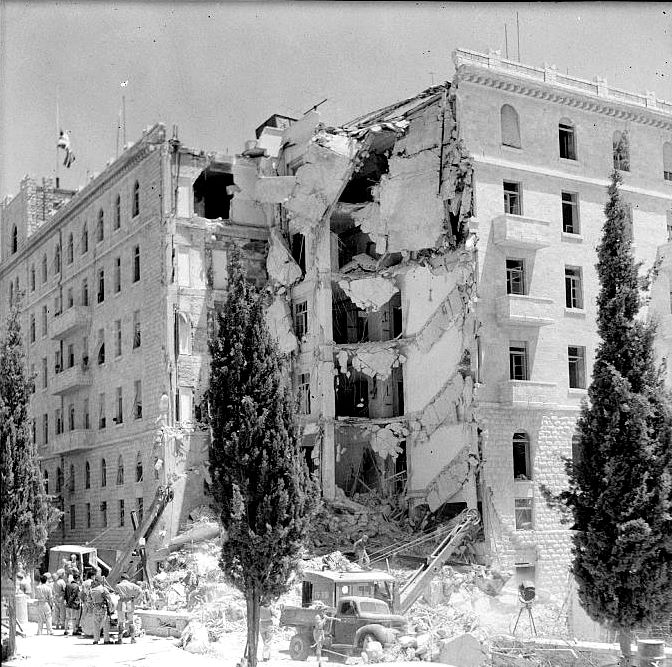
Left: Exhibit in the Lehi Museum depicting the prisoners in red uniforms. Right: The most famous Irgun attack, the 1946 King David Hotel bombing, was not a suicide attack as such. (Note: one bomber was killed, but he was shot.) However, many of the technical and propaganda techniques they used have now become ubiquitous in modern terrorism, including groups who have prolifically used suicide bombing.

The Revolt, written by Menachem Begin before he became Prime Minister, tells the story of the Lehi (referred to by their translated name's acronym, F.F.I. "Freedom Fighters of Israel" in early English editions) and Begin's own Irgun fighters during the Jewish insurgency in Palestine. The Revolt influenced groups from a wide variety of ideologies. Some of these groups were the groups began using suicide attacks in the 1990s. The book was allegedly found in Osama bin Laden's al-Qaeda organization. Begin praised his militants' willingness to die, "These two wonderful young men greeted the sentence with the singing of Hatikvah". The "two wonderful young men" we're the two who blew themselves up in 1947, he described their deaths, "even before they put on their red uniforms. They too held their heads high when they faced their judges… But they did not reach the gallows. They too sang on the threshold of death — a song of faith in God: 'Lord of the world who reigned before creation'. But their song ended with a great explosion which shattered the silence of the prison in occupied Jerusalem". (Note: "Lord of the world who reigned before creation" is a translation of Adon Olam.) In 1977 the author became prime minister, after previously being in opposition. Historical militants featured prominently in his political speeches. He praised the actions of his militants during the insurgency in Palestine in the 1940s, including the leader of the cell who bombed the King David Hotel (killing 91 people and 1 terrorist). His favourites were, again, the two young militants who blew themselves up in Jerusalem prison in 1947.

==== The Turner Diaries (1978) ====
The Turner Diaries is a work of fiction, but is confirmed to have inspired terrorist attacks and far right extremist movements. In the final scene before the epilogue, the main character carries out a suicide attack on The Pentagon, in an aircraft carrying a nuclear bomb. However, that specific scene is rarely linked to any specific attacks.

==== Preceding Cold War armed conflicts ====
Sunni Muslims were possibly the last major branch of the Abrahamic religions to resort to overt suicide attacks. Islamic suicide bombing is a fairly recent phenomenon. It was absent from the 1979–1989 Afghan jihad against the Soviet Union, an asymmetrical war where the mujahideen fought Soviet warplanes, helicopters and tanks primarily with light weapons. According to author Sadakat Kadri, "the very idea that Muslims might blow themselves up for God was unheard of before 1983, and it was not until the early 1990s that anyone anywhere had tried to justify killing innocent Muslims who were not on a battlefield". After 1983, the process was limited among Muslims to Hezbollah and other Lebanese Shia factions for more than a decade.

The early 1980s saw an increase in the use of terrorist tactics in the Middle East, by ideologically diverse groups. The book The Revolt, written by the former Irgun commander Menachem Begin before he became Prime Minister, influenced groups from a wide variety of ideologies, allegedly including Osama bin Laden's al-Qaeda organization. In Rise and Kill First Israeli journalist Ronen Bergman wrote that Hezbollah's 1983 campaign of coordinated terrorist attacks against United States, French, and Israeli military installations in Beirut drew inspiration from the Irgun's 1946 bombing campaign against the British created an atmosphere of fear which eventually forced the British to withdraw. Bergman further asserts that the influence of Israeli-sponsored terrorist operations on the emerging Islamists was also of operational nature: the Israeli proxy Front for the Liberation of Lebanon from Foreigners had carried out multiple deadly truck bombings in Lebanon long before the emergence of Hezbollah, a Mossad agent told Bergman: "I saw from a distance one of the cars blowing up and demolishing an entire street. We were teaching the Lebanese how effective a car bomb could be. Everything that we saw later with Hezbollah sprang from what they saw had happened after these operations".

=== Increased suicide attacks in the 1980s ===
==== Arabs began using suicide attacks in the 1980s ====
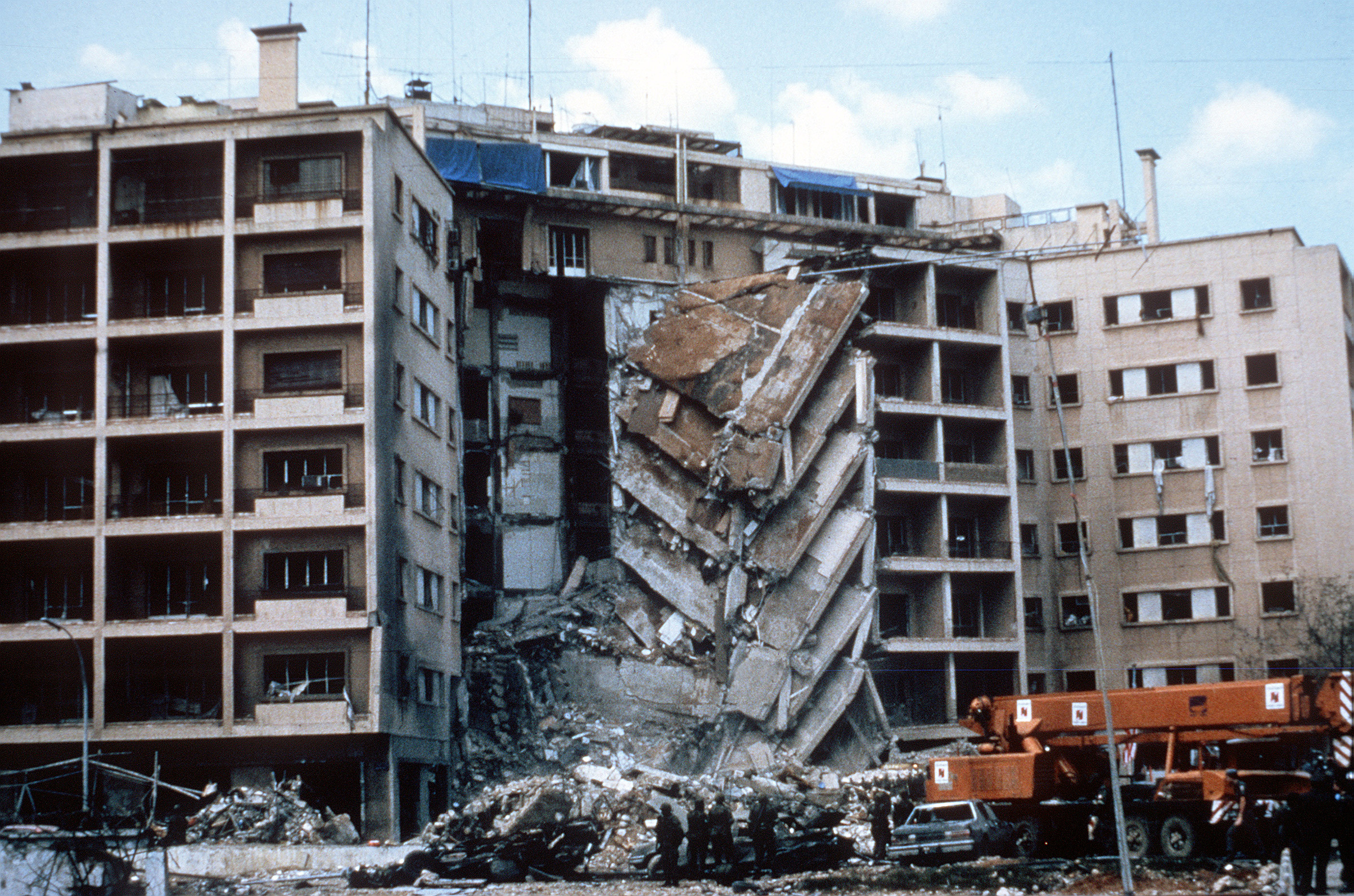
1983 suicide bombing of the U.S. embassy in Beirut.

The 1980s saw the first suicide attacks by Arabs, and by stricter definitions of suicide attack, the first suicide attacks in the Middle East. Earlier examples were the three Japanese foreign fighters in 1972, only one of whom killed himself as planned, the Ashkenazi and Kurdish-Iraqui duo who blew themselves up before reaching their target in 1947 (see above). As well as stories such as Jules Jammal whose suicide attacks probably happened only in myth. The Islamic Dawa Party's car bombing of the Iraqi embassy in Beirut in December 1981 and Hezbollah's bombing of the U.S. embassy in April 1983 and attack on United States Marines and French barracks in October 1983 brought suicide bombings international attention and began the modern suicide bombing era. Other parties to the civil war were quick to adopt the tactic, and by 1999 factions such as Hezbollah, the Amal Movement, the Ba'ath Party, and the Syrian Social Nationalist Party had carried out a total of roughly 50 suicide bombings. The Syrian Social Nationalist Party sent the first recorded female suicide bomber in 1985.

==== Hezbollah ====
One of the first bombing campaigns utilizing primarily suicide attacks had considerable political success. In the early 1980s, Hezbollah used these bombing attacks, targeting first foreign peacekeepers and then Israel. The result in both cases was the targets withdrawing from Lebanon.

=== Suicide bombings by individuals ===
Some of the first 1980s suicide bombings were by individuals, for both political and personal motives, for example:

==== 1981 Yangquan theatre bombing ====
The Yangquan theatre bombing was a suicide bombing that killed 32 people, in a cinema in Yangquan, Shanxi, China, on 22 July 1981. On 22 July 1981, 24-year-old Gao Haiping invited a girl, who had dumped him previously, to a film screening in Yangquan. (Note: The theatre was the San Kuang Club (三矿俱乐部), an institution run by the Bureau of Mining Affairs (矿务局).) He intended to kill them both with a bomb made of about 3 kg of ammonium nitrate and an electric detonator in a metal box. When the woman did not show up, Gao entered the theatre alone and took his place in seat 25 in the second row. At about 8 p.m., he put the bomb on his lap and detonated it, killing himself and 31 other people, wounding another 127, and severely damaging the theatre. Gao Haiping was an only child. He worked as a miner and was described as a loner who was pessimistic and dissatisfied with his life. A suicide note and letters to his parents were found in a drawer in his home, as well as explosives wrapped in paper.

==== Wanganui Computer Centre (1982) ====
Not all politically motivated suicide attacks targeted other people. On 18 November 1982, Neil Roberts carried out a suicide bombing in Whanganui, New Zealand. His target was a facility housing the main computer centre of the National Law Enforcement Database belonging to New Zealand Police, Courts, Ministry of Transport, and other law enforcement agencies, in Whanganui. The power of the explosion made it so that police were initially unable to determine the gender of the perpetrator. The attacker, 22-year-old Neil Roberts, a "punk rock" anarchist, was the only person killed, and the computer system was undamaged. He had written on a piece of cardboard before the explosion, "Heres [sic] one anarchist down. Hopefully there is a lot more waking up. One day we'll win – one day". A public toilet nearby had the slogan "We have maintained a silence closely resembling stupidity" painted on it, a slogan which the police believe Roberts had painted, and borrowed from the Revolutionary Proclamation of the Junta Tuitiva of 1809. The phrase is still closely linked with the bombing by the New Zealand public.

=== Sri Lankan civil war ===
During the Sri Lankan civil war, the Tamil Tigers (LTTE) adopted suicide bombing as a tactic, using bomb belts and female bombers. The LTTE carried out their first suicide attack in July 1987. (Note: Jane's Intelligence Review lists 168 Suicide bombings in Sri Lanka carried out by the LTTE between 187 and 2009.) Their Black Tiger unit committed 83 suicide attacks from 1987 to 2009, killing 981 people. Those killed included former Indian Prime Minister Rajiv Gandhi and the president of Sri Lanka, Ranasinghe Premadasa.

==== Liberation Tigers of Tamil Eelam (LTTE) 1987–2009 ====
The Liberation Tigers of Tamil Eelam were thought to have mastered the use of suicide attacks and had a separate unit, "The Black Tigers", consisting "exclusively of cadres who have volunteered to conduct suicide operations". The first prominent suicide bombing by the LTTE occurred in 1987 when Captain Miller drove a truck laden with explosives into a Sri Lankan army camp killing 40 soldiers.

Use of suicide by the LTTE had mixed results. The Liberation Tigers of Tamil Eelam (LTTE) pioneered the use of suicide bombings against civilian and political targets. In 2000, Yoram Schweitzer called the LTTE "unequivocally the most effective and brutal terrorist organization ever to utilize suicide terrorism". Their struggle for an independent state in the North and East of the island lasted for 26 years and led to the deaths of two heads of state or government, several ministers, and up to 100,000 combatants and civilians, from by a UN estimate. Politically, its attacks succeeded in halting the deployment of the Indian peace keeping troops to Sri Lanka and the subsequent postponement of the peace-talks in Sri Lanka. Nonetheless, the conflict ended in May 2009 not with an independent Eelam, but with the overrunning of LTTE strongholds and the killing of its leadership by the Sri Lankan military and security forces.

=== List of suicide attacks during the Cold War (1947–1991) ===
Country	Event (Note: Unless otherwise stated, at least one person intentionally and directly caused their own death during an action that was intended to cause other casualties or materially damage enemy assets.)	Weapon(s)	Deaths (Note: Total deaths, then: s = suicides (directly caused their own death); k = attackers killed by other people, including friendly fire; p = proxy bombers and other attackers under extreme duress; v = victims who were not involved in the attack)		Date	
Palestine (Jerusalem)	Two condemned militants blew themselves up in prison (see above)	Improvised hand grenades	2	2s 0v (Note: detonated early)	21 Apr	1947
USA (WV)	Donzel McCray (see above)	"Human bomb"	1	1s 0v (Note: two seriously injured)	13 Jan	1953
USA (TX)	Poe Elementary School bombing by Paul Harold Orgeron	Suitcase bomb	6	1s 5v	15 Sep	1959
USA	Continental Airlines Flight 11 bombed by Thomas G. Doty	Bomb	45	1s 44v	22 May	1962
Israel (Lod)	Lod Airport massacre by JRA	hand grenades and guns	28	1s 1k 26v	30 May	1972
Israel to USA	TWA Flight 841		88	?s 80+v	8 Sep	1974
USA (WV)	Mason County jail bombing	Bomb	5	1s 1k 3v	2 Mar	1976
China	Yangquan theatre bombing	Bomb	32	1s 31v	22 Jul	1981
Japan (Tokyo)	Japan Air Lines Flight 350	Aircraft	24	0s (Note: suicidal pilot survived)	9 Feb	1982
Australia	Attack on Bankstown Airport by Philip Henryk Wozniak in a stolen light aircraft	Aircraft	1	1s 0v (Note: Damaged multiple aircraft on the ground)	16 Sep	1982
New Zealand	Suicide bombing of Wanganui Computer Centre by Neil Roberts	Bomb	1	1s 0v (Note: The target was the computer, not other people, but the computer was mostly in unharmed.)	18 Nov	1982
Sri Lanka (Nelliady)	LTTE militant "Captain Miller"'s bombing of Nelliady Madhya Maha Vidyalayam, which being used as a Sri Lanka Army‑base	Truck bomb	18+	1s/p (Note: He was tied to the car, see Captain Miller (Tamil militant).) 17‑55v	5 Jul	1987
Greece (Poros)	City of Poros ship attack and car bomb (detonated early)	car bomb + others	11	3a 8v	11 Jul	1988
Israel	Tel Aviv-Jerusalem bus 405 suicide attack (attacker survived)	Bus crashed by passenger	16	0s 16v	6 Jul	1989
Northern Ireland	Proxy bombings by Provisional Irish Republican Army	Proxy car bombs	7	1p 6v	24 Oct	1990
The USSR became post-Soviet states	The Dissolution of the Soviet Union (USSR) marked the end of the Cold War era, and the United States became the only remaining superpower.				26 Dec	1991

Table footnotes

== Statistics about the increase ==
Locations of recent suicide attacks
Country	1982 to mid-2015	
Country	Attacks	Deaths
Iraq	1,938	20,084
Pakistan	490	6,287
Afghanistan	1,059	4,748
USA (Note: All 4 attacks were on 11 September 2001, 2997 deaths includes the victims and 19 hijackers.)	4	2,997
Syria	172	2,058
Sri Lanka	115	1,584
Nigeria	103	1,347
Yemen	87	1,128
Lebanon	66	1,007
Somalia	91	829
Russia	86	782
Israel	113	721
Algeria	24	281
Indonesia	10	252
Egypt	21	246
Kenya	2	213
Iran	8	160
Libya	29	155
India	15	123
Turkey	29	115
UK (Note: 7 July 2005 London bombings)	5	78
Palestine	59	67
All other countries	99	674

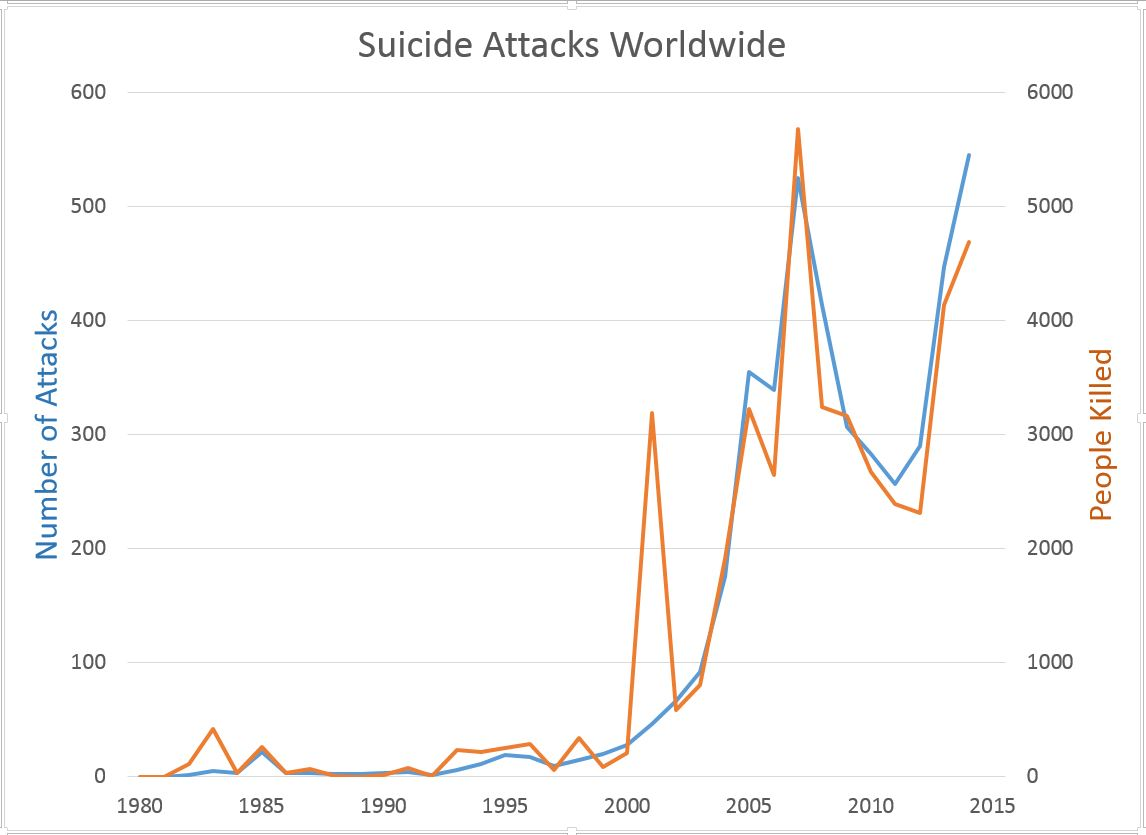
The number of suicide attacks grew enormously after 2000. Number of suicide attacks and deaths from attacks 1982–2014.

Casualties of terrorist incidents worldwide (1976–2016), including suicide attacks and other incidents labelled as terrorism.

Groups who have recently used suicide attacks
Group	1982 to mid-2015	
Group	Attacks	Deaths
Islamic State (Note: includes earlier versions of the group counted separately by the CPOST Suicide Attack Database: Islamic State of Iraq and Syria, and Islamic State of Iraq)	424	4,949
Al-Qaeda (Central)	20	3,391
Taliban (Afghanistan)	665	2,925
Al-Qaeda in Iraq	121	1,541
Tamil Tigers (LTTE)	82	961
Al-Shabab	64	726
Qassam Brigades (Note: military wing of the Islamic Resistance Movement (Hamas))	78	511
Al-Qaeda (Arabian Peninsula)	23	354
Ansar al-Sunna (Iraq)	28	319
Palestinian Islamic Jihad	50	225
Al-Aqsa Martyrs' Brigades	40	107
Taliban (Pakistan)	7	92
Ansar Bait al‑Maqdis	10	84
PKK (Turkey)	10	32
Hezbollah	7	28
Other groups or unidentified attackers	2,547	22,877

Table footnotes

== Post-Cold War and war on terror ==
=== Post-Cold War Palestine ===
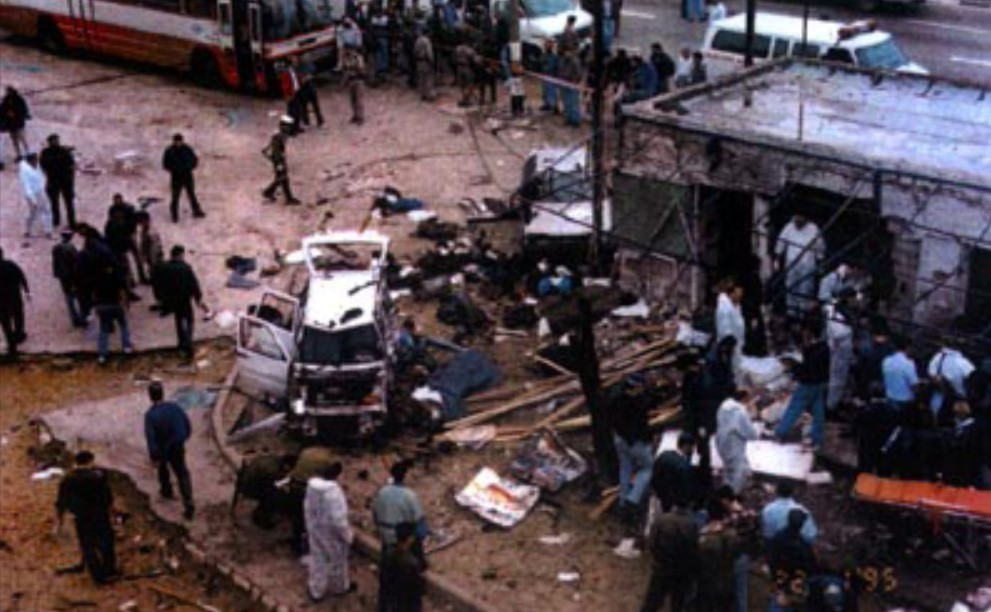
Scene after a Palestinian suicide bombing in 1995.

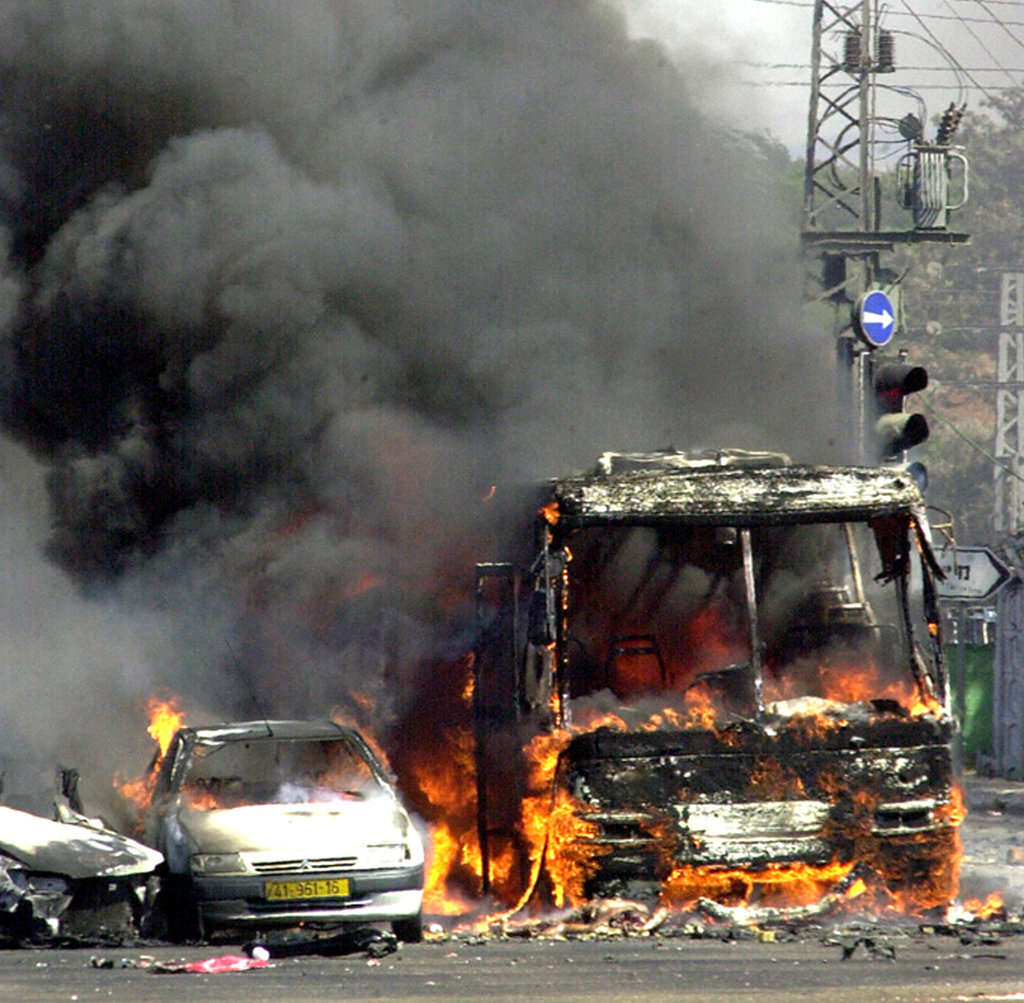
Wreckage vehicles after a 2001 suicide bombing in Beit Lid Junction

Suicide bombing became a popular tactic among Palestinian militant organizations such as Hamas, Islamic Jihad, the Al-Aqsa Martyrs Brigade, and occasionally by the PFLP. The first suicide bombing in post-independence Israel was done by "Hamas" in 1994. Attacks peaked from 2001 to 2003 with over 40 bombings and over 200 killed in 2002. Bombers affiliated with these groups often use so-called "suicide belts", explosive devices which often included shrapnel designed to be strapped to the body under clothing. To maximize the loss of life, the bombers seek out enclosed spaces, such as cafés or city buses crowded with people at rush hour. Less common are military targets such as soldiers waiting for transport at the roadside. These bombings have had more popular support than in other Muslim countries. More music videos and announcements that promise eternal reward for suicide bombers can be found on Palestinian television, according to Palestinian Media Watch. Israeli sources observed that Hamas, Islamic Jihad and Fatah operate "Paradise Camps", training children as young as 11 to become suicide bombers. In 2004, due to increased effectiveness in Israel's security measures and stricter checkpoint protocols, terrorist organizations began employing women and children more frequently as operatives, assuming that they would raise fewer suspicions and undergo less rigorous inspections.

==== Islamic Resistance Movement (Hamas) ====
Islamic Resistance Movement (Hamas) and their militant wing al-Qassam, were formed in the 1980s but avoided using suicide in their political violence until the following decade. The group have utilized suicide intermittently in specific situations. Suicide attempts are a criminal offense in Palestine and many other majority Muslim countries.

Hamas's most sustained suicide bombing campaign from 2003 to 2004 involved several members of Hebron's Masjad (mosque) al-Jihad soccer team. Most lived in the Wad Abu Katila neighborhood and belonged to the al-Qawasmeh hamula (clan). Several were classmates in the neighborhood's local branch of the Palestinian Polytechnic College. Their ages ranged from 18 to 22. At least eight team members were dispatched to suicide shooting and bombing operations by the Hamas military leader in Hebron, Abdullah al-Qawasmeh. Al-Qawasmeh was killed by Israeli forces in June 2003 and succeeded by his relatives Basel al-Qawasmeh, killed in September 2003, and Imad al-Qawasmeh, captured on 133 October 2004. In retaliation for the assassinations of Hamas leaders Sheikh Ahmed Yassin on 22 March 2004 and Abdel Aziz al-Rantissi on 17 April 2004, Imad al-Qawasmeh dispatched Ahmed al-Qawasmeh and Nasim al-Ja'abri for a suicide attack on two buses in Beer Sheva. The attack took place on 31 August 2004. In December 2004, Hamas declared a halt to suicide attacks.

On 15 January 2008, the son of Mahmoud al-Zahar, the leader of Hamas in the Gaza Strip, was killed. Another son had been killed in a 2003 assassination attempt on Zahar. Three days later, Israel Defense Minister Ehud Barak ordered the Israel Defense Forces to seal all border crossings with Gaza, cutting off the flow of supplies to the territory in an attempt to stop rocket barrages on Israeli border towns. Nevertheless, violence from both sides only increased. On 4 February 2008, friends Mohammed Herbawi and Shadi Zghayer, who were members of the Masjad al-Jihad soccer team, staged a suicide bombing at a commercial center in Dimona, Israel. Herbawi had previously been arrested as a 17-year-old on 15 March 2003 shortly after a suicide bombing on Haifa bus, which was done by Mamoud al-Qawasmeh on March 5, 2003. Herbawi had coordinated suicide shooting attacks on Israeli settlements by others on the team, such as on 7 March 2003 with an attack by Muhsein, Hazem al-Qawasmeh, Fadi Fahuri, and Sufian Hariz. He was also involved with another set of suicide bombings in Hebron and Jerusalem on 17 and 18 May 2003 by Fuad al-Qawasmeh, Basem Takruri, and Mujahed al-Ja'abri. Although Hamas claimed responsibility for the Dimona attack, the politburo leadership in Damascus and Beirut was initially unaware of who initiated and carried out the attack. It appears that Ahmad al-Ja'abri, military commander of Hamas's Izz ad-Din al-Qassam Brigades in Gaza, requested the suicide attack through Ayoub Qawasmeh, Hamas's military liaison in Hebron, who knew where to look for eager young men who had self-radicalized together and had already mentally prepared themselves to die.

==== Results of Palestinian suicide attacks ====
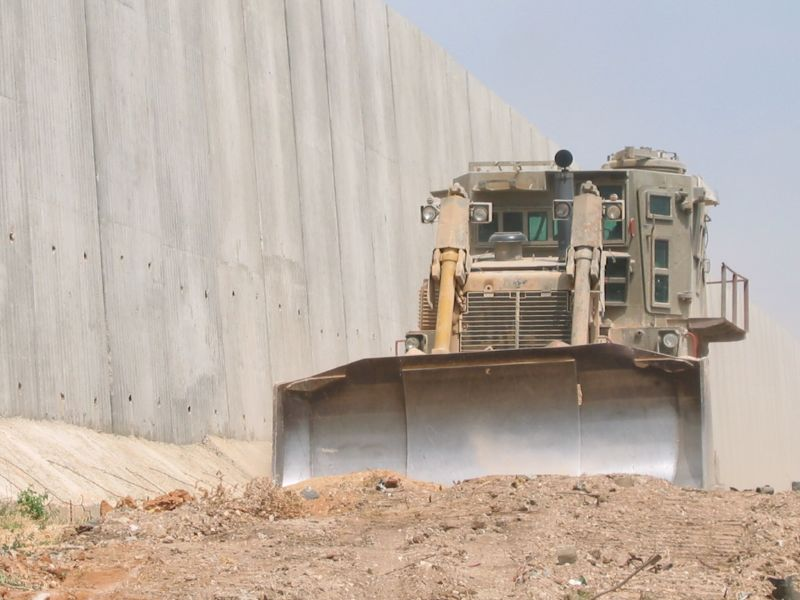
Early Israeli construction of West Bank barrier in 2003.

It is more difficult to determine whether Palestinian suicide bombings have proved to be a successful political tactic. Hamas "came to prominence" after the first intifada as "the main Palestinian opponent of the Oslo Accords", the US-sponsored peace process that oversaw the gradual and partial removal of Israel's occupation in return for Palestinian guarantees to protect Israeli security. according to the BBC. The accords were sidetracked after the 1996 election of right-wing Israeli leader Benjamin Netanyahu. Hamas's suicide bombings of Israeli targets "were widely" credited for the popularity among Israelis of the hardline Netanyahu, from Menachem Begin's Likud party.

The drop in suicide bombings in Israel has been explained by the many security measures taken by the Israeli government, especially the building of the "separation barrier", and a general consensus among Palestinians that the bombings were a "losing strategy". The suicides and other attacks on civilians had "a major impact" on the attitudes of the Israeli public. Instead of creating demoralization, the attacks generated even greater support for the right-wing Likud party which brought to office another hardliner, the former general Ariel Sharon. In 2001, 89% of Israeli Jews supported the Sharon government's policy of "targeted assassinations" of Palestinian militants involved in terrorism against Israel, the number rising to 92% in 2003. Opinion polls of the Jewish Israelis found 78–84% supported the "separation barrier" in 2004.

The "heightened security measures" also affected the target populations. During the bombing campaign, Israelis were questioned by armed guards and given a quick pat down before being let into cafés.

In the West Bank, the IDF has at times demolished homes that belong to families whose children or landlords whose tenants had volunteered for such missions, whether completed or not. An internal review starting in October 2004 brought an end to the policy, but it was resumed in 2014. Other military measures taken during the suicide attack campaign included: a widescale re-occupation of the West Bank and blockading of Palestinian towns; "targeted assassinations" of militants, an approach used since the 1970s; raids against militants suspected of plotting attacks; mass arrests; curfews; stringent travel restrictions; and physical separation from Palestinians via the 650 kilometres (400 mi) Israeli West Bank barrier in and around the West Bank. The Second Intifada and its suicide attacks are often dated as ending around the time of an unofficial ceasefire with some of the most powerful Palestinian militant groups in 2005. A new "knife intifada" started in September 2015. Still, although many Palestinians were killed in the process of stabbing or attempting to stab Israelis, their deaths were not "a precondition for the success" of their mission and so are not considered suicide attacks by many observers.

=== Kurdistan Workers' Party (PKK) ===
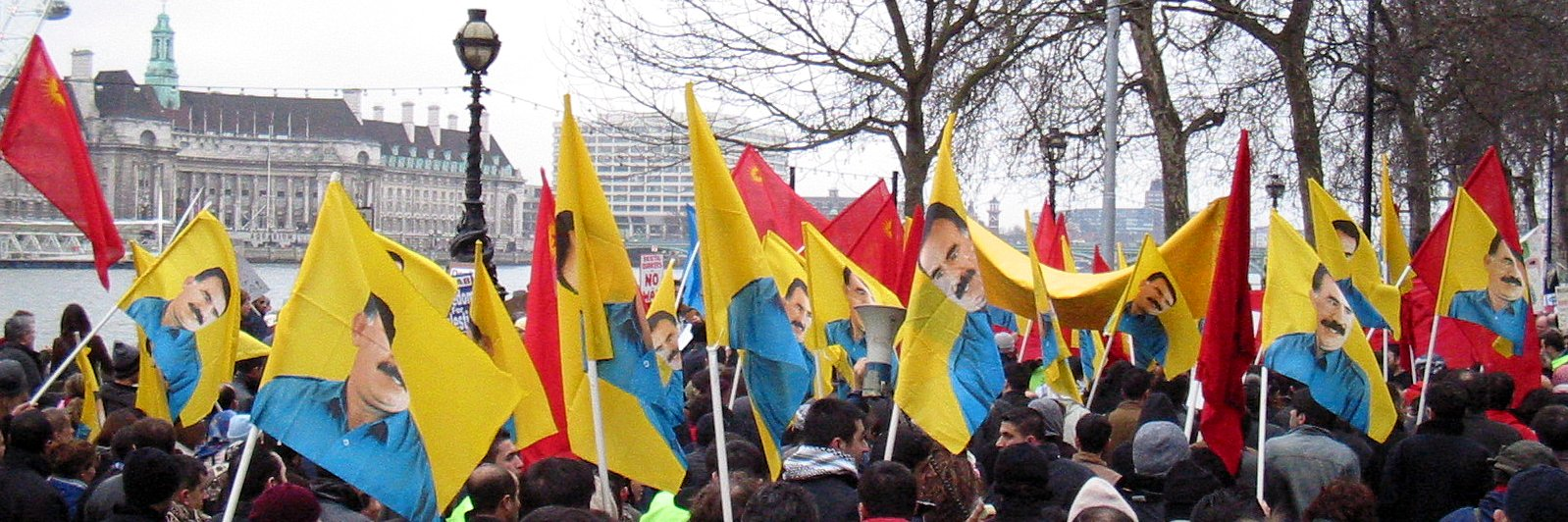
PKK supporters at 2003 march opposing the Iraq War, London

The Kurdistan Workers' Party (PKK), a secular group, have also been involved in suicide attacks. Their first militant action was an unsuccessful attempt to assassinate Mehmet Celal Bucak.

The PKK began their insurgency against the Turkish state in 1984. However, they did not carry out their first suicide attack until the 1990s.

According to the Chicago Project on Security and Terrorism's Suicide Attack Database, as of 2015, ten suicide attacks by the PKK from 1996 to 2012 killed 32 people and injured 116.

On 12 May 2025, the Kurdistan Workers' Party announced it would disband as part of a peace initiative with Turkey.

=== Al-Qaeda begin using suicide in the 1990s ===
Al-Qaeda carried out its first suicide attack in the mid-1990s.

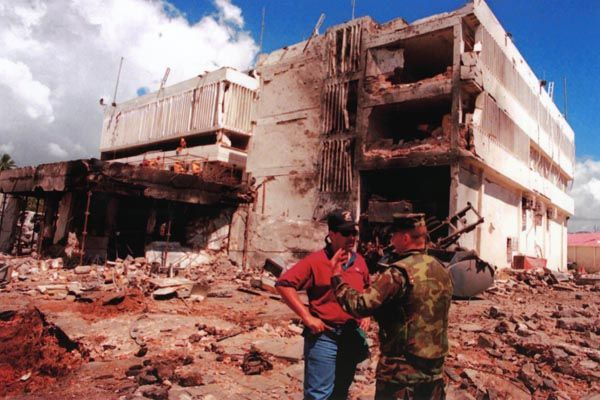
The U.S. Embassy in Dar es Salaam, Tanzania, in the aftermath of 7 August 1998, Al-Qaeda suicide bombing.

=== Start of the 21st Century ===
In early 2000, analyst Yoram Schweitzer saw a pause in bombing campaigns and argued that "most of the groups that were involved in suicide terrorism either stopped using it or eventually reduced it significantly".

==== Narrowing definition of suicide attack ====
The number of attacks using suicide tactics grew from an average of fewer than five per year during the 1980s to 81 suicide attacks in 2001 and 460 in 2005. By 2005, the tactic had spread to dozens of countries. The absolute number increased despite a narrowing of the definition of suicide attacks. The United States government defined "modern" suicide bombing has been defined as "involving explosives deliberately carried to the target either on the person or in a civilian vehicle and delivered by surprise". Noah Feldman's definition excludes attacks, such as the Lod Airport massacre (see above), where "the perpetrator's ensured death" was not "a precondition for the success of his mission" (despite the Lod Airport attack being overtly planned as a suicide attack, and often referred to as such, as well as the surviving attacker wanting the death penalty for himself).

=== Russia and Chechnya ===
Suicide bombings have become a tactic in Chechnya, first being used in the conflict in 2000 in Alkhan Kala. and spreading to Russia, notably with the Moscow theater hostage crisis in 2002 and the Beslan school hostage crisis in 2004.

=== 2001 September 11 attacks and after ===
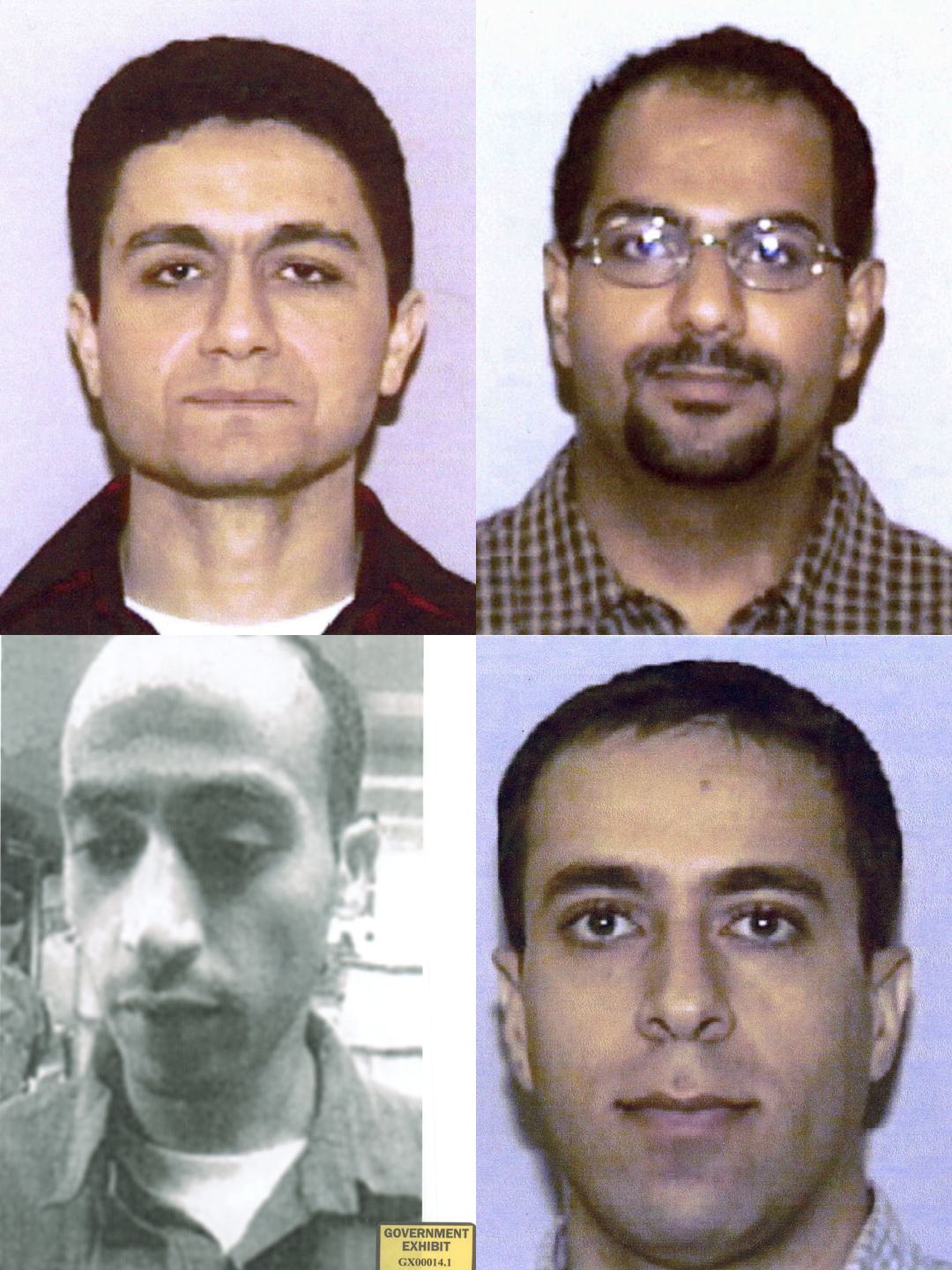
The four hijacker-pilots who deliberately crashed the planes as part of the September 11 attacks. Left to right: Mohamed Atta, Marwan al-Shehhi, Hani Hanjour, Ziad Jarrah

The September 11 attacks in 2001, orchestrated by al-Qaeda, were the deadliest attacks on American soil since the Japanese attack on Pearl Harbor which thrust the United States into World War II. They involved the hijacking of four large passenger jet airliners. Unlike earlier airline hijackings, the primary focus was the planes instead of the passengers because their long transcontinental flight plans meant they carried more fuel, allowing a bigger explosion on impact. American Airlines Flight 11 and United Airlines Flight 175 were deliberately flown into the Twin Towers of the World Trade Center in New York City, destroying both 110-story skyscrapers in less than two hours. American Airlines Flight 77 was flown into the Pentagon (U.S. Department Of Defense Headquarters) in Arlington County, Virginia, causing severe damage to the west side of the building. These attacks resulted in the deaths of 221 people (including the 15 hijackers) on board the three planes as well as 2,731 more in and around the targeted buildings. United Airlines Flight 93 crashed into a field near Shanksville, Pennsylvania after a revolt by the plane's passengers, killing all 44 people (including the four hijackers) on board. In total, the attacks killed 2,996 people and injured more than 6,000 others. (Note: Thousands more were injured. The exact figure is unknown―some sources say 6,000. people were injured, while others go as high as 25,000.) The U.S. stock market closed for four trading days after the attacks in the first unscheduled close since the Great Depression. Nine days after the attack, U.S. President George W. Bush called for a "war on terror". Shortly thereafter he launched the War in Afghanistan to find and capture Osama bin Laden, the leader of al-Qaeda. A copy of The Revolt, memoir of Irgun commander Menachem Begin, was found in one of al-Qaeda's training bases.

==== United States response ====
After the September 11 attacks, at least in the short term, the results were negative for Al-Qaeda, as well as the Taliban. Since the attacks, Western nations have diverted massive resources towards stopping similar actions, as well as increasing border security, and military actions against various countries believed to have been involved with terrorism. Critics of the war on terrorism suggest the results were negative, as the subsequent actions of the United States and other countries has increased the number of recruits and their willingness to carry out suicide bombings.

In the U.S., the post-9/11 era meant "previously inconceivable security measures—in airports and other transportation hubs, hotels and office buildings, sports stadiums and concert halls".

In the United States, the element of suicide in the 9/11 attacks persuaded many that previously unthinkable, "out of the box" strategic policies in a "war on terrorism" were necessary. This included "preventive war" against countries not immediately attacking the U.S., to almost unlimited surveillance of virtually any person in the United States by the government without normal congressional and judicial oversight. These responses "produced their own costs and risks—in lives, national debt, and America's standing in the world".

=== United States invasion of Iraq ===
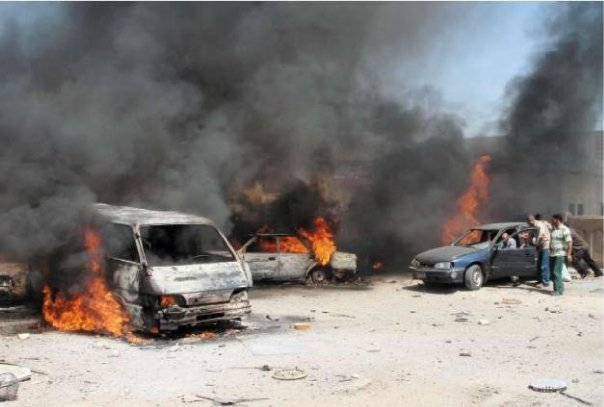
The result of a car bombing in Iraq.

After the invasion of Iraq in 2003 led by the U.S., Iraqi and foreign insurgents carried out waves of suicide bombings. More attacks have been carried out in Iraq than in any other country, with 1,938 as of mid-2015.

In addition to United States military targets, they attacked many civilian targets such as Shiite mosques as well as international offices of the UN and the Red Cross. Iraqi men waiting to apply for jobs with the new army and police force were targets. In the lead up to the Iraqi parliamentary election on 30 January 2005, suicide attacks upon civilian and police personnel involved with the elections increased. There were also reports of the insurgents co-opting disabled people as involuntary suicide bombers.

==== Islamic State in Iraq and Syria (ISIS) ====
The self-declared "Islamic State" (ISIS) (Note: Arabic: داعش, romanized: Da'esh, Hebrew: דאעש, romanized: Da'esh.) use suicide attacks against government targets before they attack. The attackers use a wide range of methods, from suicide vests and belts to bomb trucks and cars and APCs filled with explosives. Usually, the suicide bomber involved in a "martyrdom operation" will record his last words in a martyrdom video before they start their attack, which will be released after the suicide attack is done. A study published by The Guardian in 2017 analyzed 923 attacks done between December 2015 and November 2016 and compared the military tactic to those used by kamikaze operations. Charlie Winter, the author of the study, said that ISIS had "industrialized the concept of martyrdom". 84% of suicide attacks were directed towards military targets, usually with armed vehicles. About 80% of the attackers were of Iraqi or Syrian origin. According to the Institute for National Security Studies, there were fewer suicide attacks worldwide in 2017, but more female suicide bombers participated in them. According to the institute, ISIS and al-Qaeda led the suicide terrorism.

In 2017 and 2019, during the Sinai insurgency, there were suicide bombings in the Gaza Strip by local ISIS sympathizers. ISIS are a global extremist group, with an ideology that fundamentally opposes the Palestinian nationalism of Hamas and the other groups above. In 2017 two Hamas government border guards were killed while attempting to intercept an ISIS suicide bomber at Rafah Crossing. The Hamas government responded to that bombing with a crackdown on followers of "deviant ideologies" (meaning ISIS and similar groups). In 2018, members of ISIS in the Sinai "declared war" on Hamas, demanding Hamas release ISIS militants held in Gaza's prisons. Then in 2019, another suicide attack – also attributed to ISIS – directly targeted Gaza Strip police. Three police officers were killed, all three victims were allegedly members of Hamas. Gaza's Security forces responded by arresting ten people whom they suspected were members of the cell who arranged the attack.

In the following years, ISIS members also carried out suicide attacks in different locations. In December 2018, according to the director of the Syrian Observatory for Human Rights, Rami Abdel Rahman, at least three suicide bombers blew themselves up inside the city of As-Suwayda in the Jabal al-Druze of southern Syria. This was in addition to suicide bombers who attacked seven villages in the surrounding suburbs. According to The Meir Amit Intelligence and Terrorism Information Center, In January 2019, ISIS carried out a suicide bombing attack using a car bomb against a joint American-Kurdish patrol. 2021 Kabul airport attack was suicide bombing attack. In January 2021, ISIS claimed responsibility for a double suicide bombing in a Baghdad market that killed at least 32 people and wounded more than 100. It was the first major suicide attack by the Islamic State group in the previous three years. In June 2025, the Syrian Interior Ministry announced a suicide attack carried out by a member of the Islamic State cult in Church. According to the statement, he shot at worshippers in a church and then blew himself up inside.

=== South and Central Asia ===
==== Afghanistan ====
Other major locations of suicide attack are Afghanistan, with 1,059 attacks as of mid-2015, and Pakistan, with 490 attacks. In the first eight months of 2008, Pakistan overtook Iraq and Afghanistan in suicide bombings, with 28 bombings killing 471 people.

==== Pakistan ====
Shaheed (martyr) Benazir Bhutto, former Prime Minister of Pakistan and leader of the Pakistan People's Party (PPP), was assassinated in a terrorist attack on 27 December 2007. Benazir and 23 other people were killed by a 16-year-old suicide bomber using an explosive belt and used a gun. Bhutto had already survived a previous assassination attempt in Karachi. Following this, many schools and universities were named in honour of her martyrdom.

=== Africa ===
Since 2006, al-Shabaab has carried out major suicide attacks in Somalia, the worst year so far being 2016 with 28 attacks.

=== Western Europe ===
In Europe, four Islamist suicide bombers exploded home-made peroxide explosives on three London underground trains and a bus on 7 July 2005, during the morning rush hour. These "7/7" bombings killed 52 civilians and injured 700.

On 22 May 2017, the Manchester Arena bombing occurred which resulted in 23 deaths and 1,017 injuries. The attack was carried out as people were leaving an Ariana Grande concert.

=== Car bomb suicides in the 2020s ===
On 25 December 2020, a suicide bombing occurred in Nashville, Tennessee.

On 17 May 2025, a 2010 silver Ford Fusion sedan loaded with explosives detonated outside the American Reproductive Centers fertility clinic in Palm Springs, California, resulting in the death of the perpetrator, 25-year-old Guy Edward Bartkus, and injuries to four others. Nearby buildings were damaged and windows were shattered. A tripod and camera were found at the scene. The FBI called it an "intentional act of terrorism". Bartkus reportedly identified himself as the perpetrator of the bombing in a video posted online, an audio recording, and manifesto in which he described himself as a "pro-mortalist" and said people did not give consent to exist. A 32-year-old man named Daniel Jongyon Park was arrested for possible involvement. Park was expelled from Poland to face prosecution on the United States.

== Attacker demographics ==
=== Children and teenagers ===
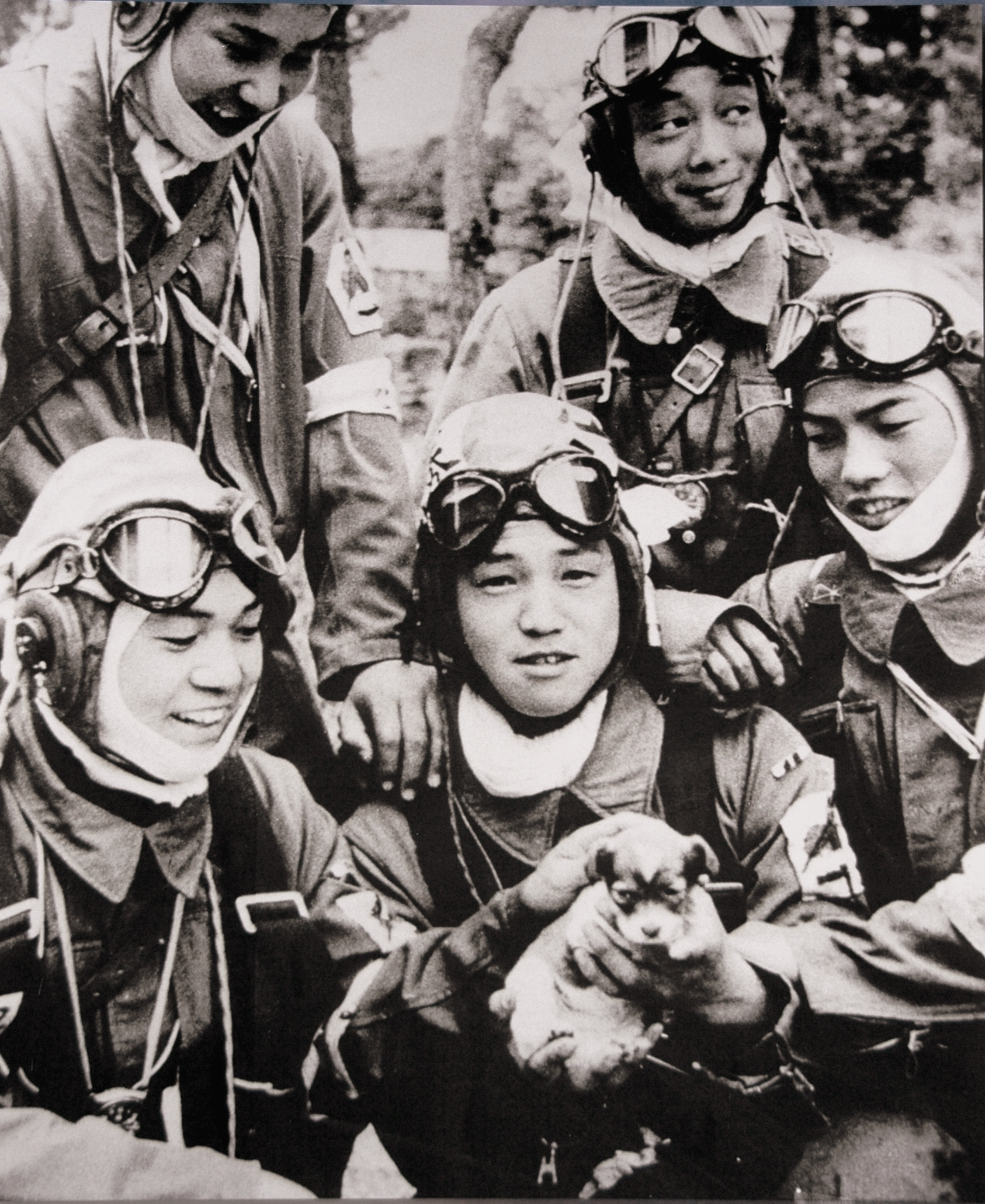
26 May 1945. Corporal Yukio Araki, holding a puppy, with four other pilots of the 72nd Shinbu Squadron at Bansei, Kagoshima. Araki died the following day, at the age of 17, in a suicide attack on ships near Okinawa.

Araki Yukio was born on 10 March 1928, at the age of fifteen he joined the Imperial Japanese Army Air Service's Youth Pilot Training Program. On 27 May 1945, Araki took off from Bansei Airfield, in Kagoshima Prefecture, on a kamikaze mission, flying a Mitsubishi Ki-51. At the age of seventeen, Araki was one of the youngest known kamikaze pilots. It has been speculated that his plane was one of two that struck the USS Braine, killing 66 of her crew; however, the ship did not sink.

There was a heated dispute surrounding the death penalty trial of the Irgun militant who blew himself up in 1947 (see above). He was sentenced to death alongside another militant for their role in the bombing of Jerusalem Train Station, but the other militant later had his sentence commuted to life in prison. There was heated debate about the age of the Irgun suicide militant when he was sentenced. His mother and brother claimed he was 17, too young to be executed according to the law of the British authorities. The court claimed he was 23, because he had served in the British military during World War II, and the British refused to believe they had recruited a minor who was lying about his age. Yehuda Lapidot and the IDF say he was born on 5 October 1927. Surviving relatives disagree, maintaining that he was born in July 1929.

Mohammed Hossein Fahmideh, a 13-year-old Iranian boy who fought in the Iran–Iraq War, is said – by former CIA operative Robert Baer – to be the first Muslim to have participated in such an attack in contemporary history. The boy strapped rocket-propelled grenades to his chest and blew himself up under an Iraqi tank in November 1980. Ayatollah Khomeini declared Fahmideh a national hero. According to Robert Baer, the boy was used as an inspiration for further volunteers for martyrdom. The Iranian website, Tebyan Cultural Institute describes the child's death as heroic. According to former CIA officer Robert Baer, "Ayatollah Khomeini's embattled Islamic republic adopted Fahmideh as a national hero and as an inspiration for further bloodshed and martyrdom".

In Lebanon on 9 April 1985, Sana'a Mehaidli, a 16-year-old member of the Syrian Social Nationalist Party (SSNP), detonated an explosive-laden vehicle that killed two Israeli soldiers and injured twelve more. She is often described as the first female suicide bomber. She is known as "the Bride of the South". During the Lebanese Civil War, female SSNP members bombed Israeli troops and the Israeli proxy militia, the South Lebanon Army.

Dylan Klebold was 17 and Eric Harris was 18 when they carried out a suicide attack on Columbine High School. It was originally planned as a bombing, ending in a double car bombing, but the bombs failed to detonate, so they shot their victims instead, then both shot themselves in the head.

Italian Australian teenager Jake Bilardi was 18 years old when he travelled to the Iraq to carry out a suicide attack for an ISIS-linked group. His attack targeted the Iraqi Army, who claimed they sustained no casualties. His death was used in ISIS propaganda. The death of a young English-speaking foreigner also attracted far more mainstream media attention than most of the group's suicide attacks. One Australian newspaper described the 18-year-old man as having been "groomed".

Talha Asmal, a 17-year-old, is the youngest suicide bomber in British history. He ran away from his home in Dewsbury, West Yorkshire in March 2015 to join ISIS, and in June he participated in a suicide attack in Iraq, detonating a vehicle full of explosives. He was part of a team of suicide bombers who targeted forces near an oil refinery south of Baiji. At least eleven people were reported to have been killed in the attack. ISIS published photos of Talha taken right before the attack. His parents stated they believed their son had been groomed and exploited by jihadists, whom they said deliberately targeted him in his "tender years and naivety." They urged others who fear their relatives might be becoming radicalized to contact the authorities.

=== Women ===
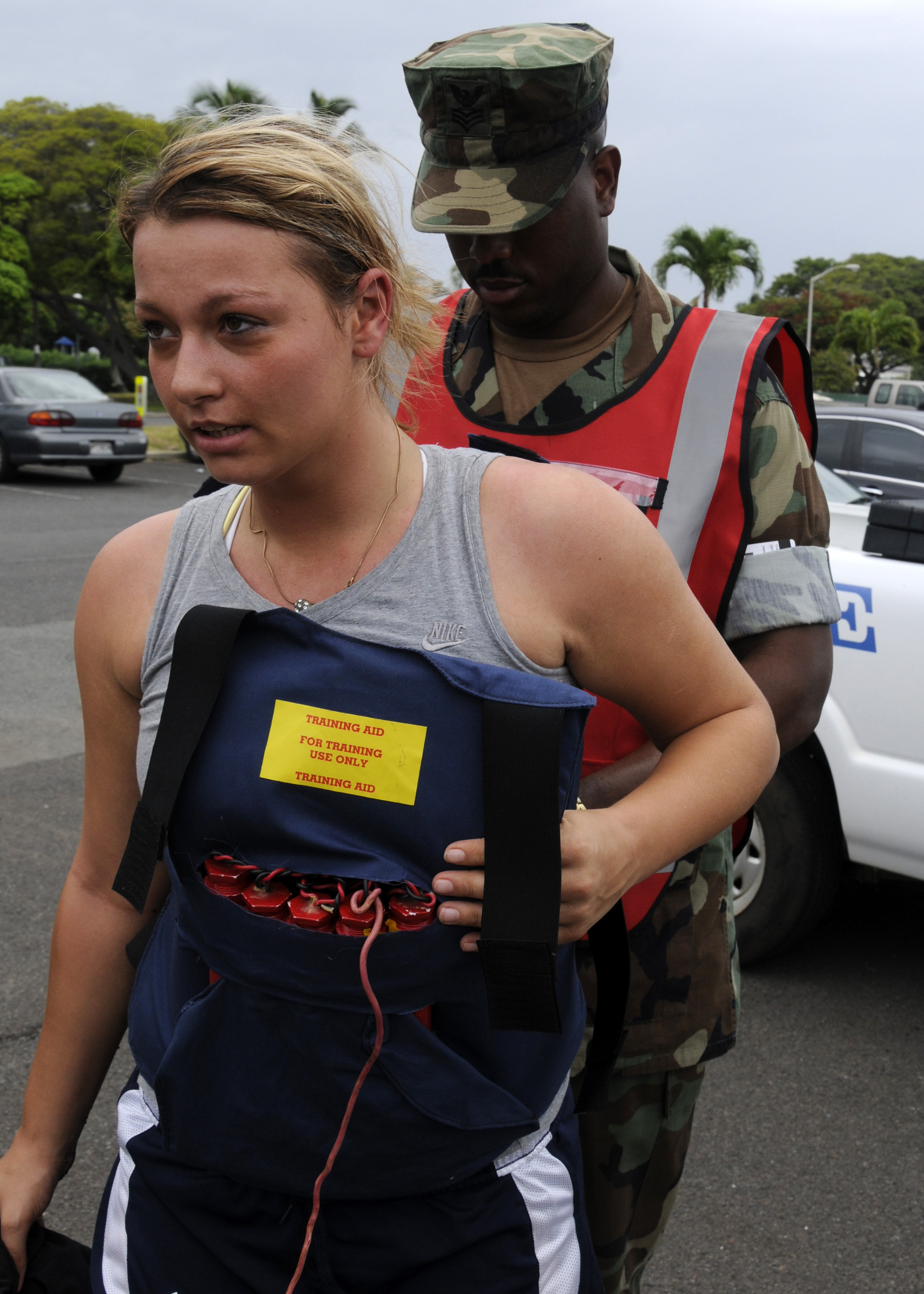
A U.S. Navy servicewoman poses as a captured female suicide bomber during the OPFOR exercise in Pearl Harbor, Hawaii

Female suicide bombers are women who undertake suicide attacks. Suicide bombers are normally viewed as male political radicals, but since the 1960s, female suicide attacks have been on the rise. Through 1985–2006, 15% of all suicide attacks were conducted by female suicide bombers.

There are many organizations, such as Boko Haram (which is the first group to use women in a majority of their suicide bombings and surpassed the Tamil Tigers in using more female suicide bombers than any other terrorist group in history), Al-Shabaab, ISIS and the Al Aqsa Martyrs Brigade, that recently started using women as tools in their attacks, since they are normally viewed as less of a threat than their male counterparts. This includes women having the element of surprise, a hesitancy to search women, increased publicity for female suicide bombing attacks, and the female stereotype as non-violent.

Research shows that female suicide bombers tend to replace depleted male cadres and tend to exhibit little active participation or inadequate training. An analysis of suicide attacks over the period 1985-2017 finds that female suicide bombers inflict fewer fatalities than their male counterparts.

==== Gendered motivations ====
In some traditions, women are customarily seen as peace-makers rather than as front-line actors in conflicts. This stereotype has made them useful as suicide bombers, because they might be underestimated and thus be able to enter target areas inconspicuously, leading to more lethal suicide attacks. Whether women's motivations for becoming suicide bombers generally differ from men's remains a pertinent question. Bloom has suggested some salient reasons for women to turn to suicide bombings, such as "to avenge a personal loss, to redeem the family name, to escape a life of sheltered monotony and achieve fame, or to equalize the patriarchal societies in which they live". Some earlier literature suggested that women tend to be motivated by personal trauma rather than by ideological reasons. Other researchers disagree with this assessment and state that it reduces women's political agency, seeing as they are just as capable of making a choice based on ideology. Women's as well as men's usual motivations for becoming suicide bombers should be assumed to be nuanced and complex.

== Tactics and strategies ==
=== Devices ===
Various groups adapt their strategies to suit specific targets. For example, in the 1980s, Hezbollah favored the use of explosive-laden cars, while the LTTE in Sri Lanka employed tactics involving explosive-laden boats. Palestinian organizations in the 1990s refined an approach involving suicide bombers with explosive belts, influencing groups like the Chechens and the PKK. In contemporary Iraq, local factions have utilized explosive-laden vehicles to target heavily guarded military facilities. Decades earlier, the Lehi militant group were discovered to have constructed a "coat bomb", with explosives concealed by being stitched inside the coat. They appear to have attempted to use it in a non-suicide bombing, taking it off and leaving it behind in the targeted building, but it failed to detonate for unclear reasons. They also used it for smuggling explosives into England.

=== Strategic advantages ===
According to author Jeffrey William Lewis, success campaigns of suicide bombing require: willing individuals, organisations to train and use them, and a society willing to accept such acts in the name of a greater good. The organisations work to guarantee individual suicide bombers that they "will be remembered as martyrs dying for their communities". By imbuing suicide attacks with "reverence and heroism", it becomes more attractive to recruits. According to Yoram Schweitzer, modern suicide terrorism is "aimed at causing devastating physical damage, through which it inflicts profound fear and anxiety". Its goal is not to produce a negative psychological effect only on the victims of the actual attack, but on the entire target population. Attackers themselves have often framed suicide attacks as acts of courageous self-sacrifice made necessary by the superior military or security strength of the enemy. The technique has also been called "the atomic weapon of the weak". According to Hamas founder Sheikh Ahmed Yassin, "Once we have warplanes and missiles, then we can think of changing our means of legitimate self-defense. But right now, we can only tackle the fire with our bare hands and sacrifice ourselves".

A major reason for the popularity of suicide attacks, despite the sacrifice involved for its perpetrators, is its tactical advantages over other types of terrorism such as the ability to conceal weapons, make last-minute adjustments, an increased ability to infiltrate heavily guarded targets, and the lack of need for remote or delayed detonation, escape plans or rescue teams. Robert Pape observed that "Suicide attacks are an especially convincing way to signal the likelihood of more pain to come, because if you are willing to kill yourself you are also willing to endure brutal retaliation. [...] The element of suicide itself helps increase the credibility of future attacks because it suggests that attackers cannot be deterred". Other scholars have criticized Pape's research design, arguing that it cannot draw any conclusions on the efficacy of suicide terrorism.

Bruce Hoffman described the characteristics of suicide bombing as "universal" — "Suicide bombings are inexpensive and effective. They are less complicated and compromising than other kinds of terrorist operations. They guarantee media coverage. The suicide terrorist is the ultimate smart bomb. Perhaps most important, coldly efficient bombings tear at the fabric of trust that holds societies together".

Suicide bombings are often followed by heightened security measures and reprisals by their targets. Because a deceased suicide bomber cannot be targeted, the response is often a targeting of those believed to have sent the bomber. Because the threat of retaliation cannot deter future attacks if the attackers were already willing to kill themselves, pressure is great to employ intensive surveillance of virtually any potential perpetrator, "to look for them almost everywhere, even if no evidence existed that they were there at all".

== Motivation for attacks ==
According to Bruce Hoffman (quoting the RAND Corporation) and Assaf Moghadam, suicide attacks distinguish themselves from other terror attacks due to their heightened lethality and destructiveness. Perpetrators benefit from the ability to conceal weapons and make last-minute adjustments, and there is no need for escape plans or rescue teams. There is also no need to conceal their identities. (Note: However, some suicide attackers have attempted to multilate themselves in ways that would conceal their identities.) In the case of suicide bombings, they do not require remote or delayed detonation. Although they accounted for only 4% of all "terrorist attacks" between 1981 and 2006, they resulted in 32% of terrorism-related deaths at 14,599 deaths. 90% of these attacks occurred in Afghanistan, Iraq, Israel, Palestine, Pakistan, and Sri Lanka. By mid-2015, approximately three-quarters of all suicide attacks occurred in just three countries: Afghanistan, Pakistan, and Iraq.

William Hutchinson describes suicide attacks as a weapon of psychological warfare aimed at instilling fear in the target population, undermining areas where the public feels secure, and eroding the "fabric of trust that holds societies together." This weapon is further used to demonstrate the lengths perpetrators will go to achieve their goals. Motivations for suicide attackers vary. Kamikaze pilots acted under military orders, while other attacks have been driven by religious or nationalist purposes. According to analyst Robert Pape, prior to 2003, most attacks targeted occupying forces. For example, 90% of attacks in Iraq before the civil war started in 2003 aimed at forcing out occupying forces. Pape's tabulation of suicide attacks runs from 1980 to early 2004 in Dying to Win, and to 2009 in Cutting the Fuse. According to American-French anthropologist Scott Atran, from 2000 to 2004, the ideology of Islamist martyrdom played a predominant role in motivating the majority of bombers.

=== Recent attacker profiles and motivations ===
Studies of who becomes a suicide attacker and what motivates them have often come to different conclusions. According to Riaz Hassan,

apart from one demographic attribute—that the majority of suicide bombers tend to be young males—the evidence has failed to find a stable set of demographic, psychological, socioeconomic and religious variables that can be causally linked to suicide bombers' personality or socioeconomic origins.

Anthropologist Scott Atran wrote, "[Terrorists] are not sufficiently different from everyone else. Insights into homegrown jihadi attacks will have to come from understanding group dynamics, not individual psychology. Small-group dynamics can trump individual personality to produce horrific behavior in otherwise ordinary people. Atran's research has found that the attacks are not organized from the top down, but occur from the bottom up. It is usually a matter of following one's friends and ending up in environments that foster groupthink. Atran is also critical of the claim that terrorists simply crave destruction; rather, they are often motivated by beliefs they hold sacred, as well as their moral reasoning.

A study of the remains of 110 suicide bombers in Afghanistan for the first part of 2007 by Afghan pathologist Yusef Yadgari found 80% were suffering from physical ailments such as missing limbs (before the blasts), cancer, or leprosy. Also, in contrast to earlier findings of suicide bombers, the Afghan bombers were "not celebrated like their counterparts in other Arab nations. Afghan bombers are not featured on posters or in videos as martyrs". Menachem Begin called his only known suicide militant as "Meir the Stump", a reference to his amputated left arm.

Robert Pape, director of the Chicago Project on Suicide Terrorism, found the majority of suicide bombers came from the educated middle classes. For example, Humam Balawi, who perpetrated the Camp Chapman attack in Afghanistan in 2010, was a medical doctor.

A 2004 paper by Harvard University Professor of Public Policy Alberto Abadie "cast[s] doubt on the widely held belief that terrorism stems from poverty, finding instead that terrorist violence is related to a nation's level of political freedom", with countries "in some intermediate range of political freedom" more prone to terrorism than countries with "high levels" of political freedom or countries with "highly authoritarian regimes". "When governments are weak, political instability is elevated, so conditions are favorable for the appearance of terrorism". A 2020 study found that while well-educated and economically well-off individuals are more likely to be behind suicide terrorism, it is not because these individuals self-select into suicide terrorism, but rather because terrorist groups are more likely to select high-quality individuals to commit suicide terrorist attacks.

Pape found that among Islamic suicide terrorists, 97 percent were unmarried and 84 percent were male. If the Kurdistan Workers' Party was excluded, this changed to be 91 percent male. A study conducted by the U.S. military in Iraq in 2008 found that suicide bombers were almost always single men without children aged 18 to 30, with a mean age of 22, and were typically students or employed in blue-collar occupations. In a 2011 doctoral thesis, anthropologist Kyle R. Gibson reviewed three studies documenting 1,208 suicide attacks from 1981 to 2007 and found that countries with higher polygyny rates correlated with greater production of suicide terrorists. Political scientists Valerie M. Hudson and Bradley Thayer noted that countries where polygyny is widely practiced tend to have higher homicide rates and rates of rape. The pair have argued that because Islam is the only major religious tradition where polygyny is still largely condoned, the higher degrees of marital inequality in Islamic countries compared to most of the world causes them to have larger populations susceptible to suicide terrorism. Hudson and Theyer contended that promises of harems of virgins for martyrdom serves as a mechanism to mitigate in-group conflict within Islamic countries by redirecting their violence towards out-groups.

Along with his research on the Tamil Tigers, Scott Atran found that Palestinian jihadist groups such as Hamas provide monthly stipends, lump-sum payments, and prestige to the families of suicide terrorists. Cognitive scientist Steven Pinker argues in The Better Angels of Our Nature (2011) that because the families of men in the West Bank and Gaza often cannot afford bride prices and that many potential brides end up in polygynous marriages, the financial compensation of an act of suicide terrorism can buy enough brides for a man's brothers to have children to make the self-sacrifice pay off in terms of kin selection and biological fitness.

Motivations vary greatly and are different in the case of each individual. Fanaticism (nationalist, religious, or both) may result from brain-washing, negative experiences regarding "the enemy", and the lack of a perspective in life. Suicide attackers may want to hurt or kill their targets because they hold them responsible for all bad things that have happened to them or in the world, or simply just because they want to escape misery and poverty. Based on biographies of more than seven hundred foreign fighters uncovered at an Iraqi insurgent camp, researchers believe that the motivation for suicide missions at least in Iraq was not "the global jihadi ideology", but "an explosive mix of desperation, pride, anger, sense of powerlessness, local tradition of resistance, and religious fervor".

Criminal justice professor Adam Lankford argues that suicide terrorists are not psychologically normal or stable. They are motivated to suicide and killing to mask their desire to die beneath a "veneer of heroic action" because of the religious consequences of killing themselves outright. He has identified more than 130 individual suicide terrorists, including 9/11 ringleader Mohamed Atta, with classic suicidal risk factors such as depression, post-traumatic stress disorder, other mental health problems, drug addictions, serious physical injuries or disabilities, having suffered the unexpected death of a loved one, or other personal crises.

==== Nationalist resistance and religion ====
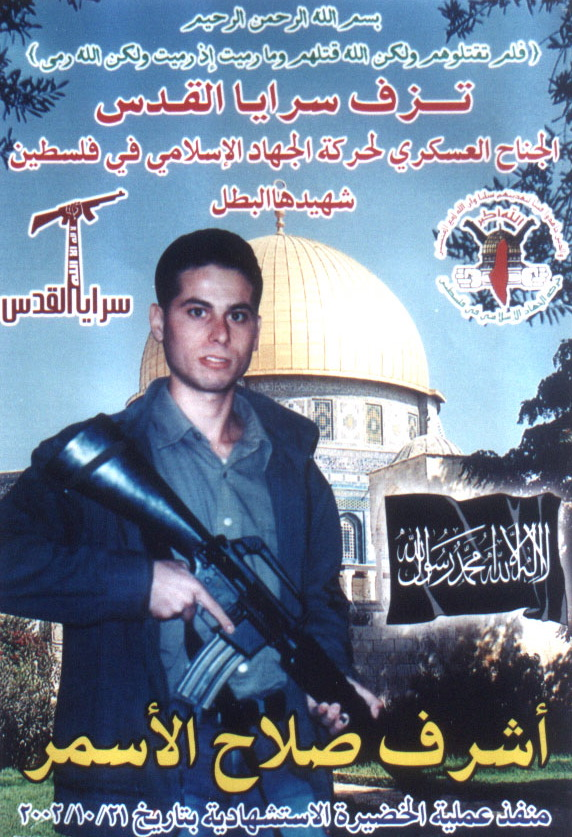
A 2002 Commemorative poster of Palestinian Islamic Jihad suicide bomber Ashraf Sallah Alasmar in Jenin.

According to Robert Pape, director of the Chicago Project on Suicide Terrorism, as of 2005, 95 percent of suicide attacks have the same specific strategic goal. This goal is to cause an occupying state to withdraw forces from a disputed territory, making nationalism their principal motivation rather than religion.

Alternately, another source found that in Lebanon from 1983 to 1999, it was Islamists who influenced secular nationalists. Their use of suicide attacks spread to the secular groups. Five Lebanese groups "espousing a non-religious nationalist ideology" followed the lead of Islamist groups in attacking by suicide, "impressed by the effectiveness of Hezbollah's attacks in precipitating the withdrawal of the 'foreigners' from Lebanon". In Israel suicide attacks by Islamist Islamic Jihad and Hamas also preceded those of the secular PFLP and the Al-Fatah-linked Al-Aqsa Martyrs' Brigades. However, the first suicide attack in post-independence Israel was in 1972, by foreign fighters from the Japanese Red Army (a secular militant group) allied to PFLP-EO unit (a secular group, led by Wadie Haddad).

Pape found other factors associated with suicide attacks. This included the government of the targeted country being democratic and the public opinion of the country playing a role in determining policy. He also found that a difference in religion between the attackers and occupiers, and grassroots support for the attacks contributed. Other factors include attackers being disproportionately from the educated middle classes, high levels of brutality and cruelty by the occupiers, and competition among militant groups fighting the occupiers.

Other researchers, such as Yotam Feldner, argue that perceived religious rewards after death are instrumental in encouraging Muslims to commit suicide attacks. These researchers contend that Pape's analysis is flawed, particularly his contention that democracies are the main targets of such attacks. Other scholars have criticized Pape's research design, arguing that it cannot draw any conclusions on the causes of suicide terrorism.

Atran argues that suicide bombing has moved on from the days of Pape's study, where non-Islamic groups have carried out very few bombings since 2003. Instead, bombing by Muslim or Islamist groups associated with a "global ideology" of "martyrdom" has skyrocketed. In 2004 in Iraq alone, there were 400 suicide attacks and 2,000 casualties. Other researchers question why prominent anti-occupation secular terrorist groups have not used suicide, such as the Provisional IRA, ETA, or anti-colonialist insurgents in Vietnam, Algeria, and elsewhere. They also question Pape omits that the first suicide attack in Lebanon targeted the embassy of Iraq, a country that was not occupying Lebanon.

Mia Bloom agrees with Pape that competition among insurgents groups is a significant motivator, arguing the growth in suicide as a tactic is a product of "outbidding". That is, the need by competing insurgent groups to demonstrate their commitment to the cause to the broader public. This is achieved as making the ultimate sacrifice for the insurgency is a "bid" impossible to top. This explains its use by Palestinian groups, but not that by the Tamil Tigers. Still other researchers have identified sociopolitical factors as more central in the motivation of suicide attackers than religion.

According to Atran, and former CIA case officer Marc Sageman, support for suicide actions is triggered by moral outrage at perceived attacks against Islam and sacred values. However, this is converted to action as a result of small-world factors, such as being part of a football club with other jihadis. Millions express sympathy with global jihad. According to a 2006 Gallup study involving more than 50,000 interviews in dozens of countries, seven percent of the world's 1.3 billion Muslims consider the 9/11 attacks "completely justified".

Assaf Moghadam also argues that the increase in "suicide terrorism" since 2001 is driven by Salafi jihadist ideology and Al-Qaeda.

Updating his work in a 2010 book Cutting the Fuse, Pape reported that a close analysis of the time and location of attacks strongly support his conclusion that "foreign military occupation accounts for 98.5%—and the deployment of American combat forces for 92%—of all the 1,833 suicide terrorist attacks around the world" between 2004 and 2009. Pape wrote that, "the success attributed to the surge in 2007 and 2008 was actually less the result of an increase in coalition forces and more to a change of strategy in Baghdad and the empowerment of the Sunnis in Anbar".

The same logic can be seen in Afghanistan. In 2004 and early 2005, NATO occupied the north and west, which was controlled by the Northern Alliance, whom NATO had previously helped fight the Taliban. An enormous spike in suicide terrorism only occurred later in 2005 as NATO moved into the south and east, which had previously been controlled by the Taliban, and locals were more likely to see NATO as a foreign occupation threatening local culture and customs. Critics argue the logic cannot be seen in Pakistan, which has no occupation and the second highest number of suicide bombing fatalities as of mid-2015.

==== Islam and related religions ====
What connection the high percentage of suicide attacks executed by Islamist groups since 1980 has to do with the religion of Islam is disputed. Specifically, scholars, researchers, and others disagree over whether Islam forbids suicide in the process of attacking enemies, or the killing of civilians. According to a report compiled by the Chicago Project on Suicide Terrorism, 224 of 300 suicide terror attacks from 1980 to 2003 involved Islamist groups or took place in Muslim-majority countries. Another tabulation found more than a fourfold increase in suicide bombings in the two years following Pape's study and that the overwhelming majority of these bombers were motivated by the ideology of Islamist martyrdom. For example, as of early 2008, 1,121 Muslim suicide bombers have blown themselves up in Iraq.

===== Recent perpetration of suicide attacks by Muslims =====
Sunni Muslims were possibly the last major branch of the Abrahamic religions to resort to overt suicide attacks. Islamic suicide bombing is a fairly recent phenomenon. It was absent from the 1979–1989 Afghan jihad against the Soviet Union, an asymmetrical war where the mujahideen fought Soviet warplanes, helicopters and tanks primarily with light weapons. According to author Sadakat Kadri, "the very idea that Muslims might blow themselves up for God was unheard of before 1983, and it was not until the early 1990s that anyone anywhere had tried to justify killing innocent Muslims who were not on a battlefield". After 1983, the process was limited among Muslims to Hezbollah and other Lebanese Shia factions for more than a decade.

Since then, according to Noah Feldman, videotaped pre-confession of faith by attackers known as the "vocabulary of martyrdom and sacrifice" have become part of "Islamic cultural consciousness" and these confessions are "instantly recognizable" to Muslims. The tactic has spread through the Muslim world "with astonishing speed and on a surprising course". "First the targets were American soldiers, then mostly Israelis, including women and children. From Lebanon and Israel, the technique of suicide bombing moved to Iraq, where the targets have included mosques and shrines, and the intended victims have mostly been Shia Iraqis. ... [In] Afghanistan, ... both the perpetrators and the targets are orthodox Sunni Muslims. Not long ago, a bombing in Lashkar Gah, the capital of Helmand Province, killed Muslims, including women, who were applying to go on pilgrimage to Mecca. Overall, the trend is definitively in the direction of Muslim-on-Muslim violence. By a conservative accounting, more than three times as many Iraqis have been killed by suicide bombings in just three years (2003–6) as have Israelis in ten (from 1996 to 2006). Suicide bombing has become the archetype of Muslim violence;– not just to Westerners but also to Muslims themselves".

Recent research on the rationale of suicide bombing has identified both religious and sociopolitical motivations. Those who cite religious factors as an important influence note that religion provides the framework because the bombers believe they are acting in the name of Islam and will be rewarded as martyrs. Since martyrdom is seen as a step towards paradise, those who commit suicide while discarding their community from a common enemy believe that they will reach an ultimate salvation after they die.

In the media attention given to suicide bombing during the Second Intifada and after 9/11, sources hostile to radical Islamism quoted radical scholars promising various heavenly rewards, such as 70 virgins (Arabic: houri) as wives, to Muslims who die as martyrs, specifically as suicide attackers. Other alleged rewards for those dying are being cleansed of all sin and brought directly to paradise, and not having to wait for the Day of Judgement.

Others, such as As'ad AbuKhalil, maintain that "the tendency to dwell on the sexual motives" of the suicide bombers "belittles" the bombers "sociopolitical causes", and that the alleged "sexual frustration" of young Muslim men "has been overly emphasized in the Western and Israeli media" as a motive for terrorism. Suicide is criminalised many in majority-Muslim countries (see above).

===== Support for "martyrdom operations" and analogous concepts =====
Islamist militant organizations including al-Qaeda, Hamas, and Palestinian Islamic Jihad argue that, despite what some Muslims claim is Islam's strict prohibition of suicide and murder, suicide attacks fulfill the obligation of jihad against the "oppressor", "martyrs" will be rewarded with paradise, and have the support of some Muslim clerics. Clerics have supported suicide attacks largely in connection with the Palestinian issue. Prominent Sunni cleric Yusuf al-Qaradawi had previously supported such attacks by Palestinians in perceived defense of their homeland as heroic and an act of resistance. Shia Lebanese cleric Muhammad Husayn Fadlallah, the spiritual authority recognized by Hezbollah, holds similar views.

The articles maintains that Abu Huraira, a companion of the Muhammad, and Umar ibn Khattab, the second caliph of Islam, approved acts which Muslims knew would lead to certain death. The Islamic prophet Muhammad also approved of such acts, according to authors Maulana Muawiya Hussaini and Ikrimah Anwar who cited numerous Hadith of Muhammad on the authority of Islamic jurist Muslim ibn al-Hajjaj. "The Sahaba [companions of the Islamic prophet Muhammad] who carried out the attacks almost certainly knew that they were going to be killed during their operations but they still carried them out and such acts were extolled and praised in the sharia."

==== Opposition and responses from Muslim scholars ====
Others, such as Middle East historian Bernard Lewis, disagree: "... a clear difference was made between throwing oneself to certain death at the hands of an overwhelmingly strong enemy, and dying by one's own hand. The first, if conducted in a properly authorized [ jihad ], was a passport to heaven; the second to damnation. The blurring of their previously vital distinction was the work of some twentieth-century theologians who outlined the new theory which the suicide bombers put into practice".

The distinction from engaging in an act where the perpetrator plans to fight to the death but where the attack does not require their death is important to at least one Islamist terror group, Lashkar-e-Taiba (LeT). While the group extols "martyrdom" and has killed many civilians, LeT believes suicide attacks where the attackers die by their own hand, such as by pressing a detonation button, are haram (forbidden). Its "trademark" is that of perpetrators fighting "to the death" but escaping "if practical". "This distinction has been the subject of extensive discourse among radical Islamist leaders".

Several Western and Muslim scholars of Islam have posited that suicide attacks are a clear violation of classical Islamic law, and characterized such attacks against civilians as murderous and sinful.

According to Bernard Lewis, "the emergence of the now widespread terrorism practice of suicide bombing is a development of the 20th century. It has no antecedents in Islamic history, and no justification in terms of Islamic theology, law, or tradition." Islamic legal rules of armed warfare or military jihad are covered in detail in the classical texts of Islamic jurisprudence, which forbid the killing of women, children, or non-combatants, and the destruction of cultivated or residential areas.

For more than a millennium, these tenets were accepted by Sunnis and Shiites. However, since the 1980s militant Islamists have challenged the traditional Islamic rules of warfare to justify suicide attacks.

Several respected Muslim scholars have provided scholastic refutations of suicide bombings, condemning them as terrorism prohibited in Islam and leading their perpetrators to hell. In his over 400 page long Fatwa on Terrorism condemning suicide attacks, Muslim Islamic scholar Muhammad Tahir-ul-Qadri directly disputed the rationale of Islamists. He argues that indiscriminately killing both Muslims and non-Muslims is unlawful, and brings the Muslim ummah into disrepute, no matter how lofty the killers intentions. Tahir-ul-Qadri states terrorism "has no place in Islamic teaching, and no justification can be provided to it [...] good intention cannot justify a wrong and forbidden act".

Grand Mufti Saudi Arabia, Abdul-Aziz ibn Abdullah Al Shaykh, issued a fatwa on 12 September 2013 that suicide bombings are "great crimes" and bombers are "criminals who rush themselves to hell by their actions". Al Shaykh described suicide bombers as "robbed of their minds [...] who have been used [as tools] to destroy themselves and societies". "In view of the fast-moving dangerous developments in the Islamic world, it is very distressing to see the tendencies of permitting or underestimating the shedding of blood of Muslims and those under protection in their countries. The sectarian or ignorant utterances made by some of these people would benefit none other than the greedy, vindictive and envious people. Hence, we would like to draw attention to the seriousness of the attacks on Muslims or those who live under their protection or under a pact with them|Al Shaykh, quoting a number of verses from the Qur'an and Hadith". Even countries that have a history of suicide attacks, and have regarded them as martyrdom, have condemned them in situations they see as illegitimate.

Following the 2005 Bangladesh bombings by the banned outfit Jama'atul Mujahideen Bangladesh (JMB), chief cleric of Bangladesh Ubaidul Haq led a protest of ulema denouncing terrorism. He said: "Islam prohibits suicide bombings. These bombers are enemies of Islam. [...] It is a duty for all Muslims to stand up against those who are killing people in the name of Islam".

In January 2006, Shia Marja (high ranking cleric) Ayatollah al-Udhma Yousof al-Sanei decreed a fatwa against suicide bombing, declaring it a "terrorist act". In 2005, Muhammad Afifi al-Akiti also issued a fatwa "Against The Targeting Of Civilians".

American based Islamic jurist and scholar Khaled Abou Al-Fadl argues, "The classical jurists, nearly without exception, argued that those who attack by stealth, while targeting noncombatants in order to terrorize the resident and wayfarer, are corrupters of the earth. "Resident and wayfarer" was a legal expression that meant that whether the attackers terrorize people in their urban centers or terrorize travelers, the result was the same: all such attacks constitute a corruption of the earth. The legal term given to people who act this way was muharibun (those who wage war against society), and the crime is called the crime of hiraba (waging war against society). The crime of hiraba was so serious and repugnant that, according to Islamic law, those guilty of this crime were considered enemies of humankind and were not to be given quarter or sanctuary anywhere .... Those who are familiar with the classical tradition will find the parallels between what were described as crimes of hiraba and what is often called terrorism today nothing short of remarkable. The classical jurists considered crimes such as assassinations, setting fires, or poisoning water wells – that could indiscriminately kill the innocent – as offenses of hiraba. Furthermore, hijacking methods of transportation or crucifying people in order to spread fear are also crimes of hiraba. Importantly, Islamic law strictly prohibited the taking of hostages, the mutilation of corpses, and torture".

According to When Religion Becomes Evil, by Baptist minister Charles Kimball, "There is only one verse in the Qur'an that contains a phrase related to suicide" (4:29). "O you who have believed, do not consume one another's wealth unjustly but only [in lawful] business by mutual consent. And do not kill yourselves. Indeed, Allah is to you ever Merciful".

Some commentators posit that "do not kill yourselves" is better translated "do not kill each other", and some translations, such as those by M. H. Shakir, reflect that view. Mainstream Islamic groups such as the European Council for Fatwa and Research also cite the Quranic verse Al-An'am 6:151) as prohibiting suicide: "And take not life, which Allah has made sacred, except by way of justice and law". The Hadith, including Bukhari 2:445, states: "The Prophet said, '...whoever commits suicide with a piece of iron will be punished with the same piece of iron in the Hell Fire', [and] 'A man was inflicted with wounds and he committed suicide, and so Allah said: 'My slave has caused death on himself hurriedly, so I forbid Paradise for him'".

Other Muslims have also noted Quranic verses in opposition to suicide, to taking of life other than by way of justice such as the death penalty for murder, and to collective punishment.

The international community considers the use of indiscriminate attacks on civilian populations as illegal under international law.

===== From Muslims in Muslim-minority countries =====
There are also objections from Muslim minority countries. Israel – a Jewish state with a Muslim minority – has also glorified militant martyrdom in educational materials and political propaganda, particularly Likud, the political successor organisation to two Zionist militant groups (Menachem Begin's Irgun and Yitzhak Shamir's Lehi). In 2010 Likud introduced a new study unit to the school curriculum that focused on martyred militants from these groups, including two who intentionally killed themselves with explosives. The most passionate objections to this glorification of terrorist martyrdom came from two Muslim Knesset members, Ahmed Tibi and Talab El-Sana, both from the Islmist faction United Arab List-Ta'a. Some Jewish members also objected, including by comparing Netanyahu to Hamas.

Ihsanic Intelligence, a London-based Islamic think-tank, published their two-year study into suicide bombings in the name of Islam titled The Hijacked Caravan. The study concluded that, "The technique of suicide bombing is anathema, antithetical and abhorrent to Sunni Islam. It is considered legally forbidden, constituting a reprehensible innovation in the Islamic tradition, morally an enormity of sin combining suicide and murder and theologically an act which has consequences of eternal damnation".

== See also ==
- 7 July 2005 London bombings – Islamist suicide terrorist attacks
- 2010 Austin plane crash – Suicide by pilot in Austin, Texas
- Islamophobic trope § 72 virgins
- 2018 Austin bombings – Series of consecutive bombings in Austin, Texas, US
- Explosive belt – Explosive device that an individual wears
- Fieseler Fi 103R Reichenberg – German World War II attack aircraft
- Heather Penney – United States Air Force officer (born 1974)
- Jauhar – Rajput wartime practice involving self-immolation
- Japanese Special Attack Units – Japanese military units during World War II
- Kamikaze – 1944–1945 Japanese suicidal aircraft attacks
- Martyr – Person who suffers persecution and death for their faith
- Martyrdom video – Intentional recording of suicide attack
- Martyrdom in Islam – Arabic term for martyrdom as used in Islamic theology
- Martyrdom in Palestinian society
- Murder–suicide – Committing murder and suicide
- Olei Hagardom – Twelve members of Zionist paramilitary organizations executed by the British
- Palestinian suicide attacks – Suicide bombings by Palestinian groups in the Israeli–Palestinian conflict
- Suicide Killers – 2006 documentary film on psychology of suicide bombers
- Use of child suicide bombers by Palestinian militant groups – Child exploitation by Palestinian militant groups
