= Istishhad =

Arabic term for martyrdom as used in Islamic theology

Istishhad (Arabic: استشهاد, romanized: istišhād, approximate pronunciation: Ees-Teesh-Had) is the Arabic word for "martyrdom", "death of a martyr", or (in some contexts) "heroic death". Martyrs are given the honorific shaheed. (Note: Named in honour of the martyr (shaheed) Benazir Bhutto, after she was assassinated by a suicide bomber in 2007: District: Shaheed Benazirabad District and Division in Sindh; Universities and colleges: Mohtarma Benazir Bhutto Shaheed Medical College; Shaheed Benazir Bhutto Women University; Shaheed Mohtarma Benazir Bhutto Medical University; Shaheed Benazir Bhutto Medical College; Shaheed Benazir Bhutto City University in Karachi, Sindh; Shaheed Benazir Bhutto Dewan University in Karachi, Sindh; Shaheed Benazir Bhutto University (Shaheed Benazirabad) in Nawabshah, Sindh; Shaheed Benazir Bhutto University of Veterinary & Animal Sciences in Sakrand, Sindh; Benazir Bhutto Shaheed University (Karachi) in Karachi, Sindh; Shaheed Benazir Bhutto University (Sheringal) in Dir, Khyber Pakhtunkhwa.; Shaheed Benazir Bhutto Women University (previously known as the Frontier Women University, in Peshawar, Khyber Pakhtunkhwa); All pages beginning with: Shaheed Benazir…; Benazir Bhutto Shaheed…; Shaheed Mohtarma Benazir…; Mohtarma Benazir Bhutto Shaheed…) The word derives from the Semitic root shahida (Arabic: شهد), meaning "to witness". Traditionally martyrdom has an exalted place in Islam. (Note: For example Shi'i cleric Sa'id Akhtar Rizvi quotes Quranic verses Q3:169-171: And reckon not those who are killed in Allah's way as dead; nay, they are alive (and) are provided sustenance from their Lord; rejoicing in what Allah has given them out of His grace, and they rejoice for the sake of those who, (being left) behind them, have not yet joined them, that they shall have no fear, nor shall they grieve. They rejoice on account of favour from Allah and (His) grace, and that Allah will not waste the reward of believers.; and interprets it to mean that "the moment a believer is slain in the way of Allah, his eternal life begins".) It is widely believed among Muslims that the sins of believers who "die in the way of God" will be forgiven by Allah. Shia views on martyrdom have been profoundly influenced by internal Muslim conflicts, notably Husayn ibn Ali's martyrdom at Karbala in 680, shaping it as a central belief and practice.

In the late 20th and early 21st centuries, the term istishhad has been redefined by Jihadists to emphasize the "heroism" of sacrifice, rather than portraying it as an act of victimization. This concept has evolved into a military and political strategy known among Jihadist groups as "martyrdom operations". although Western media commonly refer to them as suicide attacks. These acts contain "a central ideological pillar and organizational ideal" of waging "active jihad against the perceived enemies of Islam". Sunni Islamist figures such as Hassan Al-Banna viewed martyrdom as a duty incumbent upon every Muslim, urging them to ready themselves for it and to excel in the "art of death". Contemporary Shi'ite perspectives on martyrdom have commonly followed similar paths.

The rise of deaths of Muslims in conflicts spanning regions such as Palestine, Afghanistan, Kashmir, Chechnya, Iraq, and Iran has been accompanied by extensive literature glorifying these martyrs' actions. Jihadist terror groups, in particular Al-Qaeda, have "employed innovative modes of action and raised suicide terrorism's level of destruction and fatalities to previously unknown heights". Osama bin Laden referred to Muslims who had been massacred in numerous conflicts as evidence that the world regarded Muslims lives as "cheap" in his "declaration of war" on the United States in 1996.

== Importance ==
=== Significance in afterlife ===
Quranic verses 3:169-171 is said to indicate that the sins of believers who "die in the way of God" will be forgiven by Allah, and transported to paradise, without having to wait for Judgement Day like other believers.

And reckon not those who are killed in Allah's way as dead; nay, they are alive (and) are provided sustenance from their Lord; rejoicing in what Allah has given them out of His grace, and they rejoice for the sake of those who, (being left) behind them, have not yet joined them, that they shall have no fear, nor shall they grieve. They rejoice on account of favour from Allah and (His) grace, and that Allah will not waste the reward of believers. (Q.3:169-171)

=== Social and psychological impact ===
The cultural reverence for martyrs does not mean that there is no grief in families whose loved one has been martyred. A psychological research study interviewed surviving widows and children of men who were killed by terrorist Baruch Goldstein who carried out a mass shooting at the mosque in Hebron where the men were praying on 25 February 1994. The researchers found that half of the daughters interview and a substantial proportion of their wives and sons had clinically measurable symptoms of PTSD. They concluded that traumatic bereavement still occurs in societies with religious admiration of dead martyrs.

=== Scripture ===
A martyr is considered one whose place in Paradise is promised according to these verses in the Quran:

Think not of those who are slain in Allah's way as dead. Nay, they live, finding their sustenance in the presence of their Lord; They rejoice in the bounty provided by Allah. And with regard to those left behind, who have not yet joined them (in their bliss), the (Martyrs) glory in the fact that on them is no fear, nor have they (cause to) grieve.

— Quran 3:169–170.

There are at least five different kinds of martyrs according to the following hadith:

Allah's Apostle said, "Five are regarded as martyrs: They are those who die because of plague, abdominal disease, drowning or a falling building etc., and the martyrs in Allah's cause."

— Collected by Muhammad al-Bukhari, Sahih al-Bukhari.

=== Shia Muslims ===
Shia often refer to the martyrdom of Hussain ibn Ali and his companions and family members in the Battle of Karbala as role models and inspiration for martyrdom as a glorious and noble death.

Vali Nasr alleged that, "Many nights during the war, Iranian soldiers would wake up to see a white-shrouded figure on a white horse blessing them. These apparitions of the Twelfth Imam were professional actors sent to boost morale. The common soldiers, often peasant boys raised in an atmosphere of simple piety, would then carry the tale to their relatives and friends in the villages and small towns they called home, if they lived to make it home".

== Victims of terrorist attacks and assassinations ==
Progressive and conservative Muslims both refer to victims of terrorism as martyrs. The term often overlaps with secular patriotic concepts of dying for one's country.

=== Attacks on mosques ===
Victims of terrorist attacks are regarded as martyrs, particularly attacks on mosques, because this means Muslims have been targeted for their faith or died while performing religious duties such as prayers.

==== 1994 Hebron massacre ====
One of the most influential attacks on a mosque was the 1994 Hebron massacre.

==== Christchurch mosque massacre ====
The people killed in the Christchurch mosque massacre are commonly referred to as "Shaheeds" or "Shuhada" (martyrs) by their surviving relatives and other Muslims paying them respect and honouring their memory. (Note: Using the English plural "Shaheeds" or Arabic plural "Shuhada" of the Arabic word "Shaheed") Widows of Shuhada (widows of martyrs) was the name of a Radio New Zealand (RNZ) documentary series. The series told the stories of the widows and children of four martyred men. The men were four of the 51 people killed by an Australian terrorist in the mass shootings on 15 March 2019 at the Al-Noor mosque in the Linwood suburb of Christchurch, New Zealand.

=== Assassinations and bystanders ===
Muslims from a very wide variety of cultures, sects, and political ideologies regard people who are assassinated or executed as martyrs. This often overlaps with nationalism and other secular concepts of martyrdom about dying serving one's country or dying in the service of other secular ideals.

Indian lawyer Shahid Azmi is occasionally referred to as "Shaheed Shahid Azmi" (the Martyr Shahid Azmi) (Note: His name is Shahid, and the word for martyr is spelled "Shaheed" in Indian English and by most Muslims who use the word in English. The word Shaheed is gendered in Arabic and the feminine form is Shaheeda, but the loanword is not gendered in English or other Indo-European languages.) because he was assassinated, or "Shaheed Advocate Shahid Azmi" (the martyred advocate), adding a title used to describe his role as a defence lawyer. Azmi defended young Muslims in India who had been wrongly accused of terrorism. Muslims are a persecuted minority in India where Hindutva and other Hindu nationalism are increasingly dominant ideologies. Azmi was 32 years old when he died. Reports that describe his death as martyrdom (Urdu: شاہد اعظمی کی شہادت, romanized: Shahid Azmi ki shahadat, lit. 'Martyrdom of Shahid Azmi') say he sacrificed his life for truth and justice.

A particularly notable example of a progressive Muslim who was assassinated by terrorists is Benazir Bhutto, leader of the progressive left wing Pakistan People's Party, and former Prime Minister of Pakistan. She was assassinated in 2007 by a teenage extremist, who is thought to be connected to the Tehrik-i-Taliban Pakistan. Many things in Pakistan, were named or renamed in her honour, referring to her by the title "shaheed" (martyr). Most of them related to education, particularly women's education, but there were also others, including Shaheed Benazirabad District (Sindhi: شهيد بينظيرآباد ضلعو, romanized: Shaheed Benazirabad Zilao, Urdu: ضلع شہید بینظیر آباد, romanized: Zila Shaheed Benazirabad) in the province of Sindh. The district, previously known as Nawabshah District, was renamed in September 2008 when members of the Provincial Assembly of Sindh from Nawabshah lobbied for the district be renamed in her honour. Benazir's father and political predecessor, Zulfikar Ali Bhutto, was executed by a military dictator and is also memorialized as a martyr. (Note: such as in the names of memorialised, Shaheed Zulfiqar Ali Bhutto Medical University, and Shaheed Zulfiqar Ali Bhutto University of Law.)

Conservative Muslims also refer to assassinated leaders as martyrs. For example, Ismail Haniyeh – the civilian political leader of the Islamic Resistance Movement (Hamas) – was assassinated by a bomb secretly planted in the bedroom where he slept while visiting Iran, killing Haniyeh and his bodyguard. The office of the Turkish president referred to Haniyeh's death as "his martyrdom" (in English). Palestinian sources in English also referred to Haniyeh as a "martyr" and referred to his death as "martyrdom" (in English). The same words were used in a translation of a statement by Hamas was published by Al-Jazeera English.

"In the name of God, the Most Gracious, the Most Merciful. [And do not think that those who are killed in the way of God are dead. Rather, they are alive with their Lord, receiving provision.] The Islamic Resistance Movement Hamas mourns our great Palestinian people, the Arab and Islamic nation, and all the free people of the world: brother, leader, martyr, Mujahid Ismail Haniyeh. … To God we belong and to Him we shall return. And it is a struggle, victory or martyrdom."

— The Islamic Resistance Movement (Hamas), translated statement published by Al-Jazeera English, (31 July 2024).

=== Suicide attacks on security forces ===
Members of the military and security forces who are killed by enemy suicide bombers are seen as martyrs. When an ISIS suicide bomber blew himself up at Rafah crossing in 2017, the border guard who was killed attempting to stop the bomber crossing into Egypt, a member of Hamas' Qassam Brigades, was described as a "martyr" in English and "shaheed" in Arabic (Arabic: الشهيد نضال الجعفري, romanized: al-Shaheed Nidal al-Jaafari) and his death was described as martyrdom (Arabic: استشهاد نضال جمعة, romanized: Istishhad Nidal Jaafari, lit. 'Martyrdom of Nidal Jaafari'). This language was used by Palestinian media, some international media, and even the bomber's family. The bomber's family condemned him publicly, describing his actions as unpatriotic and criminal, and announced they would not be holding funeral services for him. Media referred to the bomber as a suicide bomber (Arabic: فجر انتحاري) and not a martyr. Gaza's clans referred to the bombing as an act of suicide terrorism (Arabic: العمل الإرهابي الانتحاري).

== Dying in battle and casualties of war ==
=== Nationalist and patriotic ideas of martyrdom ===
In militaries of Muslim majority nations, concepts and terminology of religious martyrdom overlap with more secular nationalist ideals of dying for one's country.

=== Martyrdom in Afghanistan ===
According to the English language website of Ariana News, Zabiullah Mujahid, deputy minister of information and culture and spokesperson of the Government of Afghanistan announced the formation of an Istishhad battalion, which will be part of the Armed Forces of the Islamic Emirate of Afghanistan special forces.

=== Martyrdom in Iran ===
==== Ruhollah Khomeini's views on martyrdom ====
"Imam" Ruhollah Khomeini, leader of the Iranian Revolution, not only praised the large numbers of young Shia Iranians who became "shahids" during the Iran–Iraq War but asserted the war was "God's hidden gift", or as one scholar of Khomeini put it, "a vital outlet through which Iran's young martyrs experienced mystical transcendence". Khomeini explained:

"If the great martyr (Imam Husayn ibn Ali) ... confined himself to praying ... the great tragedy of Kabala would not have come about ... Among the contemporary ulema, if the great Ayatollah ... Shirazi ... thought like these people [who do not fight for Islam], a war would not have taken place in Iraq ... all those Muslims would not have been martyred."

Death might seem like a tragedy to some but in reality...

If you have any tie or link binding you to this world in love, try to sever it. This world, despite all its apparent splendor and charm, is too worthless to be loved.

Khomeini never wavered from his faith in the war as God's will, and observers (such as Ayatollah Mehdi Haeri Yazdi, a grand ayatollah and former student with family ties to Khomeini) have related a number of examples of his impatience with those who tried to convince him to negotiate an end to the war even when it had become a stalemate with hundreds of thousands killed and civilian areas being attacked by missiles.

Some scholars (Ervand Abrahamian) argue that the idea of martyrdom was transform by Khomeini from the traditional Shi'i belief (Note: and even from Khomeini's own belief prior to the late 1960s,) of "a saintly act", usually referring "the famous Shi'i saints (Note: such as the "Five Martyrs") who in obeying God's will, had gone to their deaths"; to "revolutionary sacrifice" done "to overthrow a despotic political order"; and that Khoemini was heavily influenced by Iranian leftists individuals and groups active in the 1960s such as Ali Shariati, the Tudeh Party, Mojahedin, Hojjat al-Islam Nimatollah Salahi-Najafabadi.

=== Willingness to die in battle ===
==== Southeast Asia before the Cold War ====
During the colonial era and up to World War II, Muslims in Aceh and Moro, now part of Indonesia and the Philippines, attacked much more powerful opponents – principally the Dutch, the Japanese, and the Americans – despite near certain death.

==== Acehnese attacks on the Dutch ====
Acehnese Muslims from the Aceh Sultanate carried out suicidal attacks known as Parang-sabil against Dutch invaders during the Aceh War. It was considered as part of personal jihad in the Islamic religion of the Acehnese. The Dutch called it Atjèh-moord, which literally translates to Aceh murder. The Indonesian translations of the Dutch terms are Aceh bodoh (Aceh pungo) or Aceh gila (Aceh mord). The Acehnese work of literature, the Hikayat Perang Sabil provided the background and reasoning for the "Aceh-mord" – Acehnese suicidal attacks upon the Dutch. These poetic tales have been used to explain Archenese women and children killed in battle by the Dutch, including 700 Acehnese women and children killed in 1904.

==== Japanese occupation of Aceh ====
Atjèh-moord was also used against the Japanese by the Acehnese during the Japanese occupation of Aceh. The Acehnese Ulama (Islamic clerics) fought against both the Dutch and the Japanese, revolting against the Dutch in February 1942 and against Japan in November 1942. The revolt was led by the All-Aceh Religious Scholars' Association (PUSA). The Japanese suffered 18 dead in the uprising while they slaughtered up to 100 or over 120 Acehnese. The revolt happened in Bayu and was centred around Tjot Plieng village's religious school. During the revolt, the Japanese troops armed with mortars and machine guns were charged by sword wielding Acehnese under Teungku Abduldjalil (Tengku Abdul Djalil) in Buloh Gampong Teungah and Tjot Plieng on 10 and 13 November. In May 1945 the Acehnese rebelled again.

==== Hikayat Perang Sabil ====
The original Jawi script Acehnese language work Hikayat Perang Sabil has been transliterated into the Latin alphabet and annotated by Ibrahim Alfian (Teuku.) published in Jakarta.

Perang sabi was the Acehnese word for jihad, a holy war and Acehnese language literary works on perang sabi were distributed by Islamic clerics ('ulama) such as Teungku di Tiro to help the resistance against the Dutch in the Aceh War. The recompense awarded by in paradise detailed in Islamic Arabic texts and Dutch atrocities were expounded on in the Hikayat Perang Sabil which was communally read by small cabals of Ulama and Acehnese who swore an oath before going to achieve the desired status of "martyr" by launching suicide attacks on the Dutch. Perang sabil was the Malay equivalent to other terms like Jihad, Ghazawat for "Holy war", the text was also spelled "Hikayat perang sabil". Fiction novels like Sayf Muhammad Isa's Sabil: Prahara di Bumi Rencong on the war by Aceh against the Dutch include references ro Hikayat Perang Sabil. Mualimbunsu Syam Muhammad wrote the work called "Motives for Perang Sabil in Nusantara", Motivasi perang sabil di Nusantara: kajian kitab Ramalan Joyoboyo, Dalailul-Khairat, dan Hikayat Perang Sabil on Indonesia's history of Islamic holy war (Jihad). According to Braithwaite and Braithwaite, children and women were inspired to do suicide attacks by the Hikayat Perang Sabil against the Dutch. Hikayat Perang Sabil is also known as "Hikayat Prang Sabi". Hikayat Perang Sabil is considered as part of 19th century Malay literature. In Dutch occupied Aceh, Hikayat Perang Sabil was confiscated from Sabi's house during a Police raid on 27 September 1917. This literary work has been used to explain Archenese women and children killed in battle by the Dutch, 700 of whom were killed 1904 alone.

==== Against the Spanish in the Philippines ====
Juramentado, in Philippine history, refers to a male Moro swordsman (from the Tausug tribe of Sulu) who attacked and killed targeted occupying and invading police and soldiers. Death was expected, and considered martyrdom, undertaken as a form of jihad. In the Philippines the Moro people are reported to have engaged in suicide attacks against enemies as early as the 16th century. Those who performed suicide attacks were called mag-sabil, and the suicide attacks were known as Parang-sabil. The Spanish called them juramentado. The idea of the juramentado was considered part of jihad in the Moros' Islamic religion. During an attack, a Juramentado would throw himself at his targets and kill them with bladed weapons such as barongs and kris until he himself was killed. The Moros performed juramentado suicide attacks against the Spanish in the Spanish–Moro conflict of the 16th to the 19th centuries, against the Americans in the Moro Rebellion (1899–1913), and against the Japanese in World War II. The Moro Juramentados aimed their attacks specifically against their enemies, and not against non-Muslims in general. They launched suicide attacks on the Japanese, Spanish, Americans and Filipinos, but did not attack the non-Muslim Chinese as the Chinese were not considered enemies of the Moro people. The Japanese responded to these suicide attacks by massacring all the relatives of the attacker.

== Suicide bombings ==
=== Significance of martyrdom to suicide attacks ===
In the late 20th and early 21st centuries, the term istishhad has been said to have "developed ... into a military and political strategy", and often be translated as "martyrdom operations". The concept has also been described (by Yoram Schweitzer and Sari Goldstein Ferber) "as a means of warfare" that is "part of an overall philosophy that sees active jihad against the perceived enemies of Islam as a central ideological pillar and organisational ideal". Jihadist terror groups, in particular Al-Qaeda, have "employed innovative modes of action and raised suicide terrorism's level of destruction and fatalities to previously unknown heights".

Supporters have also described martyrdom/suicide operations as a military "equalizer" whereby pious Muslim martyrs use their willingness to sacrifice for their faith and their certainty in their reward in the afterlife to counter the Western unbeliever, who has "at their disposal state-of-the-art and top-of-the-range means and weaponry to achieve their aims. [While] we have the minimum basics ... We ... do not seek material rewards, but heavenly one in the hereafter", Hassan, a Hezbollah fighter, quoted by Hala Jaber.

By the early twenty first century, martyrdom operations by Muslims had also been turned against other Muslims, usually from groups the attackers did not regard as Muslims. Thousands of Muslims, particularly Shia, had become victims, not just initiators, of martyrdom operations, with many civilians and even mosques and shrines being targeted, particularly in Iraq. According to Scott Atran, in 2004 in Iraq there were 400 suicide attacks and 2000 casualties. Salafi Jihadi ideologue Abu Musab Al-Zarqawi declared "all-out war" on Shia Muslims in Iraq in response to a US-Iraqi offensive on the town of Tal Afar. He described his view of the Sunni-Shia conflict in a February 2004 open letter to supporters where he argued for a cycle of attack and retaliation that would "awaken" those Sunnis who previously had not wanted a sectarian war to join his side. (Note: The "cunning" Shia planned to build a state "stretching from Iran through Iraq, Syria and Lebanon" to the Gulf kingdoms, but by attacking Shia in their "religious, political, and military depth" his jihadis would "drag" the Shia "into the arena of sectarian war", and leading them to "bare the teeth of the hidden rancor working in their breasts" and so "awaken the inattentive Sunnis as they feel imminent danger and annihilating death at the hands of theses Sabeans", i.e. Shia.)

In 2007, some of the Shia ulema have responded by declaring suicide bombing haram:

"حتي كساني كه با انتحار مي‌آيند و مي‌زنند عده‌اي را مي‌كشند، آن هم به عنوان عمليات انتحاري، اينها در قعر جهنم هستند"
"Even those who kill people with suicide bombing, these shall meet the flames of hell".

At least one scholar, Shi'i cleric Sa'id Akhtar Rizvi, writes that while normally when a human being dies, their afterlife "depends on one's faith and deeds", but that "the moment a believer is slain in the way of Allah, his eternal life begins". With a martyr there is no "uncertainty ... suspense. Allah immediately bestows on the martyr the joy, the everlasting bliss and an immortal life. ... Those whose faith in the Creator is superfluous, can never solve the mystery of martyrdom. They feel puzzled as to why the Muslims, the true believers, appear eager to die in the way of Allah. They call them 'suicide squad'. But it is not suicide. Suicide implies termination of life, while martyrdom is continuation of life".

==== Martyrdom operations ====
Militant groups term attacks in which the attacker causes their own death, such as by detonation of a bomb, as "martyrdom operations" instead of "suicide operations". The term is usually used by Muslim militants, although non-Muslim groups, such as the Liberation Tigers of Tamil Eelam, have also engaged in suicide attacks. Islamist militants prefer the term "martyrdom operation" to "suicide attack", as suicide is forbidden under classical Islamic law.

Acts of istishhad are governed by Islamic legal rules associated with armed warfare or military jihad. The rules governing jihad, literally meaning struggle but often called "holy war" by non-Muslims, are covered in exquisite detail in the classical texts of Islamic jurisprudence. In Orthodox Islamic law, jihad is a collective religious obligation on the Muslim community, when the community is endangered or Muslims are subjected to oppression and subjugation. The rules governing such conflicts include not killing women, children or non-combatants, and leaving cultivated or residential areas undamaged.

For more than a millennium, these tenets were accepted by Sunnis and Shiites; however, since the 1980s militant Islamists have challenged the traditional Islamic rules of warfare in an attempt to justify suicide attacks despite clear contradictions to established Islamic laws.

=== Earlier suicide attacks in other cultures ===
Overt suicide attacks, such as suicide bombings, were historically rare in the Western world, Middle East, and other regions where the dominant religion is one of the Abrahamic faiths. The religion and culture in these regions is dominated by Abrahamic religions – Islam, Christianity, and Judaism – which all prohibit suicide in most circumstances.

During the World Wars and interwar period organised use of suicide in combat was most common in East Asia, where Abrahamic religions are only practiced by a small minority of the population. particularly Imperial Japanese kamikaze attacks during world war two. Suicide bombings were used in China by the right-wing Nationalist government and their predecessors. In the Xinhai Revolution, "Dare to Die" student corps were founded to fight against Qing dynasty rule. Sun Yat-sen and Huang Xing promoted the National Revolutionary Army's Dare to Die Corps. Dare to Die squads frequently wielded traditional weapons such as swords in suicidal attacks against overwhelming odds. They also used suicide bombings, strapping explosives to themselves to attack Imperial Japanese invaders during the Second Sino-Japanese War (1937–1945) and broader the Second World War (1939–1945). In one such attack Chinese soldiers killed themselves and destroyed four Japanese tanks. During the 1937 Defense of Sihang Warehouse, a Chinese soldier reportedly detonated a grenade vest, killing 20 Japanese troops. At the 1937 Battle of Shanghai, a suicide bomber halted a tank column by detonating himself beneath the lead vehicle. During the 1938 Battle of Taierzhuang, Chinese suicide troops again charged at tanks with explosives strapped to their bodies.

Before the sudden resurgence in suicide bombings, the 1972 Lod Airport massacre – by the Japanese Red Army (JRA) at an Israeli airport – was one of the only suicide attacks in the Middle East. It was one of only examples of political violence in the region where a militant killed himself. It was carried of by Japanese foreign fighters from the JRA working with the Christian-led secular PFLP. Some reports at the time labelled the 1972 Lod Airport massacre in Israel by the Japanese Red Army (JRA) a "Kamikaze" attack, but others have criticized the label, including the surviving attacker's interpreter All three militants intended to die, but one survived. In more recent reports call it a "suicide attack" or "suicide mission", even when referring to the attacker who survived. The survivor confessed and hoped to be quickly executed. He was assigned the same lawyer as Dov Gruner, who has seemingly done the same.

==== Christian and Jewish militants and militaries ====
Various state and non-state armed groups from Christian and Jewish cultures have sporadically used planned suicide or lethal self-harm, such as hunger-strikes, as part of warfare or political violence. Western militaries have occasionally provided suicide pills for their people to use if they are captured. British soldier and radar expert Jack Nissenthall survived his mission in the Dieppe Raid but was given a cyanide capsule to use if captured.

=== Alleged predecessors in Southeast Asia ===
During the colonial era and up to World War II, Muslims in Aceh and Moro, now part of Indonesia and the Philippines, attacked much more powerful opponents – principally the Dutch, the Japanese, and the Americans – despite near certain death. Some authors have characterised these as predecessors of modern suicide bombings. Other sources say that suicide bombings in places like the Philippines arrose only recently, due to foreign influence from international cultists such as ISIS.

=== After the Iranian Islamic Revolution ===
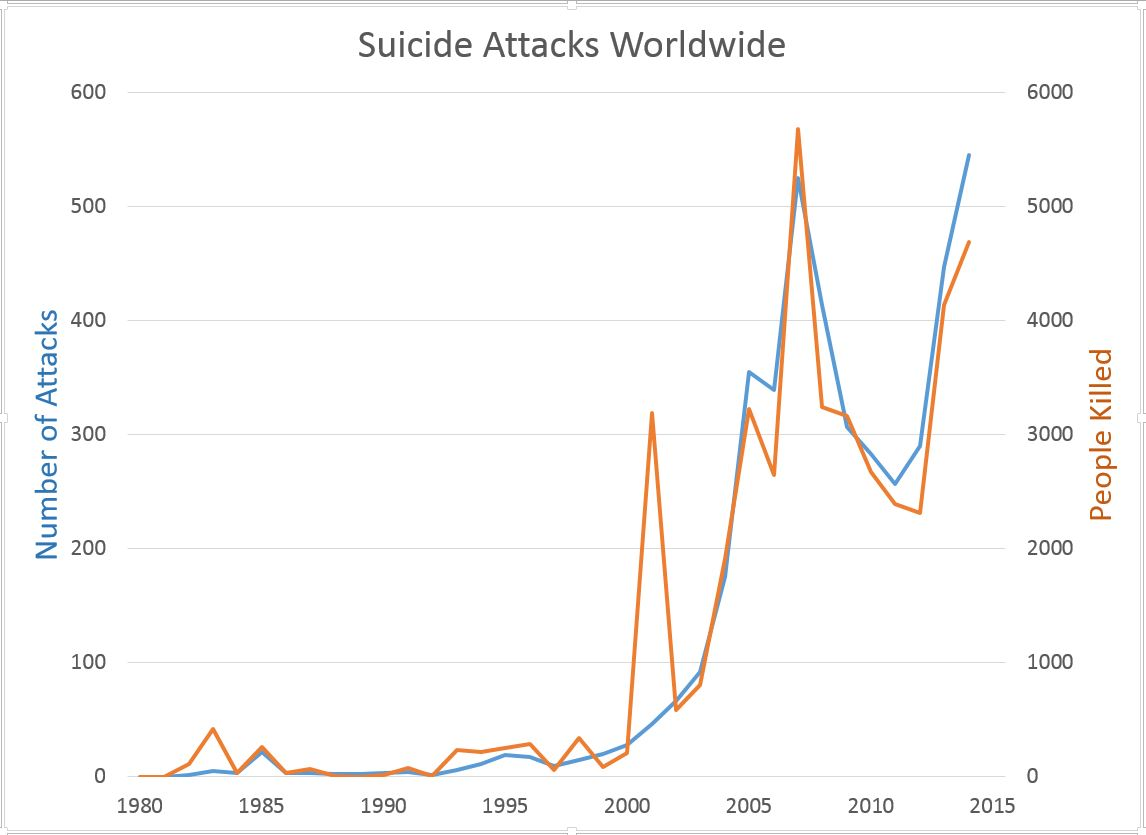
The number of suicide attacks grew enormously after the year 2000.

In the late 20th and early 21st centuries, the quantity and "innovation" of Istishhad used against civilian and military targets has raised its level of "destruction and fatalities to previously unknown heights", by one estimate totaling 3,699 suicide attacks in 40+ countries from 1982 to 2013. This began in the 1980s with Shia revolutionaries in Iran fighting off Iraqi Baathist invaders, and Hezbollah's successful expulsion of Western peacekeepers and Israeli's from Lebanon. and spread to Al-Qaeda and other Sunni groups.

==== Iran-Iraq War ====
Scholars believe the origins of suicide attacks by Muslims were in the late 20th and early 21st centuries lie among the Shia of the newly formed Islamic Republic of Iran following the invasion by Iraq in 1980. Vali Nasr writes that necessity may have been a motivation for use of suicidal or suicide attacks in the form of "hundreds of thousands of volunteers" attacking Iraqi lines, and being killed by the Iraqis. At least early on in the war, many of the "most seasoned officers" in Iran's military had been purged, while the hostage crisis "left Iran internationally isolated", so that "conventional means of repelling the Iraqi invasion were hard to come by".

Mohammed Hossein Fahmideh, a 13-year-old Iranian boy who fought in Iran–Iraq War, is said – by former CIA operative Robert Baer – to be the first Muslim to have participated in such an attack in contemporary history. He strapped rocket-propelled grenades to his chest and blew himself up under an Iraqi tank in November 1980. Ayatollah Khomeini declared Fahmideh a national hero. According to Baer, the boy was used as an inspiration for further volunteers for martyrdom. A near identical tactic was used by Chinese Nationalists in the 1930s and 1940s (see above). The Iranian website, Tebyan Cultural Institute refers to the child's death simply as "killing himself", making no mention of either "suicide" or "martyrdom". According to Former CIA officer Robert Baer, "Ayatollah Khomeini's embattled Islamic republic adopted Fahmideh as a national hero and as an inspiration for further bloodshed and martyrdom".

Iranian basij volunteers ran through minefields to detonate buried landmines and clear a safe battlefield path for following soldiers.

==== Khomeini's encouragement of self-inflicted martyrdom ====
"Imam" Ruhollah Khomeini, leader of the Iranian Revolution, is thought to have given a broader definition of martyrdom to include istishhad/"self-martyrdom". He believed martyrdom could come not only from "inadvertent" death but "deliberate" as well. While martyrdom has always been celebrated in Islam and martyrs promised a place in heaven, (Q3:169–171), the idea that opportunities for martyrdom were important has not always been so common.

==== Hezbollah ====
While martyrdom operations did not lead to victory over Iraq, in Lebanon, Hezbollah, the Shia party/militia funded and assisted by Iran, was enormously successful in its attacks. The group drove Israel out of South Lebanon, killing approximately 600 Israeli soldiers in Southern Lebanon between 1982 and 1984, (a relatively large number for a small country like Israel). This "rare victory" over Israel "lionized" the group among Arabs in the region and added to "the aura of Shia power still glimmering amid the afterglow of the Iranian revolution." It also drove Western peacekeepers out of Lebanon, killing 243 U.S. Marines and 58 French troops in suicide attacks; blew up the American embassy in 1983, killing the Middle East experts in the CIA, and then several months later blew up the annex the survivors of the US embassy had retreated to.

==== Spread to Sunni Muslims ====
The victory of Hezbollah is known to have inspired Hamas in Palestine, and al-Qaeda in its worldwide bombing campaign. Writing in 2006, Vali Nasr states that "until fairly recently" willingness to die for the cause" (with suicide bombing or other means) was seen as a "predominantly Shia phenomenon, tied to the myths of Karbala and the Twelfth Imam".

Inspired by the success of Hezbollah, the (Sunni) Palestinian nationalist group Hamas used suicide attacks intermittently in occupied Palestine. Hamas first carried out suicide attacks – involved strapping the body of the mission carrier with explosives – in the Israeli towns of Afula and Khidara in the spring of 1994, it "described these operations as `amaliyat istishhadiya (martyrdom operations)" rather than the more secular a'maliyat fida'iyah (self-sacrifice operations). According to Palestinian anthropologist Nasser Abufarha, istishhadi did not previously exist in the Arabic dictionary. Istishhadi is different from the notions of shahid or fida'i in that istishhadi is the idea of proactively seeking martyrdom; an idea that is not traditionally Islamic. Hamas introduced the term istishhadi with the aim of attaching religion to self-sacrifice because Hamas believes Islam is "the most solid ideology through which to achieve the goals of the Palestinian national struggle." The term 'amaliyat istishhadiya has caught on and "today, istishhad is the most frequently used term to refer to acts of sacrifice in the Palestinian resistance and is used by Islamic, secular, and Marxist groups alike".

According to U.S. American legal scholar, Noah Feldman: "The vocabulary of martyrdom and sacrifice, the formal videotaped pre-confession of faith, the technological tinkering to increase deadliness—all are now instantly recognizable to every Muslim." Feldman sees a worrying trend in the steady expansion of the targets of Istishhad since its debut in 1983 when successful bombing of barracks and embassy buildings drove the U.S. military out of Lebanon.

First the targets were American soldiers, then mostly Israelis, including women and children. From Lebanon and Israel, the technique of suicide bombing moved to Iraq, where the targets have included mosques and shrines, and the intended victims have mostly been Shiite Iraqis. The newest testing ground is Afghanistan, where both the perpetrators and the targets are orthodox Sunni Muslims. Not long ago, a bombing in Lashkar Gah, the capital of Helmand Province, killed Muslims, including women, who were applying to go on pilgrimage to Mecca. Overall, the trend is definitively in the direction of Muslim-on-Muslim violence. By a conservative accounting, more than three times as many Iraqis have been killed by suicide bombings in the last 3 years as have Israelis in the last 10. Suicide bombing has become the archetype of Muslim violence—not just to frightened Westerners but also to Muslims themselves.

The Chicago Project on Security and Terrorism recorded a total of 3,699 suicide attacks in over 40 countries from 1982 to 2013.

=== Religious-scholarly debate about suicide missions ===
Some Western and Muslim scholars of Islam find suicide attacks to be a clear violation of classical Islamic law.

==== Against suicide attacks ====
Suicide bombings as acts of terrorism have spurred some Muslims to provide scholastic refutations of suicide bombings and to condemn them. For example, Ihsanic Intelligence, a London-based Islamic think tank, published a study on suicide bombings that concluded, "suicide bombing is anathema, antithetical and abhorrent to Sunni Islam. It is considered legally forbidden, constituting a reprehensible innovation in the Islamic tradition, morally an enormity of sin combining suicide and murder and theologically an act which has consequences of eternal damnation".

Oxford-based Malaysian jurist Shaykh Afifi al-Akiti, issued his fatwa forbidding suicide bombing and targeting innocent civilians:

"If the attack involves a bomb placed on the body or placed so close to the bomber that when the bomber detonates it the bomber is certain [yaqin] to die, then the More Correct Position according to us is that it does constitute suicide. This is because the bomber, being also the Maqtul [the one killed], is unquestionably the same Qatil [the immediate/active agent that kills] = Qatil Nafsahu [killing oneself, i.e., suicide]". (Note: A distinction can be made in religion between suicidal or high risk attacks, such as the Lod Airport massacre or "reckless charge in battle", "violent actions perpetrated by people who are aware that the odds they will return alive are close to zero" (Ami Pedahzur); and suicide attacks whose success depends on the attacker killing themselves. the first may be acceptable as martyrdom, and the second condemned as suicide. However, in the example given, the Lod Airport massacre, the attack was planned as a triple suicide attack, and one attacker killed himself with a hand grenade during the attack. The only survivor sought the death penalty for himself, albeit unsuccessfully.)

In January 2006, a Shia Marja' cleric, Ayatollah al-Udhma Yousof al-Sanei decreed a fatwa against suicide bombing declaring it as a "terrorist act" and the Saudi grand mufti as well as other Sunni scholars similarly denounced suicide attacks regardless of their offensive or defensive characterization.

Scholar Bernard Lewis states, "At no time did the classical jurists offer any approval or legitimacy to what we nowadays call terrorism. Nor indeed is there any evidence of the use of terrorism as it is practiced nowadays". Similarly, Noah Feldman writes that the Islamic reasoning of suicide attackers is not convincing as martyrdom in Islam typically refers to another person killing a Muslim warrior, not the warrior pushing "the button himself". In addition, "The killing of women and children has proved harder to explain away as a permissible exercise of jihad." This "illustrates the nature of the difficulty of reconciling suicide bombing with Islamic law".

As Charles Kimball, the University of Oklahoma's Director of Religious Studies, pointed out that Islam "clearly prohibits suicide" by citing "the hadith materials, which are the authoritative sayings and actions of the prophet, Muhammad, includes many unambiguous statements about suicide: one who 'throws himself off a mountain' or 'drinks poison' or 'kills himself with a sharp instrument' will be in the fire of Hell. Suicide is not allowed even to those in extreme conditions such as painful illness or a serious wound". Other Islamic groups such as the European Council for Fatwa and Research cite the Quran'ic verse Al-An'am 6:151 as a prohibition against suicide: "And take not life, which Allah has made sacred, except by way of justice and law". Dr. Hassan Ali El-Najjar says that the hadith unambiguously forbid suicide.

Suicide tactics are controversial even within groups that use them.

==== Proponents of suicide operations ====
All Abrahamic religions forbid suicide. Suicide and suicide attempts have been decriminalised in most of the western world, but remain criminalised in some countries, such as Afghanistan, Palestine, and others.

An eclectic assortment of militant movements who self-Identify as Islamic (such as Hamas, Palestinian Islamic Jihad, Al-Qaeda, and ISIS) argue that suicide operations are justified according to Islamic law. This includes groups thar consider each other to be "devient ideologies" (the way Hamas describe ISIS and their sympathizers) or even outright non-Muslim (Arabic: كافر, romanized: kafir). Irshad Manji, author of The Trouble with Islam Today, in her retelling of a conversation with a leader of Islamic Jihad, she asked, "What's the difference between suicide, which the Koran condemns, and martyrdom?" She took his reply at face value, he said "Suicide, is done out of despair. But remember: most of our martyrs today were very successful in their earthly lives". She wrote, "In short, there was a future to live for—and they detonated it anyway".

Another rationale provided for why istishhad is not against Islamic law is that the civilians caught in the crossfire "were destined to die". The Saudi exile Muhammad al-Massari explains that any civilian killed in an attack on the enemy "won't suffer [but instead]...becomes a martyr himself". During the 2006 Israel-Hezbollah war, Hezbollah secretary-general Hassan Nasrallah apologized for an attack on Nazareth that killed two Israeli-Arab children—but said the two children should be considered "martyrs".

Further justifications have been given by Iranian cleric Ayatollah Mohammad Taghi Mesbah Yazdi, "when protecting Islam and the Muslim community depends on martyrdom operations, it not only is allowed, but even is an obligation as many of the Shi'ah great scholars and Maraje', including Ayatullah Safi Golpayegani and Ayatullah Fazel Lankarani, have clearly announced in their fatwas". Ayatollah Ruhollah Khomeini of Iran showered those who performed martyrdom operations during the Iran–Iraq War and against Israel with accolades. Indeed, Sayyed Abbas al-Musawi, the second Secretary General of Hezbollah and student of Khomeini, created a supplication that became popular among the Hezbollah youths and fighters.

Other clerics have supported suicide attacks largely in connection with the Israeli–Palestinian conflict. Sunni cleric Yusuf al-Qaradawi has supported such attacks by Palestinians in perceived defense of their homeland as heroic and an act of resistance. Shiite Lebanese cleric Mohammad Hussein Fadlallah, the spiritual authority recognized by Hezbollah, is reported to have similar views.

After the 7 July 2005 London bombings, journalist Mona Eltahawy published an op-ed in the Washington Post noting the fact that there were "22 imams and scholars who met at London's largest mosque to condemn the bombings but who would not criticize all suicide attacks", such as Sayed Mohammed Musawi, the head of the World Islamic League, who said "there should be a clear distinction between the suicide bombing of those who are trying to defend themselves from occupiers, which is something different from those who kill civilians, which is a big crime". After the knighting of Salman Rushdie in June 2007, Pakistan's acting Minister of Religious Affairs Muhammad Ijaz-ul-Haq publicly justified and called for a suicide attack against him.

There have been conflicting reports about the stances of Sheikh Muhammad Sayyid Tantawy (who was then the Grand Imam of Al-Azhar- he is now deceased) and Sheikh Ahmed el-Tayeb (who was then the Grand Mufti of Egypt and is now the Grand Imam of Al-Azhar). Shortly after the September 11 attacks Sheikh Tantawy issued a statement opposing suicide attacks. However, a translation from Al Azhar website quotes him as supporting suicide attacks on Jews in Israel as part of the Palestinian struggle "to strike horror into the hearts of the enemies of Islam". Yet, in 2003 he was quoted again as saying "groups which carried out suicide bombings were the enemies of Islam", and that all suicide attacks were sinful including those against Israelis. His comments condemning all suicide attacks were echoed by Malaysian Prime Minister Mahathir Mohamad and Lebanese cleric Husam Qaraqirah.

According to the Middle East Media Research Institute an Iranian Islamic theologian whom they referred to as Mohammad-Bagher Heydari Kashani, said "We had 36,000 student martyrs [in the Iran-Iraq War], 7,070 of whom were under the age of 14. [...] "They were a source of pride for us, and we must thank God for them". He said children should aspire to be like the Martyr Qasem Soleimani, an Iranian military leader who was assassinated by the United States on 3 January 2020.

==== Public opinion on suicide attacks ====
In addition to the views of Muslim theologians, conflicting viewpoints are apparent among the public in Muslim-majority countries. As a reporter for The Guardian notes in an article written during the Second Intifada in August 2001, the Muslim world celebrates "martyr-bombers" as heroes defending the things held sacred. Polls in the Middle East in August 2001 showed that 75% of people had been in favor of martyr-bombings.

However, the Pew Research Center has found decreases in Muslim support for suicide attacks. In 2011 surveys, less than 15% of Pakistanis, Jordanians, Turks, and Indonesians thought that suicide bombings were sometimes/often justified. Approximately 28% of Egyptians and 35% of Lebanese felt that suicide bombings were sometimes/often justified. However, 68% of Palestinians reported that suicide attacks were sometimes/often justified. In 2013, Pew found that "clear majorities of Muslims oppose violence in the name of Islam"; 89% in Pakistan, 81% in Indonesia, 78% in Nigeria, and 77% in Tunisia said that "suicide bombings or other acts of violence that target civilians are never justified".

Militant groups like Hamas and the Palestinian Islamic Jihad consider martyrdom as the highest form of sacrifice for the Palestinian cause, leading to acts of terrorism, including suicide bombings. This ethos is widespread in educational materials, visual media, community events, ceremonies, and has influenced the indoctrination of children from a young age, impacting the psychological well-being of Palestinian children. Neighbouring Israel – a Jewish state with a Muslim minority – has also glorified militant martyrdom in educational materials and political propaganda, particularly Likud, the political successor organisation to two Zionist militant groups (Menachem Begin's Irgun and Yitzhak Shamir's Lehi). In 2010 Likud introduced a new study unit to the school curriculum that focused on martyred militants from these groups, including two who intentionally killed themselves with explosives. The most passionate objections to this glorification of terrorist martyrdom came from two Muslim Knesset members, Ahmed Tibi and Talab El-Sana, both from the Islmist faction United Arab List-Ta'a. Some Jewish members also objected, including by comparing Netanyahu to Hamas.

== Stereotypes and misconceptions ==
One of the most prevalent Islamophobic tropes is the distortion of the Islamic concept of martyrdom. The word "Shaheed" (Arabic: شهيد) or "Shahid" (Persian: شهید) has been adopted into some varieties of English from the Arabic word for martyr. (Note: "Shaheed" in Commonwealth English and among English speaking Muslims. "Shahid" in Israeli English, from Arabic via Modern Hebrew.: Arabic: شهيد, romanized: shaheed, lit. 'male martyr'.; Arabic: شهيدة, romanized: shaheeda, lit. 'female martyr'.; Modern Hebrew: שהיד, romanized: shahid (male singular).; Modern Hebrew: שהידה, romanized: shahida (female singular).) Among Muslims and in some other cultures the word retains a similar or broader meaning. Whereas, in some places where Muslims and non-Muslims are in conflict words derived from the Arabic "shaheed", or related to martyrdom in Islam, have been given strong negative meanings or have become an Islamophobic slur. The word "Shahid" has been recently adopted in Modern Hebrew and Israeli English (Hebrew: שהיד, romanized: Shahid), as a loanword from Palestinian Arabic) and according to Haaretz the word "Shahid" has become "synonymous" with "terrorist" among Hebrew speakers in Israel since the suicide bombings of the 1990s.

== Quotes from the Quran and hadith ==
=== Quran ===
A martyr is considered one whose place in Paradise is promised according to these verses in the Quran:

Think not of those who are slain in Allah's way as dead. Nay, they live, finding their sustenance in the presence of their Lord; They rejoice in the bounty provided by Allah. And with regard to those left behind, who have not yet joined them (in their bliss), the (Martyrs) glory in the fact that on them is no fear, nor have they (cause to) grieve.

— Quran 3:169–170

Allah hath purchased of the believers their persons and their goods; for theirs (in return) is the garden (of Paradise): they fight in His cause, and slay and are slain: a promise binding on Him in truth, through the Torah, the Gospel, and the Qur'an: and who is more faithful to his covenant than Allah? then rejoice in the bargain which ye have concluded: that is the achievement supreme.

— Quran 9:111

The Quranic passage that follows is the source of the concept of Muslim martyrs being promised Paradise:

Those who leave their homes in the cause of Allah, and are then slain or die,- On them will Allah bestow verily a goodly Provision: Truly Allah is He Who bestows the best provision. Verily He will admit them to a place with which they shall be well pleased: for Allah is All-Knowing, Most Forbearing.

— Quran 22:58–59

=== Hadith ===
There are at least five different kinds of martyrs according to hadith.

Allah's Apostle said, "Five are regarded as martyrs: They are those who die because of plague, abdominal disease, drowning or a falling building etc., and the martyrs in Allah's cause."

— Collected by Muhammad al-Bukhari, Sahih al-Bukhari.

The importance of faith is highlighted in the following hadith:

It has been narrated on the authority of Anas b. Malik that the Messenger of Allah (may peace be upon him) said: Who seeks martyrdom with sincerity shall get its reward, though he may not achieve it.

— Collected by Muslim ibn al-Hajjaj, "Sahih Muslim"

It is thus not the outcome that determines the placement in Heaven but rather the intention.

Nonetheless, Paradise for a shahid is a popular concept in the Islamic tradition according to Hadith, and the attainment of this title is honorific.

Muhammad is reported to have said these words about martyrdom:

By Him in Whose Hands my life is! I would love to be martyred in Allah's Cause and then get resurrected and then get martyred, and then get resurrected again and then get martyred and then get resurrected again and then get martyred.

— Collected by Muhammad al-Bukhari, Sahih al-Bukhari.

The Prophet said, "Nobody who enters Paradise likes to go back to the world even if he got everything on the Earth, except a Mujahid who wishes to return to the world so that he may be martyred ten times because of the dignity he receives (from Allah).

— Collected by Muhammad al-Bukhari, Sahih al-Bukhari.

Several hadith also indicate the nature of a shahid's life in Paradise. Shahids attain the highest level of Paradise, the Paradise of al-Firdous.

Haritha was martyred on the day (of the battle) of Badr, and he was a young boy then. His mother came to the Prophet and said, "O Allah's Apostle! You know how dear Haritha is to me. If he is in Paradise, I shall remain patient, and hope for reward from Allah, but if it is not so, then you shall see what I do?" He said, "May Allah be merciful to you! Have you lost your senses? Do you think there is only one Paradise? There are many Paradises and your son is in the (most superior) Paradise of Al-Firdaus.

— Collected by Muhammad al-Bukhari, Sahih al-Bukhari.

Furthermore, Samura narrated:

The Prophet said, "Last night two men came to me (in a dream) and made me ascend a tree and then admitted me into a better and superior house, better of which I have never seen. One of them said, 'this house is the house of martyrs.'

— Collected by Muhammad al-Bukhari, Sahih al-Bukhari.

A Muslim who is killed defending his or her property is considered a martyr.

One who dies protecting his property is also considered a martyr according to Hadith:

I heard the Prophet saying, "Whoever is killed while protecting his property then he is a martyr.

— Collected by Muhammad al-Bukhari, Sahih al-Bukhari.

While the Qur'an does not indicate much about martyrs' death and funeral, the hadith provides some information on this topic. For example, martyrs are to be buried two in one grave in their blood, without being washed or having a funeral prayer held for them. The following Hadith highlight this:

The Prophet collected every two martyrs of Uhud in one piece of cloth, then he would ask, "Which of them had (known) more of the Quran?" When one of them was pointed out for him, he would put that one first in the grave and say, "I will be a witness on these on the Day of Resurrection." He ordered them to be buried with their blood on their bodies and they were neither washed nor was a funeral prayer offered for them.

— Collected by Muhammad al-Bukhari, Sahih al-Bukhari.

== See also ==
- Shahid
- Shahid (disambiguation)
- Islamophobic trope – False or maliciously exaggerated claims about Muslims and Islam
- Martyrdom in Chinese culture
  - Kuomintang Islamic insurgency – 1950 counterinsurgency campaign
- Martyrdom in Christianity – Person killed for their testimony for or belief in Christianity
  - Military saint – Patron saints associated with the military
- Martyrdom in Iran – Aspect of Shia Islamic influence in Iran
- Martyrdom in Judaism – Sanctification of the name of God
  - Self-sacrifice in Jewish law – Suicide in Jewish Law
  - Olei Hagardom – Twelve members of Zionist paramilitary organizations executed by the British
- Martyrdom in Palestinian society
- Martyrdom in Sikhism

=== Sections ===
- Martyr § Islam
- Religious views on suicide § Islam
- Islamic view of death § Suicide
