= Benazir Bhutto University =

Benazir Bhutto University may refer to:

- Shaheed Benazir Bhutto University (Shaheed Benazirabad) in Nawabshah, Sindh
- Shaheed Benazir Bhutto City University in Karachi, Sindh
- Shaheed Benazir Bhutto Dewan University in Karachi, Sindh
- Shaheed Benazir Bhutto University of Veterinary & Animal Sciences in Sakrand, Sindh
- Benazir Bhutto Shaheed University (Karachi) in Karachi, Sindh
- Shaheed Benazir Bhutto University (Sheringal) in Dir, Khyber Pakhtunkhwa
- Shaheed Benazir Bhutto Women University in Peshawar, Khyber Pakhtunkhwa
- Shaheed Mohtarma Benazir Bhutto Medical University in Larkana, Sindh
- Mohtarma Benazir Bhutto Shaheed Medical College in Mirpur Azad Kashmir
- Shaheed Benazir Bhutto Medical College in Lyari, Karachi, Pakistan
- Benazir Bhutto Shaheed University of Technology and Skill Development, Khairpur, Sindh
