= Shaheed Benazir Bhutto University of Veterinary and Animal Sciences =

University in Pakistan

Shaheed Benazir Bhutto University of Veterinary & Animal Sciences, Benazirabad
- Motto in English: Knowledge is Power
- Type: Public
- Established: 2012
- Affiliations: HEC,
- Chancellor: Chief Minister of Sindh
- Vice-Chancellor: Muhammad Farooque Hassan
- Students: 500
- Undergraduates: 500
- Location: Aliabad, Cadet College Road, Nawabshah, Shaheed Benazirabad, Sindh, Pakistan
- Website: www.sbbuvas.edu.pk

Shaheed Benazir Bhutto University of Veterinary & Animal Sciences, Shaheed Benazirabad or SBBUVAS (Sindhi: شهيد بينظير ڀٽو يونيورسٽي آف ويٽرنري اينڊ اينيمل سائنسز), is a public sector degree-awarding institution located at Nawabshah, Sindh, Pakistan.

== Location ==
The main campus of the university was located in Sakrand City, district Shaheed Benazirabad. The government recently planned to upgrade it, but land was not available in the surrounding area, so the university was relocated to a new area outside the city near Aliabad Cadet College Road, Nawabshah.

== See also ==
- Shaheed Benazir Bhutto University (Shaheed Benazirabad) in Nawabshah, Sindh
- Shaheed Benazir Bhutto City University in Karachi
- Shaheed Benazir Bhutto Dewan University in Karachi
- Benazir Bhutto Shaheed University (Karachi) in Karachi, Sindh
- Shaheed Benazir Bhutto University (Sheringal) in Dir, Khyber Pakhtunkhwa
- Shaheed Benazir Bhutto Women University in Peshawar, Khyber Pakhtunkhwa
- Shaheed Mohtarma Benazir Bhutto Medical University in Larkana, Sindh
- Medical Colleges
- Mohtarma Benazir Bhutto Shaheed Medical College
- Shaheed Benazir Bhutto Medical College
- Law Colleges
- Shaheed Benazir Bhutto Law College
