= Shaheed Benazir Bhutto University, Shaheed Benazirabad =

Pakistani university

- SBBU SBA
- Motto: Knowledge, Commitment, Leadership
- Type: Public Sector University
- Established: 2012
- Affiliations: HEC,
- Chancellor: Governor of Sindh
- Vice-Chancellor: Engr. Ashir Khan Muhammad raza Palhvi
- Students: 2500
- Undergraduates: 2000
- Postgraduates: 500
- Location: Nawabshah(SBA), Sindh, Pakistan
- Website: Official website

Shaheed Benazir Bhutto University, Shaheed Benazirabad (Sindhi: شهيد بينظير ڀٽو يونيورسٽي، شهيد بينظيرآباد) is a public sector university located in Nawabshah, Sindh, Pakistan. It was established in 2012.

== Facilities include ==
- Computer labs
- Library
- Hostel
- Wifi Internet for Students
- Transport and on campus shuttles
- Gymnasium
- Auditorium
- Sport Complex
- Dispensary
- Mosque
- Canteen
- Courtyard
- Separate Car and Bike Parking

== List of Affiliated Colleges ==
- Government Degree Girls College, Nawabshah
- Government Sachal Sarmast Science And Arts College, Nawabshah
- Government Degree Boys College, Nawabshah
- Government Aisha Girls Degree College, Nawabshah
- Government Degree College 60 Mile (Nawabshah)
- Government Degree Boys College, Sakrand
- Government Degree Girls College, Sakrand
- Government Boys Degree College Daur, DAUR (SBA)
- Government Degree Boys College, Doulatpur
- Government Degree Girls College, Doulatpur
- Government Degree Boys College, Qazi Ahmed
- Government Aisha Girls Degree College, Nawabshah
- Government Degree Boys College, N.Feroze
- Government Degree Girls College, N.feroze
- Government Degree Mehran College, Moro
- Government Degree Girls College, Moro
- Government Girls Degree College Kalidabad, N.feroze
- Government Degree College, Tharushah
- Government Degree College, Kandiaro
- Government Degree College, Mehrabpur
- Government Degree Girls College, Mehrabpur
- Government Girls Degree College, Padidan
- Government Girls Degree College, Bhariya Road
- Mustafa Oriental College New Jatoi
- PSSSS Government Degree College Sanghar
- Government Degree Girls College, Sanghar
- Government Degree Boys College, Shahdadpur
- Government Degree Girls College, Shahdadpur
- Government NA Degree College, Tando Adam
- Government Degree Girls College, Tando Adam
- Government Degree College, Khipro
- Government Degree Boys College, Shahpur Chakar
- Government Degree Girls College, Shahpur Chakar
- UB Government Degree College, Dadu
- Government Degree Girls College, Dadu
- Government Degree College, K.N. Shah
- Government Degree College, Mehar
- Government Degree College, Juhi
- Government Degree Qazi Arif College Dadu
- Government Degree College Sita
- Government Elementary College Education (M), Dadu
- Government Elementary College Education (W), Dadu
- Government Elementary College Education (W), Moro
- Government Elementary College Education (M), Mithani
- Government Elementary College Education (M), Sanghar
- Government Elementary College Education (W), Sanghar

== Degree Programs in Affiliated Colleges ==
BS (4 years) Programs

The availability of specific programs may vary by college.

- BS Computer Science
- BS Chemistry
- BS Zoology
- BS English
- BS Sindhi
- BS Urdu

AD (2 years) Programs

The availability of specific programs may vary by college.

- AD Science
- AD Commerce
- AD Arts

== SBBU Main Campus ==
Faculties and Departments

Faculty of Science and Technology

- Department of Information Technology (IT)
- Department of Chemistry
- Department of Molecular Biology and Genetics
- Department of Microbiology
- Department of Computer Science (CS)

Faculty of Social Sciences

- Department of Education
- Department of English
- Department of Sindhi
- Department of Media & Communication Studies
- Department of Art and Design

Faculty of Management and Business Administration

- Department of Business Administration (BBA)
- Department of Economics
- Department of Statistics

Department of Law

== SBBU Naushahro Feroze Campus ==
It has 3 department

- Department of Business Administration(BBA)
- Department of Information Technology(IT)
- Department of English

== SBBU Sanghar Campus ==
It has 3 department

- Department of Business Administration(BBA)
- Department of Information Technology(IT)
- Department of English

== See also ==
- Shaheed Benazir Bhutto City University in Karachi
- Shaheed Benazir Bhutto Dewan University in Karachi
- Shaheed Benazir Bhutto University of Veterinary & Animal Sciences in Sakrand, Sindh
- Benazir Bhutto Shaheed University (Karachi) in Karachi, Sindh
- Shaheed Benazir Bhutto University (Sheringal) in Dir, Khyber Pakhtunkhwa
- Shaheed Benazir Bhutto Women University, previously known as the Frontier Women University, in Peshawar, Khyber Pakhtunkhwa
- Shaheed Mohtarma Benazir Bhutto Medical University in Larkana, Sindh

=== Medical colleges ===
- Mohtarma Benazir Bhutto Shaheed Medical College
- Shaheed Benazir Bhutto Medical College
