= Dewan Farooque Motors =

Automobile manufacturer

Dewan Farooque Motors Ltd.
- Company type: Public
- Traded as: PSX: DFML
- Industry: Automotive
- Founded: December 28, 1998
- Headquarters: Karachi, Pakistan
- Area served: Pakistan
- Key people: Haroon Iqbal (Chairman); Waseem-ul-Haq Ansari (CEO)
- Products: Automobiles
- Revenue: ▼ Rs. 0.212 million (US$760) (2023)
- Operating income: ▼ Rs. −181.513 million (US$−650,000) (2023)
- Net income: ▼ Rs. −230.805 million (US$−830,000) (2023)
- Total assets: ▼ Rs. 2.879 billion (US$10 million) (2023)
- Total equity: ▼ Rs. −3.242 billion (US$−12 million) (2023)
- Owner: Dewan Yousuf Farooqui (45.71%); Dewan Sugar Mills (9.84%)
- Number of employees: 44 (2023)
- Parent: Yousuf Dewan Companies
- Website: www.yousufdewan.com/DFML/index.html
- Footnotes / references Financials as of 30 June 2023

Dewan Farooque Motors Limited (Urdu: دیوان فاروق موٹرز) is a Pakistani automobile importer and manufacturer based in Karachi.

== History ==
Dewan Farooque Motors Company Limited was incorporated in December 1998 by Dewan Yousuf Farooqui to assemble Hyundai and Kia vehicles in Pakistan. This followed an earlier introduction of Kia cars in 1994 by Naya Daur Motors, which reportedly collected around Rs 800 million in booking fees from approximately 16,000 customers but delivered only a limited number of vehicles before its collapse.

Dewan Farooque Motors established a manufacturing facility in Sujawal, Sindh, at a cost of PKR 1.8 billion. Completed in about seven months, it was among the first automotive plants in the country to employ robotic paint systems. Between 2000 and 2011, Dewan Farooque Motors produced 95,429 vehicles, including Kia Spectra, Kia Sportage, Hyundai Santro models, and 50,000 Shehzore trucks. In 2009, automobile production stopped. After a gap of three years, Dewan Farooque Motors produced a few hundred cars in fiscal year 2014 and 2015 based on its old inventory. Dewan Farooque Motors in October 2016 announced that the company would start assembling vehicles in 2017 again.

In 2016, Dewan Farooque agreed to resume production of vehicles of South Korea based SsangYong, as Daehan-Dewan at its assembly plant in Sujawal.

On 19 January 2018, Dewan Farooque Motors announced it has received approval for its Brownfield plant from the Engineering Development Board and is expected to resume vehicle production from February 2018. On February 25, 2018 Dewan launched a cargo pickup truck under the popular Shehzore nameplate in collaboration with Daehan Motors (Vietnam).

In May 2024, Dewan Farooque announced plans to launch a cargo pickup truck under the popular Shehzore nameplate in collaboration with Kia Motor Corporation.

== Electric vehicles ==
In 2024, Dewan Farooque Motors unveiled their plans of producing electric cars in collaboration with Eco-Green Motors Limited. The company announced that they will begin the production of EGML’s Honri-Ve (200KM and 300KM range) in August 2024

== See also ==
- Yousuf Dewan Companies
