= Shaheed Mohtarma Benazir Bhutto Medical University =

University in Larkana, Pakistan

- Motto: Students ko Ragrha Do
- Type: Public
- Established: 9 July 2009
- Affiliations: Pakistan Medical and Dental Council, Pakistan Nursing Council, Pharmacy Council of Pakistan, College of Physicians and Surgeons Pakistan
- Chairman: Khalil-ur-Rehman Ramday
- Vice-Chancellor: Prof. Dr Nusrat Shah
- Provost: Dr. Adnan Wahab Qureshi
- Location: Larkana, Sindh, Pakistan
- Mascot: SMBBMUian
- Website: www.smbbmu.edu.pk

Shaheed Mohtarma Benazir Bhutto Medical University (SMBBMU) (Sindhi: شهيد محترمه بينظير ڀٽو ميڊيڪل يونيورسٽي) is a public university of medicine, nursing, pharmacy and allied health sciences. It was established on 9 July 2009. It is located in Larkana, Sindh, Pakistan.

The university is named after Benazir Bhutto who was twice the Prime Minister of Pakistan. Professor Doctor Sikandar Ali Sheikh was its first vice-chancellor.

== Constituent colleges ==
- Chandka Medical College, Larkana
- Ghulam Muhammad Mahar Medical College, Sukkur
- Gambat Institute of Medical Sciences, Gambat
- Bibi Aseefa Dental College, Larkana
- Benazir Institute Of Nursing and Community Health Sciences, Larkana

== See also ==
- Mohtarma Benazir Bhutto Shaheed Medical College
- Shaheed Benazir Bhutto Medical College
- Shaheed Benazir Bhutto City University in Karachi
- Shaheed Benazir Bhutto Dewan University in Karachi
- Shaheed Benazir Bhutto University (Shaheed Benazirabad) in Nawabshah, Sindh
- Shaheed Benazir Bhutto University of Veterinary & Animal Sciences in Sakrand, Sindh
- Benazir Bhutto Shaheed University (Karachi) in Karachi, Sindh
- Shaheed Benazir Bhutto University (Sheringal) in Dir, Khyber Pakhtunkhwa
- Shaheed Benazir Bhutto Women University, previously known as the Frontier Women University, in Peshawar, Khyber Pakhtunkhwa
