= Shaheed Benazir Bhutto City University =

- Motto in English: Learning for Success
- Type: Private
- Established: 2013
- Affiliations: Higher Education Commission (Pakistan)
- Chancellor: Governor of Sindh
- Location: Karachi, Sindh, Pakistan
- Website: www.sbbcu.edu.pk

Shaheed Benazir Bhutto City University (Sindhi: شهيد بينظير ڀٽو سٽي يونيورسٽي) or SBBCU is a private degree awarding Institution located in Karachi, Pakistan. The University was established in 2013.

== Faculties and Departments ==
- Department of Business Administration & Commerce
- Department of Science & Technology
- Department of Art & Design
- Department of Education

== See also ==
- Shaheed Benazir Bhutto Dewan University in Karachi
- Shaheed Benazir Bhutto University (Shaheed Benazirabad) in Nawabshah, Sindh
- Shaheed Benazir Bhutto University of Veterinary & Animal Sciences in Sakrand, Sindh
- Shaheed Benazir Bhutto University (Sheringal) in Dir, Khyber Pakhtunkhwa
- Shaheed Benazir Bhutto Women University, previously known as the Frontier Women University, in Peshawar, Khyber Pakhtunkhwa
- Shaheed Mohtarma Benazir Bhutto Medical University in Larkana, Sindh, previously known as Chandka Medical College
- Mohtarma Benazir Bhutto Shaheed Medical College
- Shaheed Benazir Bhutto Medical College
