= Shaheed Benazir Bhutto Women University =

- Former name: Frontier Women University
- Motto in English: Enlightment through Knowledge
- Type: Public
- Established: 2005
- Affiliations: Higher Education Commission of Pakistan
- Chancellor: Governor of Khyber Pakhtunkhwa
- Vice-Chancellor: Safia Ahmed
- Location: Peshawar, Khyber-Pakhtunkhwa, Pakistan
- Campus: Peshawar, Swabi
- Colours: Green and White
- Nickname: SBBWU
- Website: www.sbbwu.edu.pk

Shaheed Benazir Bhutto Women University, previously known as the Frontier Women University, is located in Peshawar, Khyber Pakhtunkhwa, Pakistan. It was formed as a result of an order from Khyber Pakhtunkhwa government in 2004 and the university has been functioning since 2005. It also has a campus in Swabi.

== Departments ==
The university currently has the following Departments.

- Department of Islamiyat
- Department of Physics
- Department of Law
- Department of Political Science
- Department of Psychology
- Department of Biochemistry
- Department of Chemistry
- Department of Bio-Informatics
- Department of Statistics
- Department of Management Sciences
- Department of Mathematics
- Department of Urdu
- Department of Economics
- Department of Art & Design
- Department of Education
- Department of Microbiology
- Department of Computer Science
- Department of English Language & Literature

== See also ==
- Shaheed Benazir Bhutto City University
- Shaheed Benazir Bhutto Dewan University
- Shaheed Benazir Bhutto University of Veterinary & Animal Sciences
- Benazir Bhutto Shaheed University (Karachi)
- Shaheed Benazir Bhutto University (Sheringal)
- Shaheed Benazir Bhutto University (Shaheed Benazirabad)
- Shaheed Mohtarma Benazir Bhutto Medical University
- Mohtarma Benazir Bhutto Shaheed Medical College
- Shaheed Benazir Bhutto Medical College
