= Shaheed Mohtarma Benazir Bhutto Medical College Lyari =

Medical school in Karachi, Pakistan

Shaheed Mohtarma Benazir Bhutto Medical College شہید محترمہ بینظیر بھٹو طبی کالج
- Type: Government
- Established: 2012
- Affiliations: PM&DC
- Location: Karachi, Pakistan
- Nickname: SMBBMC

Shaheed Mohtarma Benazir Bhutto Medical College (Urdu: شہید محترمہ بینظیر بھٹو طبی کالج, or SMBBMC) is a medical school in Lyari, Karachi, Pakistan, that opened in March 2011. The Principal of the college is Dr. Anjum Rehman. The college was opened with financial support from the Government of Pakistan. Shaheed Mohtarma Benazir Bhutto Medical College part of Lyari General Postgraduate Medical Centre also known as Lyari General Hospital. It also has Institute of Cardiology and is a teaching hospital. It was formerly affiliated with Dow University of Health Sciences.

== Departments ==
Shaheed Mohtarma Benazir Bhutto Medical College has following departments:

- Department of Anatomy
- Department of Pathology
- Department of Physiology
- Department of Biochemistry.
- Department of Forensic Medicine
- Department of pharmacology

== See also ==
- Shaheed Benazir Bhutto City University in Karachi
- Shaheed Benazir Bhutto Dewan University in Karachi
- Shaheed Benazir Bhutto University of Veterinary & Animal Sciences in Sakrand, Sindh
- Benazir Bhutto Shaheed University (Karachi) in Karachi, Sindh
- Shaheed Benazir Bhutto University (Sheringal) in Dir, Khyber Pakhtunkhwa
- Shaheed Benazir Bhutto University (Shaheed Benazirabad) in Shaheed Benazirabad, Sindh
- Shaheed Benazir Bhutto Women University in Peshawar, Khyber Pakhtunkhwa
- Shaheed Mohtarma Benazir Bhutto Medical University in Larkana, Sindh
- Mohtarma Benazir Bhutto Shaheed Medical College
