= Christian views on suicide =

Christian theological perspectives on suicide

Early Christians believed that suicide is sinful and an act of blasphemy. Modern Christians do not consider suicide an unforgivable sin (though still wrong and sinful) or something that prevents a believer who died by suicide from achieving eternal life.

== Early Christianity ==
Suicide was common before Christianity, in the form of personal suicide, to avoid shame or suffering, and also in the form of institutional suicide, such as the intentional deaths of a king's servants, the forced deaths of convicted criminals, the willing suicides of widows, and euthanasia for the elderly and infirm. The Donatists, an early Christian sect, contained a fanatical group named the Circumcellions who would attack strangers on the street and attain supposed martyrdom. Early Christianity established a ban on suicide, greatly reducing its occurrence.

In the fifth century, Augustine wrote The City of God, in it making Christianity's first overall condemnation of suicide. His biblical justification for this was the interpretation of the commandment, "Thou shalt not kill", as he sees the omission of "thy neighbor", which is included in "Thou shalt not bear false witness against thy neighbor", to mean that the killing of oneself is not allowed either. The rest of his reasons were from Plato's Phaedo.

In the sixth century AD, suicide became a secular crime and began to be viewed as sinful. In the 13th century, Thomas Aquinas denounced suicide as an act against God and as a sin for which one could not repent. In 1533, those who died by suicide while accused of a crime were denied a Christian burial. In 1562, all suicides were punished in this way. In 1693, even attempted suicide became an ecclesiastical crime, which could be punished by excommunication, with civil consequences following. Civil and criminal laws were enacted to discourage suicide, and as well as degrading the body rather than permitting a normal burial, the property and possessions of both the person who died by suicide and of their family were confiscated.

== Protestant views ==
Psalm 139, verse 8, reads "If I ascend to heaven, you are there; if I make my bed in Sheol, you are there." It has often been discussed in the context of the fate of those who die by suicide.

The Waldensian Evangelical Church has taken a favorable stance on assisted suicide.

The Southern Baptist Convention, the largest Protestant denomination in the United States, says that the "intentional ending of innocent human life, whether by oneself or with the assistance of another, is contrary to biblical teaching".

The Church of England has historically held that suicide is a mortal sin. However, the church advocated for the decriminalisation of attempted suicide in 1959 and, since 2017, allows Christian funerals for suicide victims.

== Modern Catholicism ==
According to the theology of the Catholic Church, death by suicide is a grave matter. The Church holds that one's life is the property of God, and to destroy that life is wrongly to assert dominion over God's creation, or to attack God remotely. In the past, the Catholic Church would not conduct funeral services for persons who killed themselves, and they could not be buried in a Catholic cemetery. However, the church lifted the prohibition on funerals for suicide victims in the 1980s.

In 1992, Pope John Paul II promulgated the new Catechism of the Catholic Church, which acknowledged the role that mental illnesses may play in suicide. Regarding the effect of psychological disorders on a person's culpability, the Catechism states that:

Grave psychological disturbances, anguish, or grave fear of hardship, suffering, or torture can diminish the responsibility of the one committing suicide.

Despite the fact that historical Catholic doctrine—as seen in the Baltimore Catechism used in the United States from 1885 until the 1960s—generally considered suicide to be a mortal sin, the Catholic Church rejected this conclusion with the introduction in 1992 of the Catechism of the Catholic Church, which declares:

We should not despair of the eternal salvation of persons who have taken their own lives. By ways known to him alone, God can provide the opportunity for salutary repentance. The Church prays for persons who have taken their own lives.

However, as noted by Rev. Charles T. Rubey, director and founder of the LOSS program, Loving Outreach to Survivors of Suicide, there are "still some priests who view suicide as a mortal sin, (although) that has been categorically denied by church leadership." As recently as 2018, the Archdiocese of Detroit was compelled to offer an apology on behalf of one of their priests after a pastoral failure during the funeral mass of a suicide victim.

The Catholic Church defines suicide very narrowly to avoid the extrapolation that Jesus's death was a type of suicide, brought about by his own choices, and to avoid the idea that Catholic martyrs choosing death is a valid form of suicide. Instead, Catholics give praise that Jesus resisted suicide throughout his trials, demonstrating that no degradation is so great that suicide can be justified. Martyrs are honored for the same reason.

== Mormon views ==
In the largest denomination of Mormonism the Church of Jesus Christ of Latter-day Saints (LDS Church), teachings on suicide have spanned over a century, with leaders teaching that suicide is against the will of God, though, Church teachings on suicide have changed through the years. In 2018, the LDS apostle Dale G. Renlund stated "that suicide will not be a defining characteristic of their eternities." The LDS Church opposes physician-assisted suicide and euthanasia.

== Rates of suicide among Christians ==
The rate of suicide among Catholics is consistently lower than among Protestants, with Jewish suicide usually lower than both, except during times of persecution against Jews, for instance, during World War II. But religion is not the only factor in per capita suicide: among Catholics in Italy, the suicide rate is twice as high in Northern Italy than in the southern parts. Hungary and Austria have majority Catholic populations but they are number 2 and number 5 in the list of countries that have the highest suicide rate. And in Ireland, the Catholic and Protestant populations have the same low rate of suicide. French sociologist Émile Durkheim wrote that the higher rate of Protestant suicide is likely due to the greater degree of "the spirit of free inquiry" in the various Protestant groups, whereas the Catholic church supplies its worshippers with a relatively unchanging system of faith, delivered by a hierarchy of authority.

== Suicide loss awareness and support ==
With the growing rate of suicides worldwide, a number of Christian faith-based efforts have begun to address the needs of those in the church who have lost a loved one to suicide. Rick Warren, after the suicide of his son Matthew in 2013 following a lifelong struggle with mental illness, has become a prominent advocate for removing the stigma around suicide within the church and broader society. Kayla Stoecklein, after the death of her husband Andrew, at the time pastor of Inland Hills Church (now Verve City Church) to suicide, wrote Fear Gone Wild, receiving international acclaim for the memoir of her husband's struggle. Terry A. Osborn, American academic, has also co-authored a book with his wife, for use in Christian faith-based support groups through the Christian Association for Survivors of Suicide Loss.

== See also ==
- Jewish views on suicide
- Religious views on suicide
- Samaritans (charity)
