= Mohammad Hossein Fahmideh =

Iranian child soldier (1967–1980)

Shaheed Mohammad Hossein Fahmideh
- محمد حسین فهمیده
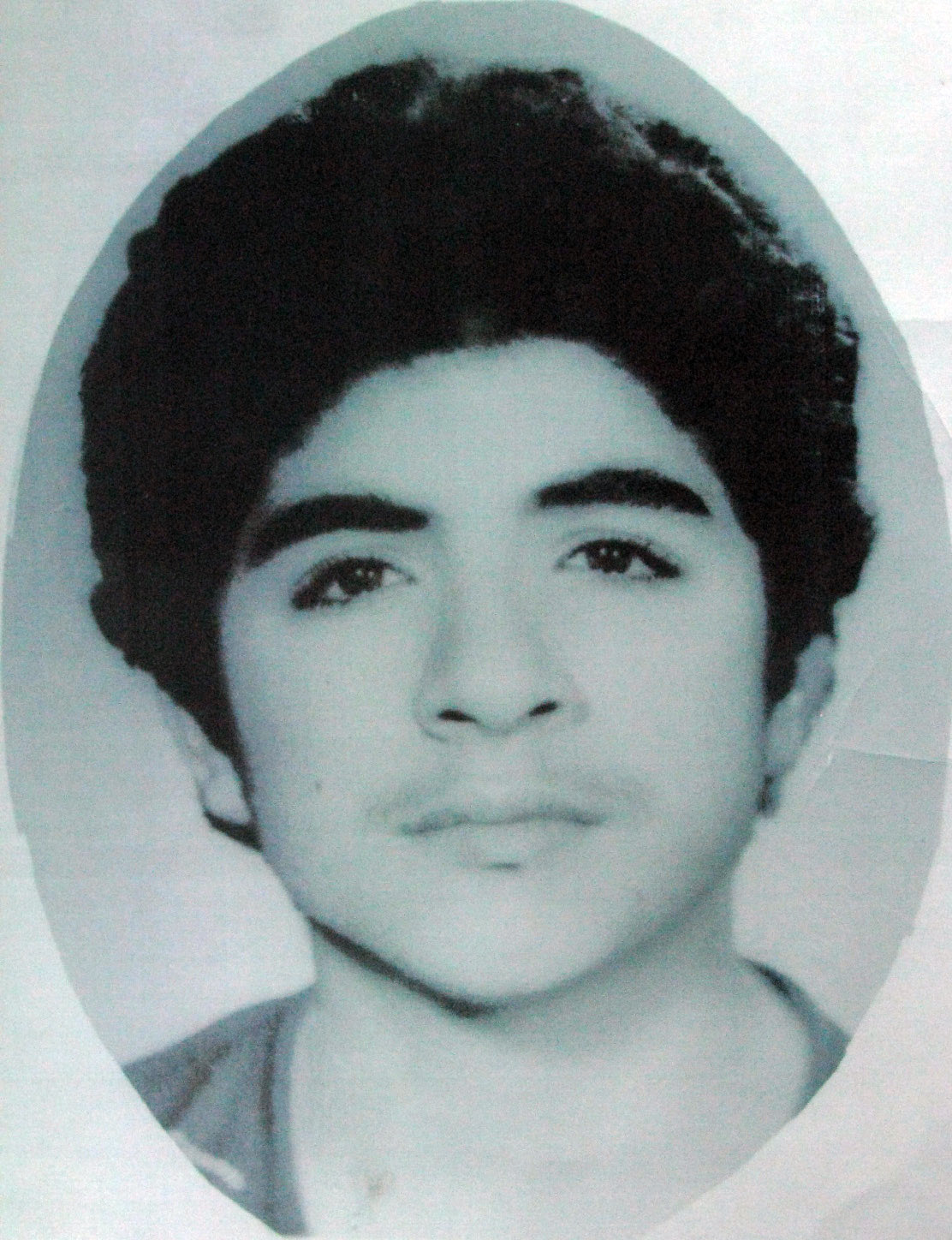
- Portrait of Fahmideh in the Martyrs' Museum, Tehran
- Born: 6 May 1967; Qom, Imperial State of Iran
- Died: 30 October 1980 (aged 13); Khorramshahr, Iran
- Burial place: Behesht-e Zahra, Tehran
- Military career
- Allegiance: Islamic Republic of Iran
- Branch: Basij
- Engagements: Iran–Iraq War; First Battle of Khorramshahr †
- Awards: Order of Fath (first-grade)

Mohammad Hossein Fahmideh (Persian: محمد حسین فهمیده; 6 May 1967 – 30 October 1980) was an Iranian child soldier and an icon of the Iran–Iraq War. During the First Battle of Khorramshahr in 1980, he served with the Basij and fought invading Iraqi forces in and around the city of Khorramshahr. Fahmideh is credited with having halted the advance of an Iraqi tank column after he jumped underneath an Iraqi tank and detonated a full grenade belt, killing himself in the process. He is celebrated as a war hero in Iran.

== Background ==
In September 1980, Iraq launched a full-scale invasion of Iran, sending five armoured and mechanized divisions across the Shatt al-Arab to attack the oil-rich Khuzestan Province in southern Iran, quickly seizing several towns in the area. By 10 November, Iraqi forces had captured the key city of Khorramshahr after a protracted battle with Iranian resistance.

== Military service ==
According to his official biography, Fahmideh was a 13-year-old boy from Qom who, at the outbreak of the war in 1980, left his home without his parents' knowledge to go to southern Iran and aid in the defence of Khorramshahr, then a city at the frontlines of the conflict. In the besieged city of Khorramshahr, he fought side-by-side with older Iranian soldiers. Fahmideh was amongst the Iranians who engaged in fierce house-to-house battles in which thousands of Iraqis and Iranians were killed. At one point, Iraqi forces had pushed the Iranians back as they were passing through a very narrow canal. Due to a lack of RPG-7 rockets and the sensitive formation of the Iraqi tanks, Fahmideh, seeing that his older comrades were already dead or wounded, wrapped himself in a grenade belt from a nearby corpse, pulled the pins out, and jumped underneath an advancing Iraqi tank, killing himself and disabling the tank. This led the Iraqi tank column to believe that the Iranians had extensively mined the area, and ceased their advance. Later, Voice of the Islamic Republic of Iran broadcast a breaking news story describing the incident. A near identical tactic was previously used in the Second Sino-Japanese War. At the 1937 Battle of Shanghai, a suicide bomber halted a tank column by detonating himself beneath the lead vehicle. During the 1938 Battle of Taierzhuang, Chinese suicide troops again charged at tanks with explosives strapped to their bodies.

In Iran, Fahmideh's story inspired many Iranians during the war to risk death to protect the country, and has been heralded by leaders in Iran from Ruhollah Khomeini to Mohammad Khatami. Khomeini declared Fahmideh to be an Iranian national hero, and made references to him in several of his speeches:

Our leader is that 13-year-old child, who, with his small heart—worth more than hundreds of tongues and pens—threw himself with a grenade under the enemy tank, destroying it and drinking the nectar of martyrdom himself.

Fahmideh is buried in the Behesht-e Zahra cemetery in Tehran in section 24, row 44, number 11. A monument to him was erected on the outskirts of Tehran and has become a place of pilgrimage for young religious Iranians. In the years following Fahmideh's death, murals have been erected throughout Iran, book bags displaying him were sold to children, and, in 1986, a postage stamp was issued in his memory. Streets, hospitals, schools, and a sports stadium have been named in his honour. The day of his death, 30 October, marks the "Student Basij Day" in the official calendar of the Iranian state.

== Award ==
Fahmideh was posthumously awarded the first-grade Order of Fath on 27 September 1989 after the Iran–Iraq War, becoming its first recipient.

== See also ==
- Martyrdom in Iran
- Chinese suicide squads, Chinese nationalist forces who used a near identical tactic
- National Revolutionary Army § Dare to Die Corps
- Meir Feinstein, teenage militant who blew himself up with a hand grenade to avoid being hung for terrorism, a controversial national hero.
- Suicide attack § Children and teenagers
