= Benazir Bhutto Shaheed University Lyari =

Pakistani university

Benazir Bhutto Shaheed University: Lyari Karachi
- بینظیر بھٹو شہید یونیورسٹی لیاری کراچی
- Motto in English: Knowledge is Power
- Type: Public
- Established: 2010
- Affiliations: HEC
- Chancellor: Governor of Sindh
- Vice-Chancellor: Akhtar Baloch
- Location: Karachi, Sindh, Pakistan
- Website: www.bbsul.edu.pk

Benazir Bhutto Shaheed University: Lyari Karachi (BBSUL) (Urdu: بینظیر بھٹو شہید یونیورسٹی لیاری کراچی) is a Public Degree Awarding Institution located at Lyari town, Karachi, Pakistan. It was established in 2010.

Facilities like Gymnasium for sports, Auditorium for functions, Computer Labs, Library, Mosque, Canteen, Courtyard, etc. will be available.

Initially, the university has been set up at Government Boys Degree College, Lyari.

== Faculties and departments ==
- Department of Business Administration
- Department of Computer Science
- Department of Information technology
- Department of Commerce
- Department of English
- Department of Education
- Department of Pharmacy
- Department of Economics
- Department of Pharmacy

== See also ==
- Shaheed Benazir Bhutto University of Veterinary & Animal Sciences in Sakrand, Sindh
- Shaheed Benazir Bhutto University (Sheringal) in Dir, Khyber Pakhtunkhwa
- Shaheed Benazir Bhutto University (Shaheed Benazirabad) in Shaheed Benazirabad, Sindh
- Shaheed Benazir Bhutto Women University, previously known as the Frontier Women University, in Peshawar, Khyber Pakhtunkhwa
- Shaheed Mohtarma Benazir Bhutto Medical University in Larkana, Sindh
- Medical Colleges
  - Mohtarma Benazir Bhutto Shaheed Medical College
  - Shaheed Benazir Bhutto Medical College
- Law Colleges
  - Shaheed Benazir Bhutto Law College
