= Dewan Group =

Group of companies in Pakistan

- Formerly: Dewan Mushtaq Group
- Type: Corporate group
- Traded as: PSX: DFML; PSX: DFSM; PSX: DWAE
- Industry: Corporate group
- Founded: 1912; 114 years ago
- Founder: Dewan M Mushtaq Farooque
- Headquarters: Karachi, Pakistan
- Key people: Dewan Yousuf Farooqui (chairman)
- Owner: Dewan family
- Number of employees: 3,400 (2019)
- Website: yousufdewan.com

Dewan Group is a group of companies headquartered in Karachi.

== History ==
Dewan Group was founded in 1912 as Sh Dewan Muhammad Mushtaq by Dewan M. Mushtaq Farooque. Its early business was focused on trading secondhand garments, procured in Karachi and sold in Delhi.

Following the partition of India, the family relocated from Patiala, East Punjab to Karachi. In 1948, Dewan family founded Dewan Mushtaq Sons, operating from a small shop on North Napier Road. Over time, the family encountered several tragedies coinciding with their business milestones. Dewan Mushtaq died in 1968, and in 1970, a vehicular accident claimed the lives of his wife, their son Noman, and a daughter while traveling to the foundation stone ceremony of Dewan Textile Mills in Kotri, the group's first cotton spinning unit.

After these events, leadership transitioned to Dewan Umar Farooque, the second eldest son, who expanded the business into importing second-hand clothes and tea. Under his leadership, the group became a major player in the Pakistan Secondhand Cloth Merchant Group and the Tea Traders Association of Pakistan.

Between 1970 and 1978, Dewan Umar and his brother Dewan Salman established additional textile spinning units in Kotri and Hyderabad, as well as a sugar mill in Thatta with a production capacity of 5,000 tons.

In 1990, Dewan Group and Mitsubishi Corporation entered into an agreement establishing Dewan Salman Fibre (DSF). Polyester fibre production began in 1992 and around this time, a 12.5% sales tax was introduced on PTA and MEG.

In 1994, Dewan Group undertook Pakistan's first Euro Convertible Bond issue for Unit II, as the sales tax on PTA and MEG rose to 15%. Unit II commenced production in 1995. In 1996, Dewan Salman Fibres relinquished a previously held sales tax concession.

In 1998, Dewan Group founded Dewan Farooque Motors. By 2000, the first Kia Classic car was produced, and the group completed the acquisition of Dhan Fibre.

In 2003, Dewan Group established Dewan Farooque Textile Mills. In 2004, the group acquired Pakland Cement for Rs 1.1 billion, along with Khoski Sugar Mill, Bawany Sugar Mill, and Al Asif Sugar Mill, and made an investment in Dewan Petroleum.

In 2006, an attempt to restructure Dewan Salman Fibres' debt did not succeed. By 2007, banks limited working capital availability, and Dewan Zia stepped down as chairman, succeeded by Dewan Yousuf. The group recorded its first net loss, primarily due to Dewan Salman Fibres' financial performance. In 2008, all entities within the group reported losses, leading to a default.

== Companies ==
The group owns the following companies:

=== Cement ===
- Dewan Cement
- Pakland Cement, 1984

Dewan Karachi Plant established in 1982, having total capacity of 5880 tons/day. Dewan Hattar Plant established in 1995, having total capacity 3780 tons/day. Yousuf Dewan Companies acquired the Pakland Cement Limited, Karachi and Saadi Cement Limited, Hattar on May 17, 2004.

Dewan Hattar Cement Limited merged Dewan Cement Limited on 22-Oct-2007.

=== Automotive ===
- Dewan Motors Private Limited
- Dewan Mushtaq Motor Company (Pvt.) Ltd.
- Dewan Automotive Engineering Limited (defaulter)
- Dewan Farooque Motors Limited

=== Textile ===
- Dewan Textile Mills Limited (defaulter)
- Dewan Khalid Textile Mills Limited (defaulter)
- Dewan Mushtaq Textile Mills Limited (defaulter)
- Dewan Farooque Spinning Mills Limited (defaulter)
- Dewan Salman Fibre Limited (defaulter)

=== Sugar ===
- Dewan Sugar Mills Limited (defaulter)

== Educational institutes ==
The group owns the following educational institutes:

- Shaheed Benazir Bhutto Dewan University
