= Terry A. Osborn =

American academic

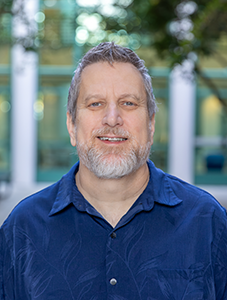

Terry A. Osborn is an American academic who is Professor of Education at the University of South Florida and an authority in applied linguistics and interdisciplinary curriculum. He served fifteen years as a higher education administrator, including twice as Interim Chancellor, Vice Chancellor of Academic and Student Affairs, and was previously Dean of the College of Education at the University of South Florida Sarasota-Manatee. He advocated for the college regularly including through op-ed articles Osborn taught public school for six years. He was on the faculties of Fordham University, Queens College of City University of New York and the University of Connecticut.

Osborn researches and publishes in the areas of world language education. He was a founding board member of the International Society for Language Studies and founding co-editor of Critical Inquiry in Language Studies: An International Journal currently published by Routledge. He is Executive Director of the Florida Association of Colleges for Teacher Education. He is editor of several academic book series in education.

Osborn has authored or edited a total of 84 publications throughout his career. His scholarly body of work includes 17 peer-reviewed books, 29 peer-reviewed book chapters, and 20 peer-reviewed journal articles, alongside 18 invited academic contributions. His research primarily focuses on foreign language education, critical pedagogy, social justice, and teacher education. His research has received a number of awards, including the American Educational Studies Association's Critic's Choice Award for his book, Critical Reflection and the Foreign Language Classroom. Osborn was awarded the Stephen Freeman Award by NECTFL for the best published article on foreign language teaching techniques. His work on teaching world languages for social justice has been described as seminal in the field. In 2022, Osborn was awarded the Distinguished Scholar and Lifetime Achievement in Language Studies by the International Society for Language Studies.

Osborn has been a featured expert or keynote speaker in over 29 venues, including The University of Texas, the University of Wisconsin, the University of Florida, the University of Georgia, Istanbul Technical University, Calvin College, Lee University, Rice University, Baylor University, Muhlenberg College, Pädagogische Hochschule Wien, Vienna, Austria and Seoul National University. He was a featured scholar in ACTFL Educator Spotlight.

Osborn was also a co-founder of the Christian Association for Survivors of Suicide Loss, a 501(c)3 charity offering a faith-based perspective for those who have lost a loved one to suicide.

== Selected publications ==
=== Books (peer-reviewed) ===
- Osborn, T. A. (2000). Critical reflection and the foreign language classroom. In Henry A. Giroux, (Ed.), Critical Studies in Education and Culture Series. Bergin & Garvey. [Winner of the American Educational Studies Association Critics’ Choice Award 2001]
- Davis, J. F. & Osborn, T. A. (2002). The language teacher's portfolio: A guide for professional development. Praeger Publishing.
- Osborn, T. A., (Ed.). (2002). The future of foreign language education in the United States. Bergin & Garvey.
- Reagan, T. & Osborn, T. A. (2002). The foreign language educator in society: Toward a critical pedagogy. Lawrence Erlbaum Associates.
- Kaufman, D., Moss, D. M., & Osborn, T. A., (Eds.), (2003). Beyond the boundaries: A transdisciplinary approach to learning and teaching. Praeger Publishing.
- Osborn, T. A. (2005). Critical reflection and the foreign language classroom (Rev. ed.). Information Age Publishing.
- Osborn, T. A., (Ed.). (2005). Language and cultural diversity in U. S. schools: Democratic principles in action. Praeger Publishing.
- Osborn, T. A. (2006). Teaching world languages for social justice: A sourcebook of principles and practices. Lawrence Erlbaum Associates.
- Osborn, T. A., (Ed.). (2007). Language and cultural diversity in U. S. schools: Democratic principles in action (revised from Praeger version). Rowman & Littlefield Education.
- Smith, D. I., & Osborn, T. A., (Eds.). (2007). Spirituality, social justice, and language education. Information Age Publishing.
- Moss, D. M., Kaufman, D., & Osborn, T. A., (Eds.). (2008). Interdisciplinary education in an age of assessment. Routledge/Lawrence Erlbaum Associates.
- Moss, D. M., & Osborn, T. A., (Eds.). (2010). Critical essays on resistance in education. In S. Steinberg, (Ed.), Counterpoints: Studies in the Postmodern Theory of Education series. Peter Lang Publishing.
- Reagan, T. & Osborn, T. A. (2021). World language education as critical pedagogy: The promise of social justice. Routledge.
- Osborn, T. A. (2021). Critical reflection and the foreign language classroom (20th anniversary ed.) Information Age Publishing.
- Reagan, T. & Osborn, T. A. (2021). The art and science of teaching: An introduction to education. Kendall Hunt.
- Bratkovich, M. & Osborn, T. A. (2023). Transdisciplinary research in language education: Reimagining pathways for equitable pedagogies. Teachers College Press.
- Reagan, T. & Osborn, T. A. (2025). Teaching world languages in middle and secondary schools: A critical introduction. Emerald Publishing.

=== Book chapters (peer-reviewed) ===
- Anderson, P. M. & Osborn, T. A. (2002). Responding to literature in the foreign language classroom: Aesthetic dimensions of fluency. In T. A. Osborn, (Ed.), The future of foreign language education in the United States (pp. 63-76). Bergin & Garvey.
- Gerwin, D. & Osborn, T. A. (2002). Challenging the monovocal narrative: Interdisciplinary units in the foreign language classroom. In T. A. Osborn, (Ed.), The future of foreign language education in the United States (pp. 77-91). Praeger.
- Osborn, T. A. (2002). Introduction. In T. A. Osborn, (Ed.), The future of foreign language education in the United States (pp. xiii-xvi). Bergin & Garvey.
- Kaufman, D., Moss, D. & Osborn, T. A. (2003). Where do we go when we step beyond the boundaries? In D. Kaufman, D. M. Moss, & T. A. Osborn, (Eds.), Beyond the boundaries: A transdisciplinary approach to learning and teaching (pp. 155-166). Praeger.
- Moss, D., Kaufman, D., & Osborn, T. A. (2003). Going beyond the boundaries. In D. Kaufman, D. M. Moss, & T. A. Osborn, (Eds.), Beyond the boundaries: A transdisciplinary approach to learning and teaching (pp. 1-12). Praeger.
- Osborn, T. A. (2003). Corpus disciplinae? Toward a critical prognosis for contemporary language teacher preparation. In G. Bräuer & K. Sanders, (Eds.), New visions in foreign and second language education (pp. 273-280). LARC Press.
- Osborn, T. A. (2003). Not so foreign languages: The critical inquiry approach to moving beyond disciplines. In D. Kaufman, D. M. Moss, & T. A. Osborn, (Eds.), Beyond the boundaries: A transdisciplinary approach to learning and teaching (pp. 33-46). Bergin & Garvey.
- Gerwin, D. & Osborn, T. A. (2005). What September 11th also teaches us. In T. A. Osborn, (Ed.), Language and cultural diversity in U. S. schools, 105-116. Praeger.
- Osborn, T. A. (2005). Foreign language education: It’s not just for conjugation anymore. In T. A. Osborn, (Ed.). Language and cultural diversity in U. S. schools (pp. 65-76). Praeger.
- Osborn, T. A. & Osborn, D. C. (2005). Participating in democracy means participating in schools. In T. A. Osborn, (Ed.). Language and cultural diversity in U.S. schools (pp. 1-4). Praeger.
- Osborn, T. A. (2007). Confronting the Zeitgeist: Social justice, the spirit of the people, and language education. In D. Smith & T. A. Osborn, (Eds.), Spirituality, social justice, and language education (pp. 3-11). Information Age Publishing.
- Kaufman, D., Moss, D. & Osborn, T. A. (2008). In praise of complexity: Moving interdisciplinary assessment in education from theory to practice. In D. M. Moss, T. A. Osborn, & D. Kaufman, (Eds.), Interdisciplinary education in an age of assessment 179-190. Routledge/Lawrence Erlbaum Associates.
- Moss, D., Osborn, T. A., & Kaufman, D. (2008). The promise of interdisciplinarity. In D. M. Moss, T. A. Osborn, & D. Kaufman, (Eds.). Interdisciplinary education in an age of assessment, 1-6. Routledge/Lawrence Erlbaum Associates.
- Osborn, T. A. (2008). Language learning as an interdisciplinary endeavor. In D. M. Moss, T. A. Osborn, & D. Kaufman, (Eds.). Interdisciplinary education in an age of assessment (pp. 107-118). Routledge/Lawrence Erlbaum Associates.
- Osborn, T. A. (2009). Reconsidering Roadside Assistance: The problem with Christian approaches to teaching the English language. In M. S. Wong & S. Canagarajah, (Eds.), Christian and critical English language educators in dialogue: Pedagogical and ethical dilemmas (pp. 215-218). Routledge/Taylor & Francis.
- Moss, D. & Osborn, T. A. (2010). Introduction: Considering resistance. In D. Moss & T. A. Osborn, (Eds.), Critical essays on resistance in education (pp. 1-6). Peter Lang Publishing.
- Osborn, T. A. (2010). Planting the seeds of resistance: The times they have a-changed. In D. Moss & T. A. Osborn, (Eds.). Critical essays on resistance in education (pp.7-10). Peter Lang Publishing.
- Wagner, M. & Osborn, T. A. (2010). When worlds collide: Liberal arts and college of education faculty co-teaching the methods courses. In J. Davis, (Ed.). World language teacher education: Transitions and challenges in the 21st century (pp. 3-16). Information Age Publishing.
- Cammarata, L., Tedick, D. J., & Osborn, T. (2016). Curricular reforms and content-based instruction: Issues and goals. In L. Cammarata, (Ed.) Content-based foreign language teaching: Curriculum and pedagogy for developing advanced thinking and literacy skills (pp. 1-21). Routledge/Taylor Francis.
- Reagan, T. & Osborn, T. A. (2017). Reification of the English language and the hegemonic turn. In M. Djuraeva & V. Tochon, (Eds.). Language policy or the politics of language: Reimagining the role of language in a neoliberal society (pp. 281-308). Deep University Press.
- Reagan, T. & Osborn, T. A. (2019). Time for a paradigm shift in U.S. foreign language education? Revisiting rationales, evidence and outcomes. In D. Macedo, (Ed.). Decolonizing foreign language education (pp. 73-110). Routledge.
- Osborn, T. A. & Reagan, T. (2020). Critical pedagogy and social justice in world language education: Beyond Conscientização. In P Iida, T. Reagan, J. W. Schwieter, C. T. McGivern, & J. M. Ho, (Eds.) Readings in Language Studies, Critical Perspectives on Teaching, Learning, and Society (Volume 8, pp. 1-18). International Society for Language Studies.
- Osborn, T. (2023). Reflections on the power of professional unity: Florida’s FACTE and COVID Response. In D. Vyortkina, N. Collins, N., & T. Reagan, (Eds.) Keep calm, teach on: Education responding to a pandemic (pp. 135-140). Charlotte, NC: Information Age Publishing.
- Osborn, T. A. (2021). Interdisciplinarity and Language Education. In 서울대학교 국어교육연구소서울대학교 [Seoul National University Institute of Korean Language Education Seoul National University] (Eds.),융복합 시대, 자국어교육의 학문적 정체성[Convergence Age: The Academic Identity of Native Language Education] (pp. 437-447). Seoul National University.
- Osborn, T. A. (2022). "The World” language education: New frontiers for critical reflection. In Wassell, B. & Glynn, C., (Eds.), Pushing boundaries: Transforming world language teaching and teacher education for equity and justice (pp 123-137). Multilingual Matters.
- Osborn, T. A. (2023). Social Justice in World Language Education: Transdisciplinary Issues. In Bratkovich, M. & Osborn, T. A., (Eds.), Transdisciplinary research in language education (pp. 9-18). Teachers College Press.
- Osborn, T. A. & Bratkovich, M. (2023). Introduction. In Bratkovich, M. & Osborn, T. A., (Eds.), Transdisciplinary research in language education: Reimagining pathways for equitable pedagogies (pp. 1-8). Teachers College Press.
- Bratkovich, M. & Osborn, T. A. (2023). Conclusion. In Bratkovich, M. & Osborn, T. A., (Eds.), Transdisciplinary research in language education: Reimagining pathways for equitable pedagogies (pp. 129-130). Teachers College Press.
- Wagner, M., Osborn, T. A., & Affleck, V. (2025). The why and how of teaching for social justice and intercultural citizenship: Experiences of early adopters. In V. Russell & K. Murphy-Judy (Eds.), Handbook of research on world language instruction (pp. 201–215). Routledge.

=== Journal articles (peer-reviewed) ===
- Osborn, T. A. (1998). Providing access: Foreign language learners and genre theory. Foreign Language Annals, 31(1), 40-47.
- Osborn, T. A. & Reagan, T. (1998). Why Johnny can't hablar, parler or sprechen: Foreign language education and multicultural education. Multicultural Education, 6(2), 2-9.
- Reagan, T. & Osborn, T. A. (1998). Power, authority, and domination in foreign language education: Toward an analysis of educational failure. Educational Foundations, 12(2), 45-62.
- Osborn, T. A. (1999). Reflecting on foreignness: The challenges of a new millennium. New York State Association of Foreign Language Teachers Annual Meeting Series, 16, 21-24.
- Osborn, T. A. (2000). Literature in the standards-based classroom. New York State Association of Foreign Language Teachers Annual Meeting Series, 17, 55-58.
- Osborn, T. A. (2001). Making connections and comparisons: Integrating foreign language with other core curricula. NECTFL Review, 49, 28, 30-33. [Winner of the Northeast Conference on the Teaching of Foreign Languages Stephen A. Freeman Award 2003]
- Osborn, T. A., Asher, R. & Gerwin, D. (2001). Migration stories: Beyond the single discipline. New York State Association of Foreign Language Teachers Annual Meeting Series, 18, 33-36.
- Asher, R., Gerwin, D. & Osborn, T. A. (2002, October). Telling community stories. SchoolArts, 102(2), 49-51.
- Osborn, T. A. (2003, Spring). Market ideology, critical educational studies, and the image of foreign language education. NECTFL Review, 52, 41-46.
- Osborn, T. A. (2004). When culture kills? Food allergies and the foreign language curriculum. NECTFL Review 54, 43-47.
- Reagan, T. & Osborn, T. A. (2004). Reflections on critical language studies and the genesis of a counter paradigm. Critical Inquiry in Language Studies: An International Journal, 1(4), 237-241.
- Osborn, T. A. (2007). Teaching world languages for social justice. Journal of Christianity and Foreign Languages, 8, 11-23.
- Ness, M. & Osborn, T. A. (2010). Would you like fries with that: The dangers of customer service in reading teacher education. Critical Inquiry in Language Studies, 7(4), 334-348.
- Wagner, M. & Osborn, T. A. (2010). Depositioning the "foreign": Considering the challenges and opportunities of a postmodern foreign language education. NYSABE Journal, 1(1), 34-44.
- Osborn, T. A., Reagan, T., & Freiberg, J. A. (2011). Textual Concept Critical Analysis: Toward a research approach for language studies. Critical Inquiry in Language Studies, 8(1), 1-26.
- Osborn, T. A. (2016, 28 June). Architects Wanted for Professional Remodeling: A Response to Ennser–Kananen. The Modern Language Journal, 100(2), 568-570.
- Swanson, P., & Osborn, T. A. (2016). Building social capital alongside a strong sense of efficacy. Foreign Language Annals 49(2), 197-198.
- Osborn, T. A. & Wagner, M. (2023): Revisiting ‘foreignness’: Nationalism and language education, Language and Intercultural Communication, 23(3), 347-359. DOI: 10.1080/14708477.2023.2175847
- Reagan, T., Osborn, T. A., & Collins, N. (2026). Teaching culture in the Russian as a world language classroom: The place of the concept of the Русский мир. Critical Inquiry in Language Studies. Advance online publication. https://doi.org/10.1080/15427587.2026.2614738

=== Invited academic contributions ===
- Osborn, T. A. (2005). Series foreword. In D. M. Moss, W. J. Glenn., & R. L. Schwab, (Eds.), Portrait of a profession: Teaching and teachers in the 21st century, (pp. xi-xii). Praeger.
- Osborn, T. A. & Gerwin, D. (2007). Series foreword. In P. G. Harwood & V. Asal, Educating the first digital generation, (pp. ix-x). Information Age Publishing.
- Osborn, T. A. (2007). Series introduction. In A. S. Marcus, Celluloid blackboard: Teaching history with film, (p. ix). Information Age Publishing.
- Osborn, T. A. (2007). Series preface. In M. Mantero, Ed., Identity and second language learning: Culture, inquiry, and dialogic activity in educational contexts, (p. vii). Information Age Publishing.
- Osborn, T.A. (2010). Series introduction. In J. F. Davis, World language teacher education: Transitions and challenges in the twenty-first century, (p. ix). Information Age Publishing.
- Osborn, T. A. (2012, July 16). College prepares teachers to spread gospel of arts integration. Sarasota Herald Tribune. Retrieved from www.heraldtribune.com.
- Osborn, T. A. (2017, April 13). How do we stop the brain drain? Sarasota Herald Tribune. Retrieved from www.heraldtribune.com.
- Osborn, T. A. (2017, May 11). Growing interest in USF Sarasota-Manatee from local students. Sarasota Herald Tribune. Retrieved from www.heraldtribune.com.
- Osborn, T. A. (2017, May 12). Commencement season a time for colleges to reflect, celebrate. Bradenton Herald. Retrieved from www.bradenton.com.
- Osborn, T. A. (2017, November 23). At USF Sarasota-Manatee, career advisers lay foundation for student success. Sarasota Herald Tribune. Retrieved from www.heraldtribune.com.
- Osborn, T. A. (2017, October 26). Community access and engagement key to USF Sarasota-Manatee mission. Sarasota Herald Tribune. Retrieved from www.heraldtribune.com.
- Osborn, T. A. (2017, September 28). More than simply a place to learn. Sarasota Herald Tribune. Retrieved from www.heraldtribune.com.
- Osborn, T. A. (2017, December 16). Alliance colleges commit to STEM program growth. Bradenton Herald. Retrieved from www.bradenton.com.
- Osborn, T. A. (2018). Foreword. In C. Glynn, P. Wesely, & B. Wassell, Words and actions: Teaching languages through the lens of social justice. American Council on the Teaching of Foreign Languages.
- Osborn, T. A. (2023). Foreword. In Davidson, K.F., Johnson, S. M. & Randolph Jr., L. J. (Eds.). How we take action: Social justice in K-16 language classrooms. Information Age Publishing.
- Osborn, J. B. & Osborn, T. A. (2023). Moving forward: A Christian study for survivors of suicide loss. Christian Association for Survivors of Suicide Loss/Lulu.
- Osborn, J. B. & Osborn, T. A. (2023). Moving forward: A Christian study for survivors of suicide loss, Leaders guide. Christian Association for Survivors of Suicide Loss/Lulu.
- Osborn, J. B. & Osborn, T. A. (2023). Questions Christians have about suicide. Christian Association for Survivors of Suicide Loss/Lulu.
