= Shaheed Zulfiqar Ali Bhutto University of Law =

University in Karachi, Pakistan

- شہید ذوالفقار علی بھٹو یونیورسٹی آف لا
- Type: Public
- Established: 2013
- Affiliations: Chartered by the Government of Sindh; Recognized by HEC and the Pakistan Bar Council
- Chancellor: Governor of Sindh
- Vice-Chancellor: Justice (R)
- Location: Karachi, Sindh, Pakistan
Colours
Green and White
- Website: szabul.edu.pk

The Shaheed Zulfiqar Ali Bhutto University of Law (SZABUL) (Sindhi: شهيد ذولفقار علي ڀٽو يونيورسٽي آف لا) is a Public University situated in Karachi, Sindh, Pakistan. SZABUL has unique privilege to be the first ever Law University in Pakistan. It is recognized by the Higher Education Commission (Pakistan) and Pakistan Bar Council. It offers B.A LL.B. (5 years), BS Criminology (4 years), Bachelors of Business Administration (BBA 4 years, 2 years), LL.M and PHD programs. Justice (R) Qazi Khalid Ali was the founding vice chancellor appointed in 2013. Justice (Rtd) Kusar Sultana Hussain is the current vice chancellor of the university appointed in 2025.

== Detailed introduction ==
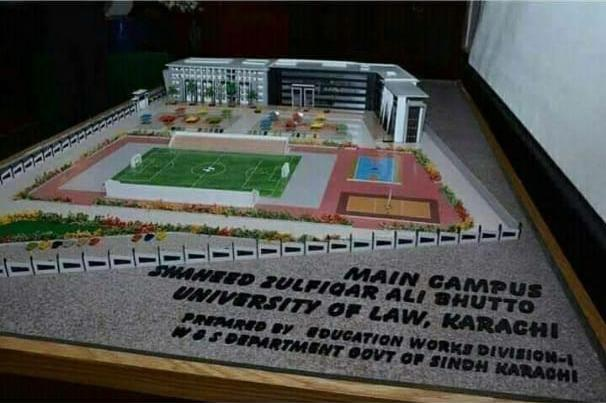
Shaheed Benazir Campus of SZABUL, Korangi, Karachi

Shaheed Zulfiqar Ali Bhutto University of Law was established by the Govt. of Sindh through enactment of Shaheed Zulfiqar Ali Bhutto University of Law Karachi Act, 2012 (Sindh Act XIII of 2013). The faculty at SZABUL consists of PHD holding professors, retired judges, senior Advocates, bureaucrats and foreign educated barristers. The university's city campus is situated near 3 Talwar in Clifton, Khaliq-u-zama road Karachi. Shaheed Benazir campus of the university which expands to the area of about 50 Acres has been newly established in Korangi Karachi. Moreover, the Government of Sindh has also promised to allot a 250 Acres of land in Education city at Link Road between National Highway and Super Highway Karachi for Main Campus. The construction of the Hostels for boys and girls are projected to be completed by 2023. In December 2021, three students from SZABUL; Muzamil Ahmed, Sania Qazi & Sami Ullah represented the University at the 36th edition of the Jean Pictet Competition in International Humanitarian Law held in Durrës, Albania. The team was the first to lead SZABUL in an overseas competition.

== See also ==
- Zulfiqar Ali Bhutto § Death
