= Yoram Schweitzer =

Israeli intelligence official

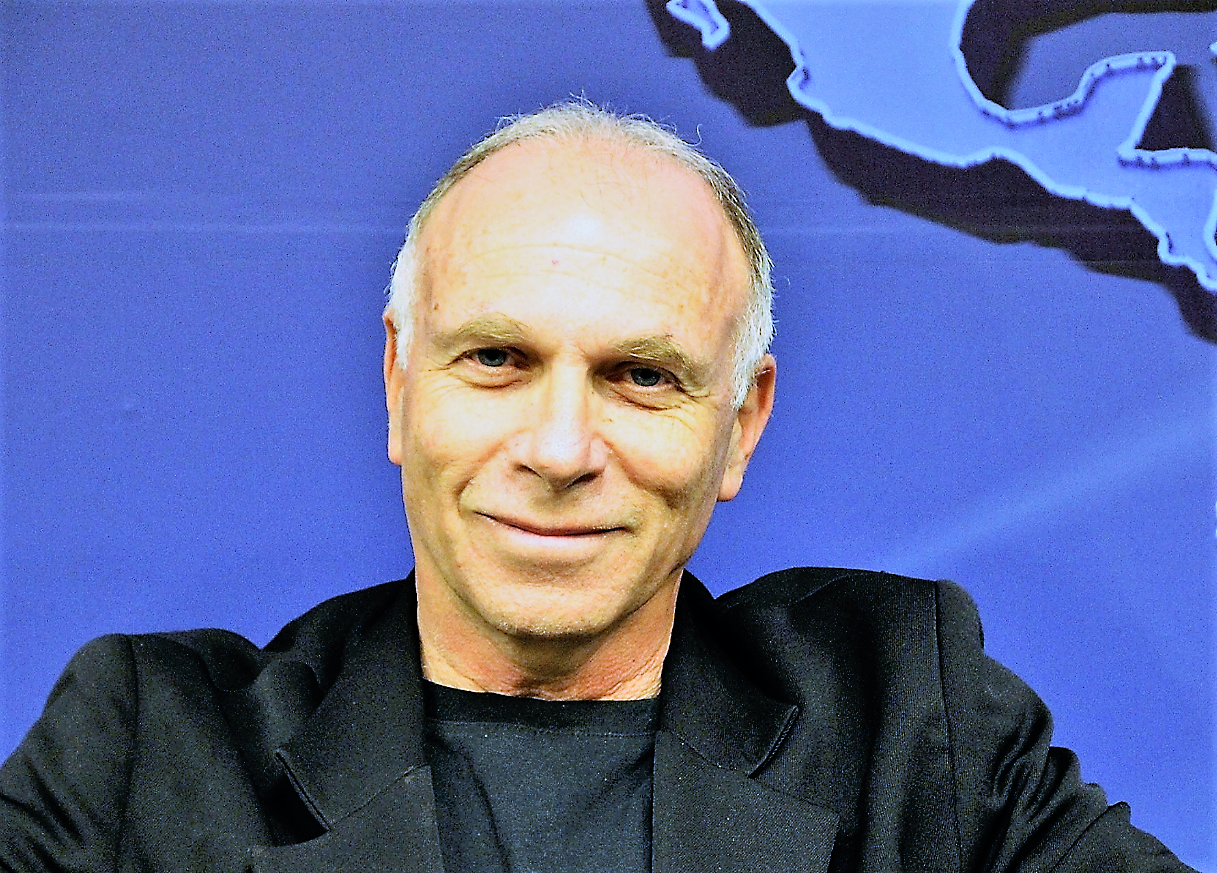
Yoram Schweitzer

Yoram Schweitzer is an Israeli intelligence official who is a senior research fellow at Israel's Institute for National Security Studies (INSS) and is director of the institute's Research Program: Terrorism and Low-Intensity Conflict.

During 2017, Schweitzer was to be a visiting fellow at the Center for American Progress. Formerly, he served as a senior Military Intelligence officer and private consultant to the Office of the Prime Minister of Israel.

Schweitzer's areas of research include the Salafi Jihadi “camp” including The Islamic State (Daesh) and its subjected partners; Al Qaeda and its affiliates; Hezbollah; and Palestinian terror groups. He is an authority on terror related topics, including suicide bombings in which he conducted a project interviewing attempted suicide bombers and their dispatchers.

== Biography ==
From 1987 to 1998, Schweitzer intermittently headed the International Terrorism Section of the Israeli Defense Force's Military Intelligence Directorate. During these years, he also served as a ranking member of the Israeli prime minister's MIA task force. Subsequently, Schweitzer served both as the director of education at Herzliya's Institute for Counter-Terrorism, and as a private consultant to the Prime Minister's office on matters of counter-terrorism. In 2003 he joined the INSS, then the Jaffe Center for Strategic Studies. . Schweitzer holds the rank of lieutenant colonel (Lt-Col) in the IDF, and continues to serve in the IDF's reserve forces in his field of expertise.

== Current research ==
Schweitzer is currently researching and publishing in the following areas:

Salafiya Jihadia: . Schweitzer is analyzing the brand of global terrorism launched by groups adhering to this belief and its attendant ideology.

Suicide attacks: Schweitzer has explored and probed the mind of the suicide bomber as well as the aims and strategies of those who dispatch them. He conducted a three-year-long project comprising in-depth studies, analyses and interviews with attempted suicide bombers, suicide-bombing dispatchers, and leaders of Palestinian terror organizations. This included leaders in Israeli prisons, and others who were released as part of the exchange deal to secure the freedom of Gilad Shalit. Mr. Schweitzer is an authority on female and underage suicide bombers.

Hostage Negotiation/MIA: Pursuant to his service in official capacities in these areas, Schweitzer continues to conduct research on the related topics of hostages and negotiations for their release.

Psychological warfare: Schweitzer is currently studying and analyzing the propaganda campaigns being deployed by the Islamic State as well as by Al-Qaeda and its affiliates.

Sub-conventional warfare: Mr. Schweitzer is currently exploring the tactical and strategic lessons from the campaigns in Iraq and Afghanistan.

== Notable publications ==
- The Islamic State: How Viable Is It? (co-editor, 2016)
- Al-Qaeda's Odyssey to the Global Jihad (coauthored with Aviv Oreg 2014).
- Ed: Female Suicide Bombers: Dying for Equality? (2006).
- Al-Qaeda and the Internationalization of Suicide Terrorism (2005)
- The Globalization of Terror: The Challenge of Al - Qaida and the Response of the International Community (co-authored with Shaul Shay, 2003).
