= Martyrdom in Iran =

Aspect of Shia Islamic influence in Iran

The concept of martyrdom is understood in the Western world as facing persecution and giving of one's life for a set of beliefs, most often religious beliefs. The definition of martyrdom (shahid) is expanded in Iran, where martyrs (Persian: شهیدان, romanized: šahidân, sing. شهید, šahid) are greatly revered, including martyrs from the distant past as well as martyrs from the modern age. In Iran, Shia Islam is the majority religion, at 89% of the estimated 79 million inhabitants, and is a very important part of public and political life. The Shia concept of martyrdom has been shaped by the deaths of the early martyrs of the Shia faith, Ali and Husayn ibn Ali, and Iranian society and government have further shaped the understanding of martyrdom in the modern age.

== Shia roots ==
=== Martyrdom of Ali and Husayn ===
The genesis of Shia Islam is rooted in the idea that the charismatic and politico-religious authority possessed by Muhammad was transferred to his biological descendants after his death in 632 CE. The resulting claim to the rightful leadership of the Muslim community (the ummah) was thus supposed to pass, in the form of the Imamate, to the descendants of Muhammad’s daughter Fatima (606–632) and her husband Ali b. Abi Talib (600–661). Yet the political reality in the decades after Muhammad's death diverged from that vision.

After the death of Mohammad in the year 632, a disagreement arose between the followers of Mohammad as to who should be appointed as Muhammad's successor. The Muslims were split between two groups, those who supported Abu Bakr, a companion of Muhammad, and those who supported Ali, Muhammad's cousin and son-in law. Ultimately, Abu Bakr became the first caliph, and his followers are today known as Sunni Muslims. The followers of Ali are known as Shia Muslims.

Abu Bakr served for two years, and appointed Umar as his successor in 634. Umar served as caliph for ten years, during which he was responsible for the rapid spread of Islam through military and territorial gains. Upon his death in 644, a council of Islamic leaders elected a new Caliph, Uthman ibn Affan, of the Umayyad family. However, in 656 supporters of Ali, who believed that a descendant of Mohammad should lead the Muslim community, assassinated Uthman and installed Ali as the fourth caliph. Ali's reign was marred by numerous violent struggles between his supporters and the supporters of Muawiyah I, a relative of Uthman and the governor of Syria.

When Ali was murdered in the year 661 by a supporter of Muawiyah, he became the first martyr of the Shia faith.

Ali had two sons, Hasan ibn Ali and Husayn, who the Shia believe continued their father's struggle in different ways. Hasan renounced his right to the caliphate in a compromise with Mu'awiya, which the Shia view as Hasan's rational recognition of his own constraints at the time, but Husayn sought to restore the caliphate to the family of Ali by military means.

When Muawiyah died in the 680 and his son Yazid I assumed the caliphate, Husayn renewed his efforts to regain the caliphate. On the advice of supporters in Kufa, a supposed stronghold of Shia support, Husayn and a small numbers of his family and supporters traveled to Kufa, camping out in nearby Karbala. However, the governor of Kufa was aware of Husayn's presence and sent close to 4000 troops to Karbala. After several days of failed negotiations, as Husayn refused to recognize Yazid as caliph, the governor's soldiers massacred Husayn and 72 of his men. This massacre, which occurred on the 10th day of the month of Muharram, elevated the martyrdom of Husayn to almost mythical levels in Shia belief.

== Martyrdom in the public domain ==
=== Muharram and Ashura ===
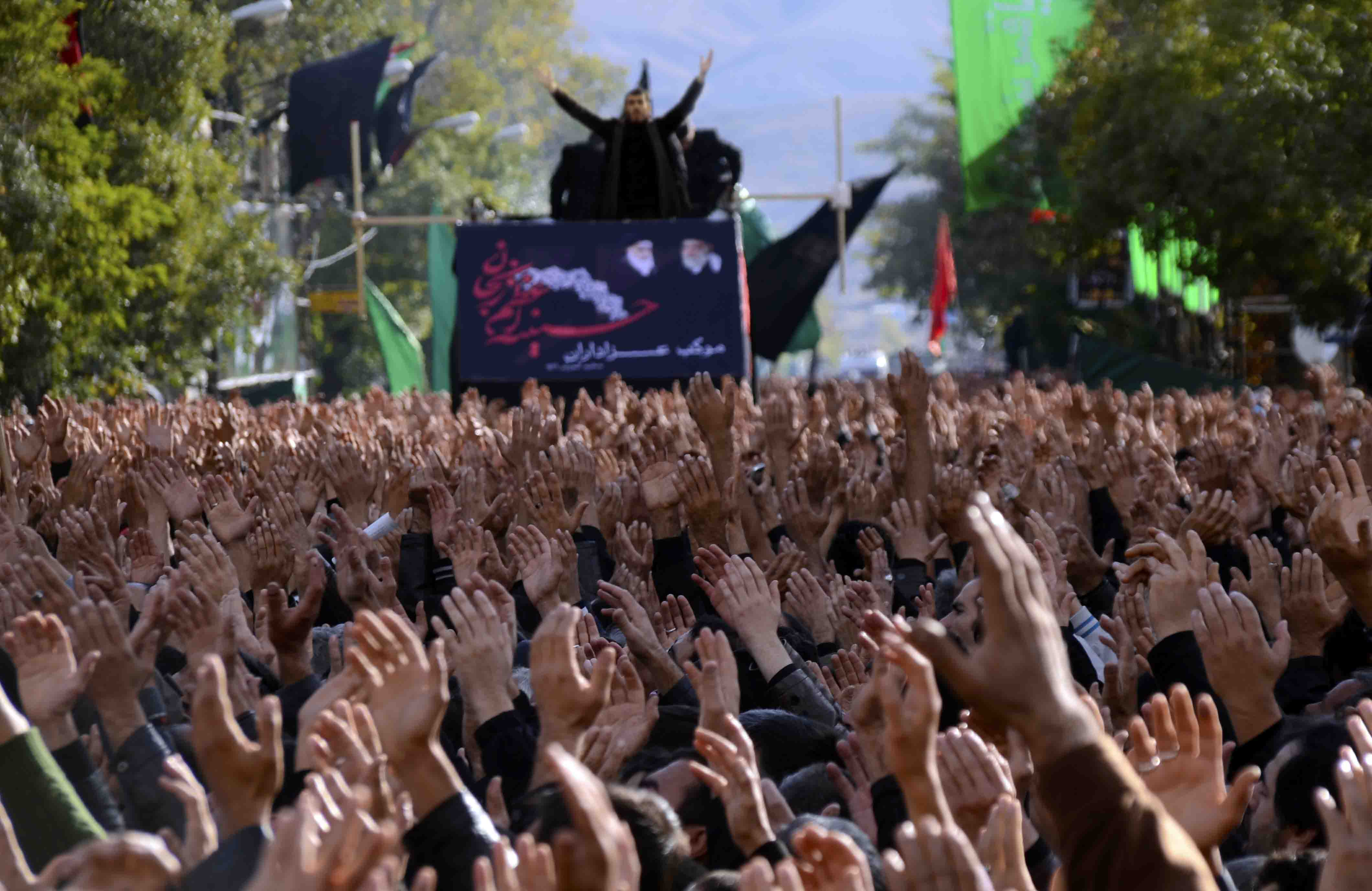
Mourning of Muharram in Iran

The Iranian concentration on the Martyrs of the past, especially the Imam Husayn, is evident during the Month of Muharram. The first ten days of this month are filled with public processions and demonstrations that recall the suffering of Husayn. These demonstrations have been occurring for hundreds of years. The explorer Thomas Herbert reported on his travels to the area now known as Iran in 1650, and gave this description of the events of Muharram: "I haue seene them nine seuer-all days in great multitudes, in the streets all together crying out Hussan Hussan." During these ten days, mourners reenact the events at Karbala and pay respect to Husayn and several of his companions and family members who were also martyred.

=== Martyrs in the modern day ===
In Iran today, those who died in the revolution and the soldiers who died in the Iran/Iraq War are also considered martyrs. These modern-day martyrs are also treated with great respect after their deaths. The special treatment of martyrs begins during the burial, as martyrs have special burial rites and the graves are well maintained, surrounded by Islamic flags, shady plants, framed pictures of the deceased, and carvings of Quranic verses. Graveyards that hold the bodies of martyrs have taken on the characteristics of a public park, with families gathering to have picnics by the graves of their loved ones while listening to hired performers play music, recite poetry, or read verses from the Quran. The largest of these graveyards is the Behesht-e Zahra, where there is even a theater that plays dramatic reenactments of battles from the war.

The state does a lot to remind the public of the sacrifices of the dead even beyond the graveyard. After the Iran–Iraq war, many street names and school names were changed to the names of martyrs, and these names remain today. Portraits of deceased soldiers are included in murals that line the streets, and pictures of martyrs hang from the walls in local mosques. Martyrs museums can be found in most major Iranian cities, and there are even some camps where children of martyrs from the Iran–Iraq war can go to learn about the sacrifices of their fathers and sing songs from the revolution. Additionally, the themes of martyrdom are evident in children's textbooks from a very young age, with as much as 10 percent of the texts depicting themes of death and martyrdom.

=== Social mobility ===
While the loss of a loved one is clearly a tragic and distressing event for a family, the families of martyrs in Iran were well taken care of. Having a martyr in the family meant immediate and permanent social mobility for many families. It was a mark of respect to have lost a son in the war, and the public displays honoring martyrs kept the memory of a family's loss alive in the community. Even beyond the social support of the community, the families of martyrs received certain tangible benefits. A large percentage of spots in many schools were reserved for the children of martyrs and having a martyr in the family gave a job applicant an edge against other applicants. Families of war martyrs were given certificates of martyrdom at the event of their child's death which gave them discounts for groceries and clothes.

Societies were set up for the sole purpose of helping the families martyrs or the "living martyrs" who were injured during the Iran–Iraq War. However, some families complained, especially later in the Iran/Iraq War, that their sacrifices were being increasingly ignored, and donations meant for martyrs' families were decreasing.

== Politicization of martyrdom ==
=== Iranian Revolution ===
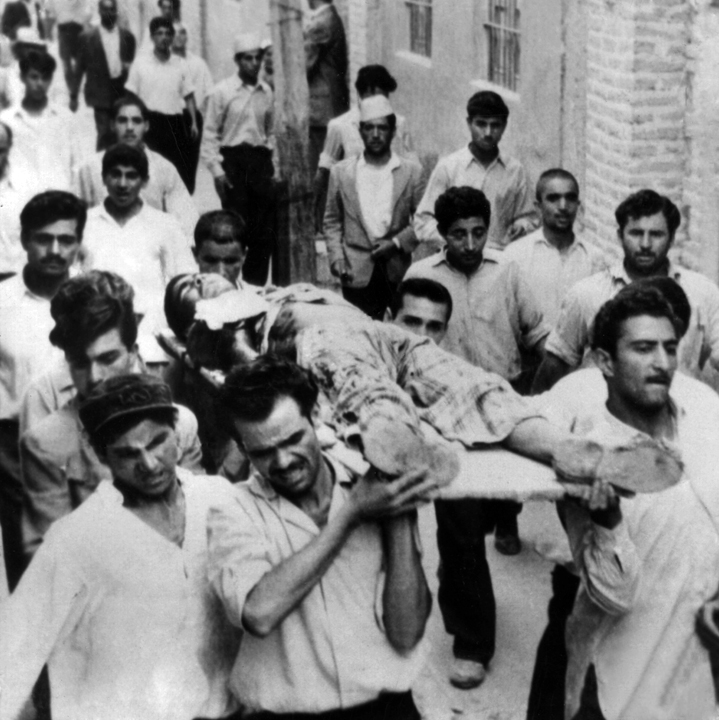
Protesters carrying the body of one of the victims

The concept of martyrdom in Iranian society has played an important role in the major political conflicts of the past century. During the Iranian Revolution of 1979, revolutionary leaders such as Ayatollah Ruhollah Khomeini reinterpreted the events of Karbala as a stand against oppression, using this narrative to strengthen the resolve of the people against Iran's leader at the time, Shah Mohammad Reza Pahlavi. Ayatollah Khomeini referred to Karbala and martyrdom many times in his speeches, most notably in the speech given on the eve of the Shah's departure from Iran "[Husayn] taught us that if a tyrant rules despotically over the Muslims in any age, we must rise up against him." Khomeini labeled the Shah as "the Yazid of our time," referring to the caliph of Husayn's time whose soldiers were responsible for the Karbala massacre. Popular slogans also reflected the importance of symbols of martyrdom, such as the slogan often seen on banners: "every land is Karbala, every month is Muharram, every day is Ashura." The revolutionaries therefore considered those who died at the hands of the Shah's secret police to be martyrs, especially those killed during the Black Friday Massacre, a clash between government troops and peaceful protestors that led to the deaths of around 100 people.

The willingness of the revolutionaries to die for their cause in the name of martyrdom was a powerful tool in overthrowing the Shah. Major clashes with police would often occur in a 40-day cycle, as Iranian tradition demanded 40 days of mourning ending with public memorial processions for the deceased. The memorial processions of the martyrs of the revolution would thus turn into protest marches that led to more clashes with police and more deaths, starting the cycle over again and increasing the number of participants and therefore the strength of the revolution.

=== Iran–Iraq War ===
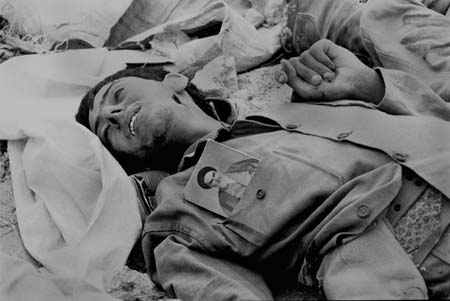
Iranian soldier killed during the Iran–Iraq War with Rouhollah Khomeini's photo on his uniform

The definition of a martyr broadened further during the Iran–Iraq War from 1980 to 1988. The extremely costly and destructive war between a Sunni-controlled country (Iraq) and a Shia-controlled country (Iran) had several parallels with the events at Karbala, which led to further exploitation of the Iranian reverence for martyrdom. Saddam Hussein's Iraq was seen as the Sunni aggressor against the Shia people and therefore took on the role of the new Yazid in Iranian political discourse. Iranian leaders strongly emphasized the similarities between Karbala and the war with Iraq in order to retain public support for the war and keep the flow of volunteer soldiers steady. The death toll was high, with about two hundred thousand dead on the Iranian side alone.

To encourage volunteers, religious leaders broadened the definition of a martyr, announcing that all fatalities of the war were to be considered martyrs for the country, and therefore for Islam. Even Non-Muslim Iranian soldiers who sacrificed themselves in the line of duty were celebrated by the clerical regime. For example, Mehrdad Nahravand, a Zoroastrian Air Force pilot from the city of Gorgan, who deliberately crashed his F-4 jet into a column of Iraqi Tanks after being shot down, was lauded as a 'martyr' despite his religion and statues of him were erected in his hometown. Similar was the case of Ardeshir Esfandpour, a Zoroastrian Helicopter pilot from the city of Mianeh who after being shot down behind enemy lines in a battle near Ilam, deliberately called in an airstrike on his position, which was being captured by the Iraqis. Or Hoshang Nowshirwanian, a poor Zoroastrian carpenter from the city of Yazd, who was conscripted into a Sapper battalion and single-handedly attacked an Iraqi Tank in order to save his commanding officer, for which the city council of Yazd commissioned a street name for him Even those who did not die in battle but were wounded were called living martyrs, however this position did not bring as much social mobility as the families of those who died.

Additionally, Iranian leaders would manufacture parallels between the war and the events at Karbala. In one memorable example, Iranian state television reported seventy-two deaths in a particularly bloody bombing in Iran. While in reality the death toll was higher, this fabricated number matched the number of Husayn's followers who were martyred in Karbala. Battles were named Karbala Two, Three, and so on. Actors were hired to play the role of the Hidden Imam before dangerous battles, calling out to the soldiers to participate in suicide missions. Slogans on the soldiers' shirts read "Imam Khomeini has given me special permission to enter Heaven."

For those martyred in the war who were unmarried, wedding tables were set up above their graves, a tradition that came from the death of Qassim, a companion of Husayn at Karbala who was killed just before his wedding and whose body was placed in the tent where he was intended to be married.

=== Iranian green movement ===
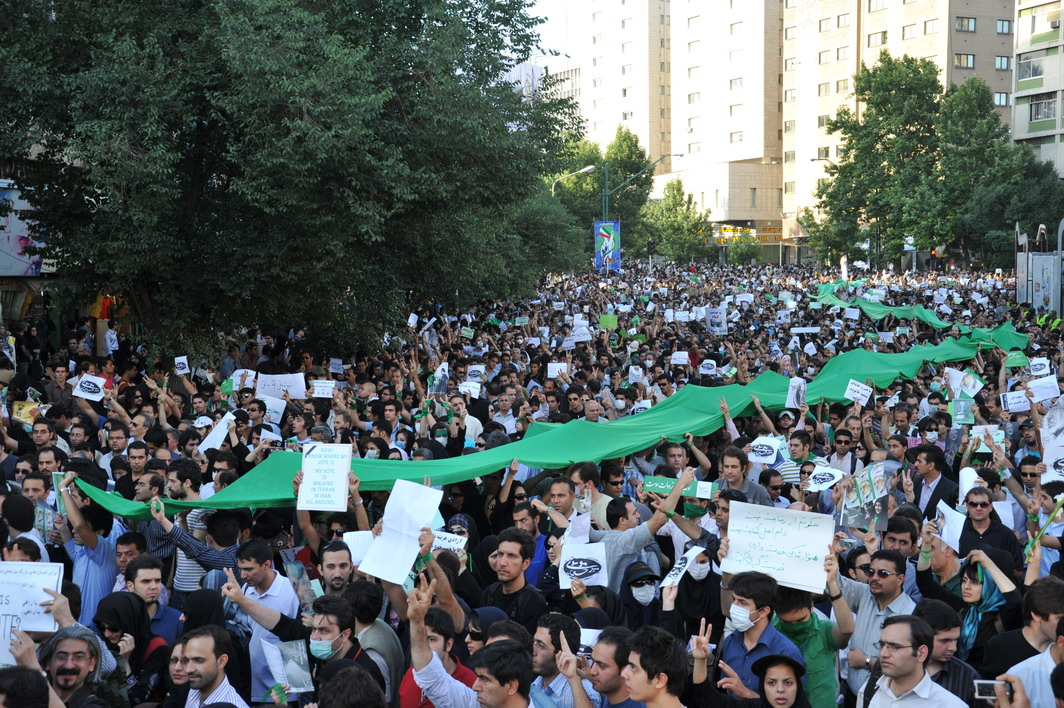
Protesters in Tehran carrying a long green textile as a sign of Iranian Green Movement, 16 June

Following the re-election of President Mahmoud Ahmadinejad in 2009, protests concerning the validity of the vote and the possibility of voter-fraud broke out that led to thousands of arrests and close to a hundred deaths. During these protests, which became known as the Iranian Green Movement, the theme of martyrdom was reclaimed by anti-government protestors as a form of "secular martyrdom." Activists in the 2009 green revolution began calling those killed during protests "martyrs." One important example is Neda Agha-Soltan a young student who was shot to death during a protest. A video of her death spread throughout the world, and her image became a symbol of resistance used to gain international political support. The fact that her name, Neda, means voice or calling in Persian, was also important, because it represented a call to martyrdom for the cause.

== Javidnam ==
Javidnam is a Persian term formed from the words javid (eternal) and nam (name), signifying an individual whose name and memory are regarded as everlasting. Unlike shahid—a term rooted in Islamic jurisprudence or theology—this word is best categorized alongside contemporary Persian honorifics and commemorative titles rather than Islamic invocations or prayers.

In contemporary Persian, "Javidnam" can precede a person's name to honor the deceased—particularly those whose deaths are linked to a political, social, or national cause. While it sometimes serves as a functional substitute for shahid, it lacks the latter's explicit religious connotations. Lexicographical sources define "Javidnam" as "one whose name is remembered forever," while also noting its usage—in certain contexts—to denote a "shahid."

The political and commemorative use of this term has gained prominence in Iran in recent years. For instance, in reports concerning those killed during protests, families and opposition groups have applied the title "Javidnam" to some of the deceased; conversely, reports have emerged of authorities preventing the inscription of this term on their tombstones. Thus, "Javidnam" represents the emergence of a new Persian honorific and commemorative title that fulfills some of the traditional functions of "shahid" without necessarily implying the religious definition of martyrdom.
