= Dewan Yousuf Farooqui =

Pakistani politician

Muhammad Yousuf Farooqui
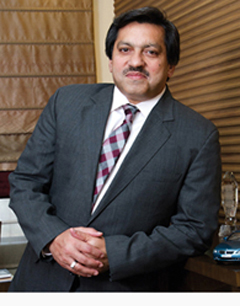

Sindh Finance Minister
- In office 2007–2007

Personal details
- Born: Karachi
- Occupation: Politician; Businessman

Dewan Muhammad Yousuf Farooqui is a Pakistani businessman and former Sindh finance minister who is the owner of Yousuf Dewan Companies. He has also served as the Provincial Minister for the Local Bodies. Industries, Labour, Transport, Mines and Minerals of Sindh from 1999 to 2004.

== Political career ==
Farooqui was the Provincial Minister for the Local Bodies. Industries, Labour, Transport, Mines & Minerals of Sindh from 1999 to 2003 during Musharraf regime. In March 2005, he was awarded the Sitara-i-Imtiaz by then President of Pakistan Pervez Musharraf.

Farooqui was made the Provincial Finance Minister in the caretaker setup in Sindh in 2007.
