= Jewish views on suicide =

Jewish views on suicide are mixed. In Orthodox Judaism, suicide is forbidden by Halakha, and viewed as a sin. Non-Orthodox forms of Judaism may instead recognize the act as more akin to a death by a disease or disorder (except in cases of purposeful assisted suicide). Rabbinical scholars command compassion both for the deceased and the survivors.

== Terminology ==
Hebrew: מאבד עצמו לדעת, lit. 'Losing oneself in knowledge' is a Halakhic term for a person who seeks to commit suicide. Such an act is considered a severe prohibition.

== Assisted suicide ==
Assisting in suicide and requesting such assistance (thereby creating an accomplice to a sinful act) is also forbidden, a minimal violation of Leviticus 19:14, "Do not put a stumbling block before the blind", for the rabbis interpreted that verse to prohibit any type of stumbling block: theological (e. g., persuading people to believe in false doctrine), economic (e. g., giving bad financial advice), or in this case moral stumbling blocks, as well as physical ones.

== Talmudic sources ==
The prohibition against suicide is mentioned in the Talmud in Tractate Bava Kama 91b. Semahot (Evel Rabbati) 2:1–5 serves as the basis for most of later Jewish law on suicide, together with Genesis Rabbah 34:13, which bases the biblical prohibition on Genesis 9:5: "And surely your blood of your lives, will I require".

== Committee on Jewish Law and Standards ==
The Committee on Jewish Law and Standards, the body of scholars of Jewish law in Conservative Judaism, has published a responsa on suicide and assisted suicide in the Summer 1998 issue of Conservative Judaism, Vol. L, No. 4. It affirms the prohibition, then addresses the growing trend of Americans and Europeans to seek assistance with suicide. The Conservative teshuva notes that while many people get sick, often with terminal illnesses, most people do not try to kill themselves. The committee believes we are obliged to determine why some seek help with suicide and to ameliorate those circumstances.

The Conservative response states:

"... those who commit suicide and those who aid others in doing so act out of a plethora of motives. Some of these reasons are less than noble, involving, for example, children's desires to see Mom or Dad die with dispatch so as not to squander their inheritance on 'futile' health care, or the desire of insurance companies to spend as little money as possible on the terminally ill."

The paper says the proper response to severe pain is not suicide, but better pain control and more pain medication. Many doctors, it asserts, are deliberately keeping such patients in pain by refusing to administer sufficient pain medications: some out of ignorance; others to avoid possible drug addiction; others from a misguided sense of stoicism. Conservative Judaism holds that such forms of reasoning are "bizarre" and cruel, that with today's medications there is no reason for people to be in perpetual torture.

== Collective suicides in Jewish history ==
Judaism has many teachings about peace and compromise that present physical violence as one of the last possible options. Although killing oneself is forbidden under normal Jewish law as being a denial of God's goodness in the world, under extreme circumstances, when there has seemed no choice but to either be killed or forced to betray their religion, Jews have committed suicide or mass suicide (see Masada, First French persecution of the Jews, and York Castle for examples).

== Views on martyrdom ==
As a grim reminder of those times, there is even a prayer in the Jewish liturgy for "when the knife is at the throat", for those dying "to sanctify God's Name". (See: martyrdom). These acts have received mixed responses by Jewish authorities; some regard them as examples of heroic martyrdom, and others saying that while Jews should always be willing to face martyrdom if necessary, it was wrong for them to have taken their own lives.

== See also ==
- He who loses himself in knowledge has no share in the world to come (Hebrew: המאבד עצמו לדעת אין לו חלק לעולם הבא)
- Let me die with the Philistines (Hebrew: תמות נפשי עם פלשתים)
- Martyrdom in Judaism
- Self-sacrifice in Jewish law
- Kiddush Hashem
- Olei Hagardom
