= Shaheed Benazir Bhutto Dewan University =

- شہید بینظیر بھُٹو دیوان یونیورسٹی
- Type: Private
- Established: 2013
- Affiliations: Yousuf Dewan Companies, Higher Education Commission (Pakistan), Pharmacy Council of Pakistan
- Chancellor: Dewan Mohammad Yousuf Farooqui
- Vice-Chancellor: Dr. Aurangzeb Khan
- Location: Karachi, Sindh, Pakistan
- Nickname: SBBDU
- Website: sbbdewanuniversity.edu.pk

The Shaheed Benazir Bhutto Dewan University (SBBDU) (Urdu: شہید بینظیر بھُٹو دیوان یونیورسٹی) is a private university located in Karachi, Sindh, Pakistan. The university was established in 2013 It is recognized by the Higher Education Commission (Pakistan). SBBDU is a part of Yousuf Dewan Companies.

== Programs ==
- DPT
- PPDPT
- BBA
- ADP(Business Administration)
- BEd
- BSCS
- PharmD
- MSCS
- MEd
- MBA
- Executive MBA
- PhD Management Sciences
- PhD Health Management
