= Mohtarma Benazir Bhutto Shaheed Medical College =

Mohtarma Benazir Bhutto Shaheed Medical College محترمہ بینظیر بھٹو شہید طبی کالج
- Type: Public sector
- Established: 2012
- Founders: Chaudhry Abdul Majeed (former Prime Minister, AJK)
- Affiliations: Pakistan Medical and Dental Council; College of Physicians and Surgeons of Pakistan; University of Health Sciences, Lahore
- Principal: Faisal Bashir
- Location: Mirpur, Azad Kashmir
- Language: English; Urdu

Mohtarma Benazir Bhutto Shaheed Medical College MBBSMC (Urdu: محترما بینظیر بھٹو شہید طبی کالج) is a medical college located in Mirpur, Azad Kashmir.

It is a government-funded medical college and the selection is on the basis of merit. The college is recognized by the Pakistan Medical Commission. This medical college was established in 2012.

== Affiliated Teaching Hospitals ==
Teaching hospitals

- New city Teaching Hospital, Mirpur
- The DHQ Teaching Hospital along with KIC, is currently providing the practice facility for the students. It is a 400 bedded hospital with various departments.

== Recognitions ==
The college is affiliated and recognized by the following Organizations and Institutes :

- Pakistan Medical and Dental Council
- Pakistan Medical Commission
- University of Health Sciences
- International Medical Education Directory
- College of Physicians and Surgeons
- University of Azad Jammu and Kashmir

== See also ==
- List of institutions of higher education in Azad Kashmir
- Pakistan Medical and Dental Council
