= Shaheed Benazir Bhutto University, Sheringal =

University in Pakistan

Shaheed Benazir Bhutto University جامعہ شہید بینظیر بھٹو
- Other name: SBBU
- Type: Public University
- Established: 2009
- Chancellor: Governor of Khyber Pakhtunkhwa
- Vice-Chancellor: Muhammad Shahab
- Location: Upper Dir, Khyber Pakhtunkhwa, Pakistan
- Campus: Urban
- Website: www.sbbu.edu.pk

Shaheed Benazir Bhutto University (SBBU) (Urdu: جامعہ شہید بینظیر بھٹو) is a public university located in the Sheringal region within the Upper Dir District of the Khyber Pakhtunkhwa province of Pakistan. It was established in 2009 with a presidential order. The university was established by upgrading the sub-campus of the University of Malakand having Forestry department and Phytochemistry laboratories. Ms Shazia Khushdil, Mr. Khansher, Ms, Shazia Ahmad and Mr Naveed Anjum were the pioneers of sub-campus and the only forestry department was there along with the University Public School and College and a project on medicinal plant. Ms Shazia Khushdil and Ms Shazia Ahmad are the first women in the history of Dir Upper who started university education in Dir Upper.. This is because of them that later in 2009, it became Shaheed Benazir Bhutto University Sheringal, Dir upper. Mr. Badshah Hussain was the first registrar and Dr Jahandar Shah was its first Vice Chancellor. The university provides degrees in various subjects including Computer Science, Pharmacy, Geology, Forestry, Chemistry and Biotechnology.

== History and background ==
In 2001, the University of Malakand was established in the Lower Dir district. But sensing the need of the people of Dir Upper, the then Governor of Khyber Pakhtunkhwa issued directives on 3 October 2002 for the establishment of Campus-II of the Malakand University at the Sheringal region in Upper Dir. General (Rt) Syed Iftikhar Hussain Shah formally inaugurated the campus-II to enable the people to get a better education at their doorstep. Sheringal Campus became a full-fledged University "Shaheed Benazir Bhutto University" on 6 October 2009, under the Regulation 2009, recommended by his Excellencies, the Governor Khyber PakhtunKhwa and approved by the President of the Islamic Republic of Pakistan.

The university is located in Sheringal, the administrative headquarter and business hub of the valley of Dir Kohistan, on the bank of Panjkora River at a distance of about 35 km from Dir city and 25 km from the Chukiyatan bridge.

== See also ==
- University of Malakand
- Abdul Wali Khan University
- Swat University
- Kohat University of Science and Technology
