= Shohada =

Shohada (Persian: شهدا, plural form of shahid 'martyr') may refer to:

== Places ==
- Shohada, Fars, or Eshkaft, Iran
- Shohada, Lorestan, or Gari Babakhan, Iran
- Shohada, Yazd, Iran

== Other uses ==
- Shohada Mosque, in Tabriz, Iran
- Al Shohada Mosque (Sanaa), Yemen
- Shohada Square, Tehran, a square in Tehran, Iran
- Shohada Square, Shiraz, a square in Shiraz, Iran
- Shohada square project, in Mashhad, Iran
- Shohada Stadium, in Noshahr, Iran

== See also ==
- Shahid (disambiguation)
- Shohada Metro Station (disambiguation)
- Shohada Rural District (disambiguation)
