= Shahed =

Shahed may refer to:

== Places ==
- Shahid, Fars, or Shahed, Iran,
- Shahed - Bagher Shahr Metro Station, in Tehran County, Iran
- Shahed Metro Station (Shiraz), Iran

== Other uses ==
- Shahd, or Shahed or Shahad, a given name
- Shahed Aviation Industries, an Iranian aerospace company
  - Shahed drones
- Shahed University, in Tehran, Iran

== See also ==
- Shahid (disambiguation)
