= Shahid (disambiguation) =

Shahid denotes a martyr in Islam and amongst Hindus and Sikhs in India.

Shahid or Shaheed may also refer to:

== People ==
- Shahid (name), including a list of people with the name
- Shahid (actor) (Shahid Hameed, born 1950), Pakistani film actor

== Places ==
- Shahid, Fars, Iran
- Shahid, Isfahan, Iran
- Shahid, Markazi, Iran
- Shaheed Nagar metro station, on the Delhi Metro in India
- Shaheed Sthal metro station, on the Delhi Metro in India

== Film ==
- Shaheed (1948 film), an Indian Hindi-language romance film
- Shaheed (1962 film), a Pakistani music blockbuster
- Shaheed (1965 film), an Indian film based on the life of Bhagat Singh
- 23rd March 1931: Shaheed, a 2002 Indian film about Bhagat Singh
- Shahid (film), a 2012 Indian film about Shahid Azmi
- Martyr (2017 film), or Shaheed, a Lebanese film

== Other uses ==
- Shadid, an Islamophobic trope#Shahid
- Shahid (Algeria), a person who fell during the Algerian War in the ranks of the independence movement
- Ash-Shaheed, one of the names of God in Islam

== See also ==
- All pages with titles containing Shahid
- All pages with titles containing Shaheed
- Shahd, or Shahed or Shahad, a given name
- Shahed (disambiguation)
- Shahida (disambiguation)
- Shahadat (disambiguation)
- Shahada (disambiguation)
- Shohada (disambiguation)
- Shaheed Minar
- Martyrdom in Islam
- Martyrdom in Sikhism
- Martyr
