= Shahid (name) =

- Gender: Male
- Language: Arabic

Origin
- Meaning: Witness in Arabic and Beloved in Persian
- Region of origin: South Asia, Middle East

Other names
- Alternative spelling: Shaheed
- Related names: Shahida

Shahid also pronounced Shaheed (Arabic: شاہد šhahid) is a given name translating to 'Witness' in Arabic and 'Beloved' in Persian, mostly found in South Asia.

It is derived from the root Arabic: ش ه د, romanized: š-h-d (Note: The dictionary definition of شهد#Arabic at Wiktionary) (cf. Shahada).

Shahid is a male Muslim name and Arabic in origin. The name is common in Asian countries such as Pakistan, India, Bangladesh and Afghanistan.

It is not to be confused with a different word, a religious term, written and pronounced differently, Shahid (Arabic: شهيد, romanized: shahid, plural شُهَدَاء šuhadā, female Arabic: شهيدة, romanized: šaheeda), meaning 'martyr'.

== People named Shahid ==
=== Given name ===
- Shahid Khaqan Abbasi (born 1958), politician and former Prime Minister of Pakistan
- Shahid Afridi (born 1980), Pakistani cricketer
- Shahid Ahmed (born 1988), Pakistani footballer
- Shahid Ahmed (cricketer) (born 1975), cricket player
- Shahid Azmi (1977–2010), Indian lawyer and human rights activist
- Shaheed Kader, Indian film director
- Shahid Kapoor (born 1981), Bollywood actor
- Shahid Khan (disambiguation), multiple people
- Shaheed Latif (1913–1967), Indian film producer
- Shahid Parvez Khan (born 1955), Indian sitar player
- Shaied Nazir (born 1980), convicted of the racially motivated murder of Ross Parker
- Shahid Mahmood (1939–2020), Pakistani cricketer

=== Stage name ===
- Shahid (actor) (born 1950), Pakistani actor active from 1971 to 1998

=== Surname ===
- Abdulla Shahid (born 1962), Maldivian MP
- Imran Shahid, ringleader of gang responsible for the racially motivated murder of Kriss Donald in Scotland
- Leila Shahid (1949–2026), Palestinian diplomat
- Mohammed Shahid (1960–2016), Indian field hockey player
- Munib Shahid (1908–1973), Chairman of Hematology and Oncology at the Faculty of Medicine of the American University of Beirut
- Rashid Shaheed (born 1998), American football player
- Serene Husseini Shahid (1920–2008), writer, promoter of Palestinian costumes.
- Zeeshan Shahid, convicted of the racially motivated murder of Kriss Donald in Scotland

== Legendary figures ==
- Shahid ibn Jarr (Shehid ibn Jerr), the name for Seth in Yezidism

== See also ==
- Shahidi (surname)
- Shahida (feminine name)
- Shahid (disambiguation), also covers Shaheed
- All pages beginning with Shaheed
- All pages beginning with Shahid
