= Human rights in Pahlavi Iran =

Pahlavi Iran, the Iranian state under the Pahlavi dynasty, lasted from 1925 to 1979. During that time two monarchs—Reza Shah Pahlavi and his son Mohammad Reza Shah Pahlavi—employed secret police, torture, and executions to stifle political dissent. According to historian Ervand Abrahamian, the use of torture by the state in Iran, abuse of prisoners varied at times during the Pahlavi reign. During the mid-1970s, international observers considered the Pahlavi regime to have the worst human rights record of any country at the time. While the monarchical government's use of torture was widespread, such contemporary assessments were shaped by greater information access and advocacy campaigns; overall political fatalities under the last Pahlavi monarch were far smaller in scale than those in contemporary closed regimes.

== Reza Shah ==
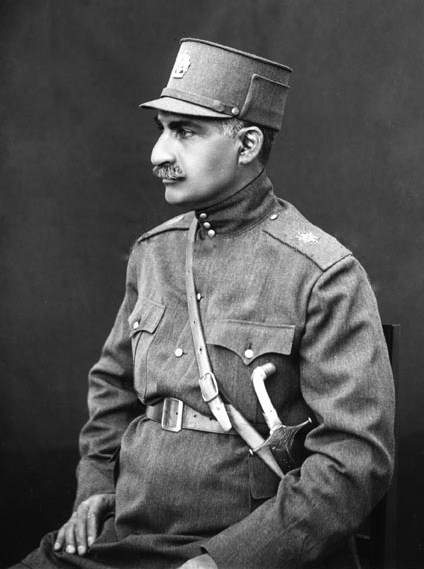
Reza Shah, founder of the Pahlavi dynasty

The reign of Reza Shah was authoritarian and dictatorial at a time when authoritarian governments and dictatorships were common in the world and standard for the region.

Free press, workers' rights, and political expression were restricted and limited under Reza Shah. Independent newspapers were often closed down and political parties were banned; as were all trade unions, with 150 labor organizers arrested between 1927 and 1932 but it is also mentioned that some of these press were moving against the national security of the country and therefore their activity had to be either restricted or banned.

Physical force was used against some kinds of prisoners — common criminals, suspected spies, and those accused of plotting regicide. Burglars in particular were subjected to the bastinado (beating the soles of the feet), and the strappado (being suspended in the air by means of a rope tied around the victims arms) to "reveal their hidden loot". Suspected spies and assassins were "beaten, deprived of sleep, and subjected to the qapani" (the binding of arms tightly behind the back) which sometimes caused a joint to crack. But for political prisoners — who were primarily Communists — there was a "conspicuous absence of torture" under Reza Shah's rule. The main form of pressure was solitary confinement and the withholding of "books, newspapers, visitors, food packages, and proper medical care". While often threatened with the qapani, political prisoners "were rarely subjected to it."

Reza Shah's reign was often accused of violating freedom of religion and suppressing pious Muslims. In one notable incident, he violated the sanctity of the Fatima Masumeh Shrine to beat a cleric who had accused his wife, Queen Tadj ol-Molouk, of immodesty when during her pilgrimage she wore a veil which did not cover her completely and showed her face. Reza Shah passed a law requiring everyone (except Shia jurisconsults who had passed a special qualifying examination) to wear Western clothes, and forbid women teachers to come to school with head coverings. Public mourning observances were restricted to one day, and mosques required to use chairs for mourners to sit on during observances, instead of the mourner's traditional sitting on the floors of mosques.

By the mid-1930s, these decrees, confiscation of clerical land holdings, and other problems had caused intense dissatisfaction among the Shi'a clergy throughout Iran. In the 1935 Goharshad Mosque rebellion, a crowd gathered in support of a cleric at the Imam Reza shrine in Mashhad and denounced the Shah's innovations, corruption and heavy consumer taxes. Troops were called in and dozens of protestors were killed and hundreds injured.

In 1936 and following this incident, the Shah went further and issued the Kashf-e hijab, banning the chador and ordering all citizens—rich and poor—to bring their wives to public functions without head coverings.

=== 1953 ===
The 1953 coup against Prime Minister Mohammad Mosaddegh brought major changes to press freedom. Within weeks, newspapers that supported Mosaddegh and left-wing newspapers were banned. Printing presses were seized, and many journalists and editors were arrested or forced to leave the country. In 1955, a new Press Act introduced strict rules for newspapers, editors, and writers. Breaking these rules could lead to fines, imprisonment, or the loss of publishing licenses. The law banned criticism of the royal family, the publication of information considered false, the release of military secrets, and content considered harmful to Islam.

=== State-enforced unveiling ===
In January 1936, Reza Shah introduced a policy banning women from wearing the veil in public as part of his efforts to modernize society and reduce religious influence. The policy was officially announced on 8 January 1936 at a ceremony at Tehran Teachers’ College, where the shah appeared with his wife and daughters without veils. The government then enforced the ban across the country. Some educated and middle-class women welcomed the change because they believed it would help women take a greater role in public life. However, many religious and conservative people strongly opposed the policy. According to Encyclopaedia Iranica, the government used force to enforce the ban, and many women continued to see the veil as an important part of their religious beliefs and social identity.

The policy affected more than just women's clothing. Women who continued to wear the veil could face restrictions on going out in public. Some avoided public places during the later years of Reza Shah's rule. In Isfahan, for example, reports stated that many women stayed at home until the policy stopped being enforced after Reza Shah left power in 1941. As a result, the policy allowed some women to take part in public life while limiting the freedom of others to follow their own religious and cultural traditions.

== Mohammad Reza Shah ==
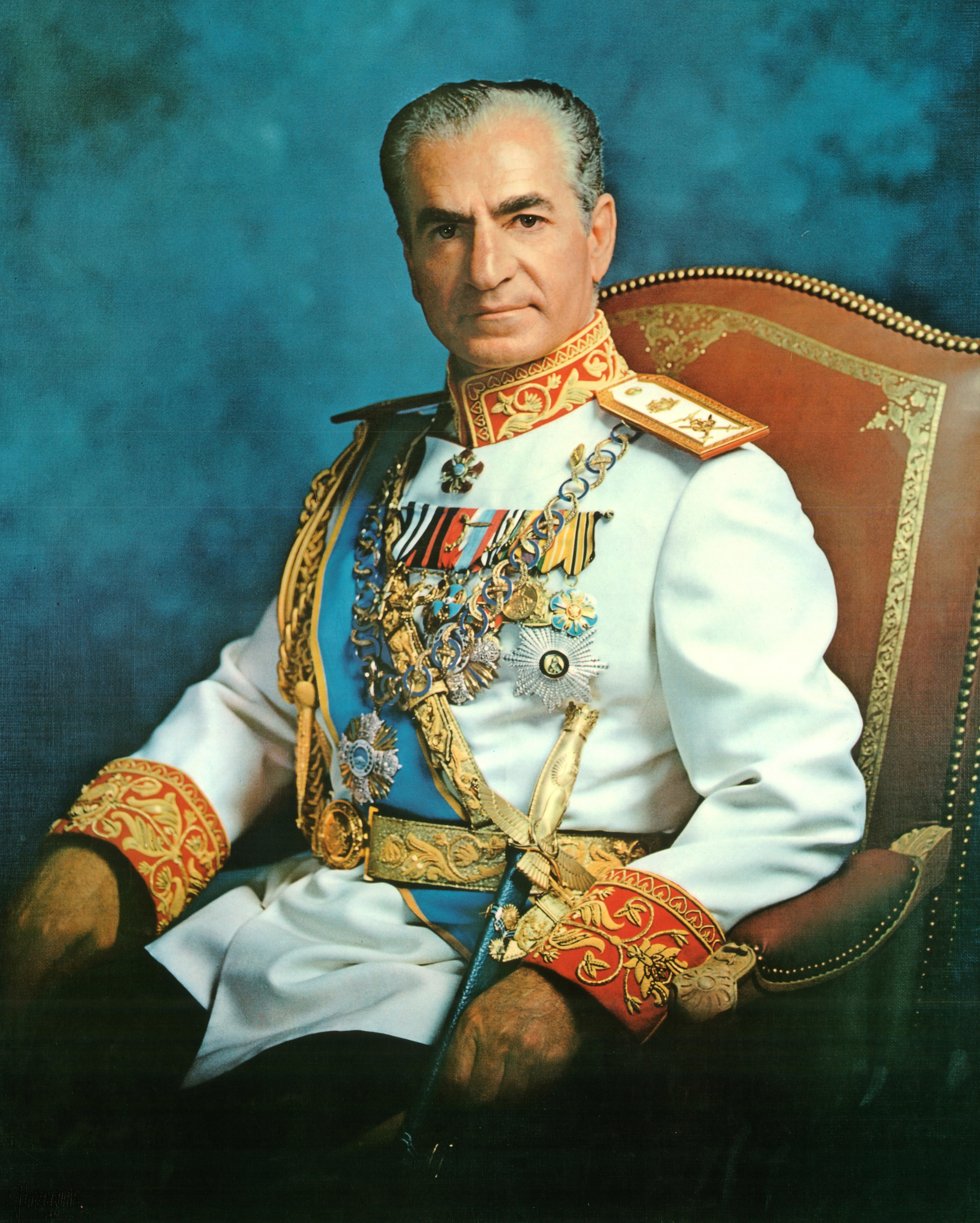
Mohammad Reza Pahlavi, the second ruling shah of the Pahlavi dynasty

Mohammad Reza Shah became monarch after his father was deposed by the Anglo-Soviet invasion of Iran in 1941. Political prisoners (mostly Communists) were released by the occupying powers, and the Shah (Crown Prince at the time) no longer had control of the parliament. But after an attempted assassination of the Shah in 1949, he was able to declare martial law, imprison communists and other opponents, and restrict criticism of the Royal family in the press.

Following the pro-Shah coup d'état that overthrew Prime Minister Mohammad Mosaddegh in 1953, the Shah again cracked down on his opponents, and political freedom waned. He outlawed Mosaddegh's political group, the National Front, and arrested most of its leaders. Over 4000 political activists of the Tudeh party were arrested, (including 477 in the armed forces), forty were executed, another 14 died under torture and over 200 were sentenced to life imprisonment and the most common crimes of this groups were being connected to anti-national groups and communist activities.

Following this crackdown, conditions for political prisoners and opponents of the authoritarian government were relatively good for many years. "The bulk of Tudeh prisoners were released," and the remaining prisoners who refused to sign letters of regret were allowed to play ping pong, use a gymnasium, and watch television. In the 1960s, the Shah also introduced electoral reforms expanding suffrage to women and the ability to hold office to non-Muslims, as part of a broader series of reforms dubbed the White Revolution.

One exception to this relative calm was three days of rioting starting 5 June 1963 after Ayatollah Ruhollah Khomeini—a leading opponent of the White Revolution on religious grounds—was arrested. Troops fired on demonstrators in Jaleh Square killing 64 to 94 people, not including those who did not go to hospital "for fear of arrest", or who were taken to the morgue or buried by security forces.

During the 1970s, international organizations reported on political prisoners, military and special courts, limits on civil and political rights, and allegations that SAVAK systematically used torture. In 1976, the International Commission of Jurists studied Iran’s legal system. It recognized progress in economic and social rights under the White Revolution but also reported serious problems with civil and political rights.

The reforms also had mixed effects. Under Reza Shah, the government encouraged women's education and public participation but made unveiling compulsory in 1936. This meant the state controlled women's appearance and social roles instead of allowing women to make their own choices. Under Mohammad Reza Shah, further reforms gave women more legal rights, including greater citizenship rights and changes to family law. However, these reforms were introduced under an authoritarian government. Overall, the Pahlavi period significantly changed women's legal and social status, but major inequalities based on class, location, and social background continued to affect their daily lives.

=== 1971–1976 ===
However, in 1971 a guerrilla attack on a gendarmerie post (where three police were killed and two guerrillas freed, known as the "Siahkal incident") sparked "an intense guerrilla struggle" against the government, who responded with harsh countermeasures. Inspired by international Third World revolutionaries (such as Mao Zedong, Ho Chi Minh, and Che Guevara, among many others), left-wing guerrillas embraced "armed struggle" to overthrow the Shah, and were quite active in the first half of the 1970s. Hundreds of them died in clashes with government forces and dozens of Iranians were executed. According to Amnesty International, the Shah carried out at least 300 political executions.

According to a senior SAVAK officer, after the Siahkal attack interrogators were sent abroad for scientific training to prevent unwanted deaths from "brute force".` Methods of torture included sleep deprivation; extensive solitary confinement; glaring searchlights; standing in one place for hours on end; nail extractions; snakes (favored for use with women); electrical shocks with cattle prods, often into the rectum; cigarette burns; sitting on hot grills; acid dripped into nostrils; near-drownings; mock executions; and an electric chair with a large metal mask to muffle screams. Prisoners were also humiliated by being raped, urinated on, and forced to stand naked. However, the torture method of choice remained the traditional bastinado used to beat the soles of the feet.

Torture was used to locate arms caches, safe houses and accomplices of the guerrillas, but another incident in 1971 led to the use of torture of political prisoners for another purpose. In 1971, a prisoner, Parviz Nikkhah, serving a ten-year prison sentence for communist subversion "experienced a genuine change of heart." He "astounded" the public by coming out in full support of the regime, starting a career working for the government Radio-Television Network" explaining how the Shah was a "true revolutionary". So impressed was the regime with this conversion and its impact, it "did not take it long to go one step further and `induce` other `conversions.`" By the end of 1975, twenty-two prominent poets, novelist, professors, theater directors, and film makers were in jail for criticizing the regime. And many others had been physically attacked for refusing to cooperate with the authorities.

The nature of this torture was "infinitely worse" than torture for information, which being time sensitive, lost its function and was discontinued after a short period of time.

In 1975, the human rights group Amnesty International — whose membership and international influence grew greatly during the 1970s — issued a report on treatment of political prisoners in Iran that was "extensively covered in the European and American Press".

=== 1976–1977 ===
By 1976, this repression was softened considerably thanks to publicity and scrutiny by "numerous international organizations and foreign newspapers." In 1976, Jimmy Carter was elected President of the United States and he "raised the issue of human rights in Iran as well as in the Soviet Union. Overnight prison conditions changed", and the Shah ordered an end to torture.

=== Islamic Revolution ===
During the 1978–79 overthrow of the Pahlavi government, protestors were fired upon by troops. The real and imaginary human rights violations contributed directly to the Shah's demise, (although some have argued so did his scruples in not violating human rights more as urged by his generals).

The 1977 deaths of the popular and influential modernist Islamist leader Ali Shariati and the Ayatollah Ruhollah Khomeini's son Mostafa were believed to be assassinations perpetrated by the SAVAK by many Iranians. Later it became evident that his death was due to heart attack. On 8 September 1978 (Black Friday), troops fired on religious demonstrators in Jaleh Square (now Martyrs' Square). The clerical leadership announced that "thousands have been massacred by Zionist troops" (i.e. rumored Israeli troops aiding the Shah), Michel Foucault reported 4000 had been killed, and another European journalist reported that the military left behind "carnage." Post-revolutionary accounting by Emadeddin Baghi, of the government Foundation of Martyrs and Veterans Affairs, found 94 people killed on Black Friday: 64 (including two women) in Jaleh Square, and 30 (including one woman) in other parts of the capital.

=== Later analysis ===
Historians' evaluations of Shah's human rights record have been kinder than contemporary accounts. An estimated 380, not 15,000 demonstrators were killed during the June 1963 demonstrations in Iran, some of them armed. A report commissioned (but not published) by the Martyrs Foundation found the total killed in clashes between demonstrators and the Shah's army/security forces during the 14 months from October 1977 to February 1979 to be not 60,000 but 2781. In reference to the "60,000" figure, the military historian Spencer C. Tucker notes that "Khomeini's regime grossly overstated the revolution's death toll for propaganda purposes". Tucker explains that the consensus of historians regarding estimated deaths during the Iranian Revolution (from January 1978 to February 1979), numbers between 532 and 2,781.

Instead of thousands killed by Israeli mercenaries in Jaleh Square on Black Friday, it now appears 64 to 94 were killed by troops who were Iranian but from a Kurdish region (speaking Kurdish not Hebrew). According to the historian Abbas Amanat:

The clerical activists, backed by the Qom marja's, capitalized on the Jaleh Square massacre to paint the regime as brutal and illegitimate. Aided by a rumor-mongering machine that became fully operational in the absence of reliable media and news reporting, the number of casualties, the “martyrs” on the path of Islam, was inflated to thousands, and the troops who opened fire on them were labeled as Israeli mercenaries who were brought in to crush the revolution.

Tucker writes that 94 were killed on Black Friday, of which 64 were protesters and 30 were government security forces. The Iranologist Richard Foltz, likewise, mentions that 64 protesters died at Jaleh Square.

Johann Beukes, author of Foucault in Iran, 1978–1979, notes that "Foucault seems to have adhered to this exaggerated death count at Djaleh Square, propagated by the revolting masses themselves. Thousands were wounded, but the death toll on both sides unlikely accounted to hundred casualties".

After the revolution, domestic surveillance and espionage, the use of torture for public recantations was not abolished but expanded. SAVAK was replaced by a "much larger" SAVAMA, (later renamed the Ministry of Intelligence). The political historian Ervand Abrahamian puts the Islamic Republic of Iran in the same "league" as "Stalinist Russia, Maoist China, and [the Inquisition of] early modern Europe", in "their systematic use" of torture to produce public recantations by political prisoners.

According to Akbar Ganji, "notions of democracy and human rights have taken root among the Iranian people" making it "much more difficult for the government to commit crimes." Writing about the reform period during the presidency of Mohammad Khatami Iranian-American academic Arzoo Osanloo notes that, "liberal notions of rights are almost hegemonic in Iran today." And Majd himself explains the Islamic Republic's relative tolerance by claiming that if Iranian intelligence services "were to arrest anyone who speaks ill of the government in private, they simply couldn't build cells fast enough to hold their prisoners."

== Freedom of the press and expression ==
Press freedom changed greatly during the Pahlavi period. Under Reza Shah, the government gradually took direct control of newspapers and other publications. By the end of his rule, the number of Persian-language publications had greatly decreased, and the government strictly censored newspapers under police supervision. Editors could lose their licenses or be sent to prison if they published anything that criticized or displeased the government.

== Other related matters ==
The creation of SAVAK in 1957 gave the government another way to control newspapers and publishers. During the 1960s, censorship became more organized and widespread. It affected not only newspapers but also books, universities, and intellectuals, limiting their ability to freely discuss political and social issues.

By the 1970s, press restrictions remained in place, even though many newspapers were privately owned. U.S. diplomatic reports from the time showed that editors were careful because they feared pressure from the government and SAVAK. Other reports also described growing limits on political discussion. The number of newspapers had fallen significantly since the early 1950s, despite population growth and rising literacy. This shows that private ownership did not guarantee freedom of the press or protect newspapers from censorship and political pressure.

Despite restrictions on independent organization, labor disputes did not disappear. According to a study cited by Encyclopaedia Iranica, 140 strikes occurred between 1970 and 1977, with 83 percent taking place in industrial establishments employing at least 100 workers. About 70 percent of these strikes were peaceful, and workers' demands were met in more than half of the reported cases. The persistence of strikes indicates that state control over unions did not eliminate collective labor action, although the scale and organization of such activity varied considerably across industries and periods.

In the early 1960s, Mohammad Reza Shah introduced the White Revolution. It included land reform, government control of forests and pastures, profit-sharing for industrial workers, and programs to improve education, health care, and rural life. These reforms greatly changed Iran’s society and economy. However, the benefits were unequal, and the reforms also involved government force, political opposition, and major changes in land ownership and rural communities.

=== Workers' rights and trade unions ===
During the Pahlavi period, workers' unions went through major changes. Under Reza Shah, the government suppressed independent unions and imprisoned union leaders and their supporters. After he left power in 1941, unions grew quickly, especially under the influence of the Tudeh Party. By 1946, the United Central Council of Trade Unions claimed to represent about 300,000 workers. Unions helped organize strikes and political activities in major industrial cities such as Tehran, Isfahan, and Abadan. Later, union activities faced new restrictions. During Mohammad Mosaddegh's government, unions became active again, but the 1953 coup brought another turning point.

After the 1953 coup, workers were once again prevented from forming independent trade unions. Between 1953 and 1962, only about 30 officially registered unions were active, making this a difficult period for the labor movement. In 1963, the government allowed unions to form under the supervision of the Ministry of Labor. Their number grew from 16 in 1964 to 519 in 1972. However, these unions remained under government control. In 1967, the government created the Workers' Organization of Iran to bring these unions together, further limiting workers' ability to organize independently of the state.

== See also ==
- Corruption in Pahlavi Iran
