= Shtick =

Comic theme or gimmick

A shtick is a comic theme or gimmick. The word is borrowed from the Yiddish term שטיק (shtik), making it related to German Stück, Polish sztuka, and Russian штука (štúka), all ultimately from Proto-Germanic: *stukkiją, all meaning 'piece', 'thing', or 'theatre play'. Compare Theaterstück is the German word for 'play' (and is a synonym of Schauspiel, lit. 'viewing play', in contrast to Singspiel).‍

The English word piece is sometimes used in a similar context: for example, "a musical piece". In a stand-up comedy context, a near-equivalent term is a "bit". Another variant is "bits of business" or just "bits". Shtick may refer to an adopted persona, usually for comedy performances, that is maintained consistently (though not necessarily exclusively) across the performer's career. In this usage, the recurring personalities adopted by Laurel and Hardy through all of their many comedy films—although they often played characters with different names and occupations—would qualify as their shtick. A comedian might maintain several different shticks of this sort, particularly if appearing in a variety show encouraging development of multiple characters, such as Saturday Night Live.

In common usage, the word shtick has also come to mean any talent, style, habit, or other eccentricity for which a person is particularly well-known, even if not intended for comedic purposes. For example, a person who is known locally for an ability to eat dozens of hot dogs quickly might say that it was his shtick. Among Orthodox Jews, "shtick" can also refer to wedding shtick, in which wedding guests entertain the newlyweds through dancing, costumes, juggling, and silliness.

Because of its roots in show business, shtick has taken on the connotation of a contrived and often-used act. For this reason, journalists and commentators often apply the word disparagingly to stock replies from politicians.‍

== See also ==
- Trope
- List of English words of Yiddish origin
