= Shahadat =

Shahadat is the given name of:

- Shahadat Hossain, a Bangladeshi cricketer
- Shahadat Hussain, a Bengali poet and writer
- Shahadat Hossain Khan, a Bangladeshi musician
- Muhammad Shahdaat Bin Sayeed, a Bangladeshi young scientist

== See also ==
- Shahada (disambiguation)
- Shahid (disambiguation)
- Kalma (disambiguation)
