= Rhetorical figure =

Rhetorical figure may refer to:

- Figure of speech
- Rhetorical device
- Literary trope
