= Criticism of kashrut =

Criticism of kashrut is criticism of or opposition to Jewish dietary law or dislike of kosher foods (foods deemed acceptable by Jewish law). Some criticism comes from non-Jews, some from Jews who don't keep kosher, and it may or may not be motivated by antisemitism. In some European countries, kosher slaughter is banned or restricted by law, often because nationalists or animal rights activists object to the practice. Jews who keep kosher reject allegations that certain aspects of kashrut promote sectarianism or racism. Right-wing extremists sometimes criticize kashrut due to their belief in antisemitic canards and antisemitic conspiracy theories. In Classical Reform Judaism, the keeping of kosher has been discouraged as an unhelpful vestige of the past. In the Soviet Union, the keeping of Kosher was discouraged by anti-religious and antisemitic policies of the Soviet government and the anti-religious views of secular Jewish Communists.

== Examples ==
=== Non-Jewish criticism ===
Several countries in Europe and Oceania ban or restrict kosher and halal slaughter. These countries include Australia, New Zealand, Denmark, Sweden, Norway, Iceland, Belgium, and Switzerland. Bans on kosher slaughter have most often been promoted either by right-wing nationalists, secularists, and animal rights activists. The United States Office to Monitor and Combat Anti-Semitism has denounced the spread of kosher slaughter bans in Europe as "disgraceful", "intolerant", and tantamount to "a forced expulsion of Jewish communities from the countries that adopt such legislation."

The kosher tax conspiracy theory is a fringe conspiracy theory promoted by right-wing extremists that falsely claims that kosher certification of food products is part of a scheme to cost consumers extra money and thereby enrich rabbis. The Anti-Defamation League has called the conspiracy theory "bizarre" and a tactic that antisemites have used to "trick the uninformed into accepting conspiracy charges and stereotypes about Jews."

During the 2010s, the Alt-Right promoted anti-kosher sentiment. Some antisemitic members of the Alt-Right are opposed to purchase of kosher foods. Alt-Right websites have promoted an anti-kosher app called "KosChertified?", available on Apple's App Store and Google Android, that helps users locate food that is not kosher certified. One Alt-Right website claims that consumers have been "kept in the dark" about kosher certification and advance the conspiratorial view that "the tax exempt revenue flows to many programs and institutions worth examining for its effect on you and your interests." The Twitter account for the KosChertified" app is followed by the neo-Nazi Richard Spencer and other white supremacists, and frequently posts antisemitic and anti-Israel content.

In 2020, the French interior minister Gérald Darmanin was widely ridiculed and denounced on social media after claiming that kosher and halal aisles in supermarkets promote "separatism" and should therefore be removed. The French columnist Christophe Barbier agreed with Darmanin's statement, stating that "A kosher food aisle or halal food aisle is the beginning of communautarisme" and that kosher and halal food should only be stocked "in the normal, general aisles...because we know that everyone who goes there is Muslim or Jewish." The French legal scholar Rim-Sarah Alouane declared Darmanin's statement to be "absurd" and ignorant, accusing him of instrumentalizing laïcité to promote separatism rather than oppose it.

=== Jewish criticism ===
The Pittsburgh Platform, a pivotal 1885 document in the history of the American Reform Movement, discouraged keeping kosher as an outdated vestige from the past. The platform declared that "all such Mosaic and rabbinical laws as regulate diet...originated in ages and under the influence of ideas entirely foreign to our present mental and spiritual state. They fail to impress the modern Jew with a spirit of priestly holiness; their observance in our days is apt rather to obstruct than to further modern spiritual elevation." During the late 20th and early 21st century, keeping kosher has seen a revival among some Reform Jews. Rabbi Eric Yoffie, president of the Union for Reform Judaism, has promoted kashrut as a model for Reform Jewish dietary practice. However, Classical Reform Jews maintain their traditional opposition to keeping kosher.

The laws of kashrut specify that wine cannot be considered kosher if it might have been used for idolatry. These laws include prohibitions on Yayin Nesekh (יין נסך – "poured wine"), wine that has been poured to an idol, and Stam Yeynam (סתם יֵינָם), wine that has been touched by someone who believes in idolatry or produced by non-Jews. When kosher wine is yayin mevushal (יין מבושל – "cooked" or "boiled"), it becomes unfit for idolatrous use and will keep the status of kosher wine even if subsequently touched by an idolater. According to the Orthodox rabbi Nathan Lopes Cardozo, because non-mevushal wine cannot be touched by a non-Jew, some Jews have become uncomfortable with these laws because they "feel that it is discriminatory and perhaps racist."

Anti-religious secular Jewish Communists in the Soviet Union often incorporated pork and other non-kosher foods into their diets. Secular Jewish Communists often regarded kashrut as reactionary and outdated, happily discarding the religious views of their parents and grandparents.

== See also ==
- Kosher tax conspiracy theory
- Legal aspects of ritual slaughter
- Trefa Banquet
