= 72 virgins (disambiguation) =

72 virgins derives from a phrase in an Islamic hadith.

72 virgins may also refer to:

- Seventy-Two Virgins, a 2004 novel by Boris Johnson
- 72 Hoorain, a 2019 Indian Hindi-language supernatural film
- "72 virgins", a track on the 2007 album Shiny Happy Jihad by Joe Rogan
- "72 Virgins – Uncensored", a Telegram channel for Israeli public diplomacy in the Gaza war

== See also ==
- 72 Virginis, a star in Virgo
- Islamophobic trope#72 virgins
- Palestinian suicide attacks#72 virgins
