= Halal conspiracy theories =

Conspiracy theories about halal certification

Halal conspiracy theories revolve around a series of Islamophobic conspiracy theories and hoaxes regarding halal certification in products such as food, beverages and cosmetics. The claims usually made include that the sale of halal-certified goods in stores is a precursor to the Islamisation or institution of Sharia law in a non-Muslim country, that the fees paid by companies for halal certification fund Islamic terrorism, that halal slaughter for meat is cruel, unhygienic or constitutes as animal sacrifice, among others. The spread of these claims has resulted in boycotts and harassment campaigns against businesses who sell halal-certified products, most notably in Australia and India, although anti-halal boycott movements also exist in Denmark, France, Canada, New Zealand, the United Kingdom, and the United States.

== Background ==
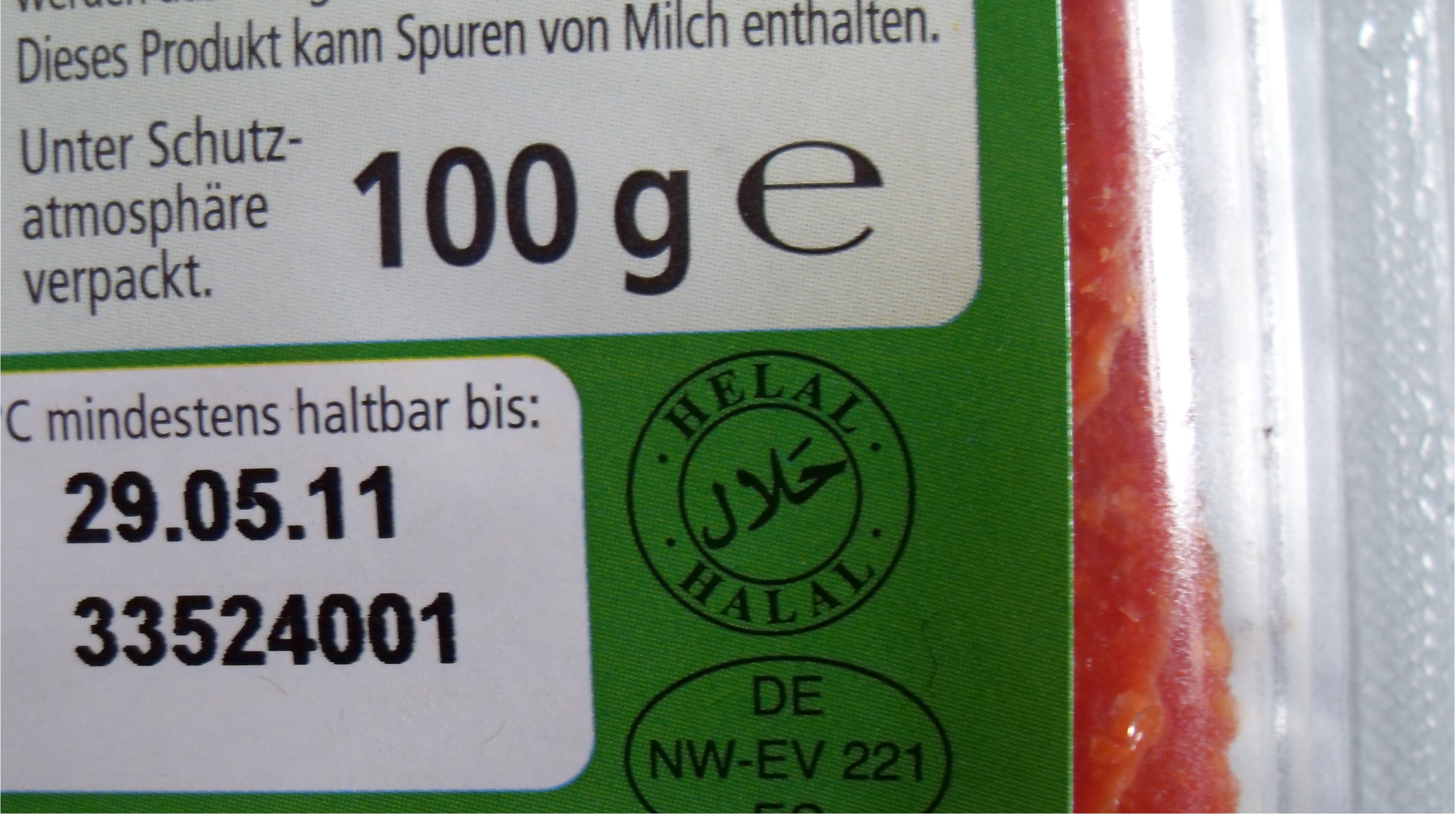
Halal certificate stamp on a German salami package

Halal, an Arabic word which translates to "permissible" in English, contrasted with haram ("forbidden"), designates things – including but not limited to food – that are lawful for Muslims to practice or consume, in accordance with the Quran. Islamic dietary laws dictate that food items must not contain pork or alcohol, and that halal animals must be slaughtered by a Muslim with the butcher uttering "In the name of Allah" before quickly slashing the animal's throat with a sharp knife, letting all blood drain out. Certification for halal products is given by legal authorities in most Muslim-majority countries, while in other countries it is voluntarily acquired by companies and issued by non-governmental organizations for an annual fee.

== Claims ==
The sale of products with halal certification or the establishment of halal shops and businesses is perceived by anti-halal conspiracy theorists as a precursor to the Islamisation of their countries or as an Islamist effort to force another religion on consumers, and some claim that fees paid by companies for halal certification fund Islamic terrorism, the implementation of Sharia law or cause consumers to subsidize another religious belief; makers and endorsers of such claims include politicians such as Pauline Hanson and George Christensen in Australia and Jörg Meuthen in Germany, counter-jihad organizations such as Sharia Watch UK, the Q Society of Australia and Britain First, and Indian Hindutva supporters and figures. A fact-check by ABC News of Australia concluded that while the proceeds of halal certification do occasionally fund Islamic organizations, there is no evidence that any of those funds have ever flowed to terrorist groups. The report also consulted several food companies that are halal-certified, including Nestlé, and they disclosed that the yearly fees for halal certification are negligible and do not influence the final price of their products. A Cadbury spokesperson told the Herald Sun that the fees did not affect pricing and were more than offset by access to broader markets.

Others claim that halal slaughter is cruel and inhumane, an accusation also made towards kosher slaughter and mostly based on the assumption that animals are not stunned prior to religious slaughters. The Food Standards Agency in the United Kingdom asserts that 88% of halal-slaughtered animals in Britain are stunned first, though there is debate among Islamic (as well as Jewish) scholars on what manners of stunning are more acceptable or whether stunning itself is humane at all.

In India, claims made by right-wing Hindutva activists include that halal-certified goods contain meat extracts and are thus unlawful for Hindus to consume, that uttering the name of Allah during halal slaughter means that the meat is an offering to another deity, that halal-certified companies only employ Muslims, and that spitting on food is part of the halal process. Indian fact-checking agencies have labeled these claims as "misleading," "ludicrous" and "certifiably false".

== Incidents ==
The spread of conspiracy theories and rumors regarding halal and halal certification has led to boycotts and harassment campaigns against companies and businesses.

In November 2014, South Australian dairy company Fleurieu Milk and Yoghurt was forced to drop a $50,000 contract with airline Emirates due to public pressure, as the contract required the products to be halal-certified. In January 2015, a Malaysian-owned café in Western Australia was subject to online harassment and calls for boycott after the owners made a Facebook post explaining what halal means in response to a negative review.

In early 2017, Cadbury was the target of separate but related calls for boycott in Australia and the United Kingdom, ostensibly due to alleged halal certification in its chocolate products. In Australia, these calls were spearheaded by Senator Pauline Hanson, who then claimed that the proceeds from Cadbury's halal-certified products were used to build mosques (two years prior, Hanson also propagated claims that such proceeds funded terrorism as well). In the United Kingdom, the campaign started in social media, accusing the company of "Muslim appeasement", and received support from the English Defence League. Cadbury and its parent company Mondelez released statements affirming that while its British chocolate products are suitable for vegetarians and those following a halal diet, they are not halal-certified.

Himalaya Drug Company of India has been targeted in social media for its halal certification in several occasions in 2021 and 2022, accused of using beef extracts in products and of having a pro-Muslim and anti-Hindu bias among executives and employees as a result. An Alt News fact-check on the former claim concluded that Himalaya does not use animal-based gelatin in the accused products (tablets), but vegetarian hypromellose, and that, by comparison, 98% of Indian pharmaceutical companies make use of animal-based capsules. Campaigns against state-owned companies in India such as the Indian Railway Catering and Tourism Corporation and Air India for offering halal-certified products have also been proposed in 2022.

== See also ==
- Kosher tax conspiracy theory
- Islamophobic trope
- Islamophobia in Australia
- Violence against Muslims in India
