= Shahidi =

- Pronunciation: Sha-HEE-dee
- Language: Arabic

Origin
- Meaning: witness
- Region of origin: The Middle East

Other names
- See also: Shahid (given name)

Shahidi (Persian: شهیدی) is a common surname in Iran, Afghanistan and Tajikistan. Like the given name Shahid, it is a Muslim theophoric name, from Ašh-Shāhid (الشهيد), one of the 99 names of God in the Qur'an. It is derived from šhāhid شاهد, the word for "witness" or "martyr".

== Shahidis of Iran ==
=== Sadat Shahidi Mashhad ===
The Shahidi family of Khorasan are a distinguished and influential Sayyid family that dominated the prominent religious positions in Mashhad for approximately 150 years, and thereby deeply influenced the contemporary history of Iran. They are descended from Ayatollah Mirza Mohammad Mehdi Khorasani (Persian: آيت الله میرزا محمد مهدی حسينی اصفهانی خراسانی شهید رابع), who traced his lineage to Imam Jafar Sadeq through Shah Nematollah Vali. In 1803, Mirza Mehdi became the fourth enumerated martyr (shahid) of Shia Islam when he was killed by (or at the direction of) Nader Mirza Afshar because Nader Mirza mistakenly blamed Mirza Mehdi for surrendering the city of Mashhad to the Qajars. As such, Mirza Mehdi's descendants became known as the Shahidi family. Mirza Mehdi was one of the most distinguished clerics of his time, teaching theology, Islamic jurisprudence, philosophical sciences, and mathematics. He was also the Custodian of the Shrine of Imam Reza and the Friday prayer leader. Currently, Hojjatoleslam Ahmad Alamolhoda (Sadat Shahidi) is the Friday Prayer leader in Mashhad and is also that city's representative in the Iranian Assembly of Experts. In 1927, when family names were chosen in Mashhad, some of Mirza Mehdi's descendants chose a name that contained Shahidi (e.g. Aleshahidi, Shahidi, Ghavam Shahidi, Nezam Shahidi, Taher Shahidi, Imen Shahidi, Vosough Shahidi, Davoud Shahidi or Emami Shahidi). However, other descendants chose different last names (e.g. Khorasani, Habibollahi, Habib, Alamolhoda, Fayyaz or Majidi).

=== Sadat Shahidi in Bafq (Bafgh) City of Yazd ===
Shahidi is the surname of descendants of the martyr Seyed Amin, known as ASeyed Ahmad Shahidi, a religious cleric born c. 1820 and killed by Qajar government forces for defense of human rights in Bafq city of Yazd province of Iran. This event occurred in the major Mosque of Bafq city about 1880. He is buried in the main mosque of Bafq city, and his biography is inscribed in the entrance porch of the mosque. He was of Sadat descent. After this event, his descendants changed their surname from Amin to Shahidi.

== Notable people with this surname ==
- Abdolvahaab Shahidi (1922–2021), Iranian singer and musician
- John Shahidi, Kurdish-American businessman
- Burhan Shahidi (1894–1989), Chinese Tatar politician, Governor of Xinjiang
- Freydoon Shahidi (born 1947), Iranian mathematician
- Ghavam Shahidi, Iranian-American
- Jafar Shahidi (1919–2008), Iranian scholar and historian of Islam
- Mohammad-Ali Shahidi, Iranian politician
- Tolib Shahidi (born 1946), Tajik composer
- Yara Shahidi (born 2000), American actress
- Ziyodullo Shahidi (1914–1985), Tajik musician
