= Shahida =

Shahida or Shaheeda may refer to:

- Shahida (died 1938), a wife of Saudi king Ibn Saud, mother of princes Mansour, Mishaal, Mutaib and princess Qumash
- Shahida (film), a 1949 Pakistani film
- a female martyr in Islam
  - an Islamophobic trope

== See also ==
- Shahid (disambiguation)
