= Kalma =

Kalma may refer to:

- Kalma or shahada, an Islamic oath of allegiance
  - Six Kalmas, phrases articulating Muslim belief
- Kalma (folklore), a concept related to death in Finnish folklore
- Alprazolam, a psychiatric medication, available under brand names including Kalma
- "Kalma", a song by Toshi Sabri and Shaarib Sabri from the 2012 Indian film Will You Marry Me?
- Kalma, Sudan, relocation camp in Sudan
- Kalma, Estonia, village in Saaremaa Parish, Saare County, Estonia
- Kalmasaari, a divided island in the Finland-Russia border
- Kalma Airport, Wonsan, Kangwon-do, North Korea
- Niko Hurme, a Finnish rock musician, stage-name Kalma
- Ariel Kalma (1947–2025), French new-age composer and electronic musician

== See also ==
- Shahada (disambiguation)
- Shahadat (disambiguation)
