= Shahd =

Shahd (شَهَد or شَهْد; also romanized as Shahad or Shahed) is an Arabic feminine given name, which means 'pure honey’ or ‘honeycomb'. Notable people with the name include:

== Given name ==
- Shahed Ahmed (born 1985), English footballer
- Shahd Alshammari, Kuwaiti academic
- Shahad Budebs (born 1994), Emirati footballer
- Shahad Abdullah (born 2005), famous writer

== See also ==
- Shahid (disambiguation)
