= Trope (politics) =

Cliché stories in politics

A political trope is a commonly expressed but deeply biased narrative, message, viewpoint, or explanation of social problems that has become a form of propaganda. Typically, tropes are one-sided oversimplifications or exaggerated perspectives on complex societal realities. John S. Nelson argued in 1998 that tropes were not examined thoroughly enough, and that being more aware of them would improve political discussion and debate. In 2021, Renée DiResta argued for prebunking health misinformation tropes as a way of reducing the spread of misleading information.

== Examples of types ==
- Ableist tropes
- Antisemitic tropes
- Childless cat ladies
- Fascist tropes
- Health misinformation tropes
- Islamophobic trope
- Outside agitators at protests
- Racist tropes
- The invisible hand

== American political tropes ==
- American exceptionalism
- Coastal elites vs. the heartland
- Deep state conspiracy theory
- Illegal immigration and crime
- Race and crime
- The welfare queen
- Owning the libs

== See also ==
- Trope (disambiguation)
- Framing (social sciences)
