= Trope =

A trope in its original sense is any instance of figurative (non-literal) language, such as a metaphor, hyperbole, or personification. It has also broadened to mean any commonly recurring idea, phrase, image, artistic technique, artistic element, or cliché.

== Arts, literature, and communication ==
- Literary device, any intentional or special use of language
- Narrative device, any intentional technique for conveying a story
  - Genre trope, or genre convention, a recurring element that traditionally appears across various stories
    - Fantasy trope, any common element across works of the fantasy genre
    - Trope (cinema), any common convention or technique used in filmmaking
  - Plot device, any technique that drives a story's plot forward
  - Motif (narrative), any recurring element within one particular story
- Trope (music), an addition to a piece of medieval music
- Trope (politics), the common use of a particular biased narrative or message for political purposes

== Philosophy and religion ==
- Trope (philosophy), any of various technical terms in philosophy
- Hebrew cantillation, trope, or trop, the manner of chanting readings from the Hebrew Bible, characterised by distinct word or syllable emphasis and musical motifs, disjuncts and slurs

== Science and technology ==
- Trope (mathematics), an archaic geometry term for a tangent line or plane
- Tropidophiidae, or tropes, a family of dwarf boa snakes
- Tropes Zoom, a desktop search-engine software

== People ==
- Michael Trope (born 1951), American trial lawyer and former sports agent

== See also ==
- TV Tropes, a wiki for conventions and devices found within creative works
