= Shahada (disambiguation) =

Shahada or Shahadah is an Islamic oath, one of the Five Pillars of Islam.

Shahada or variants may also refer to:

== Places ==
- Shahada, Maharashtra, India
  - Shahada (Vidhan Sabha constituency)
- Shahad, Thāne district, Maharashtra, India
  - Shahad railway station

== People ==
- Abdul-Ghani Shahad (born 1968), Iraqi footballer
- Greg Shahade (born 1978), American chess player
- Jennifer Shahade (born 1980), American chess player
- Raghdan Shehadeh (born 1977), Syrian footballer
- Rafiq Shahadah (born 1956), Syrian army general
- Rasha Shehada (born c. 1985), Palestine businesswoman
- Salah Shehade (1953–2002), former member of Hamas

== Other uses ==
- Shahada (film), a 2010 German film

== See also ==
- Shahadat (disambiguation)
- Kalma (disambiguation), another term for the shahada
