= Seventy-Two Virgins =

2004 comic political novel by Boris Johnson

Seventy-Two Virgins: A Comedy of Errors
- First edition cover
- Author: Boris Johnson
- Language: English
- Genre: Political satire
- Set in: London
- Publisher: HarperCollins
- Publication date: September 2004
- Publication place: United Kingdom
- Media type: Print: Hardback octavo
- Pages: 326
- ISBN: 9780007195909
- OCLC: 056649301
- Dewey Decimal: 823.92

Seventy-Two Virgins: A Comedy of Errors is a 2004 novel by Boris Johnson. It received mixed reviews on original release.

== Plot ==
"To a man like Roger Barlow, the whole world just seemed to be a complicated joke ... everything was always up for grabs, capable of dispute; and religion, laws, principle, custom – these were nothing but sticks from the wayside to support our faltering steps."

— Seventy-Two Virgins: A Comedy of Errors

The President of the United States plans to visit the Palace of Westminster. A Lebanese-born terrorist aims to assassinate him; Roger Barlow, a hapless, bicycle-riding, tousled-haired MP aims to foil the attack in order to distract from a scandal involving his financial entanglement in a lingerie shop named Eulalie.

== Title ==
The title is a reference to the Islamophobic trope about "72 virgins" being the main motive of Muslim men who are willing to die in acts of warfare or political violence, a concept that does not appear in the Quran. The trope is often claimed to be supported by an obscure Central Asian hadith about houris in paradise. The "72 virgins" translation of that hadith possibly originates from a "war on terror" era American English translation of that hadith being quoted in a 1996 anti-American manifesto by Osama bin Laden. Since then it has become an extremely widespread Islamophobic trope.

== Reception ==
Seventy-Two Virgins received mixed reviews on original release. David Smith, writing for The Observer, said "despite the pacy narration, there is a sense of going nowhere fast", but praised the humour, saying "Yet while Johnson is a heroic failure as a novelist, he scores in his comic handling of those most sensitive issues: the ideological motives of Muslim suicide bombers (whence the title) and the mixed blessings of the American empire. The playing of these as pantomime risks causing offence, but, as in person, Johnson succeeds in being charming and sincere."

The Spectator (which Johnson was editing at the time) gave it a positive review, Douglas Hurd comparing it to P. G. Wodehouse (the plot device of a character being threatened by potential scandal regarding his involvement in a lingerie business named 'Eulalie' is lifted directly from Wodehouse's The Code of the Woosters) and praising the "rollicking pace and continuous outpouring of comic invention"; however, he also said that it read like it had been written in three days. Hurd also accurately described Johnson as "the next prime minister but three".

In the Literary Review, Philip Oakes said that the "Thrills [were] muffled by relentless jokiness and inordinate length of book."

Attention was refocused on Seventy-Two Virgins in 2019, with Johnson poised to win the Conservative Party leadership election and become Prime Minister of the United Kingdom. In The Guardian, Mark Lawson noted that "it's striking that Barlow's view – that public value should make private conduct irrelevant – is one the writer has continued to embrace through domestic troubles." He noted the anti-French and anti-American tone, and pointed out the use of offensive language: "references to 'Islamic headcases' and 'Islamic nutcases'. Arabs are casually noted to have 'hook noses' and 'slanty eyes'; a mixed-race Briton is called 'coffee-coloured'; and there are mentions of 'pikeys' and people who are 'half-caste'." Sexist content was also noted. More sinister was that "the suggestion – from both an external observer, and the protagonist's inner voice – that Barlow [the author surrogate] may be a fraud. His assistant worries that, under the jaunty vaudeville act, there are no real core ideals, values or beliefs." The novel was also criticised for depicting Jews as "controlling the media" and being able to "fiddle" elections, an evidently antisemitic trope. During the 2019 general election campaign, Catherine Bennett similarly argued that the novel "amounts to a compelling case for character reappraisal" and that its perceived tendency to evaluate women's worth "according to their fuckability on the – sometimes eccentric – Johnson scale" indicates a lack of "interest in addressing, for instance, sex discrimination, harassment, [or] the gender pay gap".
