= Shohada Rural District =

Shohada Rural District may refer to the following places in Iran:

- Shohada Rural District (Behshahr County), Mazandaran Province
- Shohada Rural District (Meybod County), Yazd province
