= Kosher tax conspiracy theory =

Conspiracy theory about kosher certification

The "Kosher tax" (or "Jewish tax") is the idea that food companies and unwitting consumers are forced to pay money to support Judaism or Zionist causes and Israel through the costs of kosher certification. The claim is a conspiracy theory, antisemitic canard, or urban legend.

Common refutations include that consumers who prefer kosher foods include not only Jews but also Muslims, Seventh-day Adventists, and others, food companies actively seek kosher certification to increase market share and profitability; the fees collected support the certifying organizations themselves and that extra business generated by the voluntary certification process more than makes up for the cost of supervision and so the certification does not necessarily increase the price of products and may, in fact, result in per item cost savings.

== Claims ==
The kosher tax conspiracy theory claims that the kosher certification of products (typically food) is an extra tax collected from unwitting consumers for the benefit of Jewish organizations. It is mainly spread by antisemitic, white supremacist, and other extremist organizations, and is considered a canard or urban legend. Similar claims are made that this "Kosher tax" (or "Jewish tax") is "extorted" from food companies wishing to avoid a boycott, and used to support Zionist causes or the state of Israel. University of Pittsburgh professor of sociology Kathleen M. Blee reported that some racist groups encourage consumers to avoid this "Jewish tax" by boycotting kosher products.

=== Canada ===
The 2000 Annual Audit of Antisemitic Incidents by the B'nai Brith Canada reported citizens being encouraged to request a refund from the government on their income taxes.

In 1997 the Canada Revenue Agency issued a news release noting the existence of flyers recommending that consumers claim a deduction on their taxes "because they supposedly contributed to a Jewish religious organization when they purchased these groceries." In it Jane Stewart, then Minister of National Revenue stated, "The intent and message in this literature is deeply offensive to the Jewish community and, indeed, to all Canadians. The so-called 'deduction' described in these flyers does not exist and I urge all taxpayers to ignore this misleading advice".

During the 2014 Quebec provincial election campaign, Parti Québécois (PQ) candidate and academic Louise Mailloux defended the PQ government's proposed Quebec Charter of Values by asserting that kosher and halal certification was a religious tax used to fund religious wars and enrich religious leaders. The Centre for Israel and Jewish Affairs called on the PQ to debunk the "urban legend of the kosher tax" but PQ leader and Premier of Quebec Pauline Marois defended her candidate's comments saying of Mailloux, "Her writings are eloquent, I respect her point of view."

== Refutation ==
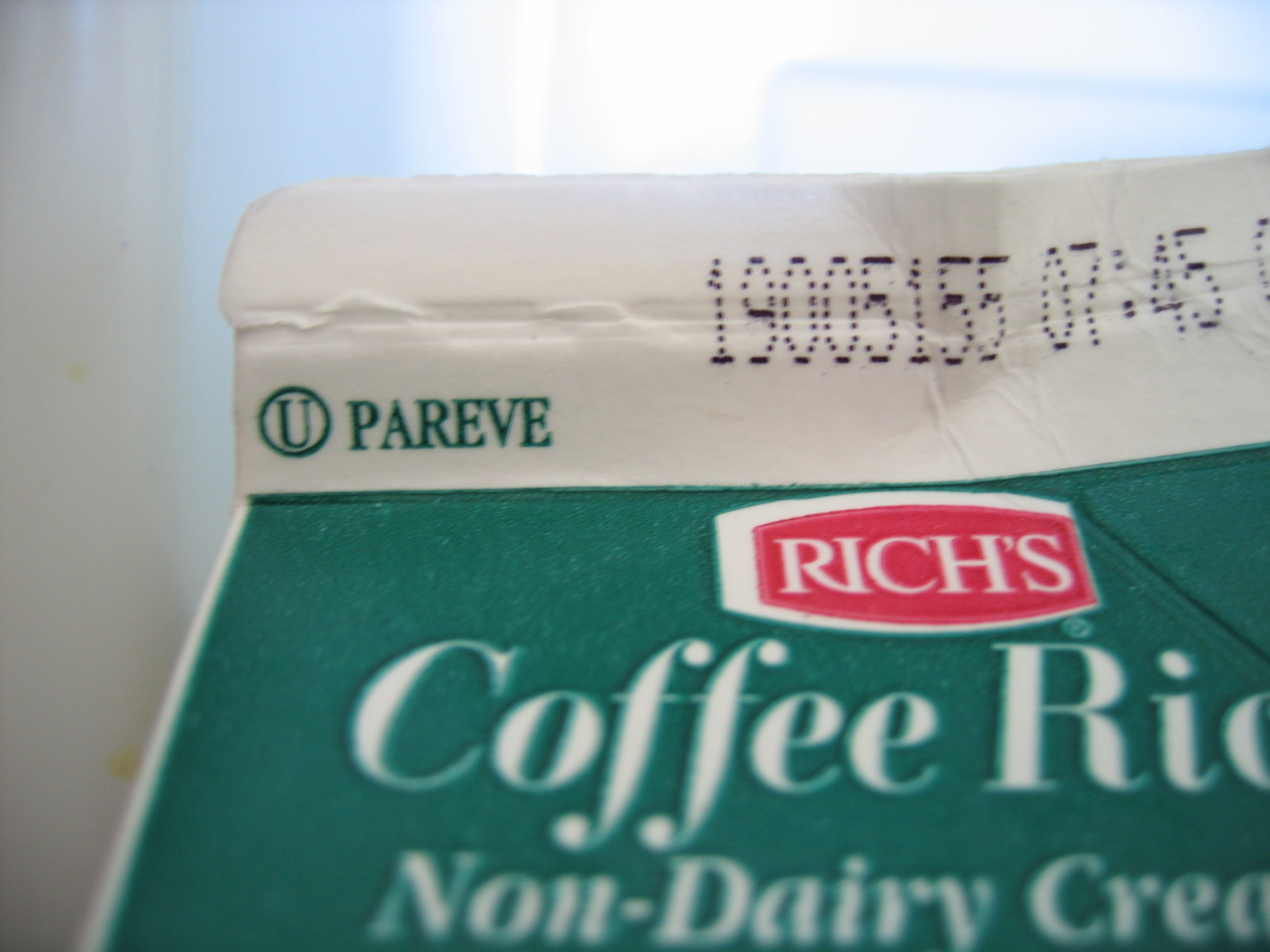
This Orthodox Union kosher certification mark denotes Kosher pareve. Kosher certification is a voluntary process.

Although companies may apply for kosher certification, the cost of the certification is typically minuscule, and is more than offset by the advantages of being certified. The cost per item for obtaining kosher certification was reported by The New York Times in 1975 to be 6.5 millionths of a cent ($0.000000065) for a General Foods frozen-food item.

Certification leads to increased revenues by opening up additional markets to Jews who keep kosher, Muslims who keep halal, Seventh-day Adventists, vegetarians, and the lactose intolerant who wish to avoid dairy products (products that are reliably certified as pareve meet this criterion).

Quebec's Bouchard-Taylor Commission refuted what it described as the "most fanciful information is circulating among Quebeckers" about the so-called kosher tax in its 2008 report and stated that there was no evidence of price inflation as a result of kosher certification and that rabbis made little money from granting certification.

According to Berel Wein, "The cost of kashrut certification is always viewed as an advertising expense and not as a manufacturing expense." Dispellers of the "kosher tax" legend argue that if it were not profitable to obtain such certification, then food producers would not engage in the certification process, and that the increased sales resulting from kosher certification actually lower the overall cost per item. Avi Shafran adds that if "the kosher item in fact proves more expensive, [the consumer] can simply opt for one that hasn’t been supervised by a rabbi".

Obtaining certification that an item is kosher is a voluntary business decision made by companies desiring additional sales from consumers (both Jewish and non-Jewish) who look for kosher certification when shopping. According to Snopes, the fees charged for kosher certification are used to support the operation of the certifying bodies themselves, and not "some special Jewish fund used to advance Zionist causes".

== See also ==
- Halal conspiracy theories
