= Shahd Alshammari =

Kuwaiti writer and academic

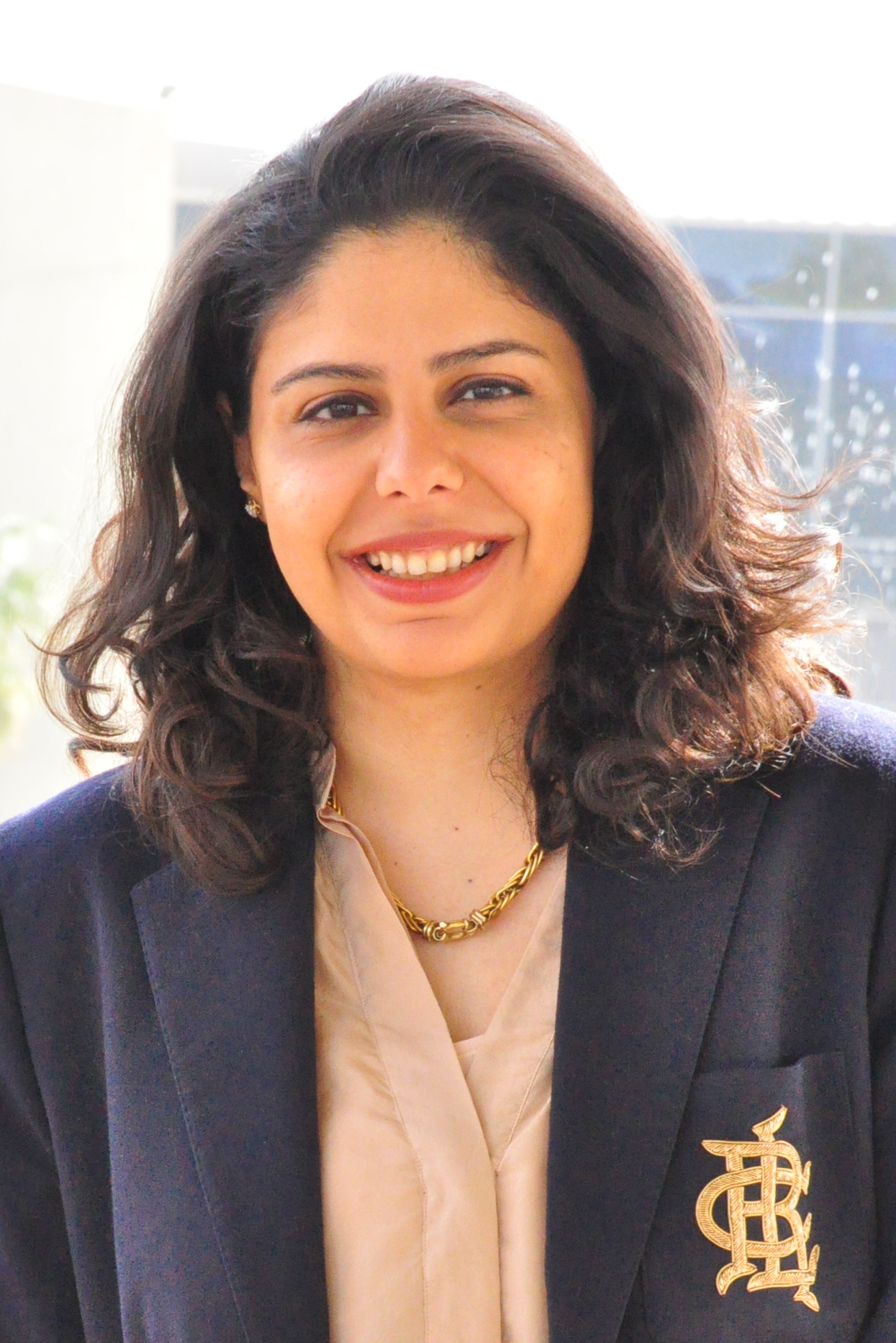
- Alshammari in 2018
- Born: Kuwait
- Education: Bachelor's degree in English Language and Literature; Master's degree in English Studies (Merit); TEFL (Teaching English as a Foreign Language) Certificate; Doctorate degree in English
- Alma mater: Kuwait University; University of Exeter; University of Toronto; University of Kent
- Occupations: Writer, editor, assistant professor of the English language, researcher, screenwriter, director, club supervisor, team trainer, organizer, chairwoman
- Writing career
- Language: English, Arabic
- Genres: Novel, academic and literary articles, research
- Notable awards: British Council Alumni Awards – Social Impact (March 2019)

Shahd Alshammari (Arabic: شهد الشمري) is a Kuwaiti writer, academic scholar and assistant professor of the English language. She is well known for her researches that focus on human and women's rights, disability issues and, recently, illness narrative. She published six books, in total, three of which she was the author, and the other three co-author. Additionally, she participated in over 15 conference, both as attendee and Keynote speaker, and discussed different topics in the fields of literature and culture. In 2019, she was nominated for the British Council Alumni Awards – Social Impact. In 2021 she won Outstanding Monograph of the Year from the National Communication Association's (NAC).

== Personal life ==
Alshammari is born to a Bedouin father and a Palestinian mother.

Diagnosed with Multiple sclerosis at the age of 18, Alshammari never learned to give up and continued her education, until she earned her doctoral degree in 2014. Her parents played a huge role in encouraging Alshammari to earn her place in the society, and help disabled persons achieve the same. Her mother refused to believe that her daughter deserved special treatment, which resulted in Alshammari's growing to becoming fully independent on herself, even in dealing with any form of pain. Consequently, and owing to Dr. Stella Bolaki, one of Alshammari's PhD supervisors, Alshammari delved deep into the field of disability studies to better understand her struggle with Multiple Sclerosis. This, too, helped her discover her path in academia and creative writing.

== Education ==
Throughout her educational history, Alshammari received a number of degrees. In 2008, Alshammari obtained her bachelor's in English Language and Literature from Kuwait University, her master's in English studies from the University of Exeter in 2009, and, finally, her phD in English from the University of Kent in 2014. She also got her TEFL Certificate from the University of Toronto, in 2009.

== Career ==
Alshammari held several positions in the fields of teaching and writing. Firstly, she worked as an adjunct lecturer in Arab Open University and Gulf University for Science and Technology from the year 2013 to 2015, and then got promoted to an assistant professor in the same two universities from the year 2015 until the present day. In addition, she offered her services in writing by serving as an editor for two academic journals, namely «Considering Disability» journal, from the year 2014 to 2015, and «Disability & Society» Kuwaiti journal. For the latter journal, Alshammari reviewed articles submitted by scholars worldwide, and checked whether the content of the articles conformed with the guidelines of the journal. As a result of her contributions to the academic community, Alshammari was identified as one of the Kuwaiti representatives in the field of research at the international level.

In an interview with Al-Qabas newspaper, Alshammari highlighted the importance of shedding light on issues relating to persons with special needs, and openly discuss it locally and internationally. She also expressed her dedication to work hard and leave her mark in the field of human rights.

Moreover, she participated in a number of literary events, including Emirates Airline Festival of Literature and Malta Book Festival, where she presented her work that substantially focused on disability and women's issues. In the Emirates Airline Festival of Literature of 2016, Alshammari gave a speech in the Arabic and English languages about the contribution of literature in improving living conditions and achieve equity among every group in the society.

On a vocational level, Alshammari is currently working on a children's book, which, despite the difficulties faced in composing it, she believes is necessary, for it discusses the concept of mental and physical disability from a kid's perspective. It also details the doctor-patient relationship in the context of the Middle East. Whereas, on a personal level, she has set out to explore communities dedicated to helping out disabled women.

== Works ==
=== Books ===
Few of her books include:

- "On love and loss," Strategic Book Publishing & Rights Agency, New York City, 2015.
- "Literary madness in British, Postcolonial, and Bedouin Women’s Writing," Cambridge Scholars Press, United Kingdom, 2016.
- "Forget the Words," Dar Kalemat Publishing House, Mirqab, 2016.
- "The Secret of 50/50", Dar Kalemat Publishing House, Mirqab, 2018.
- Head Above Water: Reflections on Illness, Neem Tree Press, London, 2022.

=== Story collections ===
- "Notes on the Flesh," FARAXA Publishing, Malta, 2017. Through this collection, Alshammari takes inspiration from her journey and the journey of other Multiple Sclerosis patients to raise awareness on disability issues with respect to the difference in gender.

=== Chapters ===
- "A Hybridized Academic Identity: Negotiating a Disability Within Academia’s Discourse of Ableism,” Negotiating Disability: Disclosure and Higher Education, edited by Stephanie Kerschbaum and Laura Eisenman, University of Michigan Press, Ann Arbor, 2017.
- "The Illusion of Us," Arab Women Voice New Realities, edited by Roseanne Khalaf and Dima Nasser, Turning Point Press, Beirut, 2018.
- "Microaggressions in Flux Whiteness, Disability, and Masculinity in Academia," De-Whitening Intersectionality: Race, Intercultural Communication, and Politics, edited by Shinsuke Eguchi, Bernadette Marie Calafell, and Shadee Abdi, Lexington Books, New York City, 2020.
- Representations of Dangerous Women in Kuwaiti Musalsalat: Examining the Portrayal of Kuwaiti Women and the Nuclear Family, Northwestern University, Qatar, (date TBA).

=== Other publications ===
- "Problematic Politics of Meanings in Paulo Coelho's Eleven Minutes," Making Connections: Interdisciplinary Approaches to Cultural Diversity, vol. 14, no. 2, Bloomsburg University of Pennsylvania, Pennsylvania. 2013.
- "Children’s Romantic Literature in the Eighteenth Century," International Journal of Humanities and Cultural Studies, vol. 2, no. 1, June 2015.
- "Madwomen Agents in British, Postcolonial, and Bedouin Writing," Journal of Middle East Women's Studies, vol. 12, no. 2, Duke University, North Carolina, 2016.
- "Comment from the Field: Disability, Coping, and Identity,” Journal of Literary and Cultural Disability Studies, vol. 10, no. 3, Liverpool University Press, Liverpool, 2016.
- "Activism Inside a Kuwaiti Classroom," The St. John's University Humanities Review, vol. 14, no. 1, Spring 2017.
- "On Mares in Miral Al-Tahawy’s The Tent," Cultural Intertexts, vol. 7, no. 1. November 2017.
- "Transgression, Desire, and Death in Mai Al-Nakib’s Echo Twins, and Arundhati Roy’s The God of Small Things." IAFOR Journal of Arts & Humanities, vol. 4, no. 1, 2017.
- "Troubling Academe: Disability, Borders, and Boundaries,” Journal of Middle East Women's Studies, vol. 13, no. 3, Duke University, North Carolina, November 2017.
- "How Literature Saves Lives," Al-Raida Journal, no. 152, 2018.
- "Writing an Illness Narrative and Negotiating Identity: A Kuwaiti Academic/Author’s Journey,” Life Writing, 2018.
- “On Being Woman, Other, Disabled: Navigating Identity,” Word and Text: a Journal of Literary Studies and Linguistics, 2018.
- “Recasting Dorothy Wordsworth: A woman writer's undiscovered literary voice,” Arab Journal for the Humanities, vol. 37, no. 146, 2019.
- “On Survival and Education: An Academic's Perspective on Disability,” Canadian Journal of Disability Studies, vol. 8, no. 4, 2019.
- “But They’re Nothing Like Us!” A Pedagogic Approach to Shakespearean Drama in Kuwait, Cultural Intertexts, vol. 9, no. 1, 2019.
- “Writing The Silenced Body,” Journal of Middle East Women's Studies, vol. 16, no. 1, 2020.
- "Narrative Reflections on Losing a Companion Animal: In Memory of Flake," Journal of Autoethnography, vol. 1, no. 4, 2020.
- “Down the Rabbit-hole. Health, Illness, and Survival,” Rusted Radishes: Beirut Literary and Art Journal, American University of Beirut, Beirut, (date TBA).
- "Female Representation in the Golden Age of Kuwaiti Television: Stigma, Subversion, and Agency,” Middle East Journal of Culture and Communication, (date TBA).

== Awards ==
- British Council Alumni Awards – Social Impact, March 2019.
