= Shahid Khan (disambiguation) =

Shahid Khan (born 1952) is a Pakistani-American businessman and sports tycoon.

Shahid Khan may also refer to:

- Shahid Khan (actor), Pakistani film actor noted in Pashto cinema
- Shahid Khan (born 1981), British-Pakistani musician known as Naughty Boy
- Mahewish Shahid Khan (born 1981), female Pakistani cricketer
- Shahid Ali Khan (field hockey) (born 1964), Pakistani hockey player
- Shahid Ali Khan (Qawwal singer), Pakistani-Canadian singer
- Shahid Ashfaqallah Khan (1900–1927), Indian freedom fighter
- Shahid Masood Khan, Pakistani doctor and journalist
- Shahid Parvez Khan (born 1955), Indian sitar player
- Shahid Zaman Khan (born 1982), Pakistani squash player
- Shahid Khan, fictional character played by Jaideep Ahlawat in the Indian film series Gangs of Wasseypur
