= Islamophobic trope =

False or maliciously exaggerated claims about Muslims and Islam

Islamophobic tropes, also known as anti-Muslim tropes, are sensational reports, misrepresentations, or fabrications regarding Muslims as a group or Islam as a religion.

Since the 20th century, malicious allegations about Muslims have increasingly recurred as a motif in Islamophobic tropes, often taking the form of libels, stereotypes, or conspiracy theories. These tropes typically portray Muslims as violent, oppressive, or inherently extremist, with some also featuring the denial or trivialization of historical injustices against Muslim communities. These stereotypes have contributed to discrimination, hate crimes, and the systemic marginalization of Muslims throughout history.

During the colonial era, European powers advanced the stereotype of Muslims as inherently despotic and backward to legitimize imperial rule over Muslim-majority lands. These tropes often depicted Islam as incompatible with modernity and democracy, reinforcing policies of cultural suppression and economic exploitation.

In the 20th and 21st centuries, Islamophobic narratives evolved into modern conspiracy theories, particularly the notion that Muslims are attempting to "Islamize the Western world" or that they constitute a secret fifth column plotting against non-Muslim societies. The rise of Islamist extremist groups in recent decades has been used to justify broad generalizations about Muslims as inherently violent or sympathetic to terrorism. These tropes have fueled policies such as surveillance of Muslim communities, restrictions on religious practices (including hijab bans), and outright bans on Muslim immigration in some countries.

Most contemporary Islamophobic tropes involve either the exaggeration of violence committed by Muslims or the denial or trivialization of violence against Muslims. Common examples include the claim that Muslims "play the victim" to manipulate public perception, or that Islam is uniquely responsible for terrorism while ignoring or downplaying violence committed by non-Muslims. In recent years, the denial or justification of human rights abuses against Muslims, such as the persecution of the Rohingya in Myanmar or the internment of Uyghurs in China, has been a key component of Islamophobic discourse.

== Demography and migration tropes and conspiracy theories ==
=== White genocide conspiracy theory ===
The white genocide conspiracy theory term "Great Replacement" was created by a Frenchman called Renaud Camus in 2011 identifying immigration policies as the main issue affecting the shift in the demographics of France.

Since the early 21st century, particularly following the European migrant crisis of 2015, the White genocide conspiracy theory has increasingly targeted Muslims. The theory falsely claims that Muslim immigration and higher birth rates are part of a coordinated effort to replace White populations in Europe and North America. This narrative is often fueled by far-right figures, who depict Muslim migrants as an existential threat to Western civilization, framing their presence as an "invasion" rather than natural demographic shifts caused by conflict, globalization, and labor migration.

Much of this rhetoric is rooted in fears about cultural and religious transformation, with Islam portrayed as inherently incompatible with Western values. Proponents of the conspiracy theory often link it to broader Islamophobic tropes, including the belief that Muslims refuse to assimilate and aim to impose Islamic law (sharia) on non-Muslim societies.

Belief in the white genocide theory has been linked to acts of terrorism targeting Muslim communities. Notable incidents include the 2019 Christchurch mosque shootings in New Zealand, where the attacker explicitly cited the Great Replacement conspiracy theory in his manifesto before killing 51 worshippers. Other violent attacks motivated by similar ideology include the 2017 Quebec City mosque shooting and the 2021 London, Ontario truck attack, both of which targeted Muslim families.

==== Versions that include non-Muslims ====
Variations of the trope have also been used against other groups including Jews and black South Africans. These versions of the conspiracy theory often also include Islamophobia or are used in attempts to justify policies biased against Muslim immigrants.

In the Great Replacement conspiracy theory, Jews are often characterised as the masterminds while the immigrants are Muslims or another group. Some variations of the theory claim that Western political elites (often described as Jewish or implied to be such) are deliberately enabling mass Muslim immigration to dilute national identities, a narrative echoed in slogans such as the "Great Replacement", popularized by figures like French writer Renaud Camus.

=== Migration politics in Australia and the United Kingdom ===
==== Immigration politics ====
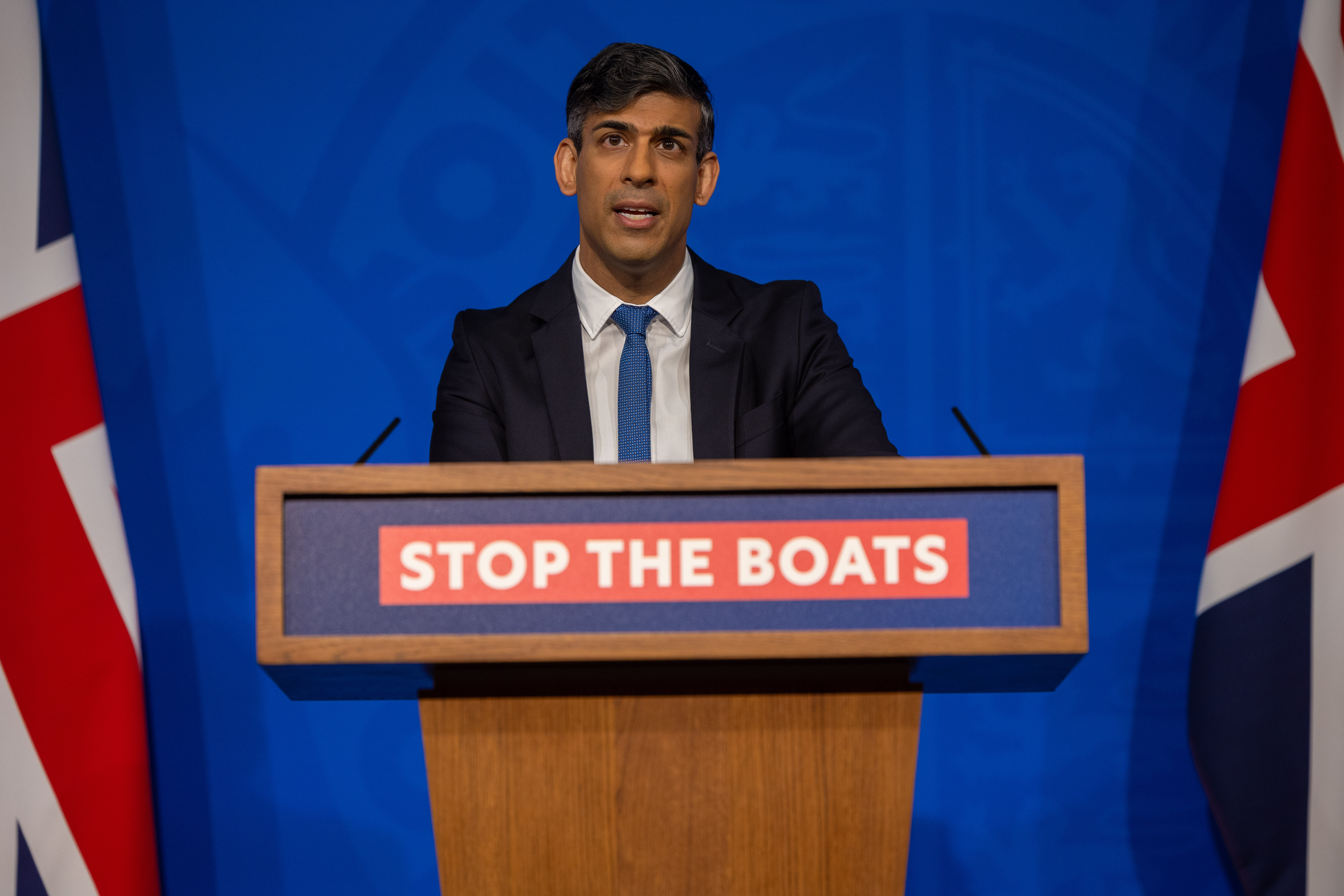
British Prime Minister Rishi Sunak at a press conference about the Rwanda asylum plan in April 2024, standing behind a lectern that says "stop the boats".

Another variant of the white genocide story claimed that violent robberies of South African farmers were an attempt to commit genocide against South Africa's white minority. Some people who claim this version of the story are also intensely Islamophobic, such as Matthew Heimbach from the "Youth for Western Civilization" and right-wing Australian politician Peter Dutton. In 2018 Dutton tried to argue that white South Africans should be given asylum status in Australia, despite Dutton being in favour of Australia's extremely harsh treatment of other asylum seekers. The asylum seekers excluded and mistreated by Australia's harshest immigration politics were frequently Muslim, but generally referred to by political dog whistles referring to people coming by boat. Dutton personally argued against Palestinian asylum seekers being given assistance during the Gaza war, despite them already receiving generally unfavorable treatment. Dutton described previous Lebanese immigration as a "mistake".

==== "Stop the boats" ====
The "stop the boats" dog whistle has spread from Australia to the United Kingdom. It is an Islamophobic trope in both countries. "Stop the boats" was used as an immigration policy slogan by the Conservative Party in the United Kingdom under Rishi Sunak's leadership. The slogan was later chanted by anti-Muslim mobs during the 2024 United Kingdom riots.

==== "Grooming gangs" controversy in the United Kingdom ====
Failures by British institutions in preventing, identifying and prosecuting the widespread cases of group-based child sexual abuse and exploitation that mostly occurred between the 1990s and 2010s, where many of perpetrators were of Pakistani British origin, have been described as a grooming gangs scandal. Both far-right and liberal commentators have promoted the trope of "Muslim grooming gangs" in the United Kingdom, selectively amplifying cases involving Muslim perpetrators of Pakistani descent while downplaying or ignoring similar crimes committed by non-Muslims. The "Muslim grooming gangs" narrative capitalizes on other Islamophobic stereotypes, such as alleged violence and traditional misogyny of the Muslims.

==== Love jihad conspiracy theory ====
"Love jihad" is an Islamophobic Hindu nationalist conspiracy theory in India promoted by far-right Hindutva activists, alleging Muslim men feign love for Hindu women in order to make them convert to Islam and produce Muslim offspring, thereby skewing the demographics in favour of Islam. Occasionally the genders are reversed and Muslim women are accused of seducing Hindu men to convert to Islam, citing the historical examples of Kalapahad and Tansen. Using this as a reason, many state governments in India ruled by the Bharatiya Janata Party has introduced laws banning interfaith marriage.

==== Gaming jihad and mazhar jihad ====
'Gaming jihad' and 'mazhar jihad' are Islamophobic dog-whistles coined by Indian pro-BJP journalist Sudhir Chaudhary in order to advocate for a social boycott of Muslims. The former alleges that Muslims are luring Generation Z Hindu teenagers to convert to Islam through interactions held on online gaming platforms like Twitch and Discord. The latter alleges are Muslims are gradually taking over public properties and land owned by Hindus through illegal encroachment to convert them into mausoleums.

Corona Jihad

Corona Jihad is a conspiracy theory that emerged during the COVID-19 pandemic alleging that Muslims were deliberately spreading the virus. The claim was widely debunked by fact-checkers and condemned by human-rights organizations

== Other conspiracy theories ==
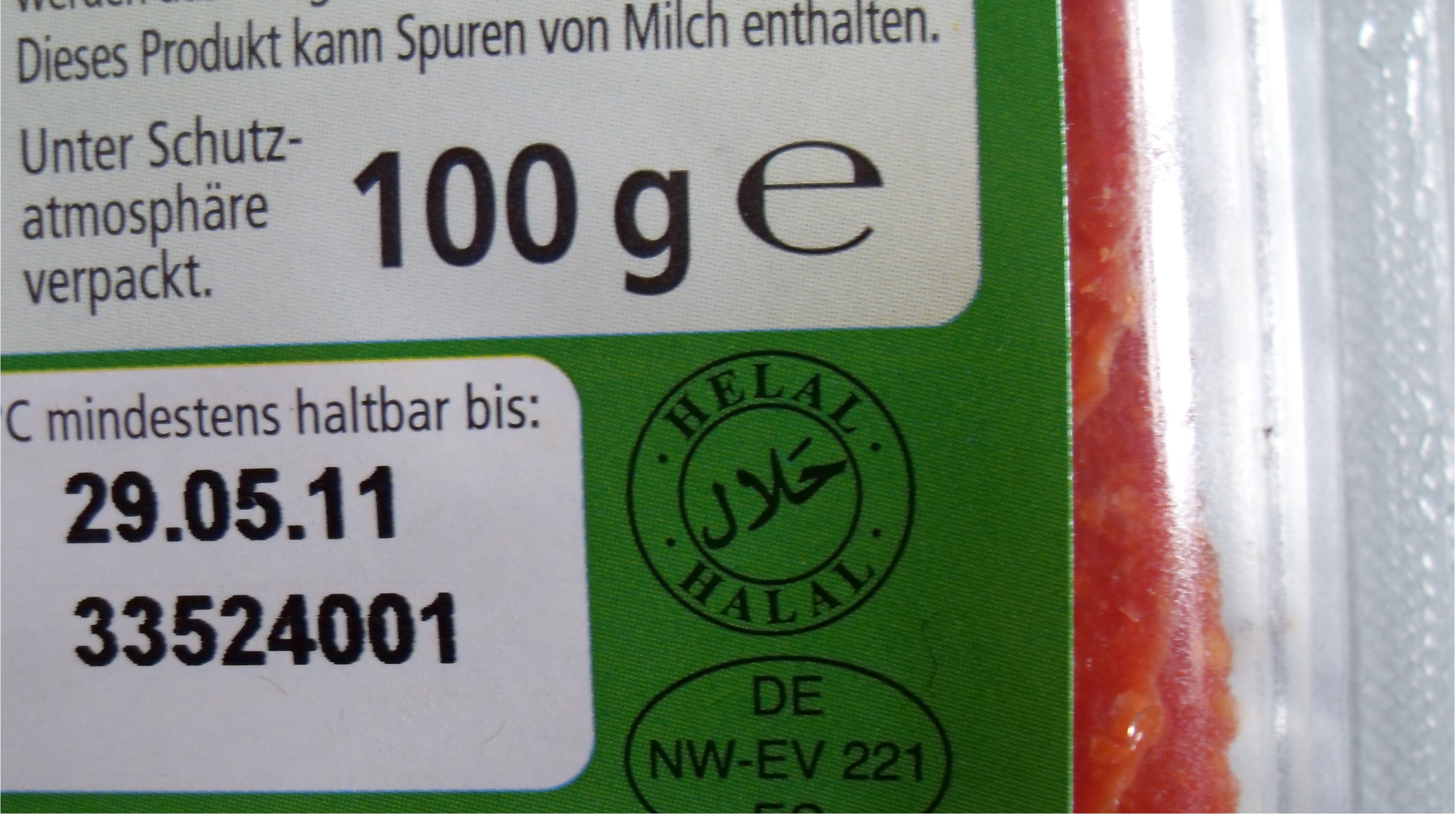
Halal certificate stamp on a German salami package. The text in the logo says: Arabic: حَلال, romanized: Halal and Helal.

=== Halal conspiracy theories ===
Halal conspiracy theories revolve around a series of Islamophobic conspiracy theories and hoaxes regarding halal certification in products such as food, beverages and cosmetics. The claims usually made include that the sale of halal-certified goods in stores is a precursor to the Islamisation or institution of Sharia law in a non-Muslim country, that the fees paid by companies for halal certification fund Islamic terrorism, that halal slaughter for meat is cruel, unhygienic or constitutes as animal sacrifice, among others. The spread of these claims has resulted in boycotts and harassment campaigns against businesses who sell halal-certified products, most notably in Australia and India, although anti-halal boycott movements also exist in Denmark, France, Canada, New Zealand, the United Kingdom, and the United States.

=== Pallywood ===
"Pallywood" (a portmanteau of "Palestine" and "Hollywood") is a disinformation campaign used to falsely accuse Palestinians for faking suffering and civilian deaths during their conflict with Israel. The term came into currency following the killing of Muhammad al-Durrah in 2000 during the Second Intifada, involving a challenge to the veracity of photographic evidence. Israeli pundits have used the term to dismiss videos showing Israeli violence or denial of Palestinian suffering. During the Gaza war, it has been used to dismiss Palestinian suffering such as claiming dead Palestinian babies are fake dolls, and has been described by some authors as a conspiracy theory. The term has been used as a propaganda and disinformation tool by Israeli government officials.

=== Muslim collusion with the Nazis ===
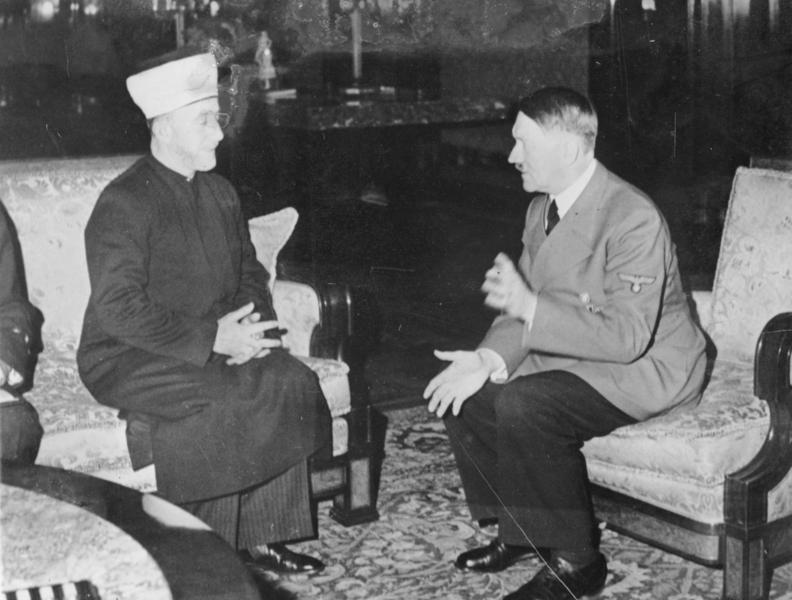
The overemphasis some politicians place on this image – of Amin al-Husseini and Adolf Hitler in 1941 – has been criticized by Holocaust historians and by Yad Vashem Holocaust memorial.

Benjamin Netanyahu, Prime Minister of Israel and leader of the Likud party, (Note: See also: Likud § Shamir and Netanyahu's first term and Lehi (militant group) § Nazi Germany) has been accused of Holocaust revisionism for his claim that the Palestinian Grand Mufti of Jerusalem, Haj Amin al-Husseini, gave Hitler the idea for The Final Solution. The cause of the Holocaust was European antisemitism, not external influences from the Middle East. However, Husseini did personally meet with and support Hitler and Nazism. In 2022 there was a heated dispute about displaying a floor to ceiling photo of this meeting between the Mufti and Hitler in Yad Vashem. Netanyahu wanted it displayed, but Yad Vashem's chairman Dani Dayan refused. The New York Times (NYT) reported that Netanyahu retracted the remarks, but that in the process he "went further". The NYT pointed out that he directly contradicted a speech he gave earlier that month. (Note: Amin al-Husseini attempted to obtain support from Germany, but so did the predecessors of Netanyahu's Likud party. The Lehi martyrs memorial page openly admits this and attempts to explain their reasons.)

Netanyahu and other leaders of the Likud party have repeatedly compared Palestinians to Nazis to justify the preemptive use of deadly force, sometimes on a massive scale.

=== Recycling of antisemitic and Nazi tropes ===
During the COVID-19 pandemic in India, in the aftermath of a Tablighi Jamaat event in Delhi being classified as a superspreader of the disease, many social media accounts operated by the BJP IT cell spread fake news about Muslim vegetable sellers and fruit vendors selling food items contaminated with their own saliva or other bodily fluids in an attempt to deliberately spread the viral infection among Hindus in an attempted act of biological terrorism, drawing on the medieval European antisemitic trope of well-poisoning. This accusation led to incidents of police vigilantism against Muslim shop owners in BJP-ruled Uttar Pradesh, purportedly on the orders of its Chief Minister, the hardliner Hindutva cleric Yogi Adityanath.

In 2022, BJP leader and Assamese Chief Minister Himanta Biswa Sarma accused the Muslim minority of 'flood jihad'; orchestrating man-made floods in the low-lying Hindu-majority areas of the Brahmaputra Valley by deliberately accelerating deforestation and environmental degradation in the surrounding mountains of Meghalaya, similar to how in 2018, a lawmaker from Washington DC accused the Rothschild family of causing heavy snowfall in the area via 'climate manipulation'.

During the COVID-19 pandemic, there were some isolated incidents of Muslims being denied medical aid by Hindu medical professionals in some BJP ruled states, similar to how German doctors were prohibited from treating Jewish patients. Calls for the boycott of Muslim businesses by Hindus on grounds of their alleged disloyalty to the country and alleged earlier calls by some Muslim clerics to boycott Hindu businesses (similar to how Nazi boycott of Jewish businesses was instituted in response to Jewish boycott of German goods) have also been raised by BJP leaders in recent times.

In 2025, Hindu godman and entrepreneur Baba Ramdev, while promoting products of his brand, called upon Hindus to boycott the popular sharbat brand Rooh Afza (owned by a Muslim entrepreneur family) by spreading rumors pertaining to 'sharbat jihad', alleging that the brand's Muslim owners are using their sales revenue to undermine Hindu culture by financing the construction of mosques and madrasas.

=== Lying to non-Muslims ===
The taqiyya trope is an Islamophobic misrepresentation that falsely claims Muslims have a religious permission to deceive non-Muslims. This conspiracy theory is often used to argue that Muslims cannot be trusted, particularly in political, legal, and security contexts. The trope has been spread by far-right figures, anti-Muslim activists, and some political leaders to justify discrimination against Muslims and opposition to their participation in public life.

The Islamic concept of taqiyya originates from early Islamic history and refers to a religious dispensation allowing Muslims to conceal their faith when facing extreme persecution or mortal danger. Historically, it was primarily practiced by Shia Muslims in situations where revealing their religious beliefs could result in death or oppression. Despite its limited historical application, Islamophobic discourse has distorted taqiyya into a blanket accusation that all Muslims are permitted—or even required—to lie to non-Muslims for strategic advantage.

The trope has also been circulated on social media and far-right websites, where it is used to dismiss any peaceful or conciliatory statements by Muslim individuals as deceptive. Islamophobic groups such as Britain First, ACT for America, and the Identitarian movement have promoted taqiyya as proof that Muslims are waging a "stealth jihad" to infiltrate Western institutions.

Belief in the taqiyya trope has fueled hate crimes and vigilante violence against Muslims. In 2015, an anti-Muslim extremist in the U.S. cited taqiyya as a justification for harassing Muslim store owners, claiming they were "lying about being peaceful." In 2017, far-right groups in Germany spread the false claim that Muslim refugees were using taqiyya to disguise their true extremist beliefs, leading to increased attacks on asylum seekers.

== Muslims as violent figures ==
The stereotype that Muslims are inherently violent or predisposed to terrorism is a common Islamophobic trope, often used to justify discrimination, surveillance, and restrictive policies against Muslim communities. This belief is frequently reinforced through selective reporting, media bias, and decontextualized interpretations of Islamic texts. The trope falsely portrays Islam as a uniquely violent religion, despite historical and contemporary violence committed by individuals of various religious and ideological backgrounds.

Terrorist attacks committed by Muslims receive far more media coverage than those by non-Muslims, even when controlling for target type, number of fatalities, and other factors. This media coverage is often followed by violence against Muslims, including at locations a long way away from the terror attack. Political leaders have also played a role in spreading this narrative, with figures such as Donald Trump, during his first term as U.S. president, advocating for a Muslim ban by citing terrorism concerns.

This trope has been used to justify increased surveillance and profiling of Muslim communities. The NYPD's post-9/11 surveillance program specifically targeted Muslims, monitoring mosques, Muslim-owned businesses, and student groups without evidence of criminal activity.

This trope has been used to justify discriminatory policies targeting Muslims worldwide. In India, Hindu nationalist rhetoric frequently frames Muslims as violent "invaders," fueling religious riots and lynchings of Muslims accused of eating beef or engaging in "love jihad" (a conspiracy theory that Muslim men seek to convert Hindu women through marriage). In China, the Chinese government has justified the internment of over a million Uyghur Muslims in so-called "re-education" camps by labeling them as security threats and extremists.

=== Violence against children ===
Stories about Muslims killing children often receive disproportionate media attention in non-Muslim countries. Some are real events that are given disproportionate coverage, but others are proven to be complete fabrications, or not committed by Muslims. Like the corresponding antisemitic trope, the stories have been used to incite violence against Muslims. Such as in the 2024 United Kingdom riots, from July till 5 August 2024, far-right, anti-immigration protests and riots occurred in England and Northern Ireland, within the United Kingdom. This followed a mass stabbing of girls at a dance party in Southport on 29 July in which three children were killed. The riots were fuelled by false claims circulated by far-right groups that the perpetrator of the attack was a Muslim and an asylum seeker, in addition to broader Islamophobic, racist, and anti-immigrant sentiments that had grown leading up to the protests. The disorder included racist attacks, arson, and looting and was the largest incident of social unrest in England since 2011.

Sometimes the retaliations include violence against children on a much larger scale that the inciting incident(s). Israeli soldiers, the Israeli Forces, and the first responder Israeli organization ZAKA said on French Israeli TV channel i24news that they had seen the bodies of beheaded infants at the site of the Kfar Aza massacre. This claim was repeated by U.S. President Biden separately, who stated that he "had seen photographic evidence of terrorists beheading children". NBC News called reports of "40 beheaded babies" unverified allegations, adding that they appeared "to have originated from Israeli soldiers and people affiliated with the Israel Defense Force" and that "an Israeli official told CNN the government had not confirmed claims of the beheadings". The allegation mainly "stemmed from a viral Israeli news broadcast clip" and the main X / Twitter accounts propagating the claims were i24NEWS and Israel's official account, even though Israeli Defense spokesperson Doron Spielman told NBC News that he could not confirm i24NEWS's report. In a speech to the Republican Jewish Coalition on 28 October, Eli Beer, founder of Israeli volunteer EMS group United Hatzalah, claimed that Hamas had burned a baby alive in an oven, with many journalists sharing the claim in tweets seen over 10 million times. Israeli journalists and police found no evidence for the claim, and a representative of ZAKA, a first responder organization, said the claim was "false". On 4 December 2023, Haaretz reported on Israeli claims about beheaded babies, stating that these "unverified stories [had been] disseminated by Israeli search and rescue groups, army officers and even Sara Netanyahu". (Note: The false claims that babies were beheaded in the Hamas assault were not promoted only by Israeli civilians or rescue volunteers, but also by the government. Le Monde has stated: "Israel has done nothing to fight it and has more often tried to instrumentalize it than deny it, fueling accusations of media manipulation".)

== Martyrdom ==
One of the most prevalent Islamophobic tropes is the distortion of the Islamic concept of martyrdom. The word "Shaheed" (Arabic: شهيد) or "Shahid" (Persian: شهید) has been adopted into some varieties of English from the Arabic word for martyr. (Note: "Shaheed" in Commonwealth English and among English speaking Muslims. From Arabic.: Arabic: شهيد, romanized: shaheed, lit. 'male martyr'.; Arabic: شهيدة, romanized: shaheeda, lit. 'female martyr'.; "Shahid" in Israeli English, from Arabic, via Modern Hebrew.: Male singular Hebrew: שהיד, romanized: shahid.; Female singular Hebrew: שהידה, romanized: shahida.) Among Muslims and in some other cultures the word retains a similar or broader meaning.

However, in some places where Muslims and non-Muslims are in conflict words derived from the Arabic "shaheed" have been given strong negative meanings or have become an Islamophobic slur. The word "Shahid" has been recently adopted in Modern Hebrew and Israeli English (Hebrew: שהיד, romanized: Shahid), as a loanword from Palestinian Arabic and according to Haaretz the word "Shahid" has become "synonymous" with "terrorist" among Hebrew speakers in Israel since the suicide bombings of the 1990s.

== 72 virgins trope ==
72 virgins refers to the idea that a martyr will get "72 virgins" in paradise. The "72 virgins" do not appear in the Quran; they are a simplified translation of lesser texts and commentaries, such as hadith, that usually refer to houris rather than "virgins". In the Quran, Houris are, however, described as being "untouched by man" that are to marry the faithful. Houris are also described as buxom maidens who look only at their husbands, of equal age to their partner.

Al-Tirmidhi reports in one of the six canonical hadith compilations in Sunni Islam that martyrs are granted "seventy two wives."

Another canonical hadith, Sunan ibn Majah relates that “There is no one whom Allah will admit to Paradise but Allah will marry him to seventy-two wives, two from houris and seventy from his inheritance from the people of Hell, all of whom will have desirable front passages and he will have a male member that never becomes flaccid (i.e., soft and limp).’”

There is a common belief – in Western countries and Israel – that Muslim men are enthusiastic about dying in battle because they believe that they will be rewarded with "72 virgins" in heaven. This is often used to explain suicide attacks, and dismiss other possible motivations based on politics or personal circumstances. As'ad AbuKhalil, has stated that "the tendency to dwell on the sexual motives" of the suicide bombers "belittles" the bombers "sociopolitical causes", and that the alleged "sexual frustration" of young Muslim men "has been overly emphasized in the Western and Israeli media" as a motive for terrorism.

=== Translation issues ===
Some reports of suicide bombers supposedly mentioning "virgins" waiting for them in heaven have allegedly been mistranslated. Some scholars say that the word used in the original Arabic has no connotation of gender and may be more accurately translated as 'angel' or 'heavenly being'. Christoph Luxenberg, in his German language book "The Syro-Aramaic Reading of the Koran" (German: Die Syro-Aramaische Lesart des Koran, published in 2000), claimed that the word for Houris meant white raisins, based on translating the Arabic word as if it was a word in Syriac Aramaic. This interpretation has repeatedly caused media storms, and Walid Saleh describes Luxenberg's method as "so idiosyncratic, so inconsistent, that it is simply impossible to keep his line of argument straight." He adds that according to Luxenberg, for the last two hundred years, Western scholars "have totally misread the Qur'ān" and that, ad hominem, no one can understand the Qur'an as "only he can fret out for us the Syrian skeleton of this text." Summing up his assessment of Luxenberg's method, he states:

The first fundamental premise of his approach, that the Qur'ān is a Syriac text, is the easiest to refute on linguistic evidence. Nothing in the Qur'ān is Syriac, even the Syriac borrowed terms are Arabic, in so far as they now Arabized and used inside an Arabic linguistic medium. Luxenberg is pushing the etymological fallacy to its natural conclusion. The Qur'ān not only is borrowing words according to Luxenberg, it is speaking a gibberish language.

The translation of the "Koran" (Qur'an) by N. J. Dawood, published as a Penguin paperback, describes houris as "chaste" and "virgins". Dawood was a native speaker of Arabic but not a Muslim or a religious scholar. Ziauddin Sardar, criticized Dawood's translation as containing "distortions that give the Qur'an violent and sexist overtones", in a comparison to a modern translation by Tarif Khalidi, describing Dawood's translation as "largely responsible for the current misconception that Muslim paradise is full of "virgins" - despite the fact that the Qur'an explicitly denies any carnal pleasures in paradise".

Dawood's knowledge of the Arabic language is extensive and respected, and he also translated government documents, but him not being Muslim has made his translation controversial. Many Muslims believe that fully capturing the meaning of the Quran in any other language is impossible and it should only be attempted by a Muslim who understands the religion.

=== Bin Laden's declaration of war ===
Western media speculation of about the motives of suicide bombers surged after the 2001 September 11 attacks in the United States. This included the 72 virgins story. One of the earliest appearances of the "72 virgins" trope is in a post 9/11 American English translation of a 1996 statement by Osama bin Laden. The Hadith reference was a minor point in a long manifesto that outlined his grievances with the United States. This 1996 statement by Bin Laden is usually entitled "Declaration of War against the Americans Occupying the Land of the Two Holy Places", but the document is also sometimes called the Ladenese epistle, a term derived from bin Laden's nasab. It is a long piece, and complains of American activities in numerous countries. It was faxed to Arabic-language newspapers internationally. It first appeared in the London-based Arabic paper Al-Quds Al-Arabi.

"The martyr has a guarantee from God: He forgives him at the first drop of his blood and shows him his seat in Heaven. He decorates him with the jewels of faith, protects him from the torment of the grave, keeps him safe on the day of judgment, places a crown of dignity on his head with the finest rubies in the world, marries him to seventy-two of the pure virgins of paradise and intercedes on behalf of seventy of his relatives," as related by Ahmad al-Tirmidhi in an authoritative hadith.

— "Osama bin Laden's Declaration of Jihad against Americans".

Other translations of the Hadith, even in translations of the same manifesto, do not use sexual language:

"a martyr privileges are guaranteed by Allah; forgiveness with the first gush of his blood, he will be shown his seat in paradise, he will be decorated with the jewels of belief (Imaan), married off to the beautiful ones, protected from the test in the grave, assured security in the day of judgement, crowned with the crown of dignity, a ruby of which is better than this whole world (Duniah) and its entire content, wedded to seventy two of the pure Houries (beautiful ones of Paradise) and his intercession on the behalf of seventy of his relatives will be accepted".

— Osama bin Laden, "Declaration of War against the Americans Occupying the Land of the Two Holy Places", first published in Al Quds Al Arabi, in August 1996.

Other parts of the 1996 manifesto are less often quoted, such as: "It should not be hidden from you that the people of Islam had suffered from aggression, iniquity and injustice imposed on them by the Zionist-Crusaders alliance and their collaborators; to the extent that the Muslims blood became the cheapest and their wealth as loot in the hands of the enemies. Their blood was spilled in Palestine and Iraq. The horrifying pictures of the massacre of Qana, in Lebanon are still fresh in our memory. Massacres in Tajakestan, Burma, Cashmere, Assam, Philippine, Fatani, Ogadin, Somalia, Eritrea, Chechnia, and in Bosnia-Herzegovina took place, massacres that send shivers in the body and shake the conscience … All false claims and propaganda about 'Human Rights' were hammered down and exposed by the massacres that took place against the Muslims in every part of the world". Similar sentiments in other al-Qaeda propaganda gained heated attention when bin-Laden's Letter to the American People suddenly went viral on TikTok in 2023. Most media attributed it to TikTok but closer analysis showed Twitter might have been responsible for the spread.

=== Media using the 72 virgins trope ===
==== Seventy-Two Virgins (2004 Boris Johnson novel) ====
Seventy-Two Virgins was the title of a novel by UK Conservative Party politician Boris Johnson. Pink News described the novel as having ‘racist, misogynistic, homophobic’ references, such as describing Arabs with "hook noses" and "slanty eyes".

==== 72 Hoorain (July 2023 Hindi film) ====
In June 2023, in response to the release of the Hindi language movie 72 Hoorain, Chicago-based Muslim scholar, Yasir Nadeem al Wajidi released a video on Twitter addressing misconceptions about Muslims and terrorism. He challenged the notion that global terrorism is driven by the promise of "72 Hoorain", emphasizing that such incidents constitute only a small fraction of global violence. He argued that while extremist groups like ISIS and Al-Qaeda are universally condemned by Muslims as terrorists, other violent mobs, especially those targeting Muslims, are often not labeled as terrorists. The movie had a simultaneous release in over a dozen languages including English and Indian regional languages.

==== 72 Virgins – Uncensored (2023 Telegram channel) ====
The most notable use of the 72 virgins trope was the Israel Defense Forces (IDF) psychological warfare unit's Hebrew language Telegram channel named "72 Virgins – Uncensored". The channel shared graphic images and videos of Palestinians taken in the Gaza Strip. The Telegram channel was run by the Israeli military psychological warfare division starting on 9 October 2023, shared graphic images and videos of Palestinians taken in Gaza. The name is a reference to the Islamophobic trope of Muslim combatants being motivated primarily by rewards in the afterlife, including the "72 virgins" in heaven. The channel originally presented itself as independent, but due to its privileged access to videos and images taken by soldiers, it was discovered to be run by the psychological warfare division of the IDF. The channel was shut down for operating against policy by targeting Israelis, with the unit's usual role being to target enemy and other international audiences. The Wire described the channel as "racist", for using language like, "Roaches to Be Exterminated".

A previous channel that presented itself as independent also turned out to be linked to the IDF. In 2021, Israeli newspaper Haaretz revealed that "Abu Ali Express", a popular news page on Telegram and Twitter purportedly dedicated to "Arab affairs", was actually run by a Jewish Israeli paid consultant to the Israel Defense Forces (IDF).

==== The 72 virgins trope in news media ====
The phrase "72 virgins" is occasionally used figuratively in political news about non-Muslim countries.

Media outlets aimed at non-Muslim audiences often quotes Islamic preachers or people accused of terrorism talking about "72 virgins", particularly media aggregator websites like the Middle East Media Research Institute and Palwatch. The "72 virgins" are also sometimes also mentioned in statements by militaries and associated academics.

A 2014 article in The Telegraph said that imams and Islamic extremist groups have cited this myth as a recruitment tool. According to The Christian Post, a former member, the Islamic State (IS) taught that if a militant died for IS, they would get 72 eternal virgins as a reward. IS also holds that if a female kills an IS militant, the militant forfeits the virigins in heaven. Similarly, according to a Nigerian Army officer, Boko Haram promised the suspected perpetrators of the Suleja bombing 72 virgins each, this officer claimed this information was from seized records of the suspects.

The trope is particularly commonly used in reference to Palestinian militant groups. In an interview that The Independent described as "an interview in the newspaper Yediot Aharonot, which was granted access to the boy by his Israeli captors", a 14-year-old Palestinian child named Hussam Abdo said that he attempted a suicide bombing because he was bullied for his short stature in school and because he wanted the martyr's rewards in heaven, including the 72 virgins. Abdo also told the Israeli newspaper that he learned the martyr's rewards from a teacher in his school in Nablus, his hometown. Israeli counter terrorism researcher Assaf Moghadam has claimed that, Palestinian Islamic Jihad framed the funeral of one of their militants who got killed in militant operations as the militant's wedding to the 72 virgins.

Palestinian Media Watch (an Israeli media outlet dedicated to monitoring Palestinians), reported on their English language website that Ashraf Nafea, a 17-year-old who was the commander of Hamas's Izz al-Din al-Qassam Brigades in Tulkarm, rejected marrying earthly women in favor of becoming a "martyr" by dying in Hamas militant operations against Israel and marrying 72 heavenly virgins as a reward, according to a eulogy delivered by his aunt. At age 17, Nafea was killed in an Israeli drone strike on 23 July 2024. This eulogy was broadcast on official Palestinian Authority television.

PalWatch also shared a video of a young Palestinian girl reciting a poem on a children's program on an official Palestinian Authority TV which PalWatch said glorified child militants who intended to die in militant operations against Israel and stated that such militants would earn 72 virgins in heaven as a reward. The host lauded and applauded the girl for reciting the poem. The girl recited the poem in front of a live studio audience, which also applauded the girl after she finished her recitation. (Note: Curriculum units in Israel about pre-state militant martyrs – who were hung for terrorism or blew themselves up – also use poetry and creative writing. An expanded unit on this topic was introduced by the Likud-led government in 2009.)

=== Academic research ===
According to some researchers the story of the 72 virgins promised to suicide bombers in paradise is a myth with no basis in Islam, and it is an Islamophobic trope. The majority of Palestinian suicide bombers are educated and not driven by economic despair. Furthermore, Jihadi leaders themselves reject candidates who seek self-sacrifice for rewards like virgins, as these individuals are considered unfit for such missions. Instead, suicide bombers are typically selected for their ideological commitment, patience, and planning abilities. The 72 virgins trope is not relevant to Palestinian religious life, and instead has often been perpetuated by western media. Muslim scholars emphasize that it is not part of Islamic teachings.

Scott Atran, a cultural anthropologist researching terrorism, argued against the narrative that suicide bombers are primarily motivated by the belief in rewards such as 72 virgins. In his research and interviews with jihadi leaders, Atran asserts that he has never encountered a case where suicide bombers were driven by such beliefs, emphasizing that if anyone were to approach jihadi leaders seeking martyrdom for the promise of virgins, the door would immediately be "slammed in their face".

Political scientist Robert Pape stated in a study of over 2,200 suicide attacks carried out over a 30-year period that 95% of these attacks had nothing to do with promises of 72 virgins or heavenly rewards. Instead, they were a response to foreign occupation; 90% of the attacks were anti-American and occurred in regions under U.S. occupation. The study also noted a dramatic decline in suicide bombings in Israel after the country withdrew from Gaza and parts of the West Bank. Pape argued that suicide bombing is primarily driven by cultural divides, and the failure of other forms of resistance, with suicide bombing emerging as a last resort.

A study of dehumanizing social media memes about Muslims found "72 virgins" referenced in extremely offensive memes.

One of the only academics who says that on "72 virgins" are a key motive for Islamic militants is Assaf Moghadam, from Reichman University in Israel and the Combating Terrorism Center (CTC) at the West Point United States military college. Moghadam and a small number of other researchers say Palestinians who are willing to die in attacks on Israelis are motivated by the promise of rewards in the afterlife that are described in Islamic teachings and various hadiths. These rewards include forgiveness of sins, protection from hell, a crown of glory, marriage to seventy-two virgins (houris), and the ability to extend these privileges to seventy relatives. Moghadam claims these expected rewards create a strong incentive for individuals to undertake martyrdom, viewing it as a way to trade their limited earthly possessions for the luxurious rewards promised in paradise. Moghadam has published academic articles saying that many suicidal militants are convinced of these rewards, which significantly influences their willingness to undertake suicide missions. One paper by Moghadam claimed there has been at least one case of a suicide bomber taking steps, like wrapping toilet paper around his genitals, and interpreted this as an action to preserve his ability to enjoy these rewards in the afterlife, discounting other possible explanations. Similar claims circulating on social media have been debunked. Moghadam also claims that Palestinian media has framed martyrdom in terms of marriage to virgins.

== Oppression of women ==
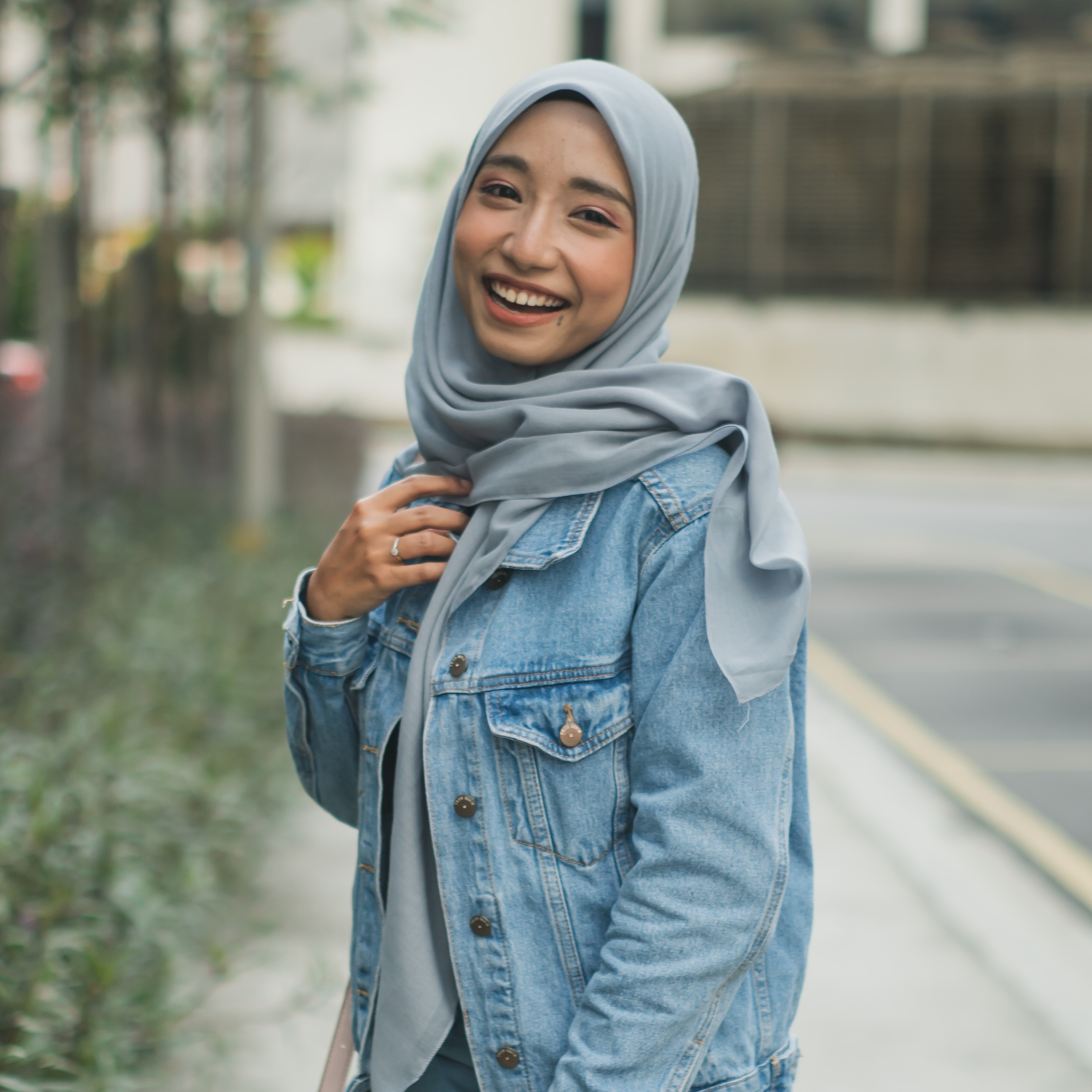
A Muslim woman from Malaysia wearing a hijab.

Scholars of Islamophobia describe a recurring stereotype that depicts Muslim women as oppressed by Islamic teachings and by Muslim men. The "Islam oppresses women" trope and other tropes like "Islam is a misogynistic religion", "Islam kills women" and "Islam is anti-women" are a widespread Islamophobic narratives often used to justify discriminatory policies, foreign interventions, and anti-Muslim sentiment, while overlooking the diversity of Muslim women's experiences and the historical, political, and social factors that shape gender relations in Muslim-majority societies.

The image of the “oppressed Muslim woman” has roots in Orientalist discourse, where European colonial powers portrayed Muslim societies as inherently patriarchal to legitimise political and moral intervention. During the 19th and early 20th centuries, colonial authorities invoked the rhetoric of “saving” Muslim women—especially in territories such as North Africa and South Asia—as part of their civilising mission. This framing continues in some modern political rhetoric, where Western leaders have cited the supposed oppression of Muslim women to support policies such as military intervention or immigration restrictions.

Debates over Islamic dress—such as the hijab, chador, niqab, and burqa—are central to this stereotype. These garments are frequently represented as symbols of submission. While coercion does occur in some contexts, many Muslim women wear them voluntarily for personal, cultural, or religious reasons. Assuming that all veiled women are oppressed disregards individual autonomy and ignores the presence of modest dress traditions in other faiths, including Christianity and Judaism.

Media studies research indicates that Western outlets often highlight incidents of gender-based violence in Muslim-majority contexts while underreporting comparable issues elsewhere. Honor killings, forced marriages, and domestic violence are sometimes depicted as intrinsic to Islam, despite Islam's prohibition of these practices and their presence across cultures and religions.

These ideas have influenced laws and public policies. France, Belgium, and Switzerland have enacted bans on full-face coverings such as the burqa, limiting women's freedom to dress in accordance with their beliefs. In India, Hindu nationalist rhetoric associated with the ruling Bharatiya Janata Party has portrayed Muslim personal laws as oppressive toward women to justify legislative reforms, including the abolition of triple talaq and proposals for a uniform civil code. Critics argue that these reforms amount to state interference in Muslim religious affairs and coincide with policies perceived as discriminatory, such as the 2019 Citizenship Amendment Act.

Studies in the United States, the United Kingdom, and Canada show that visibly Muslim women face higher rates of harassment and violence than Muslim men. Reports document that women wearing headscarves have been denied employment, education, or access to public services. Analysts have observed that far-right and nationalist movements in Europe and North America have exploited this stereotype to promote anti-immigrant and anti-Muslim agendas. Following the 2015 European migrant crisis and the Cologne sexual assaults, several far-right groups circulated exaggerated or fabricated stories of attacks by Muslim migrants to portray Muslim men as threats to women's safety and to advocate stricter immigration laws. This was also observed in the case of the United Kingdom grooming gangs scandal.

Some scholars emphasise that patriarchal practices in certain Muslim-majority societies stem from cultural or political conditions rather than Islamic doctrine. Others highlight reform movements led by Muslim women that interpret Islam as a source of empowerment and social justice. Together, these perspectives demonstrate that Muslim women's experiences cannot be represented through a single narrative of oppression.

== Homophobia and transphobia ==
=== European far-right ===
Marine Le Pen, president of the French far-right political party National Rally in France, was gaining support from LGBTQ communities in the presidential election, despite the fact that Jean-Marie Le Pen, her father and the founder of the party, once condemned homosexuality as "a biological and social anomaly". After the Orlando nightclub shooting, Marine Le Pen declared "how much homosexuality is attacked in countries that live under the Islamist jackboot". Facing these threats and receiving "sympathy" from Le Pen, some LGBTQ voters started to advocate for the far-right party, with one supporter stating that "they'll be the first victims of these barbarians, and only Marine is proposing radical solutions".

=== Israeli public diplomacy and pro-Israel commentary ===
Israeli public diplomacy uses accusations of extreme homophobia in an attempt to discourage progressives from sympathising with Palestinian Muslims. According to a study by American think tank Pew Research Center, 93% of Palestinians are opposed to homosexuality, and many queer Palestinians have sought temporary asylum in Israel. In 2019, the PA banned the LGBTQ group Al Qaws in the West Bank. Culture studies academic Nada Elia calls pinkwashing "the twenty-first century manifestation of the Zionist colonialist narrative of bringing civilisation to an otherwise backwards land". After the 2011 Gaza Freedom Flotilla, an Israeli actor created a misleading video in which he pretended to have been turned away from the flotilla because he was LGBTQ. The video was promoted by the Israeli prime minister's office. Joseph Massad, associate professor of modern Arab politics and intellectual history at Columbia University, has written that the Israeli government "insist[s] on advertising and exaggerating its recent record on LGBT rights ... to fend off international condemnation of its violations of the rights of the Palestinian people". Israeli public diplomacy, and sometimes their internal propaganda, uses accusations of extreme homophobia in an attempt to discourage progressives from sympathising with Palestinian Muslims. However, the right wing Israelis who are most strongly hostile towards Palestinians are often religious extremists who are themselves extremely homophobic. Such as Minister for National Security Itamar Ben-Gvir, Finance Minister, the anti-LGBT Noam political party, and the Lehava movement who oppose both gay relationships and interfaith relationships. In 2017, Lehava protested the Jerusalem gay pride parade. Prior to the 2018 march, Gopstein called LGBT activists "terrorists" and urged supporters to counterdemonstrate with banners saying "Jerusalem is not Sodom". Four Lehava supporters were arrested during the parade. In 2020, Lehava urged its supporters to infiltrate the parade.

==== Eretz Nehederet Queers for Palestine sketch ====
On 5 November 2023, "Eretz Nehederet" aired a skit mocking the "Woke" culture on university campuses in the United States, claiming that they support Hamas militants. The skit showed two queer activists, from the "Queers for Palestine" movement at Columbia University, depicted in a demeaning and stereotyped way, who supportively talk to a Hamas militant, who speaks openly about his desire to murder Jews and LGBT people. The militant says, "we will throw you from the roof, you homosexual dirt!" but the stereotyped characters continue to praise him and offer him material support. This references a specific piece of disinformation that was used by supporters of Israel numerous times elsewhere. Other instances of this disinformation tactic used images of ISIS in Mosul, but misrepresented it as being an image of Hamas in Gaza, allegedly throwing queer people from a building. There have been real public executions in Gaza, but only for murder and treason, (Note: Treason is almost always "Collaboration with hostile entities" outlawed by Article 131(1) of the 1979 Revolutionary Penal Code, a law that pre-dates Hamas, but is no longer officially enforced by the Ramallah-based faction of Palestine's split government.) and the executions are done by hanging or firing squad. Human rights activists in Gaza very actively oppose the death penalty. In another sketch, "Greta Tunberry" (a parody of Greta Thunberg) is shown with friends waving signs in support of Hamas - LGBT and Jewish, and a "Smurf" who displays a sign that says "supports Gargamel". Gargamel is an alleged antisemitic caricature, and is the main enemy of the Smurfs in the cartoon.

==== Hyperboles and misattributions about violence ====
Hamas' Al-Qassam Brigades militant wing have been credibly accused of numerous war crimes including various extrajudicial killings, but commonly told stories about executions in the Gaza Strip have been over simplified, exaggerated, distorted, or completely fabricated. For example, during the Gaza war, a video described as "Hamas executes people by throwing them off a roof of a building!" circulated on social media, but the video was from 2015 and not from Palestine. A July 2015 report from Al Arabiya, included identical images and stated that they were originally shared by the ISIS, and showed the execution of four gay men in Fallujah, Iraq. Same sex sexual behaviour is not officially or typically a capital crime in the Gaza Strip. The only crimes that routinely attract the death penalty are treason and murder. No laws currently in place in the occupied Palestinian territory directly prohibit sex between consenting adult women. But there are differences between the Gaza Strip and West Bank governments regarding the legal status of sex between consenting adult men. The laws against homosexual behavior between men in Palestine that are currently in place in the Gaza Strip are a relic of British colonial rule in Palestine. There is some ambiguity and debate about whether homosexuality was decriminalized in 1858, during the Ottoman period that preceded the British. The British colonial laws that have been in place in the Gaza Strip specify a maximum sentence of 10 or 14 years in prison. There is very little evidence that these laws are actually enforced in Gaza. Some interpretations of the laws say that it does not outlaw consensual gay sex between adults at all. In 2018, Anis. F. Kassim (editor-in-chief of the Palestinian Yearbook of International Law) said that Palestinian law (even in Gaza) could be interpreted as allowing non-commercial sex between consenting adult men.

== Denialism and criticism ==
Some individuals or groups argue that Islamophobia does not exist or that it is a fabricated or exaggerated concept. Common assertions include statements such as "There’s no such thing as Islamophobia", "Islamophobia doesn’t exist", "Islamophobia is a made-up word", or "There's no Islamophobia". These claims often dismiss documented instances of anti-Muslim prejudice, discrimination, or hostility, framing the term as a rhetorical tool rather than a descriptor of real-world phenomena. Critics of this denialism argue that such statements may minimize or obscure systemic biases and acts of intolerance directed toward Muslims. This is sometimes called 'Islamophobia denial'.

== In popular culture ==
=== North America ===
Throughout the twentieth century, Hollywood films have often portrayed Muslim characters negatively, making use of Orientalist stereotypes and depicting such characters as being "uncivilised". In addition to these tropes, the securitization of Muslims, portraying them as a threat to the Western world, has drastically increased in movie depictions since the post-9/11 era.

Alex Stein – a comedian and professional agitator from the United States – engaged in a one-man parody activism campaign mocking LGBTQ advocacy in the Gaza war.

Shiny Happy Jihad – 2007 stand up album by Joe Rogan.

=== South Asia ===
Islamophobia may be observed in Hindi cinema ("Bollywood"), in films such as Tanhaji (2020), The Kashmir Files (2022), The Kerala Story (2023), Chhava (2025) & The Bengal Files (2025).

=== West Asia ===
Eretz Nehederet is an Israeli TV program that uses Islamophobic tropes to mock Palestinians. It also uses homophobic and misogynistic tropes to mock western progressives who criticize Israel's treatment of Palestinians. See, Israeli public diplomacy in the Gaza war § Eretz Nehederet sketches and "Queers for Palestine sketch" (above).

=== Western Europe ===
Seventy-Two Virgins – 2004 comic political novel by Boris Johnson (see above).

== See also ==
- 1984 anti-Sikh riots
- Anti-Arab racism
- Anti-Muslim violence
- Anti-Palestinian racism
- Antisemitic tropes
- Criticism of Islam
- Hasbara
- Hindutva
- Islamo-leftism
- Islamophobia in the media
- Pallywood
- Persecution of Muslims
- Post–Cold War persecution of Christians
- Persecution of Muslims in Myanmar
- Persecution of Uyghurs in China
- Terrorgram
