= Muhammad Shahdaat Bin Sayeed =

Bangladeshi young scientist

- Occupation: University Academic

Muhammad Shahdaat Bin Sayeed was a lecturer in Clinical Pharmacy and Pharmacology at the University of Dhaka, Bangladesh. He was also the International Brain Bee coordinator for Bangladesh.

== Career ==
Muhammad Shahdaat Bin Sayeed discovered a new cognitive enhancer that led him to win the Association of Commonwealth Universities Early Career Award in 2013. His discovery had been extensively discussed worldwide, and he had been interviewed by the US lifestyle magazine Prevention.

In 2014, he participated in the 64th Lindau Nobel Laureate Meeting in Germany where he was selected as a Bayer Lindau fellow and presented his work. Over the course of his career, he received many awards from countries including the United States, the United Kingdom, Australia, Germany, France, Italy, Belgium, Japan, Singapore, Taiwan, Iran, Malaysia, and others recognising his exceptional contributions to research.

He was a Fulbright scholar and completed a master's with a Thesis from the University of Toledo, Ohio, USA. He later received the Australian Government Research and Training Scholarship to pursue doctoral studies at the Australian National University, where he completed his PhD in Population Health.

His research publications span a wide range of fields, including those on cardiovascular disease, cognitive enhancer, cancer, pharmacogenetics, neurotoxicology etc. He has authored numerous peer-reviewed journal papers as well as several book chapters.
