= Shohada, Yazd =

Shohada شهدا
- Village
- Location within Iran
- Coordinates: 31°46′26″N 54°34′05″E
- Country: Iran
- Province: Yazd
- County: Yazd
- Bakhsh: Central
- Rural District: Fahraj

Population (2006)
  - Total: 60
- Time zone: UTC+3:30 (IRST)
  - Summer (DST): UTC+4:30 (IRDT)

Shohada (Persian: شهدا, also Romanized as Shohadā; also known as Shohadā-ye Fahraj) is a village in Fahraj Rural District, in the Central District of Yazd County, Yazd Province, Iran. At the 2006 census, its population was 60, in 13 families.
