= Shohada Metro Station =

Shohada Metro Station may refer to:

- Shohada Metro Station (Isfahan), Iran
- Shohada Metro Station (Mashhad Metro), Iran

== See also ==
- Meydan-e Shohada Metro Station, Tehran, Iran
- Shahed - Bagher Shahr Metro Station, Tehran, Iran
