= Martyrs' Square, Tehran =

Square in Tehran, Iran

Martyrs' Square
- Shohada Square
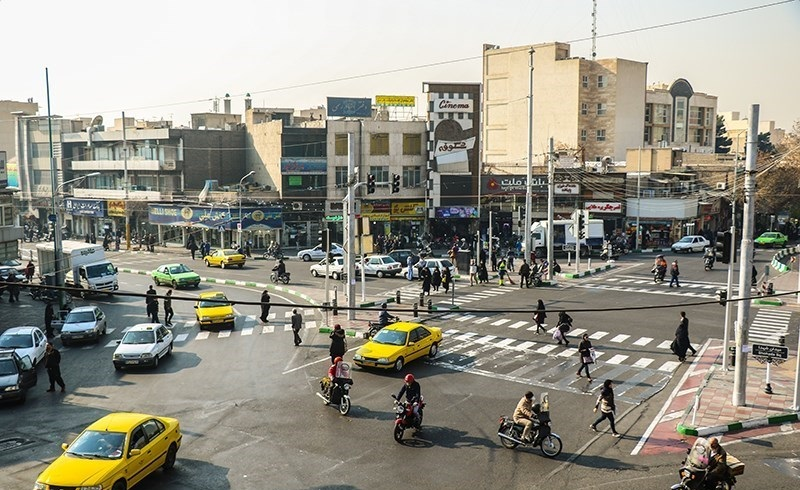
- The square in 2017
- Interactive map of Martyrs' Square
- Former name: Jaleh Square
- Location: Tehran, Iran

Other
- Designer: 35.6896°N 51.4473°E

Martyrs' Square, also known as Shohada Square, is a city square in Tehran, Iran. It was previously known as Jaleh Square, and renamed in memory of the victims (or martyrs/shahids) of the 1978 Black Friday massacre under Shah Mohammad Reza Pahlavi.

The Shokoufeh Cinema is located on the square.

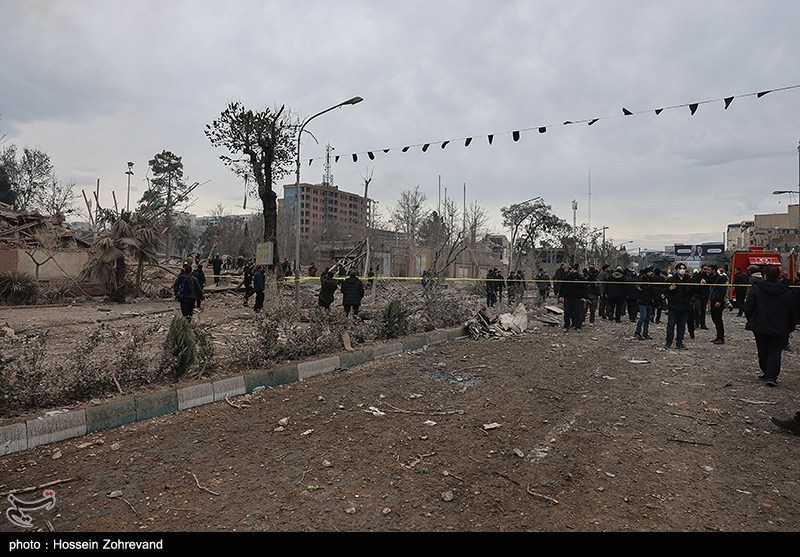
The square on March 16, 2026.

In the context of the 2026 Iran war, the square was bombed in March in part due to the presence of the Tehran Province Electricity Distribution Company.
