= Shahid, Fars =

Shahid شهيد
- Village
- Location within Iran
- Coordinates: 28°35′36″N 52°13′46″E
- Country: Iran
- Province: Fars
- County: Farashband
- Bakhsh: Dehram
- Rural District: Dehram

Population (2006)
  - Total: 321
- Time zone: UTC+3:30 (IRST)
  - Summer (DST): UTC+4:30 (IRDT)

Shahid (Persian: شهيد, also Romanized as Shahīd; also known as Shabīd and Shāhed) is a village in Dehram Rural District, Dehram District, Farashband County, Fars province, Iran. At the 2006 census, its population was 321, in 71 families.
