= May 18 =

May 18 this year in various calendars
- Monday, 18 May 2026
Akan	Nwonadwo
Armenian	2 Margach 1475
Aztec	Ochpaniztli 8, 12 Cōzcacuāuhtli
Babylonian	30 Nisanu, 2337 SE
Balinese pawukon	Menga, Beteng, Menala, Keliwon, Aryang, Coma of Wariga, Yama, Ogan, Suka
Bengali	4 Joishtho, BS 1433
Chinese	Yang Water Dragon・Net Mansion; Fire Horse Year, Month 4, Day 2 (Lixia, 3 days until Xiaoman)
Common Era	18 May 2026 CE
Coptic	10 Pashons, AM 1742
Egyptian	2 Phaophi, 2775 NE
Ethiopian	10 Genbot, 2018 Amätä Məhrät
French Republican	Décade III, Nonidi de Floréal de l'Année 234 de la République
Gregorian	18 May, AD 2026
Hebrew	2 Sivan, AM 5786; Omer 46
Hindu	Rohiṇi・Atigaṇḍa; Solar: 4 Jyeṣṭha, 1948 SE; Lunisolar: Dvitīyā, Śukla pakṣa of Adhika Jyeṣṭha, 2083 VE; Rāudra・5127 KY・1,872,713
Icelandic	Mánudagur, 26 Harpa 2026
Islamic	1 Dhu al-Hijjah, AH 1447 (using tabular method)
ISO week date	2026-W21-1
Japanese	2 Uzuki, Reiwa 8 (Rikka, 3 days until Shōman)
Julian	5 May, AD 2026 (AM 7534)
Julian day	2461179
Korean	2 Baemdal, 4359 DE
Maya	13.0.13.10.16; 9 Zip, 12 Cib
Roman	ante diem III Nonas Maias, MMDCCLXXIX AUC
Solar Hijri	28 Ordibehesht, SH 1405
Tibetan	2 sa ga, me pho rta 2153 or 1772 or 1000

<<	May					>>
Su	Mo	Tu	We	Th	Fr	Sa
					1	2
3	4	5	6	7	8	9
10	11	12	13	14	15	16
17	18	19	20	21	22	23
24	25	26	27	28	29	30
31
2026

May 18 in recent years
2026 (Monday)
2025 (Sunday)
2024 (Saturday)
2023 (Thursday)
2022 (Wednesday)
2021 (Tuesday)
2020 (Monday)
2019 (Saturday)
2018 (Friday)
2017 (Thursday)

May 18 is the 138th day of the year (139th in leap years) in the Gregorian calendar; 227 days remain until the end of the year.

== Events ==
=== Pre-1600 ===
- 332 – Emperor Constantine the Great announces free distributions of food to the citizens in Constantinople.
- 872 – Louis II of Italy is crowned for the second time as Holy Roman Emperor at Rome, at the age of 47. His first coronation was 28 years earlier, in 844, during the reign of his father Lothair I.
- 1012 – Pope Benedict VIII begins his papacy following the death of his predecessor Pope Sergius IV earlier that month.
- 1096 – First Crusade: Around 800 Jews are massacred in Worms, Germany.
- 1152 – The future Henry II of England marries Eleanor of Aquitaine. He would become king two years later, after the death of his cousin once removed King Stephen of England.
- 1268 – The Principality of Antioch, a crusader state, falls to the Mamluk Sultan Baibars in the Siege of Antioch.
- 1291 – Fall of Acre, the end of Crusader presence in the Holy Land.
- 1302 – Bruges Matins, the nocturnal massacre of the French garrison in Bruges by members of the local Flemish militia.
- 1388 – During the Battle of Buyur Lake, General Lan Yu leads a Ming army forward to crush the Mongol hordes of Tögüs Temür, the Khan of Northern Yuan.
- 1499 – Alonso de Ojeda sets sail from Cádiz on his voyage to what is now Venezuela.
- 1565 – The Great Siege of Malta begins, in which Ottoman forces attempt and fail to conquer Malta.
- 1593 – Playwright Thomas Kyd's accusations of heresy lead to an arrest warrant for Christopher Marlowe.

=== 1601–1900 ===
- 1631 – In Dorchester, Massachusetts, John Winthrop takes the oath of office and becomes the first Governor of Massachusetts.
- 1652 – Slavery in Rhode Island is abolished, although the law is not rigorously enforced.
- 1695 – The 1695 Linfen earthquake in Shannxi, Qing dynasty causes extreme damage and kills at least 52,000 people.
- 1756 – The Seven Years' War begins when Great Britain declares war on France.
- 1783 – First United Empire Loyalists reach Parrtown (later called Saint John, New Brunswick), Canada, after leaving the United States.
- 1794 – Battle of Tourcoing during the Flanders Campaign of the War of the First Coalition.
- 1803 – Napoleonic Wars: The United Kingdom revokes the Treaty of Amiens and declares war on France.
- 1804 – Napoleon Bonaparte is proclaimed Emperor of the French by the French Senate.
- 1811 – Battle of Las Piedras: The first great military triumph of the revolution of the Río de la Plata in Uruguay led by José Artigas.
- 1812 – John Bellingham is found guilty and sentenced to death by hanging for the assassination of British Prime Minister Spencer Perceval.
- 1843 – The Disruption in Edinburgh of the Free Church of Scotland from the Church of Scotland.
- 1848 – Opening of the first German National Assembly (Nationalversammlung) in Frankfurt, Germany.
- 1860 – United States presidential election: Abraham Lincoln wins the Republican Party presidential nomination over William H. Seward, who later becomes the United States Secretary of State.
- 1863 – American Civil War: Union forces under Ulysses S. Grant begin the Siege of Vicksburg during the Vicksburg campaign in order to take full control of the Mississippi River.
- 1896 – The United States Supreme Court rules in Plessy v. Ferguson that the "separate but equal" doctrine is constitutional.
- 1896 – Khodynka Tragedy: A mass panic on Khodynka Field in Moscow during the festivities of the coronation of Russian Tsar Nicholas II results in the deaths of 1,389 people.
- 1900 – The United Kingdom proclaims a protectorate over Tonga.

=== 1901–present ===
- 1912 – The first Indian film, Shree Pundalik by Dadasaheb Torne, is released in Mumbai.
- 1917 – World War I: The Selective Service Act of 1917 is passed, giving the President of the United States the power of conscription.
- 1922 – Seamus Woods and Roger McCorley lead an Irish Republican Army attack on the headquarters of the Royal Irish Constabulary in Belfast.
- 1926 – Evangelist Aimee Semple McPherson disappears in Venice, California.
- 1927 – The Bath School disaster: Forty-five people, including many children, are killed by bombs planted by a disgruntled school-board member in Bath Township, Michigan.
- 1927 – After being founded for 20 years, the Nationalist government approves Tongji University to be among its first national universities.
- 1933 – New Deal: President Franklin D. Roosevelt signs an act creating the Tennessee Valley Authority.
- 1944 – World War II: Battle of Monte Cassino: Conclusion after seven days of the fourth battle as German paratroopers evacuate Monte Cassino.
- 1944 – Deportation of Crimean Tatars by the Soviet Union.
- 1948 – The First Legislative Yuan of the Republic of China officially convenes in Nanking.
- 1953 – Jacqueline Cochran becomes the first woman to break the sound barrier.
- 1955 – Operation Passage to Freedom, the evacuation of 310,000 Vietnamese civilians, soldiers and non-Vietnamese members of the French Army from communist North Vietnam to South Vietnam following the end of the First Indochina War, ends.
- 1962 – The French government and representatives of the Provisional Government of the Algerian Republic reach a settlement to end the Algerian war in the Évian Accords.
- 1965 – Israeli spy Eli Cohen is hanged in Damascus, Syria.
- 1969 – Apollo program: Apollo 10 is launched.
- 1972 – During approach to Kharkiv International Airport, Aeroflot Flight 1491 crashes near Ruska Lozova, killing all 112 aboard.
- 1973 – Aeroflot Flight 109 is hijacked mid-flight and the aircraft is subsequently destroyed when the hijacker's bomb explodes, killing all 82 people on board.
- 1974 – Nuclear weapons testing: Under project Smiling Buddha, India successfully detonates its first nuclear weapon becoming the sixth nation to do so.
- 1977 – Likud party wins the 1977 Israeli legislative election, with Menachem Begin, its founder, as the sixth Prime Minister of Israel.
- 1980 – Mount St. Helens erupts in Washington, United States, killing 57 people and causing $3 billion in damage.
- 1980 – Students in Gwangju, South Korea begin demonstrations calling for democratic reforms.
- 1980 – Rioting spreads to Miami's mostly African-American neighborhoods of Overtown and Liberty City following the previous day's courthouse protests.
- 1990 – In France, a modified TGV train achieves a new rail world speed record of 515.3 km/h (320.2 mph).
- 1991 – Northern Somalia declares independence from the rest of Somalia as the Republic of Somaliland.
- 1993 – Riots in Nørrebro, Copenhagen, caused by the approval of the four Danish exceptions in the Maastricht Treaty referendum. Police open fire against civilians for the first time since World War II and injure 11 demonstrators.
- 1994 – Israeli troops finish withdrawing from the Gaza Strip, ceding the area to the Palestinian National Authority to govern.
- 2005 – A second photo from the Hubble Space Telescope confirms that Pluto has two additional moons, Nix and Hydra.
- 2006 – The post Loktantra Andolan government passes a landmark bill curtailing the power of the monarchy and making Nepal a secular country.
- 2009 – The LTTE are defeated by the Sri Lankan government, ending almost 26 years of fighting between the two sides.
- 2015 – At least 78 people die in a landslide caused by heavy rains in the Colombian town of Salgar.
- 2018 – A school shooting at Santa Fe High School in Texas kills ten people.
- 2018 – Cubana de Aviación Flight 972 crashes in Santiago de las Vegas after takeoff from José Martí International Airport in Havana, Cuba, killing 112 of the 113 people on board.
- 2019 – United States presidential election: Joe Biden launches his presidential campaign.
- 2026 – A shooting carried out by two gunmen at the Islamic Center of San Diego results in the deaths of five people, including the perpetrators.

== Births ==
=== Pre-1600 ===
- 1048 – Omar Khayyám, Persian mathematician, astronomer, and poet (died 1131)
- 1186 – Konstantin of Rostov (died 1218)
- 1450 – Piero Soderini, Italian politician and diplomat (died 1513)
- 1537 – Guido Luca Ferrero, Roman Catholic cardinal (died 1585)

=== 1601–1900 ===
- 1631 – Stanislaus Papczyński, Polish priest and saint (died 1701)
- 1662 – George Smalridge, English bishop (died 1719)
- 1692 – (O.S.) Joseph Butler, English bishop, theologian, and apologist (died 1752)
- 1711 – Roger Joseph Boscovich, Ragusan physicist, astronomer, and mathematician (died 1787)
- 1777 – John George Children, English chemist, mineralogist, and zoologist (died 1852)
- 1778 – Charles Vane, 3rd Marquess of Londonderry, Irish soldier and diplomat, British Ambassador to Austria (died 1854)
- 1785 – John Wilson, Scottish author and critic (died 1854)
- 1797 – Frederick Augustus II of Saxony (died 1854)
- 1822 – Mathew Brady, American photographer and journalist (died 1896)
- 1824 – Wilhelm Hofmeister, German botanist (died 1877)
- 1835 – Charles N. Sims, American Methodist preacher and 3rd chancellor of Syracuse University (died 1908)
- 1850 – Oliver Heaviside, English engineer, mathematician, and physicist (died 1925)
- 1851 – James Budd, American lawyer and politician, 19th Governor of California (died 1908)
- 1851 – Simon Kahquados, Potawatomi political activist (died 1930)
- 1852 – Gertrude Käsebier, American photographer (died 1934)
- 1854 – Bernard Zweers, Dutch composer and educator (died 1924)
- 1855 – Francis Bellamy, American minister and author (died 1931)
- 1862 – Josephus Daniels, American publisher and politician, 41st United States Secretary of the Navy (died 1948)
- 1867 – Minakata Kumagusu, Japanese author, biologist, naturalist and ethnologist (died 1941)
- 1868 – Nicholas II of Russia (died 1918)
- 1869 – Lucy Beaumont, English-American actress (died 1937)
- 1871 – Denis Horgan, Irish shot putter and weight thrower (died 1922)
- 1872 – Bertrand Russell, British mathematician, historian, and philosopher, Nobel Prize laureate (died 1970)
- 1876 – Hermann Müller, German journalist and politician, 12th Chancellor of Germany (died 1931)
- 1878 – Johannes Terwogt, Dutch rower (died 1977)
- 1882 – Babe Adams, American baseball player, manager, and journalist (died 1968)
- 1883 – Eurico Gaspar Dutra, Brazilian marshal and politician, 16th President of Brazil (died 1974)
- 1883 – Walter Gropius, German-American architect, designed the John F. Kennedy Federal Building (died 1969)
- 1886 – Jeanie MacPherson, American actress and screenwriter (died 1946)
- 1888 – (O.S.) Hanna Barysevich, the oldest female resident of Belarus not registered by the Guinness Book of Records. (died 2007)
- 1889 – Thomas Midgley Jr., American chemist and engineer (died 1944)
- 1891 – Rudolf Carnap, German-American philosopher and academic (died 1970)
- 1892 – Ezio Pinza, Italian-American actor and singer (died 1957)
- 1895 – Augusto César Sandino, Nicaraguan rebel leader (died 1934)
- 1896 – Eric Backman, Swedish runner (died 1965)
- 1897 – Frank Capra, Italian-American director, producer, and screenwriter (died 1991)
- 1898 – Faruk Nafiz Çamlıbel, Turkish poet, author, and playwright (died 1973)

=== 1901–present ===
- 1901 – Henri Sauguet, French composer (died 1989)
- 1901 – Vincent du Vigneaud, American biochemist and academic, Nobel Prize laureate (died 1978)
- 1902 – Meredith Willson, American playwright and composer (died 1984)
- 1904 – Jacob K. Javits, American colonel and politician, 58th New York Attorney General (died 1986)
- 1904 – Shunryū Suzuki, Japanese-American monk and educator (died 1971)
- 1905 – Ruth Alexander, pioneering American pilot (died 1930)
- 1905 – Hedley Verity, English cricketer and soldier (died 1943)
- 1907 – Irene Hunt, American author and educator (died 2001)
- 1909 – Fred Perry, English tennis player and academic (died 1995)
- 1910 – Ester Boserup, Danish economist and author (died 1999)
- 1911 – Big Joe Turner, American blues/R&B singer (died 1985)
- 1912 – Richard Brooks, American director, producer, and screenwriter (died 1992)
- 1912 – Perry Como, American singer and television host (died 2001)
- 1912 – Walter Sisulu, South African politician (died 2003)
- 1913 – Jane Birdwood, Baroness Birdwood, Canadian-English publisher and politician (died 2000)
- 1914 – Pierre Balmain, French fashion designer, founded Balmain (died 1982)
- 1914 – Boris Christoff, Bulgarian-Italian opera singer (died 1993)
- 1917 – Bill Everett, American author and illustrator (died 1973)
- 1919 – Margot Fonteyn, British ballerina (died 1991)
- 1920 – Pope John Paul II (died 2005)
- 1920 – Anthony Storr, English psychiatrist, psychoanalyst, and author (died 2001)
- 1921 – Joan Eardley, British artist (died 1963)
- 1921 – Michael A. Epstein, English pathologist and academic (died 2024)
- 1922 – Bill Macy, American actor (died 2019)
- 1922 – Kai Winding, Danish-American trombonist and composer (died 1983)
- 1923 – Jean-Louis Roux, Canadian actor and politician, 34th Lieutenant Governor of Quebec (died 2013)
- 1923 – Hugh Shearer, Jamaican journalist and politician, 3rd Prime Minister of Jamaica (died 2004)
- 1924 – Priscilla Pointer, American actress (died 2025)
- 1924 – Jack Whitaker, American sportscaster (died 2019)
- 1925 – Lillian Hoban, American author and illustrator (died 1998)
- 1927 – Richard Body, English politician (died 2018)
- 1927 – Ray Nagel, American football player and coach (died 2015)
- 1928 – Pernell Roberts, American actor (died 2010)
- 1929 – Jack Sanford, American baseball player and coach (died 2000)
- 1929 – Norman St John-Stevas, Baron St John of Fawsley, English lawyer and politician, Chancellor of the Duchy of Lancaster (died 2012)
- 1930 – Warren Rudman, American soldier, lawyer, and politician (died 2012)
- 1930 – Fred Saberhagen, American soldier and author (died 2007)
- 1931 – Don Martin, American cartoonist (died 2000)
- 1931 – Robert Morse, American actor (died 2022)
- 1931 – Kalju Pitksaar, Estonian chess player (died 1995)
- 1931 – Clément Vincent, Canadian farmer and politician (died 2018)
- 1933 – Bernadette Chirac, French politician, First Lady of France (died 2026)
- 1933 – H. D. Deve Gowda, Indian farmer and politician, 11th Prime Minister of India
- 1933 – Don Whillans, English rock climber and mountaineer (died 1985)
- 1934 – Dwayne Hickman, American actor and director (died 2022)
- 1935 – Pádraig Ó Snodaigh, Irish activist and writer (died 2025)
- 1936 – Leon Ashley, American singer-songwriter (died 2013)
- 1936 – Türker İnanoğlu, Turkish director, producer, and screenwriter (died 2024)
- 1936 – Michael Sandle, English sculptor and academic
- 1937 – Brooks Robinson, American baseball player and sportscaster (died 2023)
- 1937 – Jacques Santer, Luxembourger jurist and politician, 22nd Prime Minister of Luxembourg
- 1938 – Janet Fish, American painter and academic
- 1939 – Patrick Cormack, Baron Cormack, English historian, journalist, and politician (died 2024)
- 1939 – Giovanni Falcone, Italian lawyer and judge (died 1992)
- 1939 – Gordon O'Connor, Canadian general and politician, 38th Canadian Minister of Defence
- 1940 – Erico Aumentado, Filipino journalist, lawyer, and politician (died 2012)
- 1941 – Gino Brito, Canadian wrestler and promoter
- 1941 – Malcolm Longair, Scottish astronomer, physicist, and academic
- 1941 – Miriam Margolyes, English-Australian actress and singer
- 1942 – Nobby Stiles, English footballer, coach, and manager (died 2020)
- 1943 – Jimmy Snuka, Fijian wrestler (died 2017)
- 1944 – Albert Hammond, English singer-songwriter, guitarist, and producer
- 1944 – W. G. Sebald, German novelist, essayist, and poet (died 2001)
- 1945 – Gail Strickland, American actress
- 1946 – Frank Hsieh, Taiwanese lawyer and politician, 40th Premier of the Republic of China
- 1946 – Reggie Jackson, American baseball player and sportscaster
- 1946 – Gerd Langguth, German political scientist and author (died 2013)
- 1947 – John Bruton, Irish politician, 10th Taoiseach of Ireland (died 2024)
- 1948 – Joe Bonsall, American country/gospel singer (died 2024)
- 1948 – Yi Mun-yol, South Korean author and academic
- 1948 – Richard Swedberg, Swedish sociologist and academic
- 1948 – Tom Udall, American lawyer and politician, 28th New Mexico Attorney General, United States Senator from New Mexico
- 1949 – Walter Hawkins, American gospel music singer and pastor (died 2010)
- 1949 – Rick Wakeman, English progressive rock keyboardist and songwriter
- 1950 – Rod Milburn, American hurdler and coach (died 1997)
- 1950 – Mark Mothersbaugh, American singer-songwriter and painter
- 1951 – Richard Clapton, Australian singer-songwriter and guitarist
- 1951 – Jim Sundberg, American baseball player and sportscaster
- 1951 – Angela Voigt, German long jumper (died 2013)
- 1952 – Diane Duane, American author and screenwriter
- 1952 – David Leakey, English general and politician
- 1952 – George Strait, American singer, guitarist and producer
- 1952 – Jeana Yeager, American pilot
- 1953 – Alan Kupperberg, American author and illustrator (died 2015)
- 1954 – Wreckless Eric, English singer-songwriter and guitarist
- 1954 – Eric Gerets, Belgian footballer and manager
- 1955 – Chow Yun-fat, Hong Kong actor and screenwriter
- 1956 – Catherine Corsini, French director and screenwriter
- 1956 – John Godber, English playwright and screenwriter
- 1956 – Jim Moginie, Australian guitarist and songwriter
- 1957 – Michael Cretu, Romanian-German keyboard player and producer
- 1957 – Henrietta Moore, English anthropologist and academic
- 1958 – Rubén Omar Romano, Argentinian-Mexican footballer and coach
- 1958 – Toyah Willcox, English singer-songwriter, producer, and actress
- 1959 – Graham Dilley, English cricketer and coach (died 2011)
- 1959 – Jay Wells, Canadian ice hockey player and coach
- 1960 – Brent Ashton, Canadian ice hockey player and coach
- 1960 – Jari Kurri, Finnish ice hockey player, coach, and manager
- 1960 – Yannick Noah, French tennis player
- 1961 – Russell Senior, English singer-songwriter and guitarist
- 1963 – Marty McSorley, Canadian ice hockey player and coach
- 1963 – Sam Vincent, American basketball player and coach
- 1964 – Ignasi Guardans, Spanish academic and politician
- 1966 – Renata Nielsen, Polish-Danish long jumper and coach
- 1966 – Michael Tait, American singer-songwriter and producer
- 1967 – Nina Björk, Swedish journalist and author
- 1967 – Heinz-Harald Frentzen, German race car driver
- 1967 – Nancy Juvonen, American screenwriter and producer, co-founded Flower Films
- 1967 – Mimi Macpherson, Australian environmentalist, entrepreneur and celebrity
- 1968 – Philippe Benetton, French rugby player
- 1968 – Ralf Kelleners, German race car driver
- 1969 – Troy Cassar-Daley, Australian singer-songwriter and guitarist
- 1969 – Martika, American singer-songwriter, producer, and actress
- 1969 – Antônio Carlos Zago, Brazilian footballer and manager
- 1970 – Javier Cárdenas, Spanish singer, television and radio presenter
- 1970 – Tina Fey, American actress, producer, and screenwriter
- 1970 – Tim Horan, Australian rugby player and sportscaster
- 1970 – Billy Howerdel, American guitarist, songwriter, and producer
- 1970 – Vicky Sunohara, Canadian former ice hockey player
- 1971 – Brad Friedel, American international soccer player, manager and sportscaster
- 1971 – Mark Menzies, Scottish politician
- 1971 – Nobuteru Taniguchi, Japanese race car driver
- 1972 – Turner Stevenson, Canadian ice hockey player and coach
- 1973 – Donyell Marshall, American basketball player and coach
- 1973 – Aleksandr Olerski, Estonian footballer (died 2011)
- 1974 – Nelson Figueroa, American baseball player and sportscaster
- 1975 – Jem, Welsh singer-songwriter and producer
- 1975 – John Higgins, Scottish snooker player
- 1975 – Jack Johnson, American singer-songwriter and guitarist
- 1975 – Ingvild Kjerkol, Norwegian politician
- 1976 – Ron Mercer, American basketball player
- 1976 – Marko Tomasović, Croatian pianist and composer
- 1976 – Oleg Tverdovsky, Ukrainian-Russian ice hockey player
- 1977 – Lee Hendrie, English footballer
- 1977 – Danny Mills, English footballer and sportscaster
- 1977 – Li Tie, Chinese footballer and manager
- 1978 – Ricardo Carvalho, Portuguese footballer
- 1978 – Marcus Giles, American baseball player
- 1978 – Charles Kamathi, Kenyan runner
- 1979 – Jens Bergensten, Swedish video game designer, co-designed Minecraft
- 1979 – Mariusz Lewandowski, Polish footballer
- 1979 – Michal Martikán, Slovak slalom canoeist
- 1979 – Milivoje Novaković, Slovenian footballer
- 1979 – Julián Speroni, Argentinian footballer
- 1980 – Reggie Evans, American basketball player
- 1980 – Michaël Llodra, French tennis player
- 1980 – Diego Pérez, Uruguayan footballer
- 1981 – Mahamadou Diarra, Malian international footballer
- 1981 – Ashley Harrison, Australian rugby league player
- 1982 – Jason Brown, English footballer
- 1982 – Marie-Ève Pelletier, Canadian tennis player
- 1983 – Gary O'Neil, English footballer
- 1983 – Luis Terrero, Dominican baseball player
- 1983 – Vince Young, American football player
- 1984 – Ivet Lalova, Bulgarian sprinter
- 1984 – Simon Pagenaud, French race car driver
- 1984 – Darius Šilinskis, Lithuanian basketball player
- 1984 – Joakim Soria, Mexican baseball player
- 1984 – Niki Terpstra, Dutch cyclist
- 1985 – Oliver Sin, Hungarian painter
- 1985 – Henrique Sereno, Portuguese footballer
- 1986 – Kevin Anderson, South African tennis player
- 1988 – Taeyang, South Korean singer
- 1990 – Dimitri Daeseleire, Belgian footballer
- 1990 – Yuya Osako, Japanese footballer
- 1990 – Josh Starling, Australian rugby league player
- 1992 – Adwoa Aboah, British fashion model
- 1993 – Stuart Percy, Canadian ice hockey player
- 1993 – Jessica Watson, Australian sailor
- 1998 – Polina Edmunds, American figure skater
- 1999 – Laura Omloop, Belgian singer-songwriter
- 2000 – Ryan Sessegnon, English footballer
- 2000 – Steven Sessegnon, English footballer
- 2001 – Emma Navarro, American tennis player
- 2001 – Grace Reiter, American actress, comedian, and content creator
- 2002 – Alina Zagitova, Russian figure skater
- 2003 – Travis Hunter, American football player
- 2009 – Hala Finley, American actress

== Deaths ==
=== Pre-1600 ===
- 526 – Pope John I
- 893 – Stephen I of Constantinople (born 867)
- 932 – Ma Shaohong, general of Later Tang
- 947 – Emperor Taizong of the Liao dynasty
- 978 – Frederick I, duke of Upper Lorraine
- 1065 – Frederick, Duke of Lower Lorraine (born c. 1003)
- 1096 – Minna of Worms, Jewish martyr killed during the Worms massacre (1096)
- 1160 – Eric Jedvardsson (King Eric IX) of Sweden (since 1156); (born circa 1120)
- 1297 – Nicholas Longespee, Bishop of Salisbury
- 1401 – Vladislaus II of Opole (born 1332)
- 1410 – Rupert of Germany, Count Palatine of the Rhine (born 1352)
- 1550 – Jean, Cardinal of Lorraine (born 1498)
- 1551 – Domenico di Pace Beccafumi, Italian painter (born 1486)

=== 1601–1900 ===
- 1675 – Stanisław Lubieniecki, Polish astronomer, historian, and theologian (born 1623)
- 1675 – Jacques Marquette, French-American missionary and explorer (born 1637)
- 1692 – Elias Ashmole, English astrologer and politician (born 1617)
- 1721 – Maria Barbara Carillo, victim of the Spanish Inquisition (born 1625)
- 1733 – Georg Böhm, German organist and composer (born 1661)
- 1780 – Charles Hardy, English-American admiral and politician, 29th Colonial Governor of New York (born 1714)
- 1781 – Túpac Amaru II, Peruvian indigenous rebel leader (born 1742)
- 1792 – Levy Solomons, Canadian merchant and fur trader (born 1730)
- 1795 – Robert Rogers, English colonel (born 1731)
- 1799 – Pierre Beaumarchais, French playwright and publisher (born 1732)
- 1800 – Alexander Suvorov, Russian general (born 1729)
- 1807 – John Douglas, Scottish bishop and scholar (born 1721)
- 1808 – Elijah Craig, American minister, inventor, and educator, invented Bourbon whiskey (born 1738)
- 1844 – Richard McCarty, American lawyer and politician (born 1780)
- 1853 – Lionel Kieseritzky, Estonian-French chess player (born 1806)
- 1867 – Clarkson Stanfield, English painter (born 1793)
- 1889 – Isabella Glyn, Scottish-English actress (born 1823)
- 1900 – Félix Ravaisson-Mollien, French archaeologist and philosopher (born 1813)

=== 1901–present ===
- 1908 – Louis-Napoléon Casault, Canadian lawyer, judge, and politician (born 1823)
- 1909 – Isaac Albéniz, Spanish pianist and composer (born 1860)
- 1909 – George Meredith, English novelist and poet (born 1828)
- 1910 – Eliza Orzeszkowa, Polish author and publisher (born 1841)
- 1910 – Pauline Viardot, French soprano and composer (born 1821)
- 1911 – Gustav Mahler, Austrian composer and conductor (born 1860)
- 1916 – Chen Qimei, Chinese revolutionary (born 1878)
- 1922 – Charles Louis Alphonse Laveran, French physician and parasitologist, Nobel Prize laureate (born 1845)
- 1941 – Werner Sombart, German economist and sociologist (born 1863)
- 1943 – Ōnishiki Daigorō, Japanese sumo wrestler, the 28th Yokozuna (born 1883)
- 1947 – Hal Chase, American baseball player and manager (born 1883)
- 1955 – Mary McLeod Bethune, American educator and activist (born 1875)
- 1956 – Maurice Tate, English cricketer (born 1895)
- 1958 – Jacob Fichman, Israeli poet and critic (born 1881)
- 1963 – Ernie Davis, American football player, coach, and manager (born 1939)
- 1968 – Frank Walsh, Australian politician, 34th Premier of South Australia (born 1897)
- 1971 – Aleksandr Gennadievich Kurosh, Russian mathematician and theorist (born 1908)
- 1973 – Jeannette Rankin, American social worker and politician (born 1880)
- 1973 – İbrahim Kaypakkaya, Turkish Maoist revolutionary and founder of Communist Party of Turkey/Marxist-Leninist (TKP/ML) (born 1949)
- 1974 – Harry Ricardo, English engine designer and researcher (born 1885)
- 1975 – Leroy Anderson, American composer and conductor (born 1908)
- 1980 – Victims of Mount St. Helens eruption:
  - Reid Blackburn, American photographer and journalist (born 1952)
  - David A. Johnston, American volcanologist and geologist (born 1949)
- 1980 – Ian Curtis, English singer-songwriter (born 1956)
- 1981 – Arthur O'Connell, American actor (born 1908)
- 1981 – William Saroyan, American novelist, playwright, and short story writer (born 1908)
- 1987 – Mahdi Amel, Lebanese journalist, poet, and academic (born 1936)
- 1989 – Dorothy Ruth, American horse breeder and author (born 1921)
- 1990 – Jill Ireland, English actress (born 1936)
- 1995 – Elisha Cook, Jr., American actor (born 1903)
- 1995 – Alexander Godunov, Russian-American ballet dancer and actor (born 1949)
- 1995 – Brinsley Trench, 8th Earl of Clancarty, Irish ufologist and historian (born 1911)
- 1995 – Elizabeth Montgomery, American actress (born 1933)
- 1998 – Obaidullah Aleem, Indian-Pakistani poet and author (born 1939)
- 1999 – Augustus Pablo, Jamaican singer, keyboard player, and producer (born 1954)
- 1999 – Betty Robinson, American runner (born 1911)
- 2000 – Stephen M. Wolownik, Russian-American composer and musicologist (born 1946)
- 2001 – Irene Hunt, American author and illustrator (born 1907)
- 2002 – Davey Boy Smith, English professional wrestler (born 1962)
- 2004 – Elvin Jones, American drummer and bandleader (born 1927)
- 2006 – Jaan Eilart, Estonian geographer, ecologist, and historian (born 1933)
- 2007 – Pierre-Gilles de Gennes, French physicist and academic, Nobel Prize laureate (born 1932)
- 2008 – Joseph Pevney, American actor and director (born 1911)
- 2008 – Roberto García-Calvo Montiel, Spanish judge (born 1942)
- 2009 – Dolla, American rapper (born 1987)
- 2009 – Wayne Allwine, American voice actor, sound effects editor and Foley artist (born 1947)
- 2009 – Velupillai Prabhakaran, Sri Lankan rebel leader, founded the Liberation Tigers of Tamil Eelam (born 1954)
- 2012 – Dietrich Fischer-Dieskau, German opera singer and conductor (born 1925)
- 2012 – Peter Jones, English-Australian drummer and songwriter (born 1967)
- 2012 – Alan Oakley, English bicycle designer, designed the Raleigh Chopper (born 1927)
- 2013 – Aleksei Balabanov, Russian director and screenwriter (born 1959)
- 2013 – Jo Benkow, Norwegian soldier and politician (born 1924)
- 2013 – Steve Forrest, American actor (born 1925)
- 2013 – David McMillan, American football player (born 1981)
- 2013 – Lothar Schmid, German chess player (born 1928)
- 2014 – Dobrica Ćosić, Serbian politician, 1st President of the Federal Republic of Yugoslavia (born 1921)
- 2014 – Hans-Peter Dürr, German physicist and academic (born 1929)
- 2014 – Kaiketsu Masateru, Japanese sumo wrestler (born 1948)
- 2014 – Chukwuedu Nwokolo, Nigerian physician and academic (born 1921)
- 2014 – Wubbo Ockels, Dutch physicist and astronaut (born 1946)
- 2015 – Halldór Ásgrímsson, Icelandic accountant and politician, 22nd Prime Minister of Iceland (born 1947)
- 2015 – Raymond Gosling, English physicist and academic (born 1926)
- 2015 – Jean-François Théodore, French businessman (born 1946)
- 2017 – Roger Ailes, American businessman (born 1940)
- 2017 – Chris Cornell, American singer (born 1964)
- 2017 – Jacque Fresco, American engineer and academic (born 1916)
- 2019 – Austin Eubanks, American addiction recovery advocate, survivor of the Columbine shooting (born 1981)
- 2020 – Ken Osmond, American actor and police officer (born 1943)
- 2021 – Charles Grodin, American actor and talk show host (born 1935)
- 2021 – Yolanda Tortolero, Venezuelan politician
- 2023 – Jim Brown, American football player, civil rights activist, and actor (born 1936)
- 2024 – Bruce Nordstrom, American businessman (born 1933)
- 2024 – Tony O'Reilly, Irish rugby player and businessman (born 1936)
- 2024 – Alice Stewart, American political commentator (born 1966)
- 2026 – Tom Kane, American voice actor (born 1962)

== Holidays and observances ==
- Christian feast day:
  - Ælfgifu of Shaftesbury
  - Blessed Blandine Merten
  - Eric IX of Sweden
  - Felix of Cantalice
  - Pope John I
  - Venantius of Camerino
  - May 18 (Eastern Orthodox liturgics)
- Baltic Fleet Day (Russia)
- Day of Remembrance of Crimean Tatar genocide (Ukraine)
- Independence Day (Somaliland) (unrecognized)
- International Museum Day
- National Speech Pathologist Day (United States)
- Revival, Unity, and Poetry of Magtymguly Day (Turkmenistan)
- Teacher's Day (Syria)
