= Desecration =

Depriving of something of its sacred character

Desecration is the act of depriving something of its sacred character, or the disrespectful, contemptuous, or destructive treatment of that which is held to be sacred or holy by a group or individual.

== Overview ==
Many consider acts of desecration to be sacrilegious acts. This can include desecration of sacred books, sacred places or sacred objects. Desecration generally may be considered from the perspective of a particular religion or spiritual activity. Desecration may be applied to natural systems or components, particularly if those systems are part of naturalistic spiritual religion.

To respectfully remove the sacred character of a place or an object is deconsecration, and is distinct from desecration.

Some religious groups, such as the Catholic Church have specific rules as to what constitutes desecration and what should be done in these circumstances.

== Examples ==
=== Bosnia and Herzegovina ===
The ethnic cleansing campaign that took place throughout areas controlled by the Army of the Republika Srpska (VRS) targeted Bosnian Muslims, and included the destruction of Muslim places of worship.

=== Christianization of the Roman Empire ===
Examples of the destruction of pagan temples in the late fourth century, as recorded in surviving texts, describe Martin of Tours's attacks on holy sites in Gaul, the destruction of temples in Syria by Marcellus, the destruction of temples and images in, and surrounding, Carthage, the Patriarch Theophilus who seized and destroyed pagan temples in Alexandria, the levelling of all the temples in Gaza and the wider destruction of holy sites that spread rapidly throughout Egypt. This is supplemented in abundance by archaeological evidence in the northern provinces exposing broken and burnt out buildings and hastily buried objects of piety. The leader of the Egyptian monks who participated in the sack of temples replied to the victims who demanded back their sacred icons:

I peacefully removed your gods...there is no such thing as robbery for those who truly possess Christ.

At the turn of the century St Augustine gave a sermon to his congregation in Carthage on removing all tangible symbols of paganism:

Am I saying "Stop wanting what you want"? On the contrary, we must be thankful that you want what God wants. That every superstition of the pagans and the Gentiles should be abolished is what God wants, God has ordered, God has foretold, God has begun to bring about, and in many parts of the world has already in great measure achieved.

In the year 407 a decree was issued to the west from Rome:

If any images stand even now in the temples and shrines...., they shall be torn from their foundations...The temples situated in cities or towns shall be taken for public use. Altars shall be destroyed in all places.

Sacred sites were now appropriated by Christianity: "Let altars be built and relics be placed there" wrote Pope Gregory I, "so that [the pagans] have to change from the worship of the daemones to that of the true God."

=== In Judaism ===
In Judaism, the "Desecration of God's Name" meaning the desecration of any aspect of Judaism and its beliefs and practices as commanded in the Torah and Jewish Law and hence of God, is known as Chillul Hashem from the Hebrew meaning "[the] Desecration [of] the Name [of] God". In some instances to avoid Chillul Hashem Judaism would require that its adherents die as martyrs.

The opposite or converse of Chillul Hashem in Judaism is Kiddush Hashem meaning "Sanctification [of] the Name of God".

=== In Sikhism ===
Desecration is taken harshly by Sikhs. It is called beadbi by them. In October 2021, a Nihang Singh killed a man for beadbi of the Sarbloh Granth. In December, a man was beaten to death at the Golden Temple for committing desecration. Such punishments are justified with orthodox Sikhs, saying "instant justice" is deserving for beadbi which is the "ultimate act of crime".

=== Kosovo ===
Numerous Albanian cultural sites in Kosovo were destroyed during the Kosovo conflict (1998-1999) which constituted a war crime violating the Hague and Geneva Conventions. In all 225 out of 600 mosques in Kosovo were damaged, vandalised, or destroyed alongside other Islamic architecture during the conflict. Archives belonging to the Islamic Community of Kosovo with records spanning 500 years were also destroyed. During the war, Islamic architectural heritage posed for Yugoslav Serb paramilitary and military forces as Albanian patrimony with destruction of non-Serbian architectural heritage being a methodical and planned component of ethnic cleansing in Kosovo.

Revenge attacks against Serbian religious sites commenced following the conflict and the return of hundreds of thousands of Kosovo Albanian refugees to their homes. During violent unrest in 2004, more than 35 Serbian Orthodox church buildings were desecrated, damaged or destroyed.

=== Red Terror in Spain ===
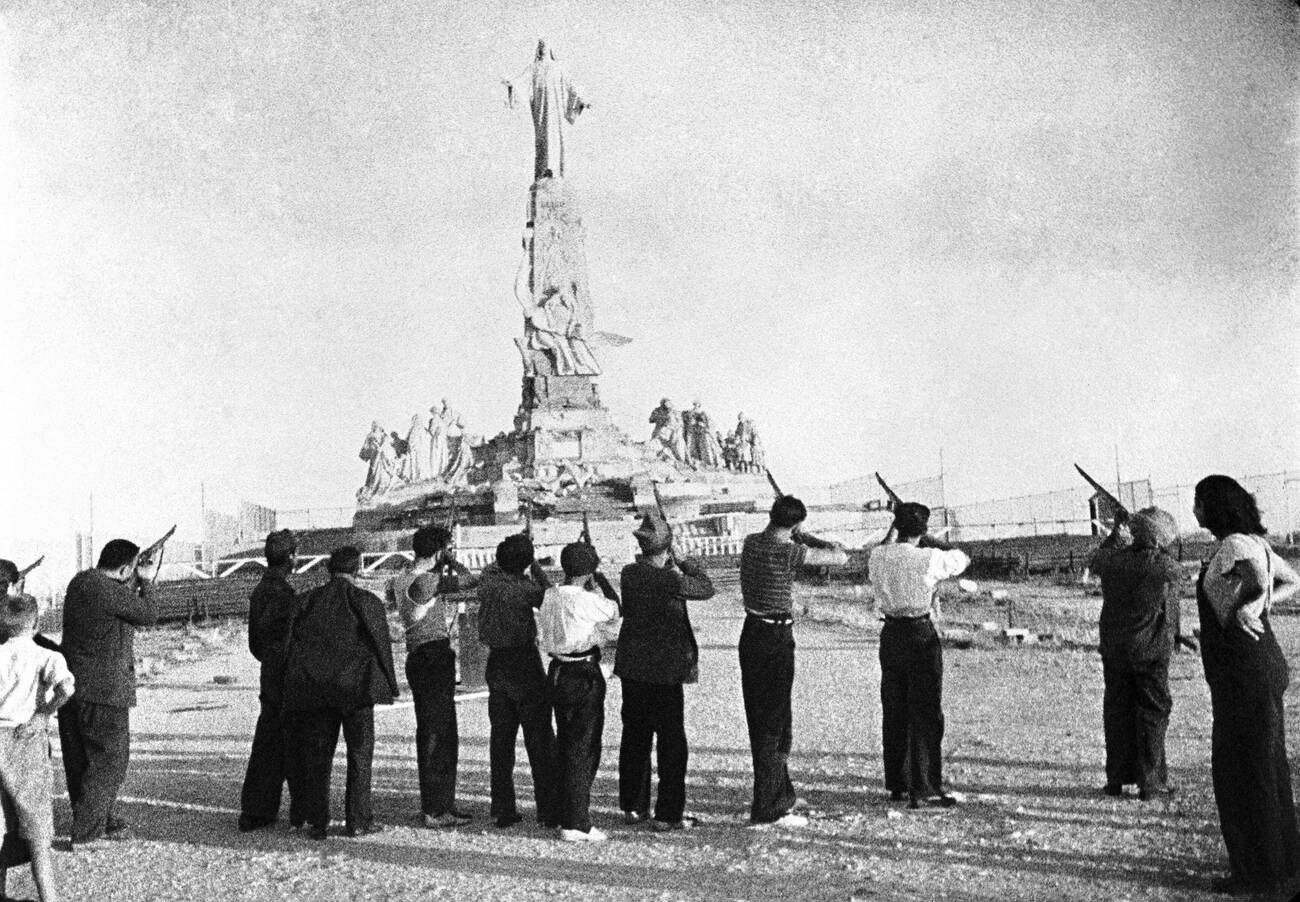
"Execution" of the Sacred Heart by leftist militiamen at Cerro de los Ángeles near Madrid, on 7 August 1936, was the most famous of the widespread desecration of images and Churches. King Alfonso XIII had consecrated the nation to the Sacred Heart of Jesus at the spot on 30 May 1919. The photograph was taken by a Paramount newsreel representative and originally published in the London Daily Mail with a caption calling it part of the "Spanish Reds' war on religion."

The Red Terror in Spain during the Spanish Civil War involved massive desecration of churches, synagogues and other sacred objects and places by leftists. On the night of 19 July 1936 alone, 50 churches were burned. In Barcelona, out of the 58 churches, only the Cathedral was spared, and similar events occurred almost everywhere in Republican Spain. All the Catholic churches in the Republican zone were closed, but the attacks were not limited to Catholic churches, as synagogues were also pillaged and closed, but some small Protestant churches were spared.

== See also ==
- Blasphemy
- Desecration of graves
- Flag desecration
- Host desecration
- Qur'an desecration
- Vandalism
