= Abraham ben Samuel Cohen of Lask =

18th-century Jewish activist

Abraham ben Yechiel-Michel Catz Ha Cohen of Lask (Note: Yechiel-Michel was the grandson of the martyr Yechiel Michel ben Eliezer of Nemirov.) was a Jewish ascetic who flourished at the end of the 18th century. He went to live at Jerusalem in 1785, but afterward traveled through Europe as an agent for the collection of donations for the Polish Jews in the Eretz Yisrael, making Amsterdam his center; he died as Hakam at Safed, during a riot against the Jews, who had protested against excessive taxation. Another version says he was punished by the Turks, in Jerusalem, (see below) and died in Safed, in 1799; there he was buried. He did not have children. Abraham (brother of Samuel Catz of Lask) was an ascetic of a remarkable type; he fasted six days of the week, from Sabbath night to Sabbath eve, but feasted quite luxuriously on the Sabbath. Often he devoted entire days and nights to the study of the Torah, standing upright during that time. He took his daily ablutions in the river before offering his prayers in the morning, often breaking through the ice in winter for this purpose. Yet in spite of all this austerity he was a man of uncommon vigor.

Once in the Holy Land, together with a number of Jewish scholars, Abraham was dragged to prison by some Turkish officials, and subjected to the bastinado, for no other reason than that it was the usual method pursued by the Turkish government for extorting money from the Jews. Abraham and another rabbi alone survived. At every stroke received Abraham uttered the rabbinic phrase, גם זו לטובה ("This, too, is for the best"). He was held in reverence by the best men of the time as "the holy man of God."

He published several kabalistic homilies, one under the title of Weshab ha-Kohen (The Priest Shall Return), Leghorn, 1788; another, Wechishab lo ha-Kohen (The Priest Shall Reckon), Fürth, 1784; a third, Bet Ya'akob (Jacob's House), Leghorn, 1792; and a fourth, Ayin Panim ba-Torah (Seventy Meanings of the Law), Warsaw, 1797. The last work gives seventy reasons for the order of the sections in the Pentateuch, as well as seventy reasons why the Law begins, "In the beginning God created the heavens and the earth" (Gen. i.1). All are filled with fantastic numerical and alphabetical combinations.
