= Worms massacre (1096) =

Mass murder of Jews in Worms, Holy Roman Empire (now Germany)

Coordinates: 49.627°N 8.342°E

The Worms massacre or Worms pogrom was the mass murder of at least 800 to 1,000 Jews from Worms, Holy Roman Empire (now Germany), during the events of the First Crusade (More precisely by the People's Crusade) under Count Emicho in May, 18-25 1096. (Note: Although Emicho has frequently been referenced in secondary and tertiary sources as having been present during the massacres of Jews in Cologne and Worms, there is sparse evidence in the primary accounts to support his involvement. Indeed, the only massacre in which Emicho definitively participated was that in Mainz.) This massacre is a part of series of mass murders of Jews that happen in the Rhineland Jewish communities that known as The Rhineland massacres or Gzerot Tatnó (Hebrew: גזרות תתנ"ו, "Edicts of 4856").

The massacre at Worms was one of a number of attacks against Jewish communities perpetrated during the First Crusade (1096–1099). Followers of Count Emicho arrived at Worms on 18 May 1096. Soon after his arrival, a rumor spread that the Jews had boiled a Christian alive, and used his corpse to contaminate water to poison the town's wells. The local populace later joined forces with Emicho and launched a savage attack on the town's Jews, who had been given sanctuary in Prince-Bishopric of Worms' palace, though others chose to remain outside its walls. They were the first to be massacred.

After eight days, Emicho's army, assisted by local burghers broke in and slaughtered those seeking asylum there. The Jews were in the midst of reciting the Hallel prayer for Rosh Chodesh Sivan.

In all, from 800 to 1,000 Jews were killed, with the exception of some who committed suicide (Martyrdom, known in Judaism as Kiddush Hashem) and a few who were forcibly baptised. One, Simchah ben Yitzchak ha-Cohen, stabbed the bishop's nephew while being baptised and was consequently killed. One of the most famous victims was Minna of Worms. The synagogue was destroyed during the massacre and subsequently rebuilt in 1175. In the late eleventh or early twelfth century a prayer was written in memory of those killed in the massacre called Av HaRachamim.

== See also ==
- Av HaRachamim
- Medieval antisemitism
- Rhineland massacres
- Minna of Worms
- Kalonymus ben Meshullam
- History of European Jews in the Middle Ages
