= Av HaRachamim =

Jewish memorial prayer

Av Harachamim or Abh Haraḥamim (אב הרחמים "Father of mercy" or "Merciful Father") is a Jewish memorial prayer which was written in the late eleventh or early twelfth century, after the destruction of the Ashkenazi communities around the Rhine River by Christian crusaders during the First Crusade. First appearing in prayer books in 1290, it is printed in every Orthodox siddur in Nusach Sefarad and Nusach Ashkenaz, and it is recited in the Eastern Ashkenazic rite as part of the weekly Shabbat services except on special shabbatot, and in the Western Ashkenazic rite on the Shabbat before Shavuot and Tisha B'Av.

The Yizkor service on Jewish holidays concludes with the Av Harachamim, which prays for the souls of all Jewish martyrs.

== Text ==
Hebrew Original	English translation	Transliteration
אָב הָרַחֲמִים שׁוֹכֵן מְרוֹמִים	The Merciful father, who dwells upon high,	Av haraħamim shochein m'romim
בְּרַחֲמָיו הָעֲצוּמִים הוּא יִפְקוד בְּרַחֲמִים	in His great mercy will consider with compassion	b'raħamav ha-atzumim hu yifkod b'raħamim.
הַחֲסִידִים וְהַיְשָׁרִים וְהַתְּמִימִים. קְהִלּוֹת הַקּדֶשׁ שֶׁמָּסְרוּ נַפְשָׁם עַל קְדֻשַּׁת הַשֵּׁם	the pious, the upright, the pure, the holy congregations which laid down their lives in sanctification of God.	haħasidim v'ha-ysharim v'ha-t'mimim, k'hilot haqodesh shemas'ru nafsham al qdushat haSheim
הַנֶּאֱהָבִים וְהַנְּעִימִים בְּחַיֵּיהֶם וּבְמותָם לא נִפְרָדוּ. מִנְּשָׁרִים קַלּוּ וּמֵאֲרָיות גָּבֵרוּ לַעֲשׂות רְצון קוֹנָם וְחֵפֶץ צוּרָם.	"Who were beloved and cherished in their lives, and even in death were not parted. Who were swifter than eagles and fiercer than lions" in their service to the Creator.	hane'ehavim v'han'imim b'ħayeihem, uvmotam lo nifradu. Min'sharim qalu umeiarayot gaveiru laasot r'tzon qonam v'ħeifetz tzuram.
יִזְכְּרֵם אֱלהֵינוּ לְטובָה עִם שְׁאָר צַדִּיקֵי עולָם. וְיִקום לְעֵינֵינוּ נִקְמַת דַּם עֲבָדָיו הַשָּׁפוּךְ	He will mark them down for good, together with the heroes of old. We will see Him avenge them, avenge the spilled blood of His servants.	Yizk'reim Eloheinu l'tova im sh'ar tzadiqei olam v'yinqom l'eineinu nikmat dam avadav hashafuch
כַּכָּתוּב בְּתוֹרַת משֶׁה אִישׁ הָאֱלהִים. הַרְנִינוּ גויִם עַמּו כִּי דַם עֲבָדָיו יִקּום וְנָקָם יָשִׁיב לְצָרָיו וְכִפֶּר אַדְמָתו עַמּו:	As it says in the Law of Moses, "Sing of His people, O nations, for He will avenge the blood of his servants, return vengeance upon his enemies, will soothe His land and His people".	kakatuv b'torat-Moshe ish haElohim: harninu goiem amo ki dam avadav yikom v'nakam yashiv l'tzarav v'chiper admato amo.
וְעַל יְדֵי עֲבָדֶיךָ הַנְּבִיאִים כָּתוּב לֵאמר. וְנִקֵּיתִי דָּמָם לא נִקֵּיתִי וַיהוָה שׁכֵן בְּצִיּון:	And it further says in the Prophets, "Even when I forgive, I will not forgive their bloodshed, when the LORD dwells in Zion".	V'al y'dei avadecha haN'vi'im katuv leimor: V'nikeiti damam lo nikeiti vAdonai shochein b'Tziyon.
וּבְכִתְבֵי הַקּדֶשׁ נֶאֱמַר לָמָּה יאמְרוּ הַגּויִם אַיֵּה אֱלהֵיהֶם. יִוָּדַע בַּגּויִם לְעֵינֵינוּ נִקְמַת דַּם עֲבָדֶיךָ הַשָּׁפוּךְ:	And in the Writings it says, "Why do the nations ask, 'Where is their God?' We should see the nations taught how You revenge the spilled blood of Your servants".	Uvchitvei haqodesh ne'emar: lama yom'ru hagoyim ayei ehloheihem yivada bagoyim l'eineinu niqmat dam avadecha hashafuch.
וְאומֵר, כִּי דורֵשׁ דָּמִים אותָם זָכָר לא שָׁכַח צַעֲקַת עֲנָוִים:	And it says, "For the Seeker of Blood will remember them, He will not ignore the cries of the innocent".	V'omeir: ki doreish damim otam zachar lo shachaħ tza'akat anavim.
וְאומֵר, יָדִין בַּגּויִם מָלֵא גְוִיּות מָחַץ ראשׁ עַל אֶרֶץ רַבָּה. מִנַּחַל בַּדֶּרֶךְ יִשְׁתֶּה עַל כֵּן יָרִים ראשׁ:	And it says, "He will judge among the nations, full of corpses, His head bowed across the great land. From a stream by the way He will drink -- only then will He raise His head!"	V'omeir: yadin bagoyim malei g'viyot maħatz rosh al eretz raba. Minaħal baderech yishte al kein yarim rosh.

== See also ==
- Martyrdom in Judaism
- Bereavement in Judaism
- Kaddish
