= Yechiel Michel ben Eliezer =

Yechiel Michel ben Eliezer ha-Kohen (Hebrew: יְחִיאֵל מִיכל בֵּן אֱלִיעֶזֶר הָכֹּהֵן; died 10 or 12 June 1648), also known as the Martyr of Nemirov, was a kabbalist and rabbi at Nemirov, Russia who was murdered during the Cossacks' Uprising of 1648.

== Biography ==
Yechiel Michel was the son of the gaon Rabbi Eliezer of Zlatschov. Said to know the entire Torah by heart, Yechiel was known for his mastery of talmudic, kabbalistic, and secular knowledge.

Yechiel at first regarded the Khmelnytsky persecutions as a presage of the coming messianic era. In a sermon on the Shabbat before the Cossack riots, he admonished members of the Jewish community to be martyred rather than forcibly converted to Christianity. When the hordes of Khmelnytsky, taking Nemirov, began the work of pillage and massacre, a Cossack concealed Yechiel, hoping that the latter would disclose where the Jews had hidden their wealth. Yechiel was found by a Ukrainian shoemaker and clubbed to death in the Jewish cemetery on 10 or 12 June 1648. He was mourned by Rabbis Shabbatai HaKohen and Yom-Tov Lipmann Heller in their elegies for the victims of the Khmelnytsky massacres of 1648–1649.

Yechiel was the author of a work entitled Shivrei luḥot ('Fragments of the Tablets'), containing kabbalistic commentary on several Sabbatic sections and the weekly Torah readings given in the Talmud. The work was published posthumously at Lublin in 1680 by Yechiel's nephew, whose introduction includes Jewish accounts of the Cossacks' Uprising. A new edition of the work was published by Rabbi Abraham Baruch Alter Rosenberg in 1913.

== See also ==
- Martyrdom in Judaism
