= Maria Barbara Carillo =

Spanish stake burning victim

Maria Barbara Carillo (Jaén, Spain, 1625 – Madrid, 18 May 1721) was burned at the stake for heresy during the Spanish Inquisition. She was executed at the age of 95 or 96 and is the oldest person known to have been executed at the instigation of the Spanish Inquisition.

Carillo was sentenced to death for heresy for returning to her faith in Judaism. She belonged to a large group of people that were Jews baptized by compulsion, who were accused of secretly practicing the Jewish religion.

== See also ==
- List of people burned as heretics
- Crypto-Judaism
