= Minna of Worms =

Jewish martyr and businesswoman

Minna of Worms (died in May 1096) was a Jewish businesswoman and martyr, killed by antisemitic Christians. She was an influential Jewish person, being a significant moneylender with clients and friends among the Christian nobility. Minna was one of the most famous victims of the 1096 Worms massacre which occurred during the First Crusade. She was murdered after refusing to convert to Christianity.
