= Chillul hashem =

Desecrating the name of God

In Judaism, chillul hashem (Hebrew: חילול השם), also rendered as hilul hashem, is an act that violates the prohibition in the Torah of desecrating (chillul) the name (hashem) of God. Chillul hashem occurs when a Jew acts immorally in the presence of others, either Jews or Gentiles. Since Judaism believes that Jews are representatives of God and his moral code, when a Jew acts shamefully, they have represented God poorly, thus desecrating his name. Chillul Hashem is the opposite of Kiddush Hashem ("sanctification of God's name"), the act of bringing honor, respect, and glory to God's name. The concept of chillul hashem is prevalent in the Hebrew Bible and is often referenced by modern Jews as a reason to uphold the highest moral standard.

== Biblical source ==
There are four references to chillul hashem in the Torah: Leviticus 18:21, 19:12, 22:2, 22:32. The general prohibition of desecrating God's name is stated most explicitly in Leviticus: "You shall not profane My holy name, that I may be sanctified in the midst of the Israelite people." (Leviticus 22:32).

In addition, chillul hashem is mentioned extensively in Nevi'im and Ketuvim, especially in the Book of Ezekiel. The fact that it appears so frequently throughout the Hebrew Bible demonstrates its centrality and severity. A notable example is 36:20–24 in which the prophet laments the Babylonian captivity. It claims that the reality of exile (specifically the Jewish people living outside their ancestral homeland) is itself a desecration of God's name.

== In rabbinic texts ==
The obligation to refrain from desecrating God's name is one of the 613 commandments in rabbinical enumeration.

In general, if a Jew is faced with the decision to violate a law in the Torah or to lose their life, the Torah mandates that they violate the prohibition rather than give up their life. There are three major exceptions to that rule:

1. If the prohibition is particularly severe (such as murder, idolatry, adultery), then the person must give up their life, rather than violate the prohibition. The most famous example in the Talmud is the story of the woman with seven sons.
2. If the person is forced to violate a prohibition in front of ten other people, the Talmud states that even the smallest commandment may not be violated.
3. If the person is faced with violating a prohibition, even a less severe one, that is currently outlawed by the foreign power, they must give up their life.

The last two exceptions explain that a public sin or a sin done in reverence to a governmental decree constitutes a chillul hashem. The prohibition of desecrating God's Name is so severe that a Jew is required to die rather than violate the sin. Some rishonim (medieval commentaries) maintain that the requirement to give up one's life under these circumstances applies only when the individual is being called upon to sin actively. Thus, if one would remain still and allow himself to be used as a projectile to kill another person rather than give up his own life, that would be permissible.

A chillul hashem can also occur even if a technical prohibition has not been violated. For example, suppose a Jewish leader or someone perceived as righteous is seen acting improperly. In that case, their actions constitute a chillul hashem. Maimonides says that if a scholarly, righteous Jew gets drunk in front of a less-learned Jew, it constitutes a chillul hashem. Thus, any time a Torah scholar or rabbi acts improperly in front of others, they have committed a chillul hashem.

== In law ==
The Supreme Court of Israel have, on several occasions in their rulings, referred to specific actions as a "desecration of God's name" (Chillul Hashem). For instance:

- President of the Supreme Court of Israel Yitzhak Amit compared Israeli settler violence to Chillul Hashem.
- Supreme Court judge Elyakim Rubinstein, regarding offenses committed against a bound and blindfolded person, wrote that "any act that involves cruelty toward another person constitutes a desecration of God's name".
