= Kiddush Hashem =

Sanctification of the Name, precept of Judaism

Kiddush HaShem (Hebrew: קידוש השם "sanctification of the Name") is a precept of Judaism. In rabbinic sources and modern parlance, it refers to private and communal conduct that reflects well, instead of poorly, on the Jewish people.

== Origins ==
The phrase "sanctification of the Name" does not occur in the Hebrew Bible, but the instruction "to sanctify [God]" and the converse command "you shall not profane My holy name" is frequently expressed. Any action by a Jew that brings honor, respect, and glory to God is considered sanctification of His name. In contrast, any behavior or action that disgraces, harms or shames God's name and His Torah is regarded as a chillul Hashem "desecration of the Name". The term appears throughout early Rabbinic literature, including the Sifre Devarim, the Jerusalem Talmud, and the Babylonian Talmud, and its principle – acting in such a manner as to avoid the criticism of gentiles – is cited for halakhic rulings.

Martyrdom during the Hadrianic persecution is called sanctification of the Name in Berachot 20a and Midrash Tehillim. The ultimate act of sanctification of the Name is a Jew who is prepared to sacrifice his life rather than commit idolatry, forbidden sexual acts (such as incest or adultery), or murder. The commandment of kiddush Hashem was introduced by the Tannaim.

== See also ==
- Chillul hashem
- Self-sacrifice in Jewish law
- Fi sabilillah – a similar term in Islam
- Brahmacharya – a term for religious self conduct in Hinduism, Jainism and Buddhism
