= Not one inch (disambiguation) =

Not one inch is an Israel territory-for-peace policy.

Not one inch may refer to

- Not One Inch (book), a 2021 book on the Post-Cold War by Mary Elise Sarotte

== See also ==
- "Not one inch eastward", U.S. Secretary of State James Baker’s assurance to Soviet leader Mikhail Gorbachev; see Treaty on the Final Settlement with Respect to Germany
