= Shir Betar =

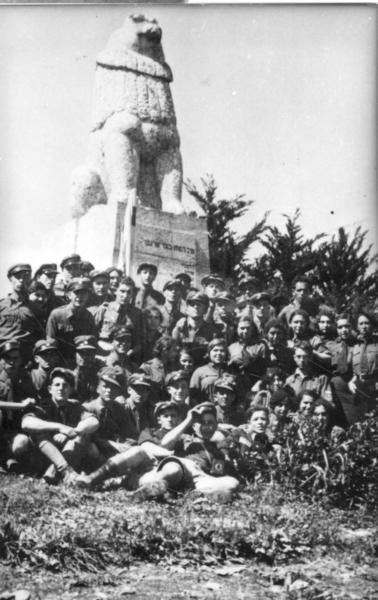
Betar Herzliya students at the grave of Yosef Trumpeldor in Tel Hai.

Shir Betar (Hebrew: שיר בית״ר; in English: "Song of Betar") is a poem written by the Zionist leader Ze'ev Jabotinsky in Paris in 1932. It was immediately adopted as the anthem of the Zionist youth movement Betar. In the poem, Jabotinsky made a call upon Jews to reclaim their self-esteem and adopt an uncompromising spirit to actively fight for the creation of a Jewish nation.
