= Betar =

Revisionist Zionist paramilitary organization

Betar/Beitar
- בית״ר
- Named after: Joseph Trumpeldor and Betar fortress
- Formation: 1923; 103 years ago, Riga, Latvia
- Type: Jewish youth paramilitary organization
- Purpose: Activism and advocacy
- Region served: Worldwide
- Members: 21,000
- General Director: Nerya Meir
- Website: betar.org.il

The Betar Movement (Hebrew: תנועת בית״ר), also spelled Beitar (בית״ר), is a Revisionist Zionist youth movement founded in 1923 in Riga, Latvia, by Vladimir (Ze'ev) Jabotinsky.

During World War II, Betar was a source of recruits for both Jewish regiments that fought alongside the British and Jewish groups fighting the British in Mandatory Palestine. Betar was traditionally linked to the original Herut and then Likud political parties of Jewish pioneers, and was closely affiliated with the Revisionist Zionist militant group Irgun. Some of Israel's most prominent politicians were members of Betar (Betarim) in their youth, notably Prime Ministers Yitzhak Shamir and Menachem Begin.

== Etymology ==
The name Betar (בית״ר) refers both to Betar (fortress), the last Jewish fort to fall in the Bar Kokhba revolt, and to the altered abbreviation of the Hebrew name of the organisation, "Berit Trumpeldor" or "Brit Yosef Trumpeldor" (ברית יוסף תרומפלדור, Joseph Trumpeldor Alliance), named after Joseph Trumpeldor. Although Trumpeldor's name is properly spelt with tet (ט), it was written with taf (ת) so as to produce the acronym.

== History ==
=== Founding and ideology ===
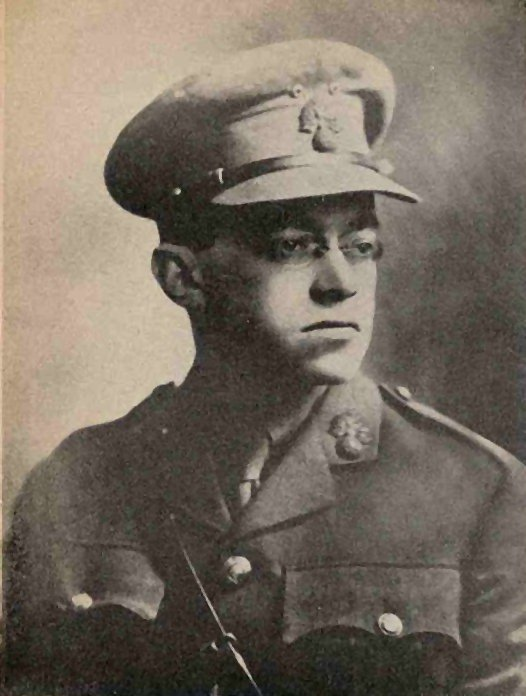
Ze'ev Jabotinsky, the founder and first leader of Betar, shown here in Jewish Legion uniform.

Ze'ev Jabotinsky founded Betar at a meeting of Jewish youth in Riga, Latvia, arranged by Aron Propes in 1923. Jabotinsky spoke of the Arab attacks on the settlement of Tel Hai and other Jewish settlements in the Galilee. He believed that these incidents indicated serious threats to the Jewish Palestinians and could only be addressed by the recreation of the ancient Jewish state of Israel, extending across the entirety of both Palestine and Jordan. This is the defining philosophy of Revisionist Zionism. Jabotinsky proposed creating Betar to foster a new generation of Jews thoroughly indoctrinated in these nationalist ideals and trained for military action against all enemies of Judaism. In 1931, Jabotinsky was elected rosh Betar ("head of Betar") at the first world conference in Danzig.

Joseph Trumpeldor, the leader of the Jewish settlers who were killed at Tel Hai in 1920, served as Betar's primary role model. A disabled man with only one arm, he led his people in the futile defense of the settlement and reportedly died with the words, "Never mind, it is good to die for our country" (Hebrew: "אין דבר ,טוב למות בעד ארצנו"). This was particularly significant given that the Jews did not yet have a country: Trumpeldor was referring to sacrificing one's life to further the establishment of an independent Jewish state. The words of Shir Betar ("The Betar Song"), written by Jabotinsky, include a line that quotes Trumpeldor's last words of "never mind". As the song expresses, Betar youth were to be as "proud, generous, and fierce [alternately translated as 'cruel']" as Trumpeldor, and as ready to sacrifice themselves for Israel.

=== Expansion and pre-war activities ===
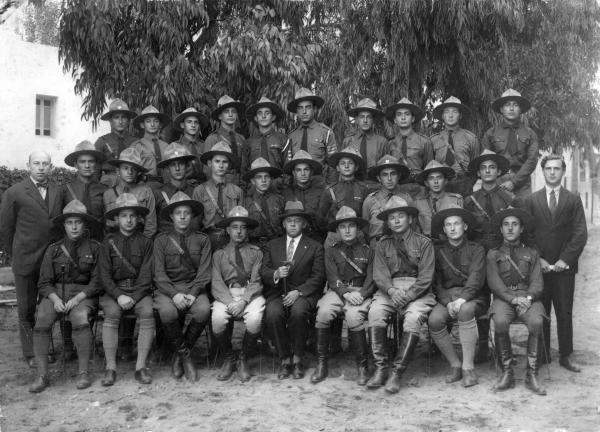
Jabotinsky in the company of Betar commanders, Palestine

Despite resistance from both Zionist and non-Zionist Jews, Betar quickly gained a large following in Poland, Palestine, Latvia, Lithuania, Austria, Czechoslovakia, Germany, and elsewhere. It was particularly successful in Poland, which had Europe's largest Jewish population at the time.

It was one of several right-wing youth movements that arose at that time and adopted special salutes and uniforms influenced by fascism.

In 1934, Poland was home to 40,000 of Betar's 70,000 members. Routine Betar activities in Warsaw included military drilling, Hebrew instruction, and encouragement to learn English. Militia groups organized by Betar Poland helped to defend against attacks by the anti-Semitic ONR. The interwar Polish government helped Betar with military training. Some members admired the Polish nationalist camp and imitated some of its aspects.

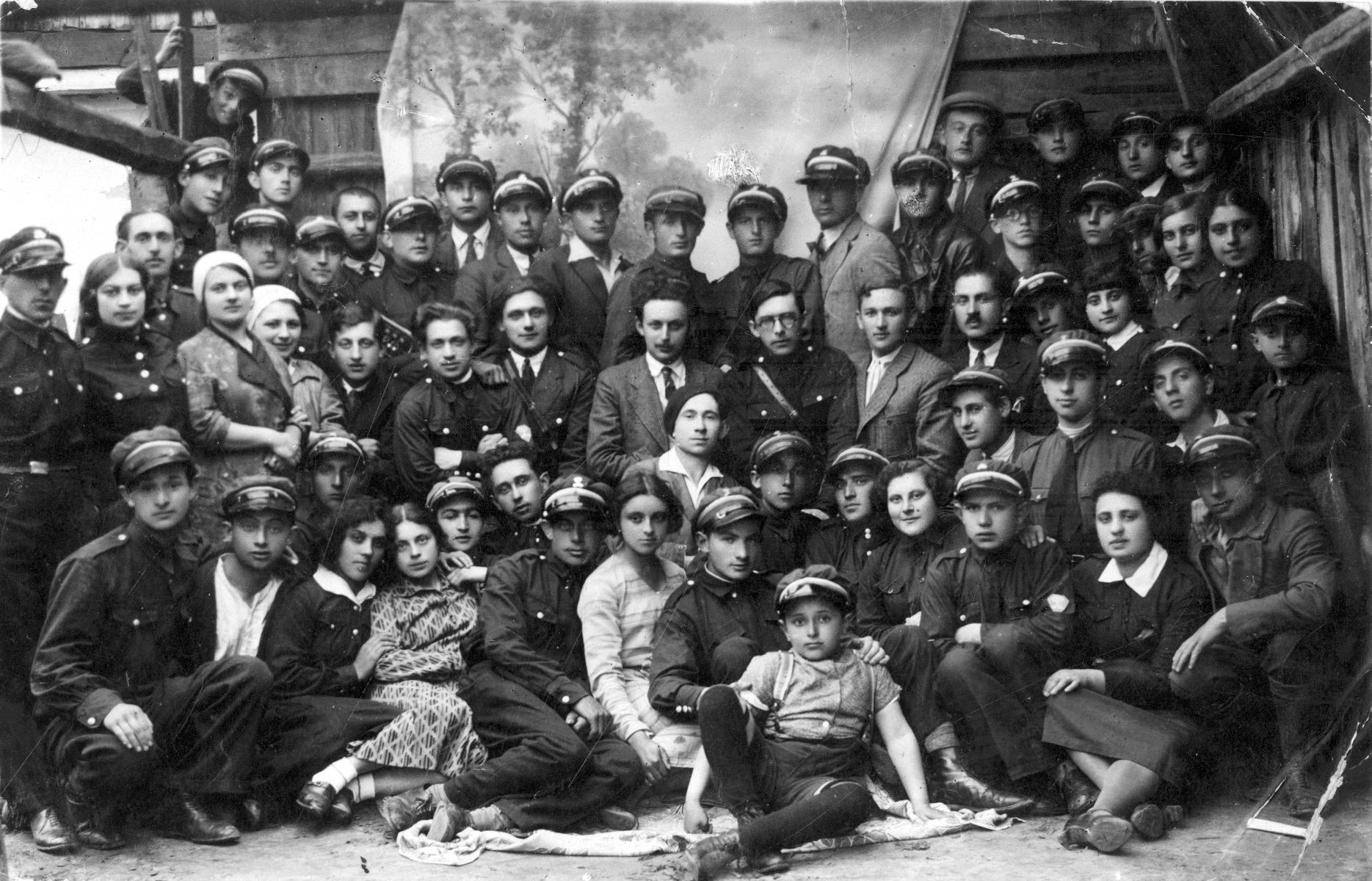
Members of Betar in Europe, circa 1934

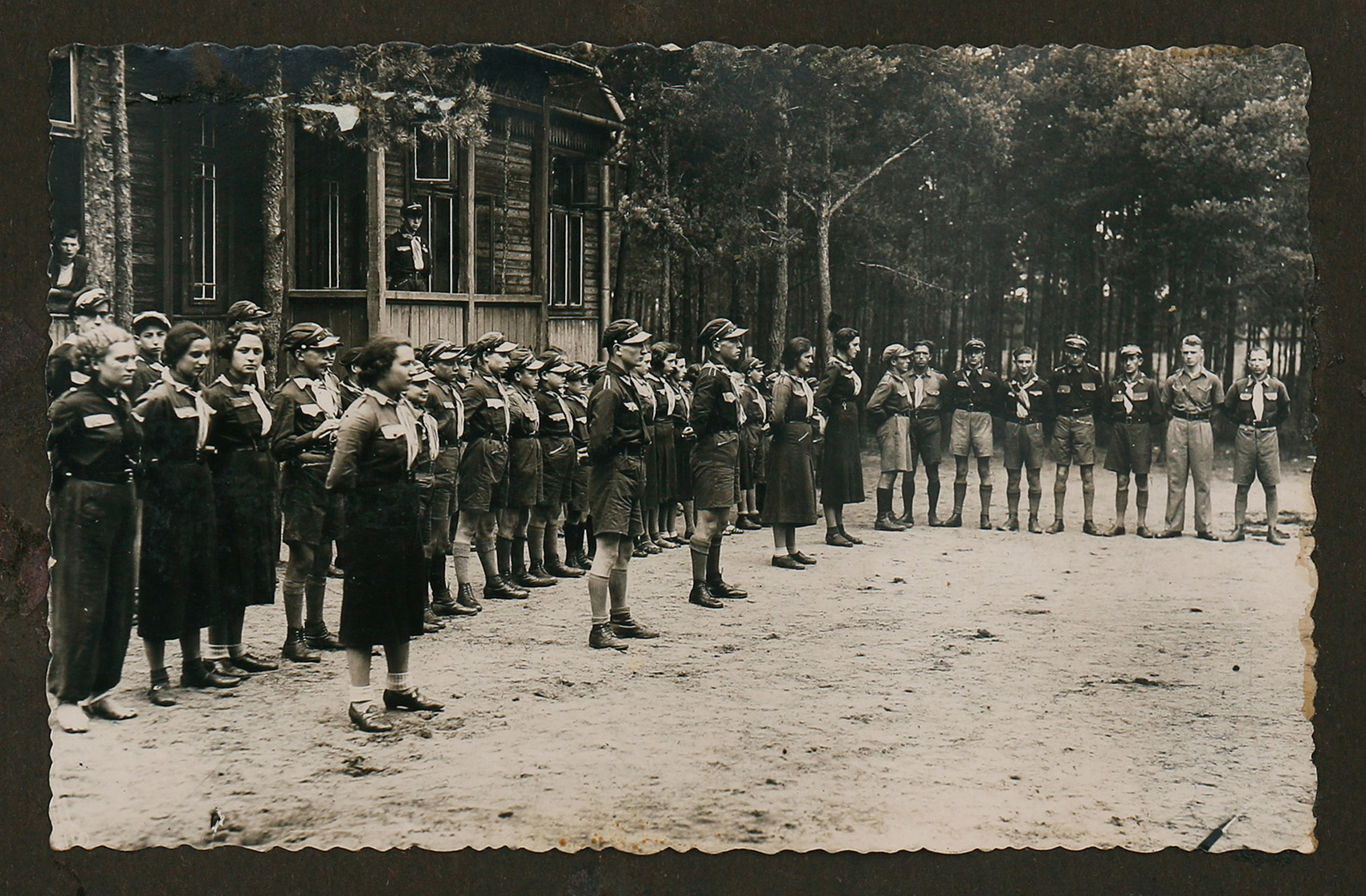
Members of Betar movement at a summer camp in the Polish resort town Zakopane in 1935

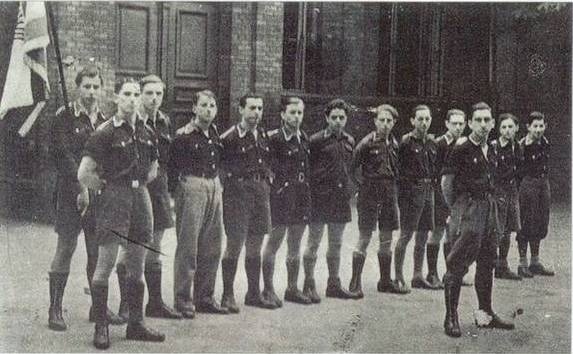
Betar formation in Berlin in 1936

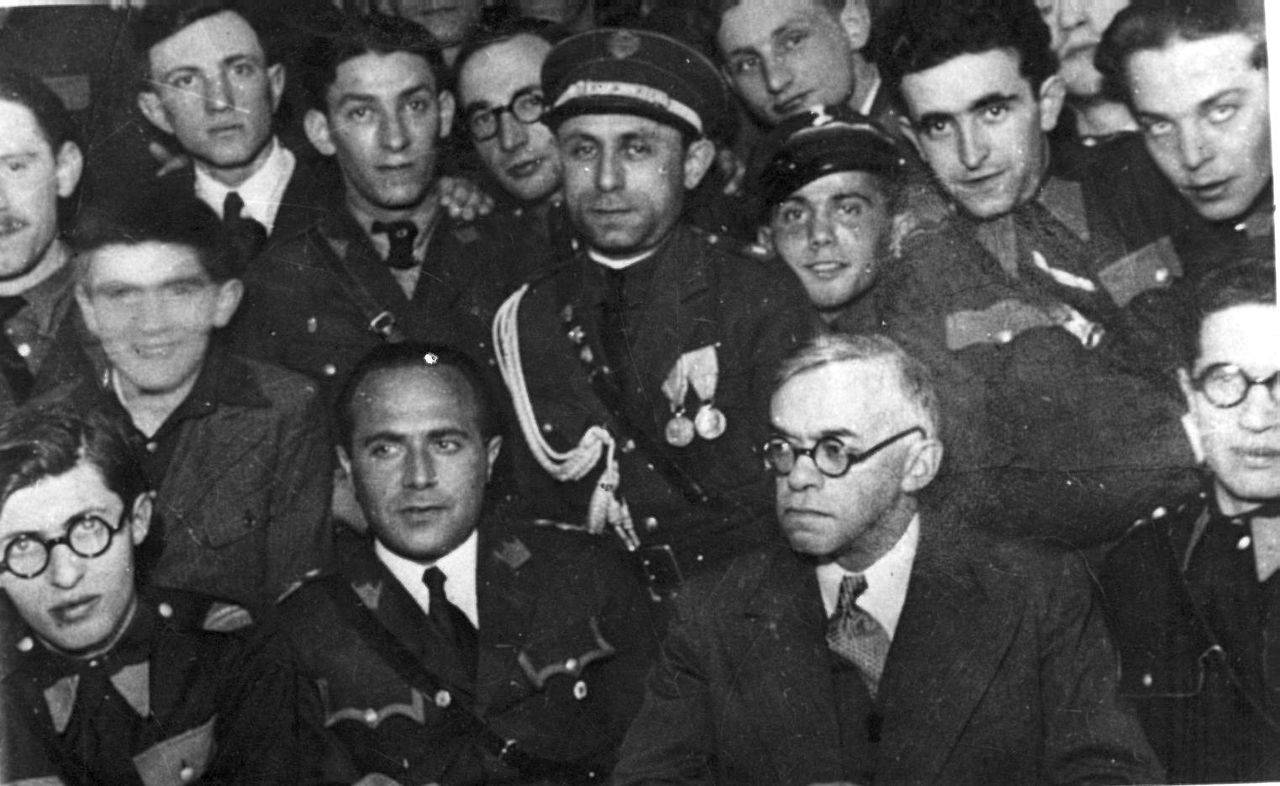
Jabotinsky (bottom right) meeting with Betar leaders in Warsaw. Bottom left Menachem Begin (1939)

=== World War II and the Holocaust ===
During World War II, Betar members, including former Polish Army officers, founded Żydowski Związek Wojskowy (ŻZW; "Jewish Military Union"), which fought in the Warsaw Ghetto Uprising. Mordechai Anielewicz, the head of the other major uprising group, Żydowska Organizacja Bojowa (ZOB; "Jewish Combat Organization"), also gained his military training in Betar. He was the secretary of the prominent Betar Warsaw organization in 1938. He left it to join and quickly take leadership of the left-wing Zionist Hashomer Hatzair group in Warsaw.

In the summer of 1941, Julek (Joel/Jakób) Brandt, a Betar leader from Chorzów who was a relative of Samuel Brandt, the chairman of the Hrubieszów Judenrat (Jewish Council), arranged for several hundred Betar members from the Warsaw Ghetto to work on local farms and estates, including one in Dłużniów and Werbkowice. Most of the Betar youth were killed in the spring of 1942 and in subsequent months, together with the local Jewish population, but a few returned to the ghetto and later took part in the Warsaw Ghetto uprising in the ranks of the ŻZW. Brandt escaped from a transport heading for the death camp at Sobibor. He was denounced by local peasants, who turned him over to the Gestapo in Hrubieszów. There, he was put to work by Gestapo Obersturmbannführer Ebner, who named him chief of a small work camp. At the end of 1942 or the beginning of 1943, Ebner shot and killed him.

Jewish fighters under the leadership of Josef Glazman, head of Betar Lithuania, battled the Nazis alongside the Lithuanian partisans in the forests outside Vilnius; anti-Nazi partisans in most other nations, however, were unwilling to fight alongside Betar. The Song Of The Partisans, an anthem traditionally sung by Holocaust survivors on Yom HaShoah, was written in memory of and dedication to Glazman.

From 1937 to 1944, Betar aided the widespread immigration of Jews to Palestine in violation of the British Mandate's immigration quotas, which had not been increased despite the surge of refugees from the Nazi persecution and murder of Jews. In total, as part of Operation Action, Betar was, according to one of its organisers, William R. Perl, partly responsible for smuggling an estimated 40,000 Jews into Palestine under such restrictions.

=== Armed struggle in Mandatory Palestine ===
In 1938, David Raziel became the head of both Betar and the Irgun Zvai Leumi ("National Military Organisation", known as "Etzel"). The Irgun's anthem was the third and final verse of the Betar song. Raziel died shortly into World War II, while taking part in a failed British sabotage mission against German interests in the Habbaniyeh area of Iraq's Anbar Province.

The tactics of the Irgun-Betar coalition were at odds with the mainstream Zionist establishment's policy of restraint in response to Arab attacks. For most of the 1930s and '40s, the two organizations typically bombed collections of Arab civilians in response to any attack of any kind on any Palestinian Jews. The Irgun worked closely with Betar in Palestine and worldwide, particularly with respect to illegal immigration into Palestine, but they remained organizationally and structurally separate. As British policy and Jewish needs/demands grew more opposed, Betar and the Irgun stepped up their military campaign against the British, based primarily on guerrilla tactics of sabotage and assassination.

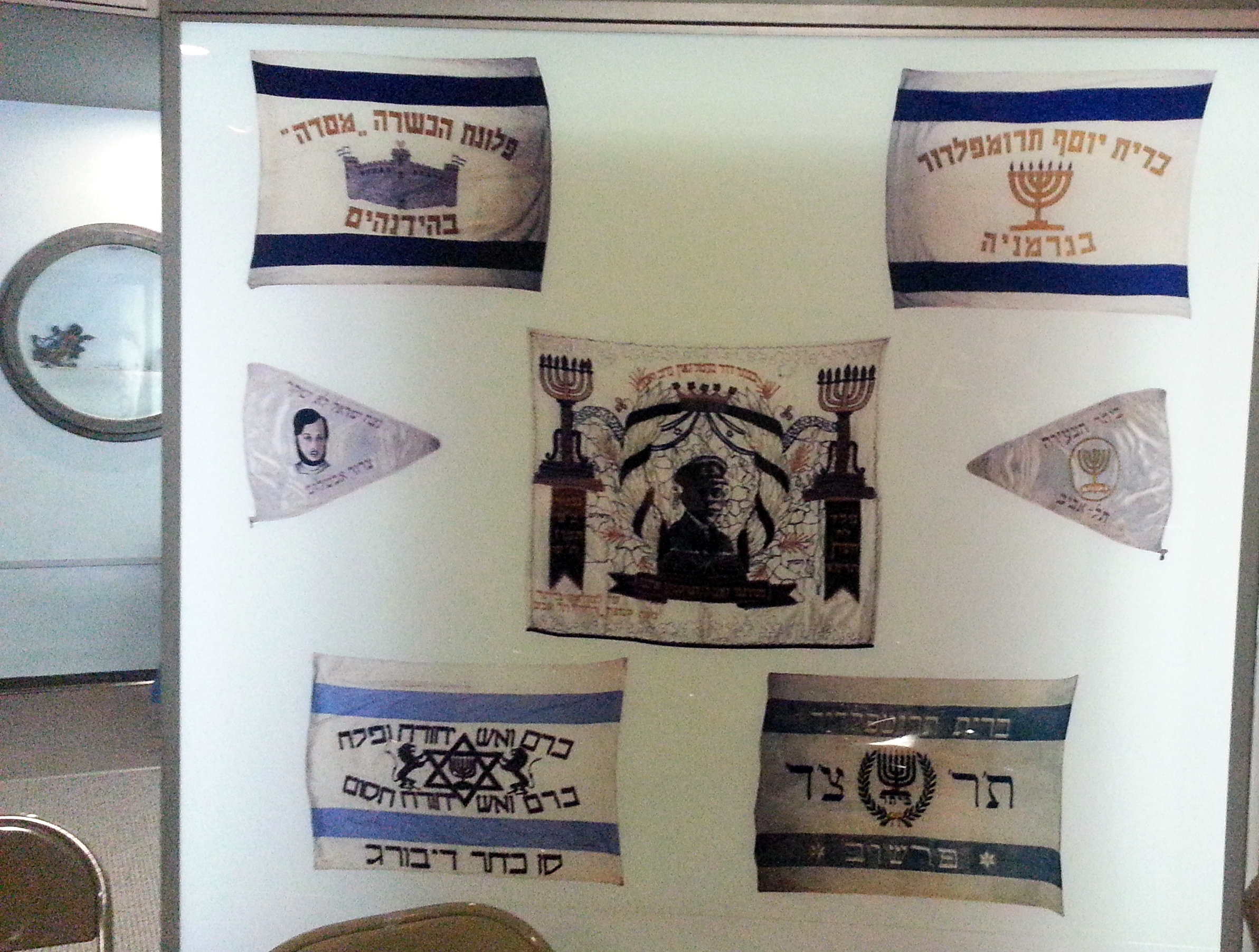
Flags of the Betar youth movement displayed at the Jabotinsky Institute in Tel Aviv

With the outbreak of World War II, Raziel and Jabotinsky declared an unconditional ceasefire against the British, as Britain and the Zionists had a common enemy in Germany. Raziel's second-in-command, Avraham "Yair" Stern, broke away and formed the Stern Group, later renamed LEHI (Lohamei Herut Yisrael, "Freedom Fighters For Israel"), which continued to attack British targets. Radical elements of Betar joined LEHI but most stayed with the Irgun.

Future Israeli Prime Minister Menachem Begin, who had headed Betar Poland before World War II, reached Palestine at the war's end and took immediate control of both Betar Palestine and the Irgun. He led the two organizations in their contribution to the 1948–49 war that established the initial borders of the newly proclaimed state of Israel. Betar and the Irgun remained functionally intermingled, consistently sharing leadership and manpower. By contrast, the Haganah, the official defense organization of the Jewish Agency, and its military wing, the Palmach, had practically no Betar members.

Members of Betar were also instrumental in setting up Israel's navy, the Israeli Sea Corps. The first Israeli plane was flown into Palestine by Jabotinsky's son, Eri, at the time a member of the Betar World Executive.

=== Decline and modern era ===
Since the 1970s, Betar has suffered a decline in membership and activities. It remains much involved in Zionist activism, however. Tagar, Betar's young adult movement, was active on many university campuses throughout North America during the 1980s, as part of the Revisionist Zionist Association, and Betar played a major part in raising the awareness of Soviet oppression of Jews, and fighting for the right of Soviet Jews to emigrate to Israel. It remains relatively prominent in Australia and in Cleveland, Ohio.

In the early 21st century, Betar had around 21,000 members globally.

== Legacy in Israeli politics ==
Many of Israel's most prominent conservatives were "graduates" of Betar, including former prime ministers Menachem Begin, Yitzhak Shamir, and Ehud Olmert, and former Defense Minister Moshe Arens. Former Likud/Kadima minister (in several offices) Tzipi Livni MK was a youth Betarist. Yoel Hasson MK was formerly national head of Betar in Israel. Livni and Hasson later formed Hatnuah, which in 2015 allied with Labor in the center-left Zionist Union. Israel's current Ambassador to the UN, Danny Danon, is a Betarist and a former leader of the World Betar Organization.

== Global chapters ==
=== Africa ===
==== South Africa ====
Once one of the largest youth movements in South Africa, Betar South Africa has since dwindled greatly. Headquartered in Johannesburg, the group used to host a 3-week summer camp each December and annual programs to send youth to Israel. Like Betar Australia, Betar South Africa saw many of its members permanently emigrate to Israel.

=== Tunisia ===
The group was active in Tunisia and published several periodicals, including Cahiers du Bétar.

=== Australia ===
Betar Australia is an active movement with branches in Melbourne, Sydney, and Queensland. Each of these branches organizes many activities, functions, and Jewish youth camps in each state. Betar Australia is a member of the Australasian Zionist Youth Council.

Betar Australia was initially established in Melbourne and branched out to New South Wales (Sydney) and Queensland (Brisbane). In 1948, Betar members from Harbin, China and elsewhere reestablished Betar in Melbourne to help provide refuge for the many Jewish survivors of the Holocaust who remained without assistance. Later, in 1953, Betar expanded to Sydney where Betar NSW was established by Jewish immigrants from China such as their first mefaked (director) Hans Dreyer and Bob Shteinman. Further, Betar expanded to Canberra and Brisbane, although the Canberra branch did not continue to stay active. The Queensland branch celebrated its 50th reunion in 2006.

The Sydney movement has experienced various periods of expansion and contraction, reaching its zenith in the early 1990s. During that time, winter camps regularly attracted over 220 chanichim (campers). Summer camps were also large, often held in conjunction with the rest of Betar Australia. Several federal camps were held during that time, including Jamboree in Toowoomba, Queensland. Betar Australia also holds annual seminars for senior members as well as educational and training conventions for its senior leaders.

Betar has been at the forefront of Jewish activism in Australia. Betar Australia began protesting Nazi supporters and sympathizers in 1952, when it released pigeons and stink bombs during a concert by allegedly pro-Nazi German pianist Walter Gieseking in Melbourne. The group battled neo-Nazi groups in the 1960s, and in the 1970s and 1980s, it spearheaded the protests of the Sydney Jewish community on behalf of Soviet Jewry. The group was instrumental in supporting the annual protest outside the Soviet Consulate in Trelawney Street, Woollahra, which occurred each Pesach, and has supported mass protests outside the Bolshoi Ballet and the Moscow Circus on Ice at the Sydney Entertainment Centre. It also protested Soviet Foreign Minister Eduard Shevardnadze's visit to Canberra and Sydney. In the 1970s, the group demonstrated against a visit of the General Union of Palestine Students to the Australian Union of Students after the latter had moved to the political left. In later years, Betar Australia took the initiative to organize community protests outside the Iraqi Embassy in Canberra during the Gulf War and outside the Iranian Embassy to protest what it perceived to be Iranian state sponsorship of terrorism. The group also marched in front of the German Consulate in Sydney to protest what it perceived to be a resurgence of anti-Semitism in postwar Germany. In 2004, Betar Sydney was active in protesting Hanan Ashrawi's receiving of the Sydney Premier's peace prize.

Australia Betarim leaders very often emigrate to Israel and maintain close relations between the two nations. Betar Australia sends several members to Israel's hasbarah programs each year. This pilgrimage is generally made after the completion of year 12 and the program spans the course of a year. After completing the program, the leaders are considered to be, "Bogrim" a more senior title for a youth leader.

=== Europe ===
==== Italy ====
Recently created, the new branch in Rome was founded by an Italian teen group, together with betarím from all over the world.

==== United Kingdom ====
Betar UK existed in the late 1930s but had ceased functioning when the state of Israel was established. The movement's revitalization began in 1974 with Eli Joseph with the assistance of Eric Graus and George Evnine. Yisrael Medad of the World Betar Movement arrived in the UK in 1975 and built a winter camp at Sherborne School in Dorset, England, a summer camp in north-west France, and a two-week summer camp in Israel. Branches were opened in various locations in Greater London and elsewhere. Educational and cultural activities were organized and demonstrations were held on the themes of Soviet Jewry and Jews in Arab lands as well as on local British issues. Betar shared offices with the Herut Movement at 73, Compayne Gardens, London, at the "Tel Chai House". When that property was sold, Betar held its meetings at various locations in Stamford Hill and other Greater London areas.

Anti-Zionist demonstrations and BDS picketing occurred weekly outside the flagship Marks & Spencer store on Oxford Street in London from 2004 until 2010. Betar and Tagar UK organised and led a weekly pro-Israel counter-demonstration during that period.

Betar lost its registered charity status in 2004 when the Charity Commission for England and Wales stated that Betar "appeared to be in furtherance of a political purpose rather than a charitable purpose".

Many of Betar’s members have emigrated to Israel over the years. Betar UK currently has a small active group of around 150 members, mainly in London. It is involved in Zionist activism, self-defence and martial arts training, government lobbying, criticism of what its members regard as biased, anti-Israel articles in media, and organises and supports pro-Israel demonstrations. Its website has not been updated for a number of years but Betar members are still known to be active and are considering permanent headquarters in London.

=== North America ===
==== Canada ====
Betar Toronto currently focuses on opposing the Israeli apartheid analogy. In February 2006 at the University of Toronto, Tagar organized a "Know Radical Islam Week" featuring activist Nonie Darwish, former Sudanese slave Simon Deng, Salim Mansur (a Muslim activist speaking on gay rights in the Middle East), and presentations by Honest Reporting and Palestinian Media Watch. The event was co-sponsored by the Toronto Secular Alliance and other allied groups. Betar has also worked in Toronto and Montreal with off-campus organizations, such as the Canadian Coalition for Democracies, to promote the importance of secular and participatory politics in Canada. In March 2007, Betar-Tagar at the University of Toronto changed its name to 'Zionists at U of T'.

Betar-Tagar was active in Montreal and Toronto during the 1980s Lebanon-Israel conflict. A revival of Betar occurred in Montreal on November 9, 2006, as an event called "Taking Liberties: Terrorism in the West". It featured keynote speaker Salim Mansur and was the first film screening of Obsession: Radical Islam's War Against the West at McGill University. It was co-organized by Conservative McGill students. At McGill University in March 2007, Betar Montreal held a "Radical Islam Awareness Week" similar to the one at the University of Toronto the year before. Speakers included David B. Harris, a Canadian lawyer and security specialist, and John Thompson of the Mackenzie Institute. Concurrent with the 2007 Montreal program, Betar in Toronto held "Freedom and Democracy Week" at the University of Toronto. Speakers included Ezra Levant, co-founder of the Western Standard newspaper, and Jonah Goldberg of the National Review.

==== United States ====
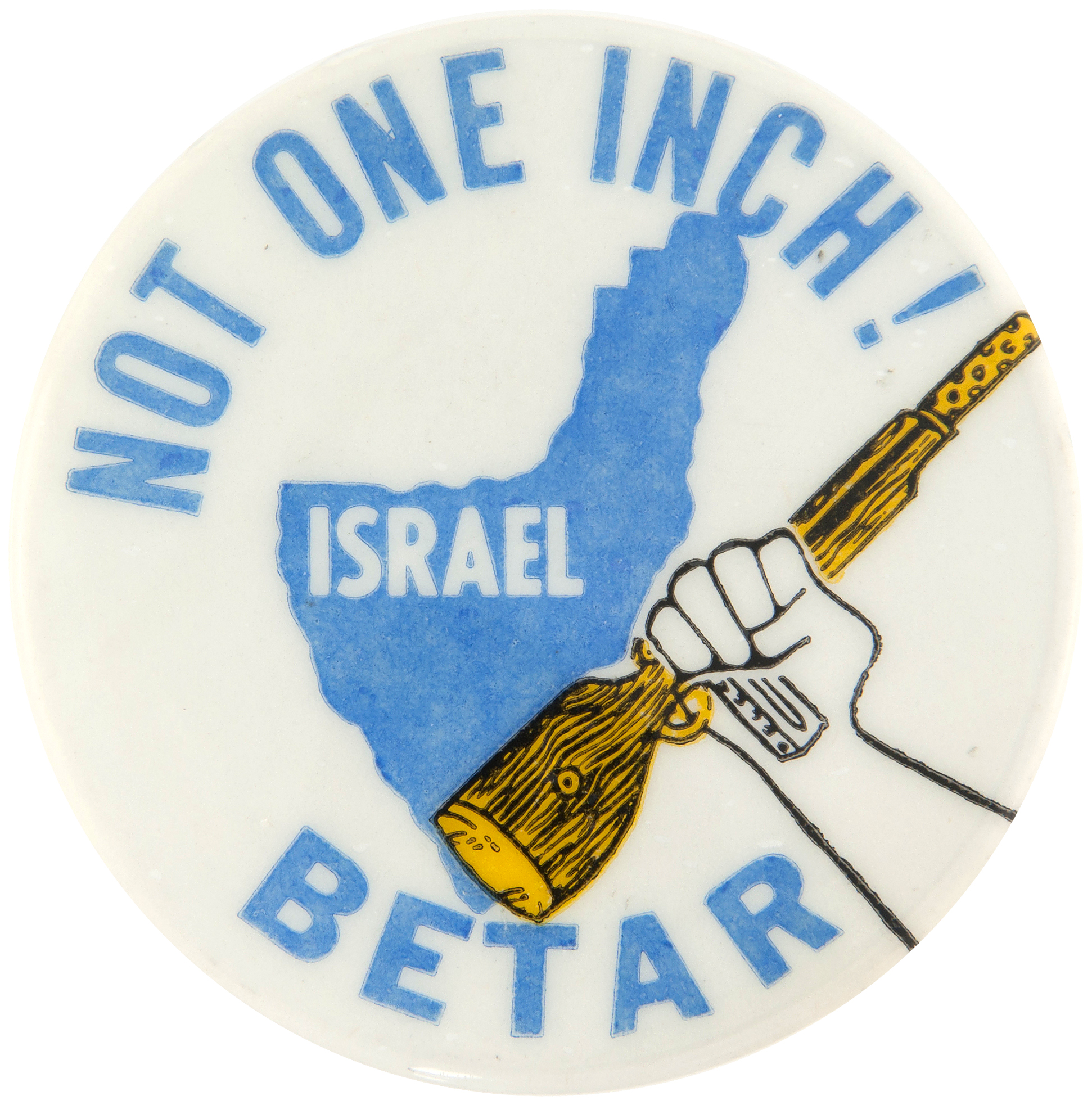
1977 Betar "Not One Inch" pinback button

The first U.S. branch of Betar was founded in October 1929, led principally by Joseph Beder, William Katz, Haim Messer, and Israel Posnansky. Beder had visited Palestine under the Mandate in the spring of 1929 and come in contact with Betar members there. The first activity of Betar USA was a Hanukkah party alongside local branches that already existed in eastern New York and on Manhattan's Lower East Side.

When the USSR imprisoned the ailing Mikhail Stern because his sons were openly Zionist, seven Betarim from New York City went to the USSR and offered to serve his sentence in his stead. The Soviet government refused their proposal and deported them. The group was led by Fred Pierce and included Elie Yossef and Gilad Freund.

Betar maintains a Shaliach in New York City and Cleveland, Ohio. The Cleveland chapter offers a fall and spring camp that is open to all cities. Betar offers summer and winter tours of Israel. It is one of the few movements that offer students a chance to visit the West Bank. Both programs allow students to spend time at Kedumin, Itamar, Alon Moreh East Jerusalem, and Hebron. They have officially adopted Kedumin as a sister city and spend an extensive time volunteering there. The winter tour is for college-age students and runs in late December.

During the period of the early to mid-1990s, Ronn Torossian served as National President and increased Betar USA membership into the hundreds. Previous U.S. leaders included Roey Urman, Glenn Mones, Barry Liben, Fred Pierce (early to mid-1970s), and Benny Rosen (1960s). In addition to its programs for younger students, Betar USA has an affiliated program for college-age students called Tagar. Betar strongly promotes the emigration of American Jews to Israel.

Previous Shaliachs in the U.S. have included Sallai Meridor, former Israeli ambassador to the U.S. (late 1980s); Eli Cohen, former Israeli ambassador to Japan (early 1990s); Tova Vagimi; Sharon Tzur; Yitzhak Kerstein; Shlomo Ariav; and Shlomi Levy.

Following years of dormancy for the movement in America, Torossian established Betar US in 2024 following the October 7 attacks, with no formal connection to the global organization. The group, which Haaretz says is tied to Benjamin Netanyahu's Likud party, has been labeled hate group and added to the Anti-Defamation League's extremism database for its embrace of "Islamophobia [and] harras[ing] Muslims".

In January 2026, after an investigation by Attorney General of New York Letitia James into alleged violations of New York civil rights law and violent harassment based on "explicit hostility" towards protected groups, Betar US shut down its New York branch, which ran its operational structure as part of the settlement.

=== Israel ===
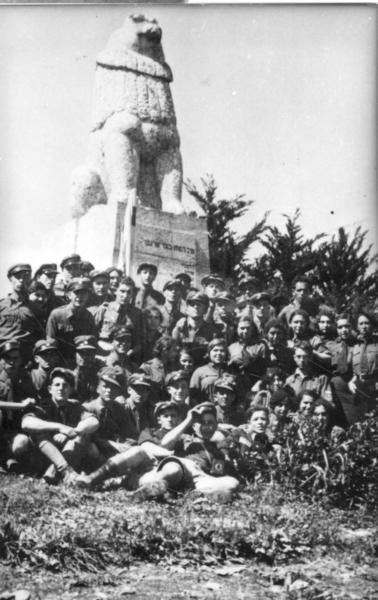
Betar members in front of the monument to Joseph Trumpeldor in Tel Hai (c. 1940s)

Once a vibrant movement tied to the opposition Herut Party, Betar's following in Israel has declined since the 1970s due to a generally transformed political landscape. An important change has been the rise of religious conservatives in Israel. Though Betar had many of the same political goals as the rapidly growing Gush Emunim ("Bloc of the Faithful") and Bnei Akiva youth movements (tied to the National Religious Party), they remained a secular movement. They did not join the latter organizations in seeking annexation of the contested West Bank and Gaza Strip. During the 1980s, as a result of the Camp David Accords negotiated by Menachem Begin (the leader of Herut and its successor movement Likud), a similar effect occurred due to the rise of the "Secular Right". The more extreme movements drew youth away from Betar.

As the Likud party under Benjamin Netanyahu moved away from the traditional values of Revisionist Zionism, Betar drew criticism from Israeli conservatives who identified as ideological purists. While Betar had consistently been a source of powerful political figures in Israel, its leaders were criticized for placing partisan political expediency above greater ideological priorities. In the late 1990s, Benny Begin broke away from Likud to form Herut – The National Movement.

=== South America ===
==== Brazil ====
Betar Brasil is an active movement with branches in Porto Alegre, Rio de Janeiro, and São Paulo. Each of these branches organize consistent activities, events, both summer and winter camps (Machanot) as well as a lot of other community initiatives. There are also frequent National Seminars and some activities are carried out by all three branches together. Betar has gained significant strength in Brazil by the end of the 2010s decade and seems to continue growing considerably. In 2018, the Betar branch in Rio de Janeiro was officially inaugurated, under the leadership of Theodor Fuchs, Nicholas Beznos, Gabriel Uram, Guilherme Jaffé, Felipe Lazkani, Gabriela Sznajderman, Eduardo Oliven, Bernardo Press, Bruno Sznajderman, Gabriel Kac Nigri, Paulo Orenbuch, Davi Beznos, Caio Cohen, and Victor Cohen. By 2019 São Paulo's branch was established too, with the leadership of Marcos Zlotnik, Raphael Harari, David Breslauer and Ilan Charchat. The revival of Betar Brasil was only possible with the help of Juliana Katz, Mono Sommer (World Betar's Rosh Chinuch), and Nerya Meir (CEO of World Betar). In 2020, the first Hanagah Artzit was formed after decades. Jabotinsky's ideas were finally reborn in the two largest Jewish communities of the country. Today, each branch counts with more than 50 betarím, including madrichim and chanichim.

==== Uruguay ====
One of the largest youth movements in Uruguay, Betar Uruguay has expanded greatly. Its branch is located in Montevideo and there are weekly activities carried out as well as Jewish summer camps (Machanot) and Continental Seminars.

== See also ==
- Beitar Jerusalem FC
- Betar Naval Academy
- "The East Bank of the Jordan" (also known as "Two Banks has the Jordan"), a poem by Ze'ev Jabotinsky that became the slogan of Betar
- Para-fascism
- Shir Betar
- Zionist youth movement
