= The East Bank of the Jordan (song) =

Song

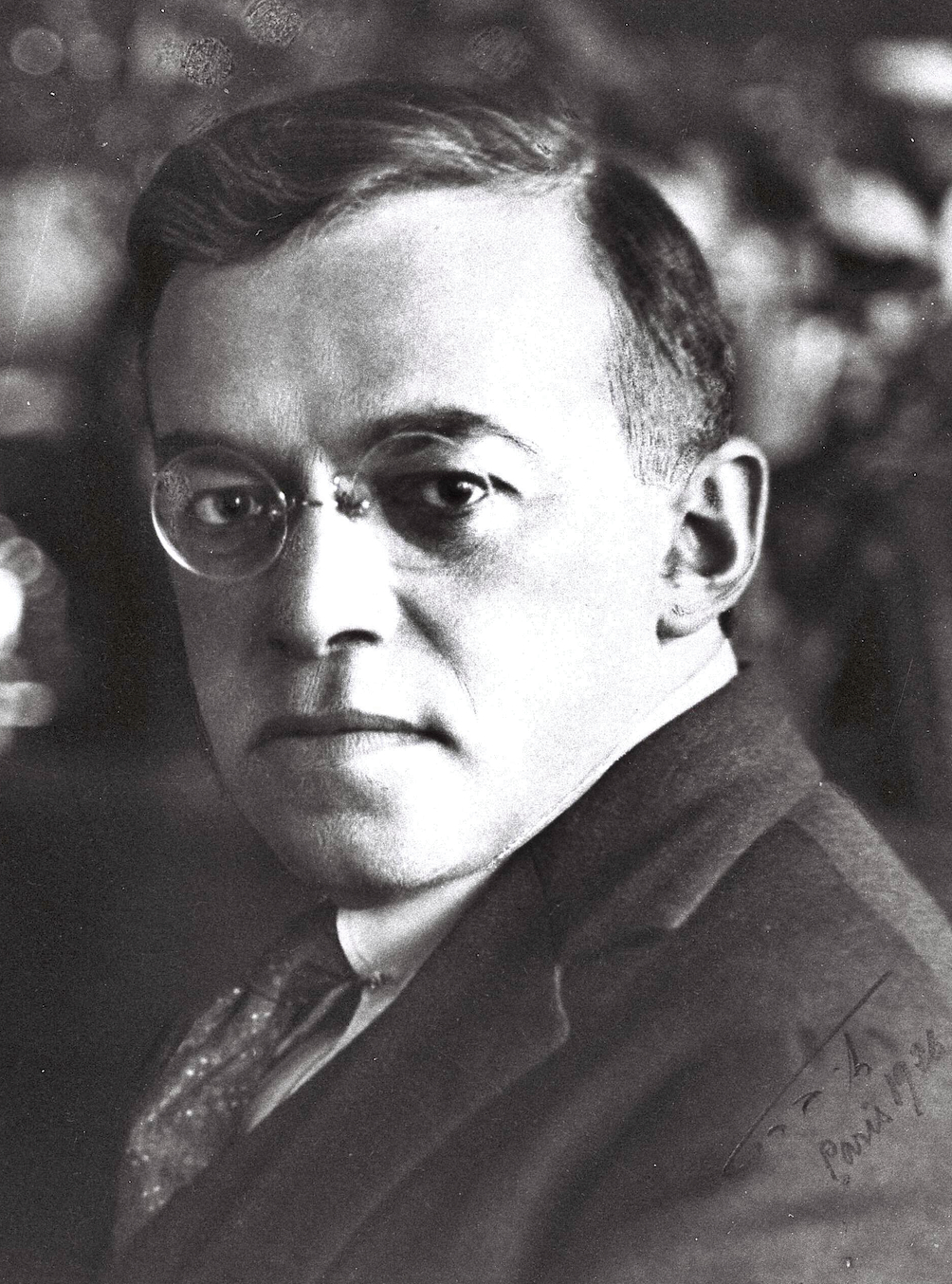
Ze'ev Jabotinsky

Irgun emblem

"The East Bank of the Jordan" (Hebrew: שמאל הירדן, Smol Ha'Yarden, also known as שתי גדות לירדן, Shtei Gadot La'Yarden, lit. Two Banks to the Jordan) is a song written by Ze'ev Jabotinsky, the Revisionist Zionist leader. The song became one of the most known leading songs of the Revisionist Zionist youth movement Betar. The song includes four verses. Each verse ends with the following line which is the main political message and theme of the poem:

"Two Banks has the Jordan – This is ours and, that is as well."

Jabotinsky wrote the song in 1929 while visiting Paris. The first version of the song was handed to the Zionist Students' union "Yardeniya" in Kaunas, on 18 November 1929. In a later version, which is the one known today, the song was published in one of the Yishuv's daily newspapers, Do'ar HaYom, on 11 April 1930.

The song was written seven years after the decision by the British Government to divide the territory of the British Mandate, in which there was to be established a national home for the Jewish people, into two territories, and to establish on one of its sides, on the east of the Jordan river (Transjordan), the Jordanian Kingdom. Prior to that decision, Chaim Weizmann had raised historical and practical arguments in favor of keeping Greater Israel, on both sides of the river. However, the World Zionist Organization accepted the borders that were outlined by the British government, and the removal of the territory east of the Jordan River from the British Mandate's boundaries, and preferred to focus on developing the Land of Israel west of the Jordan. The Revisionist Zionist movement and its founder, Ze'ev Jabotinsky, and also some in the socialist Ahdut HaAvoda, continued to perceive the land east of the Jordan River as suitable for Jewish building, and a territory that should be included within the future Jewish state. The Irgun's emblem included an image of most parts of the Land of Israel in the original borders of the British Mandate.

The song "The East Bank of the Jordan" reflects the idea of the Jewish state existing on both sides of the Jordan River. In the first verse of the song, Jabotinsky compares the Jordan River to a spinal cord. The second verse also emphasizes that the Jordan River is located in the midst of the Land of Israel. The third verse includes an additional ideological message, in which everyone in Greater Israel will live in peace and dignity:

"From the wealth of our land there shall prosper The Arab, the Christian, and the Jew.".

The fourth and last verse ends up with a religious oath that is a paraphrase of the biblical verse of Psalms: 137:5 – "If I forget thee, O Jerusalem, let my right hand forget her cunning":

"Let my right hand wither If I forget the east bank of the Jordan.".

This part of the land of Israel is referred to in the song as "The East of the river". Just as one may view Transjordan while sailing along the river's stream, one can travel along the Left Bank of the Seine river in France, where Jabotinsky was writing the song.

The composition was originally written in Kaunas by Tzvi Girsh Livshin, a close friend of Zeev Jabotinsky. Another version was later composed by Mordechai Zeira, in 1932.

The main theme of the song also influenced other Zionists' poems, and its main theme appears also in Raise Up the Barricades, by Michael Eshbal, another well known Betar youth movement poem, which calls for the establishment of the Jewish state "on both sides of the Jordan".

== See also ==
- Iron Wall (essay)
