= Elie Yossef =

Israeli educator and political activist

Elie Yossef (also Eli Joseph, Hebrew: אֵלִי יוֹסֵף) is a London-born Israeli educator and political activist.

Eli Yossef grew up in London and attended the Hasmonean High School where he established Betar England in 1973. In 1975, Yossef emigrated to Israel and served in the Golani and Paratroopers brigades of the Israel Defense Forces. After completing his military service, Yossef studied at Machon Meir and Hebrew University. In 1988, Yossef founded a Youth Aliyah (Aliyat haNoar) high school for new immigrants from France. In 1997, he organized a military preparatory program for Jewish students from abroad interested in volunteering in Israel's army.

One of his major causes is freeing Jonathan Pollard. In January 2000, Yossef conducted a hunger strike on Pollard's behalf outside of Israel's Parliament. He argued that anyone who passes classified information to the State of Israel regarding enemy intentions to harm Israel is morally innocent even if technically guilty by American law. In 2002 Yossef traveled to numerous Israeli high-schools and spoke of Pollard's plight as a moral national issue. Yossef's efforts to free Pollard has led him to collaborate with former Prisoners of Zion Natan Sharansky and Rabbi Yosef Mendelevitch over the years, highlighting the similarities between their situations in the Soviet Union and Pollard's in the United States.

Yossef has urged the Israeli government to establish what happened to Raoul Wallenberg, a Swedish diplomat who saved countless Jews from the Holocaust during World War II but was arrested following the war by Soviet agents and disappeared.

Following the violent confrontation at Amona between the Israeli police and settler teenagers in early 2006, Yossef led Mehi activists on a three-week hunger strike vigil protesting violence between Jews. The activists displayed banners and handed out fliers calling on the Israeli government and settler leadership to seek out ways to avoid future bloodshed.

Yossef has called on the government of Israel to cut diplomatic ties to Russia due to Russia's involvement in Iran's nuclear development program. Yossef told Israel National Radio's Yishai Fleisher that "the Jewish People must find the moral courage to stand up to super-powers in such situations."

Yossef actively opposed the Camp David Accords with Egypt and Israel's subsequent withdrawal from the Sinai Peninsula). Yossef has referred to himself as a "Humanitarian Zionist".

Yossef now works as a real estate agent. In August 2005 he founded the Eli Joseph Jerusalem Real Estate company.

== See also ==
- Revisionist Zionism
- Zionism
