= Cahiers du Bétar =

Zionist magazine in Tunisia (1938–1946)

- Editor: Jacques Silvera
- Former editors: Alfred Louzoun
- Categories: Political magazine
- Frequency: Monthly
- Founder: Bétar
- Founded: 1938
- Final issue: 1946
- Country: Tunisia
- Based in: Tunis
- Language: French
- OCLC: 985893813

Cahiers du Bétar (French: Notebooks of Betar) was a monthly Zionist magazine which was published in Tunis, Tunisia, between 1938 and 1946. Its title was a reference to the revisionist Zionist youth movement, Bétar. The subtitle of the magazine was Organe mensuel d’éducation Juive (French: Monthly organ of Jewish education).

== History and profile ==
Cahiers du Bétar was established in 1938 as a successor to another Jewish periodical entitled ha-Ivri. It was published by the Bétar movement's Tunisia branch on a monthly basis. Alfred Louzoun edited the monthly of which headquarters was in Tunis. He later assumed the post of director, and Jacques Silvera became the editor of the magazine in 1939. Its circulation was about 1,200 copies.

Cahiers du Bétar was a supporter of the right-wing Zionism of Vladimir Jabotinsky. However, it did not manage to have significant influence as its successor ha-Ivri. It ceased publication in 1946.
