= Johan Oldert =

South African painter and sculptor

- Born: 1912; Rotterdam
- Died: 1984 (aged 71–72); Johannesburg

Johan Oldert (1912–1984) was a South African painter and sculptor known for oil paintings, especially landscapes, and sculpture: in particular bronze portraiture.

== Biography ==
Johan Oldert was born in Rotterdam in 1912, the son of a baker. He studied at the Royal Academy in Rotterdam under Koos den Hartog, and in London under Harold Brownsword at Regent Street Polytechnic. In South Africa he studied at the Natal Technical College under Merlyn Evans and Nils Anderson, and under Eric Byrd at the Witwatersrand Technical College. His family moved to South Africa in 1935.

== Career ==
Johan Oldert worked initially as an illustrator and commercial artist in Johannesburg. Following an accident in which he fell down a lift-shaft in the building where he worked, he undertook a long convalescence, and subsequently decided to leave his employment and become an independent artist. Oldert was a popular and commercially very successful artist in the 1960s and 1970s. By the early 2000s Oldert's work had fallen from fashion; in 2009 Stephan Welz of Sotheby's described it as "calendar art", and suggested that Oldert's market had virtually disappeared.

== Works ==
A bronze bust of Ze'ev Jabotinsky by Oldert was presented to the Metzudat Ze'ev institute and museum in Tel Aviv in 2008 and remains on display.
