= Mikhail Stern =

Soviet sexologist and dissident

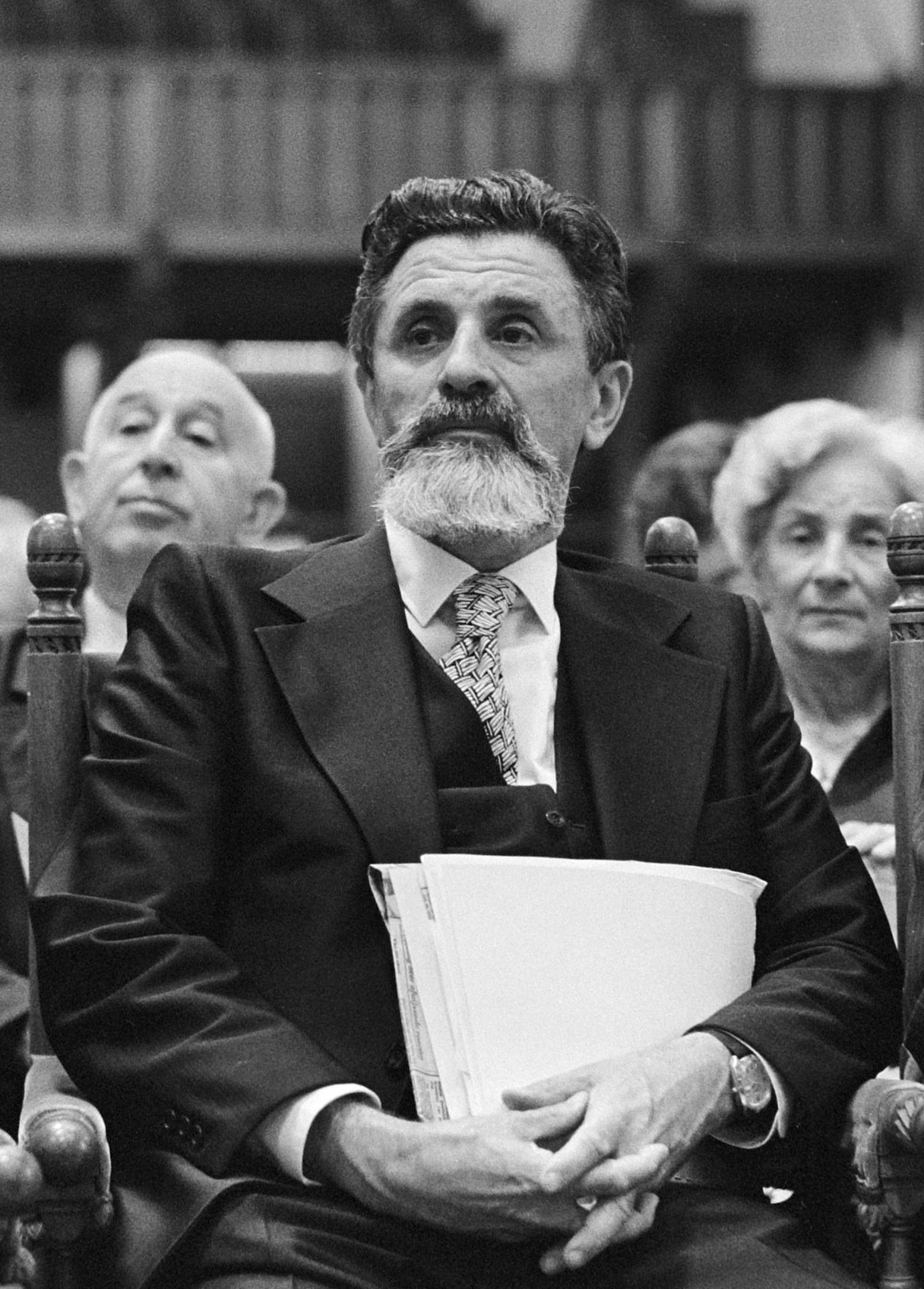
- Mikhail Stern at the Andrei Sakharov tribunal in The Hague in 1980
- Born: 1918; Zhmerynka, Ukraine
- Died: 17 June 2005 (aged 86–87); Amsterdam, the Netherlands
- Known for: Book Sex in the USSR

Mikhail Shaevich Stern (Russian: Михаил Шаевич Штерн, 1918 – 17 June 2005) was a Soviet endocrinologist, sexologist and dissident.

== Biography ==
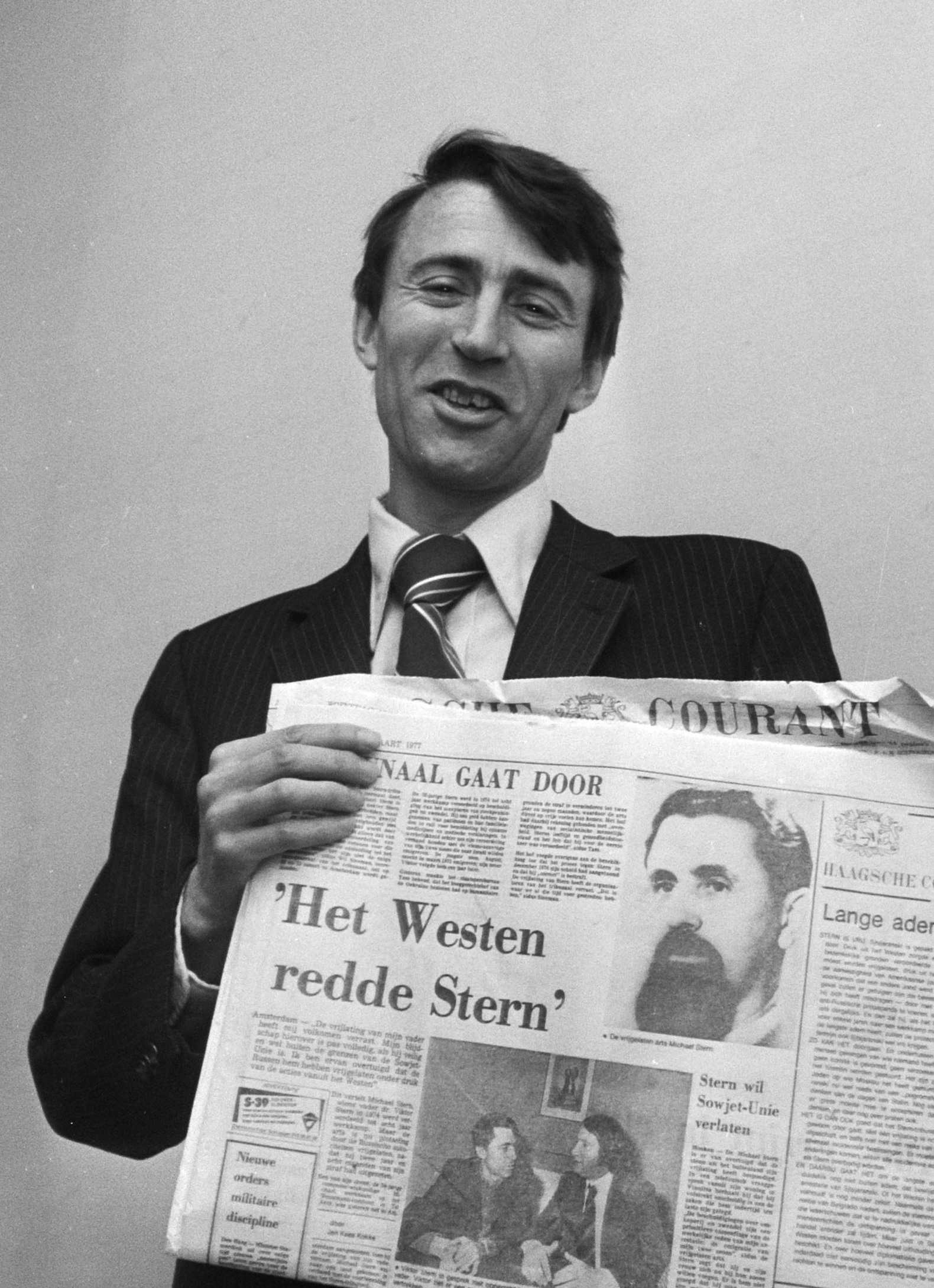
Viktor Stern in 1977, holding a Dutch newspaper Haagsche Courant with the article 'The West Saved Stern'

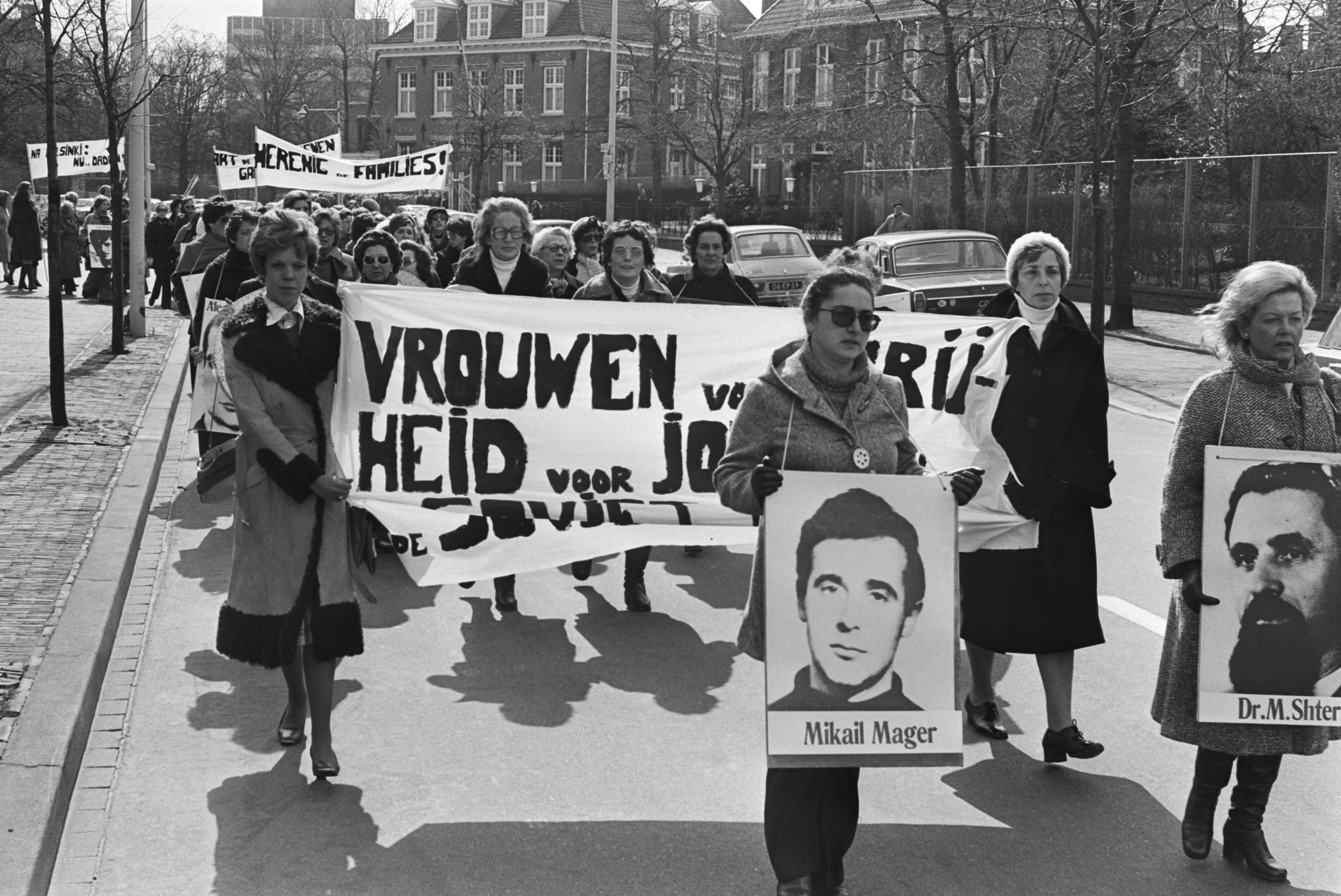
Women's demonstration in the Hague on 8 April 1976, demanding release of Stern, among other things

Stern was born in a Jewish family in a small Ukrainian town of Zhmerynka. In 1944 he received his doctor degree, and in 1947 organized in Chernovtsy the first endocrinological center in Ukraine. In 1952 he moved to Vinnitsa. The same year he was discharged because of the Doctors' plot, an imaginary conspiracy of Jewish doctors to poison Soviet leaders. He was reinstated in 1954, a year after Stalin's death. In 1963, Stern became a section head in a newly established endocrinological center in Vinnitsa.

In 1974, after his sons, Viktor (born 1941) and August (born 1945), applied for asylum in Israel, Stern was questioned at the Vinnitsa visa office and his flat was searched. Two weeks later he was arrested for swindling and bribery, and in December sentenced to eight years of hard labor in Kharkiv.

Meanwhile, his sons left the Soviet Union and campaigned for the release of their father. In 1976, August published a transcript of his father's trial, which was the first time the transcript of a dissident trial was leaked to the public. The transcript revealed various inconsistencies between witness accounts recorded behind closed doors and in the open trial, implying that the case was fabricated. The trial transcript was published in English translation by Urizen Books in 1978.

In 1977, an international tribunal was organized in Stern's defense in Amsterdam, which was attended by Simone de Beauvoir and Jean-Paul Sartre. Stern was released a week before the opening of the tribunal. He immigrated to Amsterdam, the Netherlands, where in 1979 he wrote a book describing taboos, sexual ignorance, and suppression of sexual freedoms in the Soviet Union. The book documents Stern's professional communications with patients. Stern's medical files were confiscated during his trial, and therefore the book is mostly written from memory, supported by photographs and personal letters.

Stern died in June, 2005 in Amsterdam from injuries sustained in an attack by burglars in his apartment two months earlier.

== In popular culture ==
In the Indian Hindi-language film Hum Aapke Hain Koun..! (1994), a comical domestic helper named Lallu Prasad (Laxmikant Berde) is briefly seen holding a copy of The USSR Versus Dr Mikhail Stern upside down and rambling from it.
