= Not one inch =

Israeli campaign slogan opposing land withdrawals

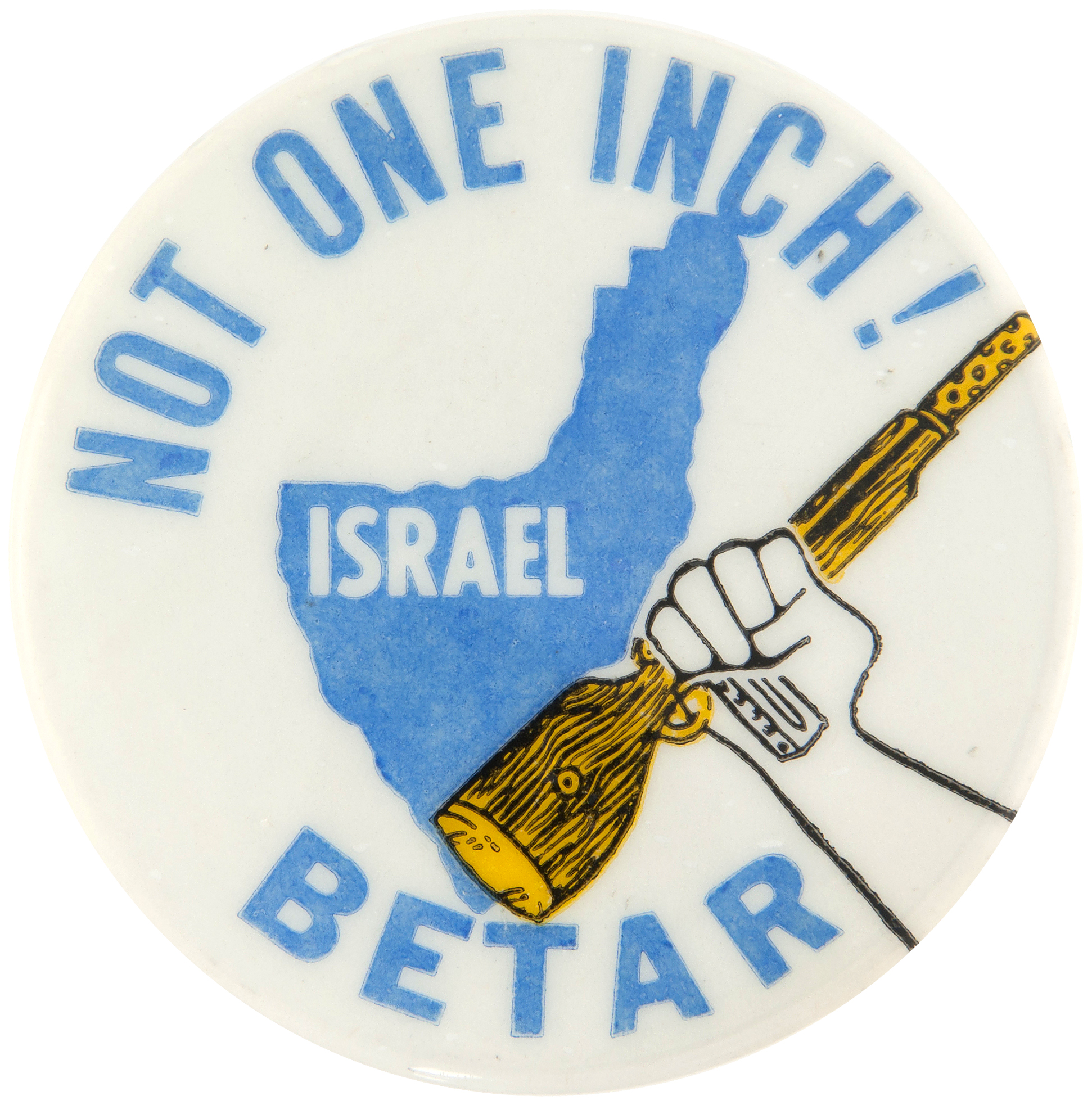
1977 Betar "Not One Inch" button

Not one inch was Israeli Prime Minister Menachem Begin's campaign pledge in 1977 to not cede an inch of territory without a peace agreement, which has seen periodic use since then.

== Origin ==
The phrase originated with Israeli Prime Minister Menachem Begin's campaign in 1977. The settlement movement embraced his campaign pledge not to cede an inch of territory without a peace agreement. The Israeli youth group Betar produced a pin-back button with the slogan "Not One Inch". After Begin won office, he returned the Sinai Peninsula to Egypt in the Camp David Accords.

Yitzhak Shamir became prime minister when Begin resigned, and continued the pledge with a different meaning: to not cede territory to any other governments as a part of any compromise. After losing the 1984 election, he formed a rotation government with Shimon Peres. The latter negotiated the Peres–Hussein London Agreement, which would have given much of the territory of the West Bank and Gaza Strip to Jordanian control. As part of the rotation deal, Shamir returned to the premiership in 1986, and rejected the agreement the next year.

== Later use ==
The phrase was revived in a 2004 Economist article entitled, "No, not an inch". The question at that time was whether then-prime minister Ariel Sharon should disengage from Gaza. Facing internal opposition, he quit the Likud party in 2005 over the "Not one inch" ideology, saying that it was impractical and harmful to Israel's interests. The election of Ehud Olmert as prime minister was seen as a rejection of the "not one inch" policy, as he was seen as the politician most likely to withdraw from the West Bank. The phrase returned in 2019 in relation to Israeli prime minister Benjamin Netanyahu. Roger Cohen, writing an op-ed for The New York Times, said: "He is a true believer in Greater Israel, and will not give up one inch of the land between the Mediterranean and the Jordan River."
