= Iron Wall (essay) =

1923 essay by Ze'ev Jabotinsky

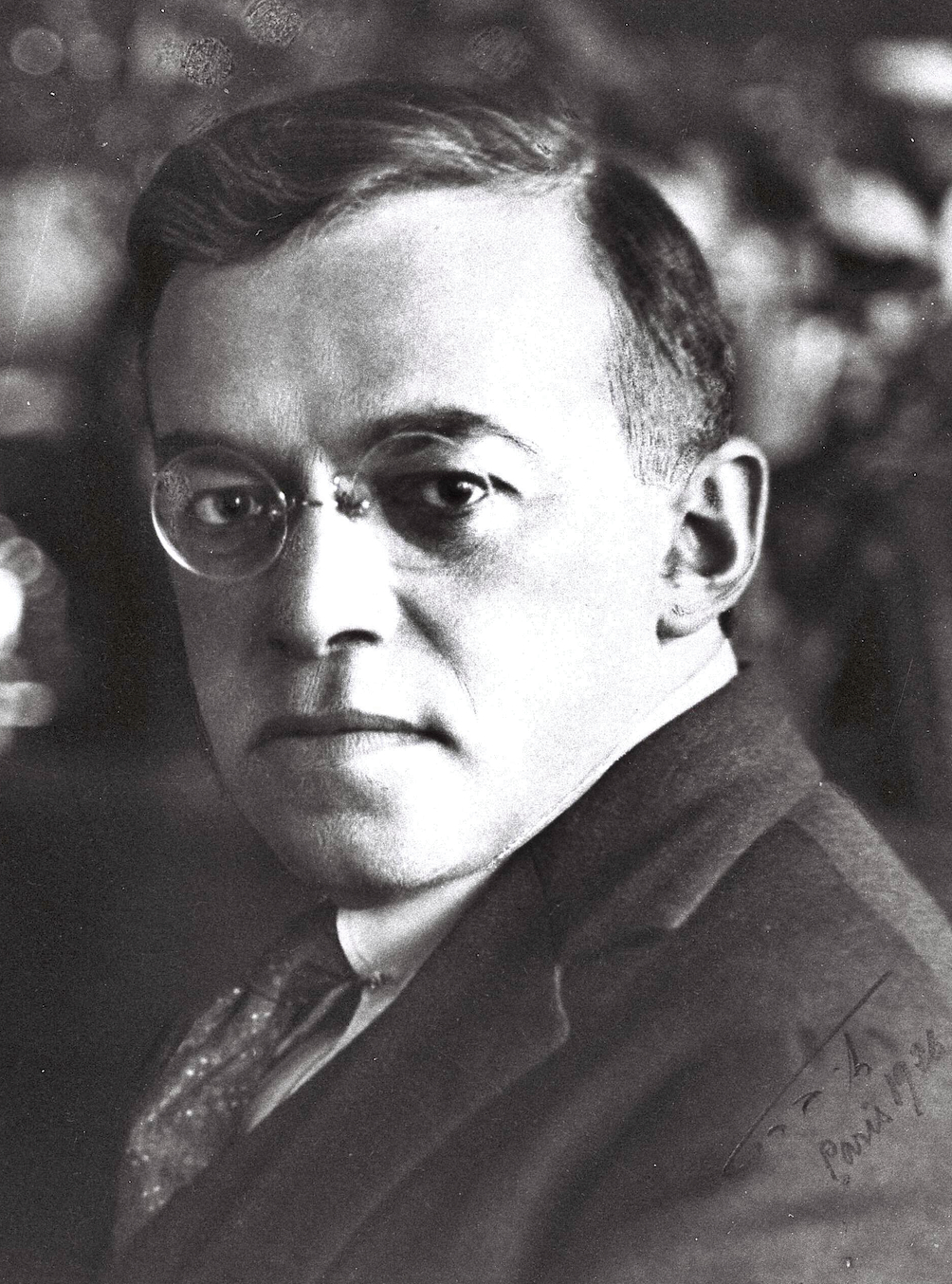
Zeev Jabotinsky

"About the Iron Wall" (Russian: О железной стене, romanized: O zheleznoy stene), often shortened to "The Iron Wall", is an essay written in 1923 by Ze'ev Jabotinsky. It was originally written in Russian and published by the Russian press.

Jabotinsky wrote the essay after British Colonial Secretary Winston Churchill prohibited Zionist settlement on the east bank of the Jordan River. Jabotinsky formed the Zionist Revisionism party after writing the essay.

Jabotinsky argued that the Palestinian Arabs would not agree to a Jewish majority in Palestine, and further noted that:

"Zionist colonisation must either stop, or else proceed regardless of the native population. Which means that it can proceed and develop only under the protection of a power that is independent of the native population – behind an iron wall, which the native population cannot breach."

The only solution to achieve peace and a Jewish state in the Land of Israel, Jabotinsky argued, would be for Jews to first establish a strong Jewish state, which would eventually prompt the Arabs leadership to become moderate, who would be more open to "mutual concessions."

A week after he published the essay, Jabotinsky followed with "The Ethics of the Iron Wall" in which he argued that morality comes before everything else and that Zionism is "moral and just" since it subscribes to "national self-determination" as a "sacred principle," which Arabs may also enjoy.

== Impact ==
The moderate Zionists criticised Ze'ev Jabotinsky's essay for the implications of the use of military force. However, they disagreed with the notion that the Zionist effort was a positive and just force, with Jabotinsky elaborating that for that very reason, resistance from those that attempt to stop it should be disregarded. Jabotinsky met with opposition also from the Zionist Labor Party, led by David Ben-Gurion. The party sought to reach statehood without military means but eventually recognised the use of military force in maintaining the state.

Though Jabotinsky's resolve to use military force to further the Zionist goals was frowned upon by both the moderate Zionists and the Zionists of the Labor Party, he would not let go of his conviction. His essay would go to form the fundamentals for the understanding of Revisionist Zionism. His ideas would work to influence the Revisionist Zionists but also the Zionist movement as a whole. In July 2023, Prime Minister Benyamin Netanyahu stated, "One hundred years after the 'iron wall' was stamped in Jabotinsky's writings we are continuing to successfully implement these principles".

== Analyses ==
=== Avi Shlaim's analysis ===
In Avi Shlaim's 2000 work, "The Iron Wall: Israel and the Arab World", he gives a brief overview of the background and history of Jabotinsky. In his work, Shlaim elaborates on Jabotinsky's Revisionist Zionist ideals. In his analysis of Jabotinsky's work, Shlaim noted Jabotinsky's argument that efforts to establish a Jewish state would require the assistance of Western European powers. Shlaim's analysis of The Iron Wall finds that Jabotinsky's followers considered the ideas put forth in the essay to be the basis for Revisionist Zionism.

However, Shlaim also concluded that the meaning behind the ideas devised by Jabotinsky was not fully understood, even by his followers. Shlaim stressed that Jabotinsky saw the "Iron Wall" not as an end to establishing a Jewish state but simply as a means to end Arab hostility towards the Zionist movement. Palestinian Arabs, according to Jabotinsky, would be privy to national rights in the newly-formed Jewish state. Shlaim notes that the nature of those rights is vague though political autonomy of Arab Palestinians is suggested. Shlaim emphasizes Jabotinsky's acknowledgement of the Palestinian Arab national identity in his essay and underlines Jabotinsky's belief that a military intervention is the only way to realise a Jewish state.
