= Ze'ev Jabotinsky =

Russian Revisionist Zionist leader (1880–1940)

Ze'ev Jabotinsky MBE
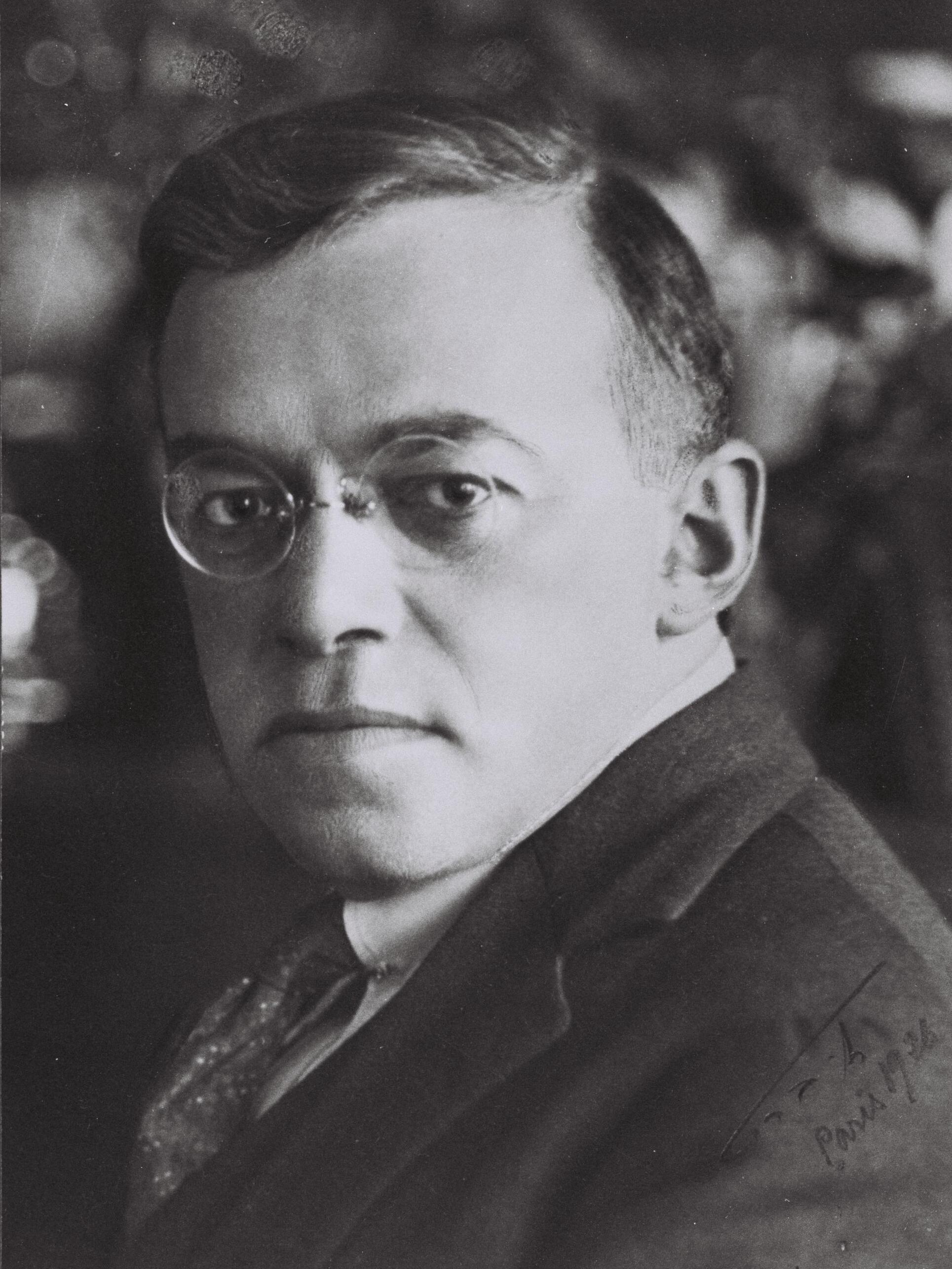
- Jabotinsky in 1926
- Born: Vladimir Yevgenyevich Zhabotinsky; 17 October 1880; Odessa, Russian Empire
- Died: 3 August 1940 (aged 59); Hunter, New York, U.S.
- Resting place: 1940–1964: New Montefiore Cemetery, New York, U.S.; 1964–present: Mt. Herzl, Jerusalem; 31°46′26″N 35°10′50″E
- Citizenship: Russian Empire
- Occupations: Zionist activist; military leader; author; journalist
- Years active: 1898–1940
- Known for: Revisionist Zionism
- Political party: Hatzohar, New Zionist Organization
- Spouse: Hanna Markovna Halpern (m. 1907–1940)
- Children: Eri Jabotinsky
- Awards: Member of the Order of the British Empire (1919)
- Military career
- Allegiance: United Kingdom
- Branch: British Army • Territorial Army
- Service years: 1915–1919
- Rank: Lieutenant
- Units: 20th Battalion, London Regiment; Jewish Legion
- Conflicts: World War I

Ze'ev Jabotinsky (Note: /ˌ(d)ʒæbəˈtɪnskiˌˌ(d)ʒɑːbə-/ ZHA(H)B-ə-TIN-skee-,-JA(H)B-) (Note: Hebrew: זְאֵב זַ׳בּוֹטִינְסְקִי, romanized: Ze'ev Zhabotinski; Yiddish: וואלף זשאַבאָטינסקי, romanized: Wolf Zhabotinski) MBE (born Vladimir Yevgenyevich Zhabotinsky; (Note: Russian: Владимир Евгеньевич Жаботинский.) 17 October 1880 – 3 August 1940) (Note: Most of the books say that Jabotinsky died on 4 August, because they wrongly convert the date from the Hebrew calendar. See details below.) was a Zionist leader, orator, writer, and soldier. He was the founder of the Revisionist Zionist movement and its associated organizations, including the Union of Revisionist Zionists (Hatzohar), New Zionist Organization, Betar youth movement, and paramilitary Irgun.

With Joseph Trumpeldor, he co-founded the Jewish Legion of the British Army in World War I.

== Early life ==
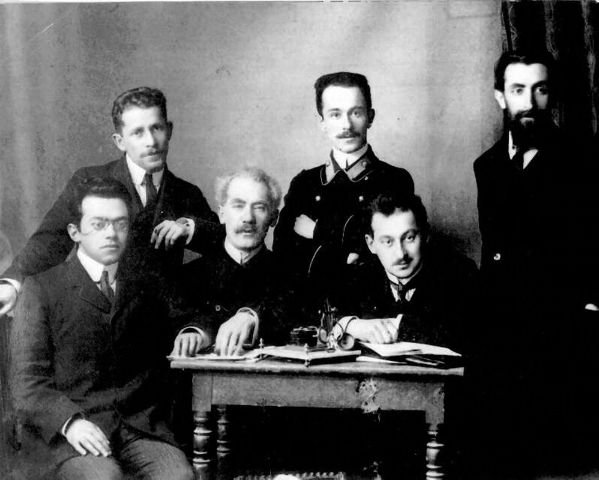
Editorial staff of Razsvet in Saint Petersburg, 1912. Sitting (R–L): 1) Max (Mordecai) Soloveichik (Solieli), 2) Avraham Ben David Idelson, 3) Zeev Jabotinsky; Standing: 1) Arnold Zeidman, 2) Alexander Goldstein, 3) Shlomo Gefstein

Vladimir Yevgenyevich (Yevnovich) Zhabotinsky was born in Odessa, Kherson Governorate (modern Ukraine) into an assimilated Jewish family. His father, Yevno (Yevgeniy Grigoryevich) Zhabotinsky, hailed from Nikopol, Yekaterinoslav Governorate. He was a member of the Russian Society of Sailing and Trade and was primarily involved in wheat trading. His mother, Chava (Eva Markovna) Zach (1835–1926), came from Berdychiv, Kiev Governorate. Jabotinsky's older brother Myron died when Vladimir was six months old, and his father died when he was six years old. His sister, Tereza (Tamara Yevgenyevna) Zhabotinskaya-Kopp, founded a private school for girls in Odessa. In 1885, the family moved to Germany due to his father's illness, returning a year later after his father's death.

Raised in a middle-class Jewish home, Jabotinsky was educated in Russian schools. Although he studied Hebrew as a child, he wrote in his autobiography that his upbringing was divorced from Jewish faith and tradition. His mother ran a stationery store in Odessa. Jabotinsky dropped out of school at the age of 17 with a guarantee of a job as a correspondent for a local Odessan newspaper, the Odesskiy Listok, and was sent to Bern and Rome as a correspondent. He also worked for the Odesskie Novosti after his return from Italy. Jabotinsky was a childhood friend of Russian journalist and poet Korney Chukovsky.

=== Studies in Rome and return to Odessa ===
From the autumn of 1898 onward, Jabotinsky was registered for three years as a law student at the Sapienza University of Rome, but hardly attended any classes and did not graduate, leading a bohemian lifestyle instead. In addition to Russian, Yiddish and Hebrew, he learned to speak fluent Italian.

After returning as a news reporter to Odessa, he was arrested in April 1902 for writing feuilletons in an anti-establishment tone, as well as contributing to a radical Italian journal. He was held isolated in a prison cell in the city for two months, where he communicated with other inmates through shouting and passing written notes.

In October 1907 Jabotinsky married Joanna (or Ania) Galperina.

== Early activism and militancy ==
=== Zionist activism in Russia ===
Prior to the Kishinev pogrom of 1903, Jabotinsky joined the Zionist movement, where he soon gained a reputation as a powerful speaker and an influential leader. With more pogroms looming on the horizon, he established the Jewish Self-Defense Organization, a Jewish militant group, to safeguard Jewish communities throughout Russia. He became a source of great controversy in the Russian Jewish community as a result of these actions.

Around this time, he began learning modern Hebrew, and took a Hebrew name: Vladimir became Ze'ev ("wolf"). During the pogroms, he organized self-defence units in Jewish communities across Russia and fought for the civil rights of the Jewish population as a whole. His slogan was, "Better to have a gun and not need it than to need it and not have it!" Another slogan was, "Jewish youth, learn to shoot!"

In 1903, he was elected as a Russian delegate to the Sixth Zionist Congress in Basel, Switzerland. After Theodor Herzl's death in 1904, he became the leader of the right-wing Zionists. That year he moved to Saint Petersburg and became one of the co-editors for the Russophone magazine Yevreiskaya Zhyzn (Jewish Life), which after 1907 became the official publishing body of the Zionist movement in Russia. In the pages of the newspaper, Jabotinsky wrote fierce polemics against supporters of assimilation and the Bund.

In 1905, he was one of the co-founders of the "Union for Rights Equality of Jewish People in Russia". The following year, he was one of the chief speakers at the 3rd All-Russian Conference of Zionists in Helsinki, Finland, which called upon the Jews of Europe to engage in Gegenwartsarbeit (work in the present) and to join together to demand autonomy for ethnic minorities in Russia. This liberal approach was later apparent in his position concerning the Arab citizens of the future Jewish State: Jabotinsky asserted that "Each one of the ethnic communities will be recognized as autonomous and equal in the eyes of the law."

In 1909, he fiercely criticized leading members of the Russian Jewish community for participating in ceremonies marking the centennial of the Russian writer Nikolai Gogol. In light of Gogol's antisemitic views, Jabotinsky claimed it was unseemly for Russian Jews to take part in these ceremonies, as it showed they had no Jewish self-respect.

=== Representative of the ZO in the Ottoman Empire, 1908–1914 ===
In 1909, Sultan Abdulhamid II was deposed. The year before that, following the Young Turk Revolution, the Berlin Executive office of the Zionist Organization (ZO), sent Jabotinsky to the Ottoman capital Constantinople where he became editor-in-chief of a new pro-Young-Turkish daily newspaper Le Jeune Turc (meaning Young Turk) which was founded and financed by Zionist officials like ZO president David Wolffsohn and his representative in Constantinople Victor Jacobson. The journalists writing for that paper included the famous German Social democrat and Russian-Jewish revolutionary Alexander Parvus, who lived in Constantinople from 1910 until 1914. The Jeune Turc was prohibited in 1915 by the pro-German CUP dictatorship. Richard Lichtheim, who was to become Jabotinsky's representative in Germany in 1925, stayed in Constantinople as ZO representative and managed to keep the "Yishuv" (Jewish population of Palestine) out of trouble during the war years by constant diplomatic interventions with German, Turkish, and also American authorities, whose humanitarian support was crucial for the survival of the Jewish settlement project in Palestine during the war years.

== World War I military career ==
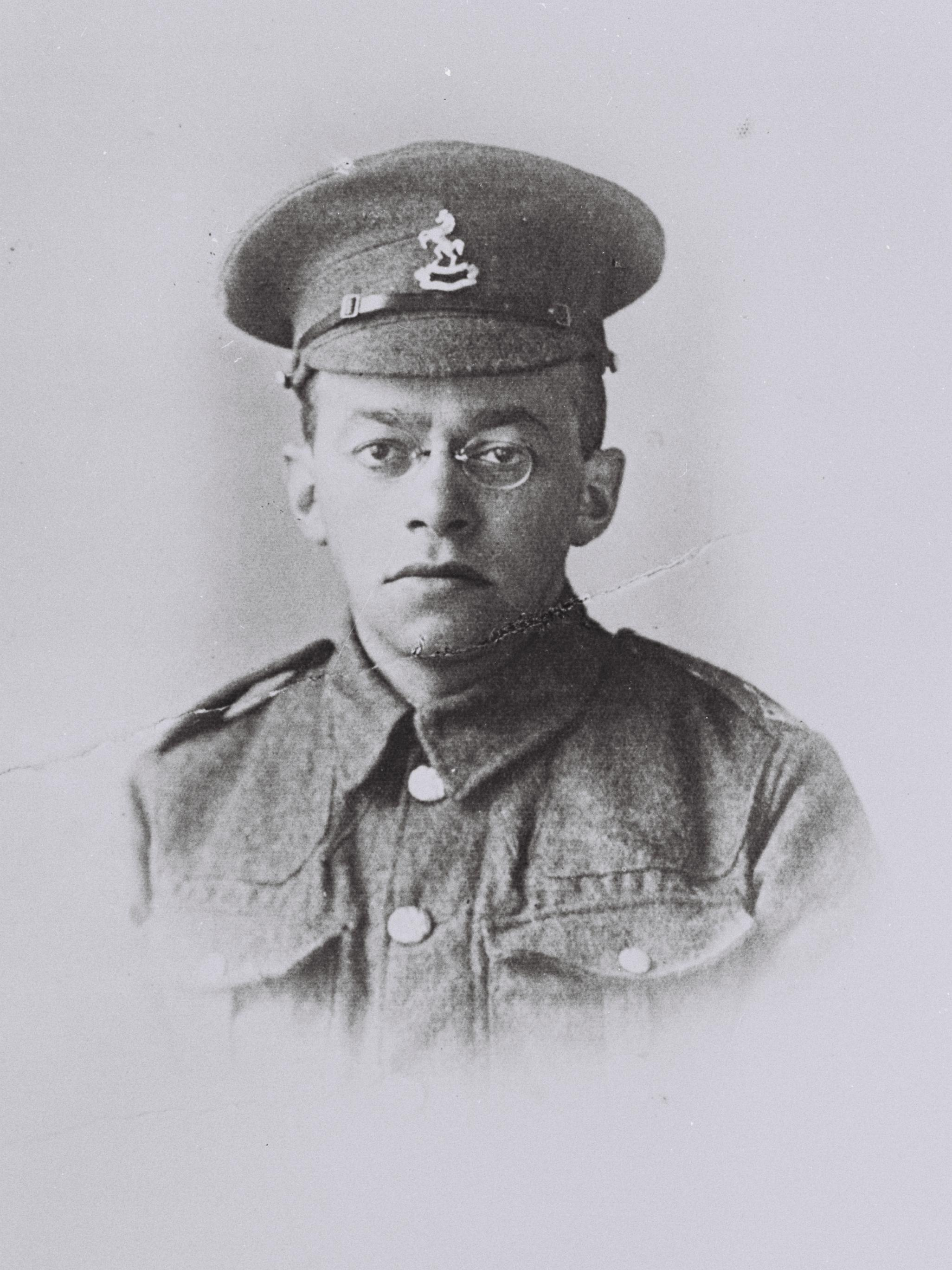
Ze'ev Jabotinsky served in platoon 16 of the 20th Battalion of the London Regiment between 1916 and 1917

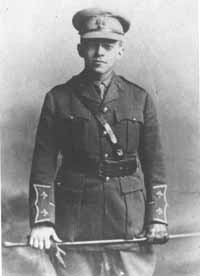
Lt Jabotinsky in the uniform of the Royal Fusiliers

During World War I, he had the idea of establishing a Jewish Legion to fight alongside the British against the Ottomans who then controlled Palestine. In 1915, together with Joseph Trumpeldor, a one-armed veteran of the Russo-Japanese War, he created the Zion Mule Corps, which consisted of several hundred Jewish men, mainly Russians who had been exiled from Palestine by the Ottoman Empire and had settled in Egypt. The unit served with distinction in the Battle of Gallipoli. When the Zion Mule Corps was disbanded, Jabotinsky traveled to London, where he continued his efforts to establish Jewish units to fight in Palestine as part of the British Army. Although Jabotinsky did not serve with the Zion Mule Corps, Trumpeldor, Jabotinsky and 120 Zion Mule Corps members did serve in Platoon 16 of the 20th Battalion of the London Regiment. In 1917, the government agreed to establish three Jewish battalions, initiating the Jewish Legion.

As an honorary lieutenant in the 38th Royal Fusiliers, Jabotinsky saw action in Palestine in 1918. His battalion was one of the first to enter Transjordan.

He was demobilised in September 1919, soon after he complained to Field Marshal Allenby about the British Army's attitude towards Zionism and the reduction of the Jewish Legion to just one battalion. His appeals to the British government failed to reverse the decision, but in December 1919 he was appointed a Member of the Order of the British Empire (MBE) for his service.

== Renewed activism and militancy ==
=== Jewish self-defense and 1920 Palestine riots ===
After Ze'ev Jabotinsky was discharged from the British Army in September 1919, he openly trained Jews in warfare and the use of small arms. On 6 April 1920, during the 1920 Palestine riots the British searched the offices and apartments of the Zionist leadership for arms, including the home of Chaim Weizmann, and in a building used by Jabotinsky's defense forces they found three rifles, two pistols, and 250 rounds of ammunition.

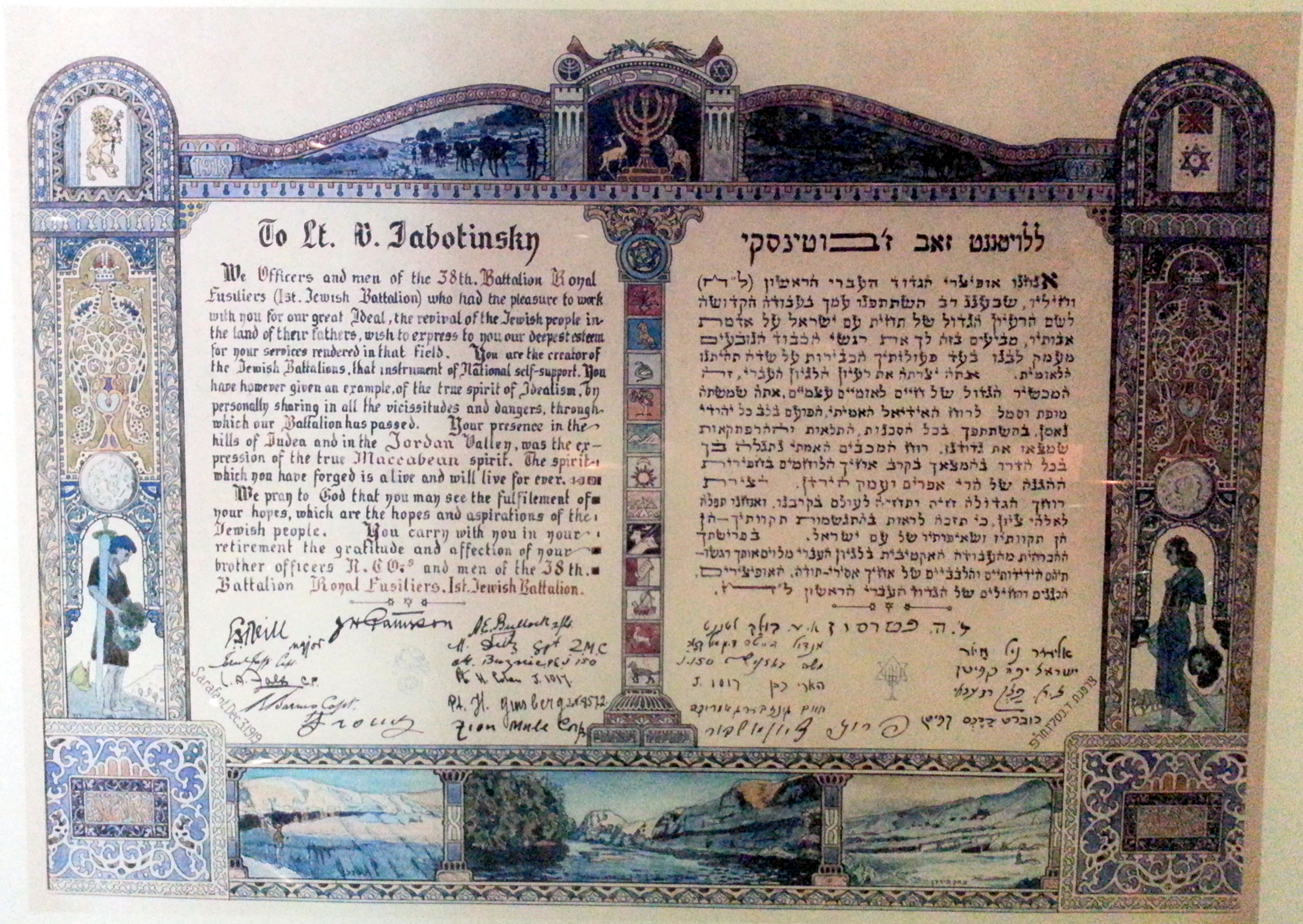
Testimonial to Jabotinsky from the 38th Battalion, Royal Fusiliers

Nineteen men were arrested. The next day Jabotinsky protested to the police that he was their commander and therefore solely responsible, so they should be released. Instead, he, too, was arrested, and the nineteen were sentenced to three years in prison with Jabotinsky being given a 15-year prison term for possession of weapons, until a July 1920 general pardon was granted to both Jews and Arabs convicted in the rioting.

A committee of inquiry placed responsibility for the riots on the Zionist Commission, alleging that they provoked the Arabs. The court blamed "Bolshevism" claiming that it "flowed in Zionism's inner heart", and ironically identified the fiercely anti-socialist Jabotinsky with the socialist-aligned Poalei Zion ('Zionist Workers') party, which it called 'a definite Bolshevist institution.'

=== Founder of the Revisionist movement ===
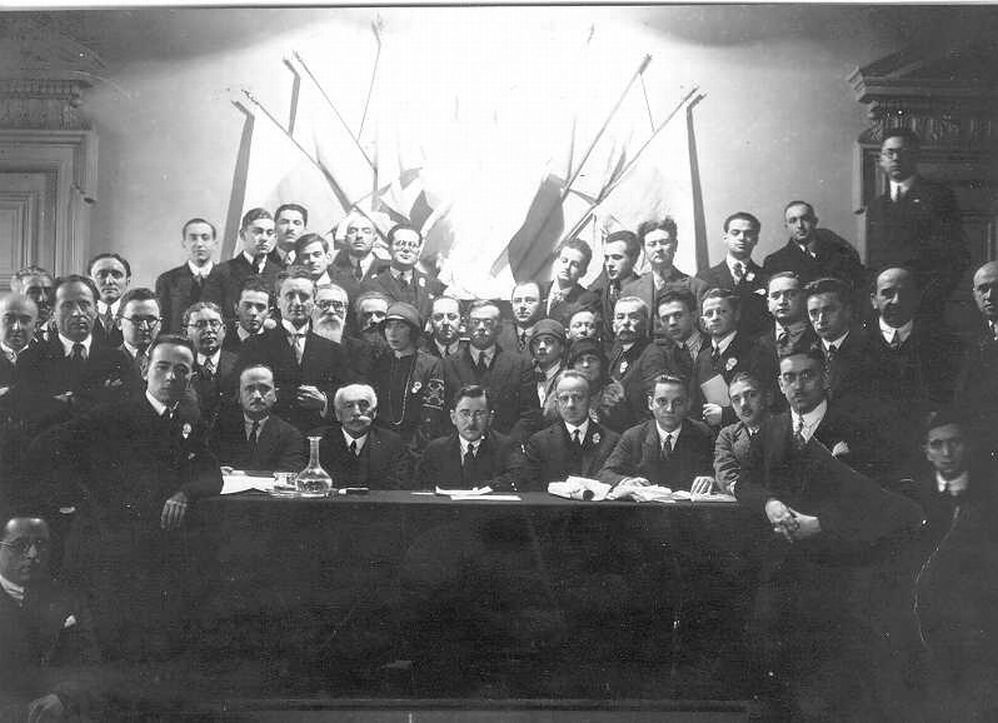
Ze'ev Jabotinsky (second row in the very center, wearing glasses) at a Hatzohar Conference (likely in Paris, in the second half of the 1920s)

In 1920, Jabotinsky was elected to the first Assembly of Representatives in Palestine. The following year he was elected to the executive council of the Zionist Organization. He was also a founder of the newly registered Keren haYesod and served as its director of propaganda.

On September 4, 1921, during the 12th Zionist Congress in Karlsbad, signed a controversial agreement with Maksym Slavinsky, the diplomatic representative of the Ukrainian People’s Republic in Czechoslovakia, which provided for the formation of armed Jewish self-defense units to be integrated into the Ukrainian anti-Bolshevik forces led by Symon Petliura, in part to protect Jewish communities from pogroms. This proposal allowed Petliura to claim that he was not an anti-Semite and that the pogroms were merely “unfortunate” incidents that had occurred in the heat of battle. The plan was never implemented, as the planned Ukrainian military offensive against the Bolsheviks did not materialize.

Jabotinsky left the mainstream Zionist movement in 1923 due to differences of opinion between him and its chairman, Chaim Weizmann, establishing a new revisionist party called Alliance of Revisionists-Zionists and its Zionist youth paramilitary organization Betar.

His new party demanded that the mainstream Zionist movement recognize as its stated objective the establishment of a Jewish state on both banks of the Jordan River. His main goal was to establish, with the help of the British Empire, a modern Jewish state in which equality of rights for its Arab minority were upheld. He maintained, however, that this could only be achieved through force, and condemned the "vegetarians" and "peace mongers" in mainstream Zionism who believed that this could be achieved peacefully.

His philosophy contrasted with that of the socialist-oriented Labor Zionists, in that it focused its economic and social policy on the ideals of the Jewish middle class in Europe. His ideal for a Jewish state was a form of nation state based loosely on the British imperial model. His support base was mostly located in Poland, and his activities focused on attaining British support to help with the development of the Yishuv. Another area of major support for Jabotinsky was Latvia, where his speeches in Russian made an impression on the largely Russian-speaking Latvian Jewish community.

Jabotinsky was both a nationalist and a liberal democrat. He rejected authoritarian notions of state authority and its imposition on individual liberty; he said that "Every man is a king." He championed the notion of a free press and believed the new Jewish state would protect the rights and interests of minorities. As an economic liberal, he supported a free market with minimal government intervention, but also believed that the "'elementary necessities' of the average person...: food, shelter, clothing, the opportunity to educate his children, and medical aid in case of illness" should be supplied by the state.

Italy and Mussolini were a source of ideological, historical and cultural inspiration for the Zionist Revisionists of the 1920s and 1930s. From the early 1930s onwards, Jabotinsky believed that the United Kingdom could no longer be trusted to advance the Zionist cause and that Italy, as a growing power capable of challenging Britain for dominance in the region, was a natural ally. Jabotinsky set up the Betar Naval Academy, a Zionist naval training school established in Civitavecchia, Italy in 1934 with the agreement of Benito Mussolini.

In 1930, while he was visiting South Africa, he was informed by the British Colonial Office that he would not be allowed to return to Palestine.

=== 1930s evacuation plan ===
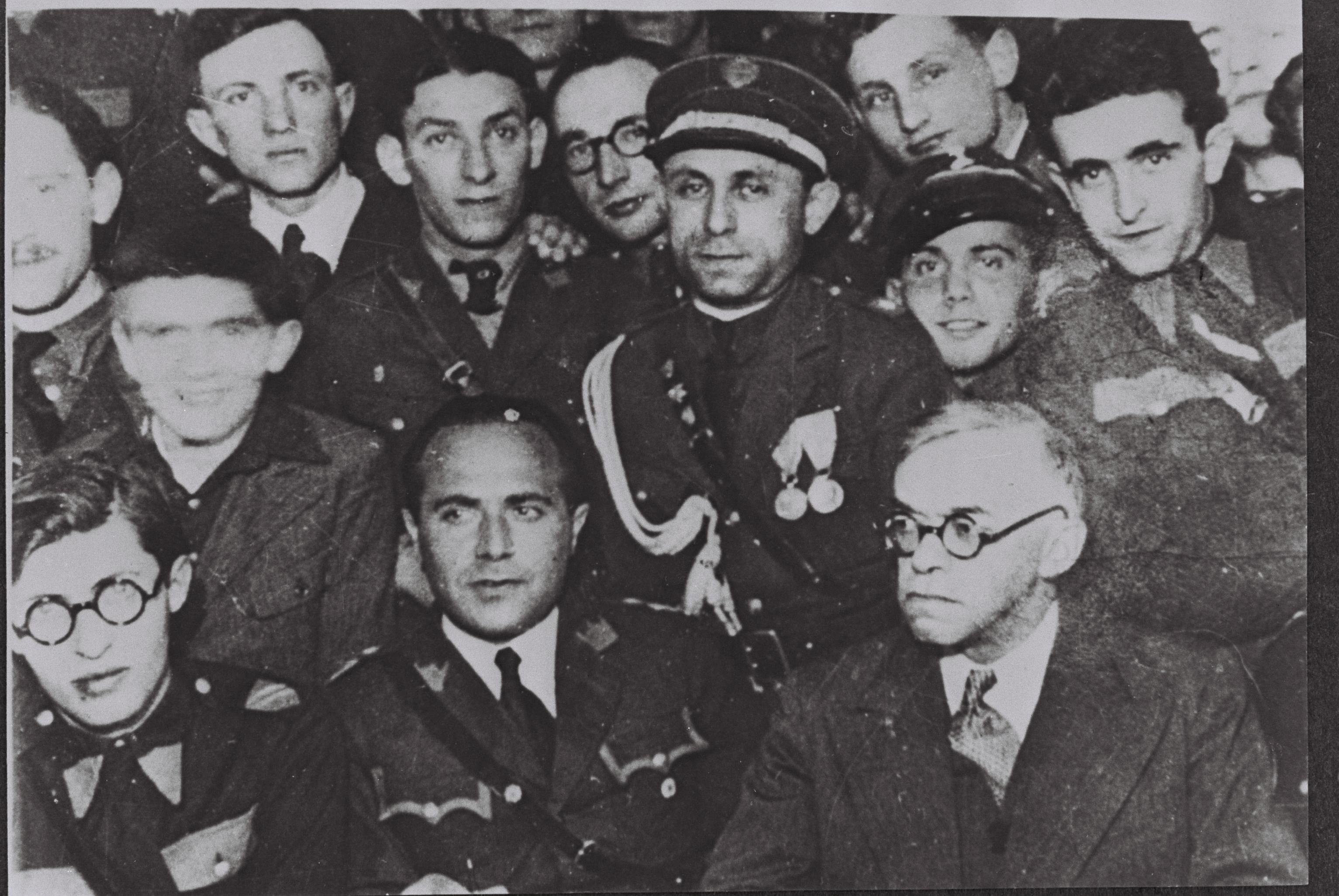
Ze'ev Jabotinsky (bottom right) meeting with Betar leaders in Warsaw. Bottom left Menachem Begin (probably 1939).

During the 1930s, Jabotinsky was deeply concerned with the situation of the Jewish community in Eastern Europe. In 1936, Jabotinsky prepared the so-called "evacuation plan", which called for the evacuation of 1.5 million Jews from Poland, the Baltic States, Nazi Germany, Hungary and Romania to Mandatory Palestine over the span of the next ten years. The plan was first proposed on 8 September 1936 in the conservative Polish newspaper Czas, the day after Jabotinsky organized a conference where more details of the plan were laid out; the emigration would take 10 years and would include 750,000 Jews from Poland, with 75,000 between age of 20–39 leaving the country each year. Jabotinsky stated that his goal was to reduce Jewish population in the countries involved, to levels that would make them disinterested in its further reduction.

The same year he toured Eastern Europe, meeting with the Polish Foreign Minister, Colonel Józef Beck; the Regent of Hungary, Admiral Miklós Horthy; and Prime Minister Gheorghe Tătărescu of Romania to discuss the evacuation plan. The plan gained the approval of all three governments but caused considerable controversy within the Jewish community of Poland, on the grounds that it played into the hands of antisemites. In particular, the fact that the 'evacuation plan' had the approval of the Polish government was taken by many Polish Jews as indicating Jabotinsky had gained the endorsement of what they considered to be the wrong people.

The evacuation of Jewish communities in Poland, Hungary and Romania was to take place over a ten-year period. However, the British government vetoed it, and the Zionist Organization's chairman, Chaim Weizmann, dismissed it. Chaim Weizmann suggested that Jabotinsky was willing to accept Madagascar as one destination for limited emigration for Jews, due to political issues involved with settlement in Palestine, and dispatches from Warsaw by British ambassador Hugh Kennard, corroborate Weizmann's account. Two years later, in 1938, Jabotinsky allegedly stated in a speech that Polish Jews were "living on the edge of the volcano" and warned that the situation in Poland could drastically worsen sometime in the near future. "Catastrophe is approaching. ... I see a terrible picture ... the volcano that will soon spew out its flames of extermination," he said. Jabotinsky went on to warn Jews in Europe that they should leave for Palestine as soon as possible. There is much discussion about whether or not Jabotinsky actually predicted the Holocaust. In his writings and public appearances, he warned against the dangers of an outbreak of violence against the Jewish population of Central and Eastern Europe. However, as late as August 1939, he was certain that war would be averted. The General Jewish Labour Bund ridiculed Jabotinsky and his warnings calling him a "Purim General."

A study published in 2023 by Goldstein and Huri concluded that Jabotinsky never made the 1938 speech attributed to him. Although Jabotinsky gave a speech on that day, the text was different. The earliest mention of the alleged prophetic content that Goldstein and Huri could locate was published in 1958 by the same associate of Jabotinsky who had published the original text in 1938, possibly to bolster the campaign to relocate Jabotinsky's remains to Israel.

On the anniversary of Tisha B'Av (August 1938), Jabotinsky said:

It is already three years that I am calling upon you, Polish Jewry, who are the crown of world Jewry. I continue to warn you incessantly that a catastrophe is coming closer. I became grey and old in these years. My heart bleeds, that you, dear brothers and sisters, do not see the volcano which will soon begin to spit its all-consuming lava. I see that you are not seeing this because you are immersed and sunk in your daily worries. Today, however, I demand from you trust. You were convinced already that my prognoses have already proven to be right. If you think differently, then drive me out of your midst! However, if you do believe me, then listen to me in this 12th hour:In the name of God! Let anyone of you save himself as long as there is still time. And time there is very little…and what else I would like to say to you in this day of Tisha B’Av: whoever of you will escape from the catastrophe, he or she will live to see the exalted moment of a great Jewish wedding: the rebirth and the rise of a Jewish state. I don’t know if I will be privileged to see it; my son will! I believe in this as I am sure that tomorrow morning the sun will rise.

=== 1939 plan for a revolt against the British ===
In 1939, Britain enacted the MacDonald White Paper, in which Jewish immigration to Palestine under the British Mandate was to be restricted to 75,000 for the next five years, after which further Jewish immigration would depend on Arab consent. In addition, land sales to Jews were to be restricted, and Palestine would be cultivated for independence as a binational state.

Jabotinsky reacted by proposing a plan for an armed Jewish revolt in Palestine. He sent the plan to the Irgun High Command in six coded letters. Jabotinsky proposed that he and other "illegals" would arrive by boat in the heart of Palestine – preferably Tel Aviv – in October 1939. The Irgun would ensure that they successfully landed and escaped, by whatever means necessary. They would then occupy key centers of British power in Palestine, chief among them Government House in Jerusalem, raise the Jewish national flag, and fend off the British for at least 24 hours whatever the cost. Zionist leaders in Western Europe and the United States would then declare an independent Jewish state and would function as a provisional government-in-exile. Although Irgun commanders were impressed by the plan, they were concerned over the heavy losses they would doubtless incur in carrying it out. Avraham Stern proposed simultaneously landing 40,000 armed young immigrants in Palestine to help launch the uprising. The Polish government supported his plan, and it began training Irgun members and supplying them arms for 10,000 men for a proposed invasion of Palestine in April 1940. The Irgun submitted the plan for the approval of its commander David Raziel, who was imprisoned by the British. However, the beginning of World War II in September 1939 quickly put an end to these plans.

On 12 May 1940, Jabotinsky offered Winston Churchill the support of a 130,000-strong Jewish volunteer corps to fight the Nazis; he also proposed to Weizmann and David Ben-Gurion the creation of a united front for policy and relief.

== Literary career ==
In 1898, Jabotinsky was sent to Rome as a correspondent for Odessky Listok, writing columns under the pen name "V. Egal, "Vl. Egal" "V.E." for more than a year. His first application for a job at Odesskiya Novosti was turned down, but after the editor, J.M. Heifetz, saw his writing for Odessky Listok, he hired him. At that point, Jabotinsky changed his pen name to Altalena, which he confesses was a mistake. He thought the Italian word meant "elevator," but explained to the editor that the real meaning, "swing," suited him well, since he was "'by no means stable or constant', but rather rocking and balancing."

In 1914, Jabotinsky published the first Hebrew translation of Edgar Allan Poe's poems The Raven and Annabel Lee.

From 1923, Jabotinsky was editor of the revived Jewish weekly Rassvet (Dawn), published first in Berlin, then in Paris. Besides his journalistic work, he published novels under his previous pseudonym Altalena; his historical novel Samson Nazorei (Samson the Nazirite, 1927), set in Biblical times, describes Jabotinsky's ideal of an active, daring, warrior form of Jewish life. His novel Pyatero (The Five, written 1935, published 1936 in Paris) has been described as "a work that probably has the truest claim to being the great Odessa novel. ... It contains poetic descriptions of early-twentieth-century Odessa, with nostalgia-tinged portraits of its streets and smells, its characters and passions." Although it was little noticed at the time, it has received renewed appreciation for its literary qualities at the start of the twenty-first century, being reprinted in Russia and Ukraine and in 2005 translated into English (the first translation into a Western language).

== Family ==
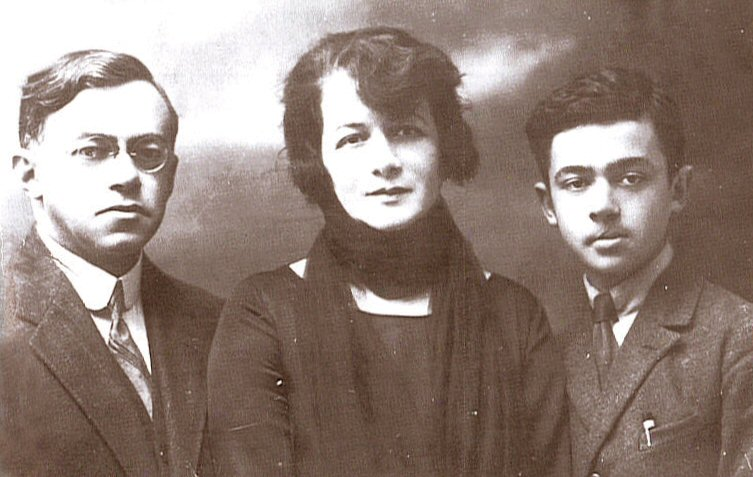
Jabotinsky with his wife and son

While in Odessa, Jabotinsky married Joanna (or Ania) Galperina (1884–1949) in October 1907. They had one child, Eri Jabotinsky (1910–1969), who later became a member of the Irgun-affiliated Bergson Group. Eri Jabotinsky briefly served in the 1st Knesset of Israel; he died on 6 June 1969 aged 58 – one year younger than his father had been when he died at the age of 59.

== Death and burial ==
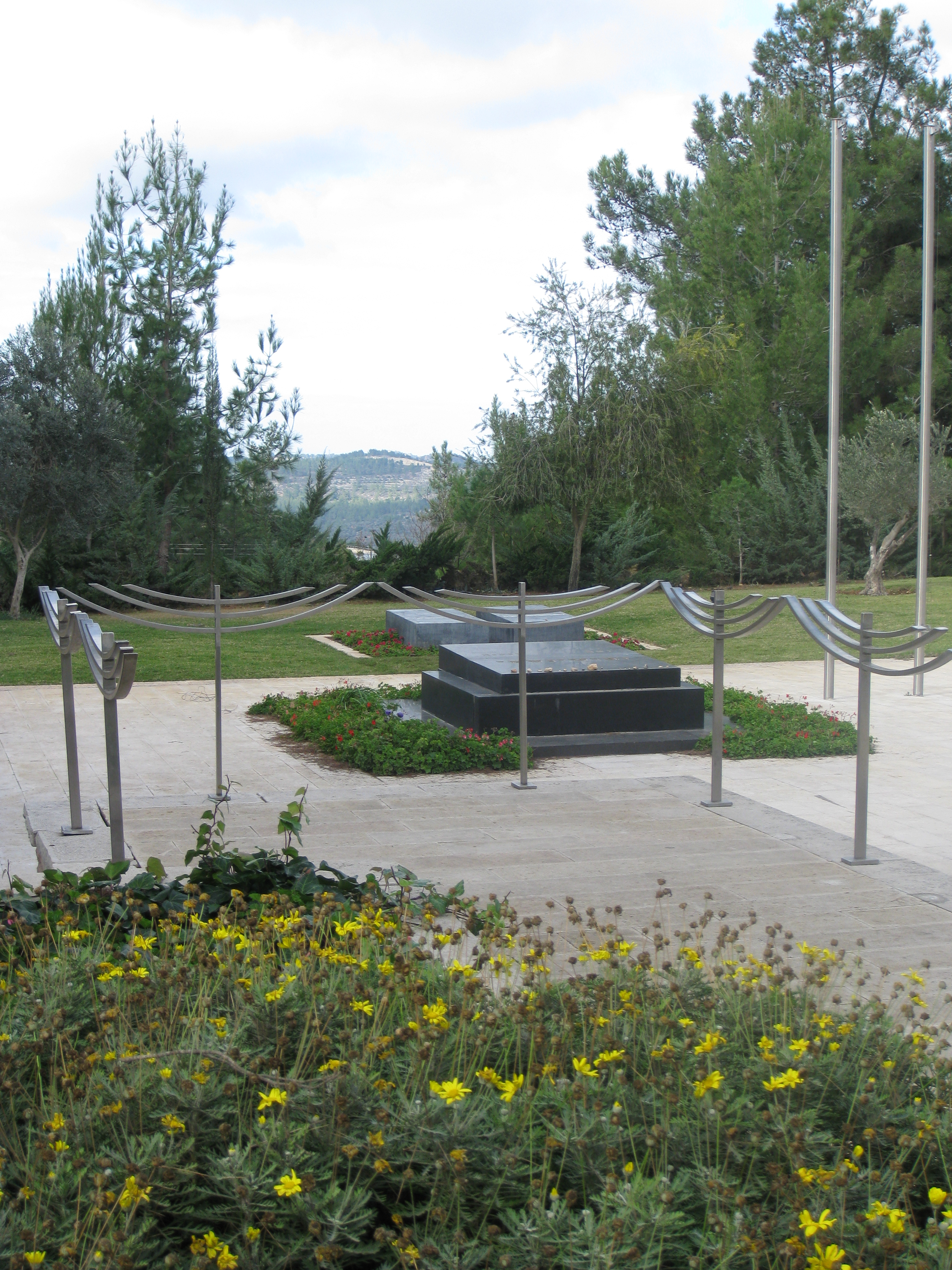
Grave of Jabotinsky, Mount Herzl, Jerusalem

Jabotinsky died of a heart attack shortly before midnight on 3 August 1940, while he was visiting a Jewish self-defense camp run by Betar in Hunter, New York.

Jabotinsky was buried in New Montefiore Cemetery in Farmingdale, New York, in accordance with a clause of his will. Ben-Gurion refused to allow Jabotinsky to be reburied in Israel. By order of Israeli Prime Minister Levi Eshkol and in accordance with a second clause of his will, the remains of Jabotinsky and his wife were reburied at Mount Herzl Cemetery in Jerusalem in 1964. A monument to Jabotinsky was erected at his original burial site in New York.

== Views and opinions ==
According to Israeli historian Benny Morris, documents show that Jabotinsky favored the idea of the transfer of Arab populations out of the proposed state if required for its establishment. Jabotinsky's other writings state, "we do not want to eject even one Arab from either the left or the right bank of the Jordan River. We want them to prosper both economically and culturally. We envision the regime of Jewish Palestine [Eretz Israel ha-Ivri, or the 'Jewish Land of Israel'] as follows: most of the population will be Jewish, but equal rights for all Arab citizens will not only be guaranteed, they will also be fulfilled."

In 1927, he reacted angrily to a published report that he had called for the expulsion of Arabs from Palestine. In a letter to the Zionist newspaper Haolam, he wrote: "I never said that, or anything that could be interpreted in this sense. My position is, on the contrary, that no one will expel from the Land of Israel its Arab inhabitants, either all or a portion of them – this is, first of all, immoral, and secondly, impossible."

Jabotinsky was convinced that there was no way for the Jews to regain any part of Palestine without opposition from the Arabs. In 1934, he wrote a draft constitution for the Jewish state which declared that Arabs would be on an equal footing with their Jewish counterparts "throughout all sectors of the country's public life." The two communities would share the state's duties, both military and civil service, and enjoy its prerogatives. Jabotinsky proposed that Hebrew and Arabic should enjoy equal status, and that "in every cabinet where the prime minister is a Jew, the vice-premiership shall be offered to an Arab and vice versa."

Jabotinsky viewed Zionism as a complete cultural departure from the Jewish way of life in Europe and saw the new "Hebrew" as a radical redefinition of the Jewish culture and values at the time. In 1905 he wrote:

To imagine what a true Hebrew is, to picture his image in our minds, we have no example from which to draw. Instead, we must use the method of ipcha mistavra (Aramaic for deriving something from its opposite): We take as our starting point the Yid (used here as pejorative for Jew) of today, and try to imagine in our minds his exact opposite. Let us erase from that picture all the personality traits that are so typical of a Yid, and let us insert into it all the desirable traits whose absence is so typical in him. Because the Yid is ugly, sickly, and lacks handsomeness (הדרת פנים) we shall endow the ideal image of the Hebrew with masculine beauty, stature, massive shoulders, vigorous movements, bright colors, and shades of color. The Yid is frightened and downtrodden; the Hebrew ought to be proud and independent. The Yid is disgusting to all; the Hebrew should charm all. The Yid has accepted submission; the Hebrew ought to know how to command. The Yid likes to hide with bated breath from the eyes of strangers; the Hebrew, with brazenness and greatness, should march ahead to the entire world, look them straight and deep in their eyes and hoist them his banner: “I am a Hebrew!”

His views were adopted by some Zionist publications, including Cahiers du Bétar, a monthly in Tunisia.

== Legacy ==
In his study of the formative leaders of the Zionist movement and the State of Israel, Zeev Tzahor describes Jabotinsky as "a dazzling intellectual, an exceptional writer and a brilliant statesman...A charming man fluent in many languages, sensitive to cultural nuances, and profoundly knowledgeable in a broad array of subjects." However, despite this profusion of talents, he never became leader of the Zionist movement.

== Commemoration ==
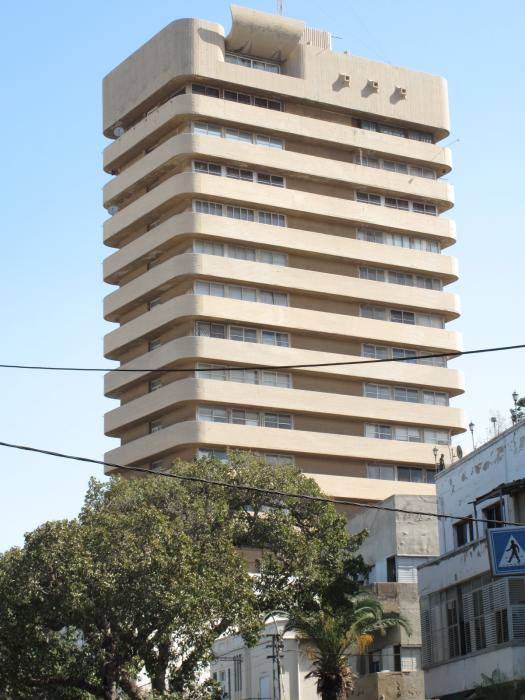
Jabotinsky House at King George V St. in Tel Aviv. The building is also known as "Ze'ev's Stronghold" and is named after Ze'ev Jabotinsky. It used to be the center of the Herut Party and is now the central institute of the Likud Party.

- In Israel, 57 streets, parks and squares are named after Jabotinsky, more than for any other person in Jewish or Israeli history, making him the most-commemorated historical figure in Israel. In 2022 the Murom Street in Ukraine's capital of Kyiv was renamed to the Ukrainian version of Jabotinsky's name Volodymyr Zhabotinsky Street.

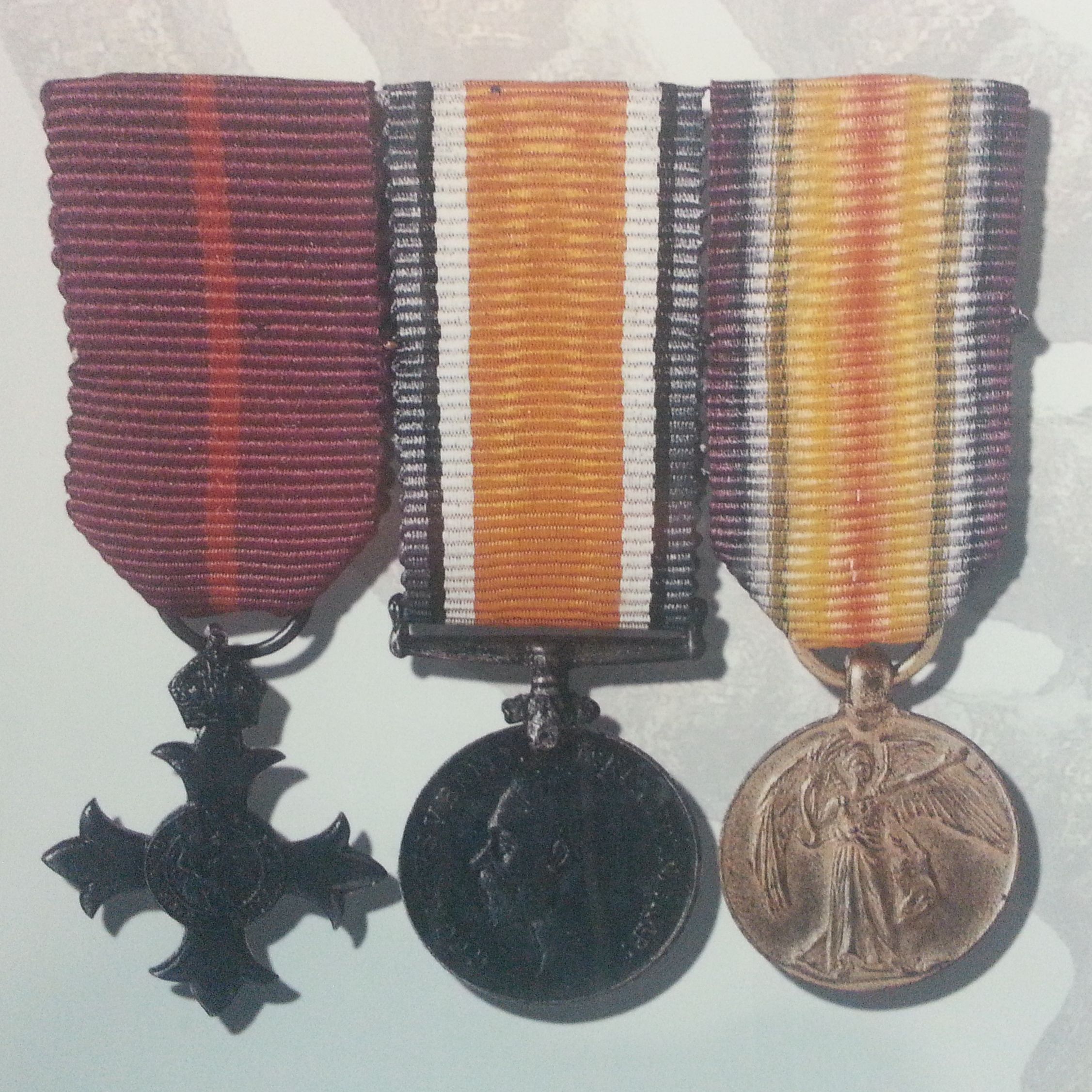
Miniatures of the MBE, British War Medal and Victory Medal awarded to Jabotinsky

- The Jabotinsky Medal is awarded for outstanding achievements in the sphere of literature and research.
- The Jabotinsky Institute, in Tel Aviv, is a repository of documents and research relating to the history of Betar, the Revisionist movement, the Irgun, and Herut. It is identified with Likud.
- A bronze bust of Jabotinsky by Johan Oldert was presented to the Metzudat Ze'ev in Tel Aviv in 2008 and remains on display.

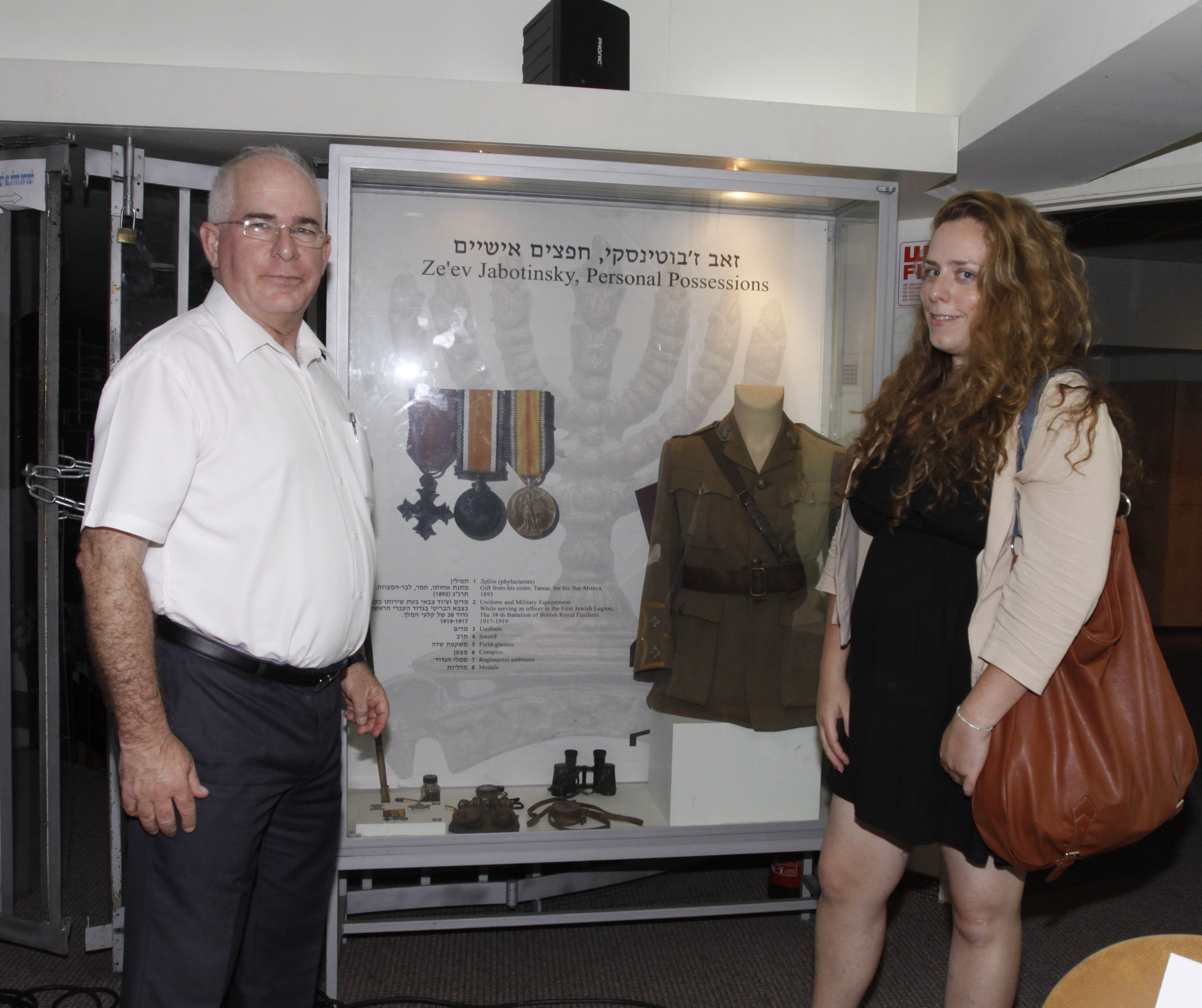
Jabotinsky's grandson Ze'ev with his daughter Tal beside Jabotinsky's uniforms and military decorations at the Jabotinsky Institute and Museum

- A mural of a young Jabotinsky was unveiled in his birthplace of Odesa on the house where he was born in April 2021. It was unveiled by mayor of Odesa Hennadii Trukhanov and Israeli ambassador to Ukraine Joel Lion.
- Jabotinsky Day (Hebrew: יום ז'בוטינסקי) is an Israeli national holiday celebrated annually on the twenty ninth of the Hebrew month of Tammuz, to commemorate the life and vision of Zionist leader Ze'ev Jabotinsky.

== Published works ==
- Turkey and the War, London, T.F. Unwin, Ltd. [1917]
- Samson the Nazarite, London, M. Secker, [1930]
- The Jewish War Front, London, T.F. Unwin, Ltd. [1940]
- The War and The Jew, New York, The Dial Press [c1942]
- The Story of the Jewish Legion, New York, B. Ackerman, Inc. [c1945]
- The Battle for Jerusalem. Vladimir Jabotinsky, John Henry Patterson, Josiah Wedgwood, Pierre van Paassen explains why a Jewish army is indispensable for the survival of a Jewish nation and preservation of world civilization, American Friends of a Jewish Palestine, New York, The Friends, [1941]
- A Pocket Edition of Several Stories, Mostly Reactionary, Tel-Aviv: Reproduced by Jabotinsky Institute in Israel, [1984]. Reprint. Originally published: Paris, [1925]
- The Five, A Novel of Jewish Life in Turn-of-the-Century Odessa, Paris, [1936]
- Jabotinsky translated Edgar Allan Poe's "The Raven" into Hebrew and Russian, and parts of Dante's Divine Comedy into modern Hebrew verse.
- "The East Bank of the Jordan" (also known as "Two Banks has the Jordan"), a poem by Jabotinsky that became the slogan and one of the most famous songs of Betar
- Vladimir Jabotinsky's Story of My Life, Brian Horowitz & Leonid Katsis, eds., Detroit: Wayne State University Press, 2015.

== See also ==
- Iron Wall (essay)
