= Fascism in Asia =

Fascist movements and ideologies gained varying degrees of popularity across Asia during the interwar period (between World War I and World War II). These developments were often characterised by a synthesis of European fascist models – such as Italian fascism and Nazism – with indigenous ultranationalism, traditionalist conservatism, and anti-colonial sentiment. Some movements, such as those in Japan during the Showa era, achieved state power; however, others remained fringe political entities or served as paramilitary adjuncts to broader nationalist fronts.

== East Asia ==
=== China ===
==== Republic of China ====
Academic Maggie Clinton has used the term fascism to describe certain positions of the Blue Shirts Society and CC Clique in the Republic of China. Frederic Wakeman, an American historian, suggested that the Chiang Kai-shek's New Life Movement was "Confucian fascism".

==== People's Republic of China ====
According to economist John Weeks, similarities between the People's Republic of China (PRC) in the 21st century and classical fascist regimes lie in two areas: their proximity to state capitalism (rather than orthodox communism), and their anti-democratic, anti-labour, and chauvinistic expansionism. However, other authors have called descriptions labeling the PRC as fascist "superficial". For example, historian John Delury criticised the use of the term fascist to describe contemporary China, and journalist Edward Luce termed such analogies "ahistorical".

=== Japan ===
==== Emperor-system fascism ====
"Emperor-system fascism" (天皇制ファシズム, Tennōsei fashizumu) reflects a view that ultranationalistic politics, society, and ideas based on the Empire of Japan's "Emperor system" were a type of fascism lasting until the end of World War II.

==== Taisei Yokusankai ====
The Imperial Rule Assistance Association (大政翼賛会, Taisei Yokusankai) was created by Prime Minister Fumimaro Konoe on 12 October 1940. The association evolved into a militaristic and para-fascist political party that aimed to remove sectionalism from the politics and economy of the Empire of Japan. The goal was to create a totalitarian one-party state, in order to maximise the efficiency of Japan's total war effort during World War II.

==== Tohokai ====
Tohokai was a Japanese Nazi party formed by journalist and politician Seigo Nakano.

==== National Socialist Workers' Party ====
The National Socialist Japanese Workers' Party is a small neo-Nazi party that is now classified as an uyoku dantai (a small Japanese ultranationalist far-right group).

== South Asia ==
=== India ===
Once the flag of the historical Maratha Empire, the Bhagwa Dhwaj (saffron flag) has since been appropriated as a symbol of the Hindutva ideology.

Hindutva is a far-right Hindu nationalist ideology. Inspired by the rise of fascist movements in Interwar Europe, Hindutva was formulated by politician and ideologue Vinayak Damodar Savarkar in 1922. The ideology is championed by several organisations: the Hindu nationalist paramilitary volunteer organisation Rashtriya Swayamsevak Sangh (RSS), the Vishva Hindu Parishad (VHP), the ruling Bharatiya Janata Party (BJP), and other organisations – collectively called the Sangh Parivar. Hindutva has been described as "almost fascist in the classical sense", following a concept of homogenised majority and cultural hegemony. Some analysts dispute the "fascist" label and suggest that Hindutva is an extreme form of conservatism or ethno-nationalism. Some Hindutva organisations advocate the irredentist concept of Akhand Bharat (unified Greater India). Since the 2014 general election and the subsequent prime ministership of Narendra Modi, India has seen a significant mainstreaming of Hindutva within state discourse.

Indian independence activist and militant nationalist Subhas Chandra Bose insisted on the union of Nazism and communism, in what he termed "Sāmyavāda".

=== Pakistan ===
Pakistan's Tehreek-e-Labbaik Pakistan party is considered fascist by some analysts because of its engagement in Islamic extremism and militant terrorism.

== West Asia ==
=== Iran ===
Fascism in Iran was represented by the SUMKA (Hezb-e Sosialist-e Melli-ye Kargaran-e Iran; transl. National Socialist Workers Party of Iran), a neo-Nazi party founded by the former SS member Davud Monshizadeh in 1952. SUMKA copied not only the ideology of the Nazi Party but also that group's style – adopting the swastika, the black shirt and the Hitler salute. At the same time, Monshizadeh sought to cultivate an appearance like that of Adolf Hitler. The group became associated with opposition to Prime Minister Mohammad Mosaddegh and the Tudeh Party. The Azure Party and the Aria Party were other fascist groups in Iran. In addition, the contemporary Pan-Iranist Party is a right-wing group that has been viewed as fascist because it adhered to chauvinism and irredentism. After the Iranian Revolution of 1979, right-wing populist politician and former ultraconservative ("deviant current") Iranian president Mahmoud Ahmadinejad was suspected of being a "fascist".

=== Iraq ===
The Al-Muthanna Club (Arabic: نادي المثنى, Nadi al-Muthanna) was an influential pan-Arab fascist society established in Baghdad c. 1935–1937; it remained active until May 1941, when the coup d'état of pro-Nazi Prime Minister Rashid Ali al-Gaylani failed. The society was named after al-Muthanna ibn Haritha, an Iraqi Muslim Arab general who led forces that helped to defeat the Persian Sassanids at the Battle of al-Qādisiyyah (in 636 CE). Later known as the National Democratic Party, Nadi al-Muthanna was influenced by European fascism and controlled by radical Arab nationalists; according to political scientist Eric Davis, these nationalists "formed the core of new radicals" for a combined pan-Arab civilian and military coalition.

=== Mandatory Palestine ===
During the interwar period in Mandatory Palestine, a short-lived fascist-inspired ideology known as Revisionist Maximalism emerged within the broader Zionist Revisionist Movement (ZRM). Formed in 1930 by Abba Achimeir – a self-described fascist who rejected liberalism and humanism – this ideology served as the foundation for the radical underground faction Brit HaBirionim. Driven by a rejection of British colonial rule and rising regional tensions following riots in 1929, the maximalists advocated an integralist, militant nationalism modelled on Italian fascism; this included a demand in 1932 for the ZRM to adopt dictatorial policies "in the spirit of complete fascism". This demand was fiercely resisted by moderate democratic revisionists such as Yaacov Kahan. Despite opposing Nazi anti-Semitism, Achimeir briefly and controversially praised the Nazi Party in early 1933 for its anti-Marxist core and its rejection of Jewish assimilation. This stance provoked swift, overwhelming condemnation across the Zionist spectrum, causing a rapid collapse in internal support; the faction reversed its position to militantly oppose Nazi Germany by mid-1933 before completely disintegrating later that year.

=== Lebanon ===
In Lebanon, before World War II, two groups emerged who drew inspiration from the fascist movements which were active in Europe at that time:

- In 1936, Pierre Gemayel founded the Kataeb Party (also known as the Phalange Party). This party took its inspiration from European fascists, using the Nazi salute and a brown-shirted uniform. The Kataeb Party also promoted a strong sense of Lebanese nationalism and a leadership cult. However, the party did not support totalitarianism; as a result, it cannot be characterised as fully fascist.
- Al-Najada.

Both groups remain active, although neither demonstrates the characteristics of fascism.

The Syrian Social Nationalist Party (SSNP; French: Parti populaire syrien [PPS]) was founded in Beirut in 1932 as a Greater Syrian enterprise; it has been influential in Lebanon and beyond. The party has faced accusations of having a fascist-like ideology.

=== Syria ===
The SSNP was founded in 1932 by Antun Saadeh to restore independence to Syria from France; the party took its lead from Nazism and fascism. This group used the Roman salute and a symbol similar to the swastika. Saadeh borrowed elements of Nazi ideology, notably a cult of personality and a yearning for a mythical, racially pure golden age. In addition, a youth group – modelled on the Hitler Youth – was organised.

In 1952, the Syrian dictator and military officer Adib Shishakli founded the Arab Liberation Movement, based on the idea of a "Greater Syria" (like the SSNP, Shishakli's former party) and Arab nationalism, but with additional fascistic elements. After the 1963 Syrian coup d'état, the Arab Liberation Movement was banned.

=== Turkey ===
In Turkey, the group known as the Grey Wolves is widely regarded as neo-fascist; they are understood to operate as a paramilitary group and are famous for a salute known as the wolf salute. The Grey Wolves are regarded as a terrorist group in Austria, Kazakhstan and France.

== See also ==
- Anti-fascism
- Fascism in Europe
- Fascism in North America
- Fascism in South America
- Islamofascism
- Post–World War II anti-fascism
- Racism in Asia
- Racism in Europe
- Relations between Nazi Germany and the Arab world
