= Yehoshua Yeivin =

(1891–1970) Israeli writer, publicist, public figure

- יהושע ייבין
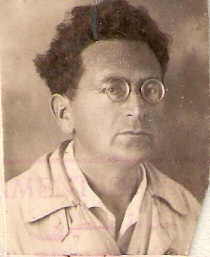
- Born: May 10, 1891; Vinnytsia, Russian Empire
- Died: April 13, 1970 (aged 78); Jerusalem, Israel
- Political party: Brit HaBirionim

Yehoshua Heschel Yeivin (Hebrew: יהושע השל ייבין; 10 May 1891 — 13 April 1970; also spelled Yehoshua Yevin) was an Israeli doctor, writer, translator, journalist, and leader within the Revisionist Zionist movement.

== Early life ==
Yehoshua Heschel Yeivin was born on 10 May 1891 in Vinnytsia, in the south-west of the Russian Empire (today Ukraine), to parents Yisrael (son of Isaac) and Rachel (née Marshalkovich) Yeivin. Yisrael Yeivin was from a middle-class, traditional Hasidic family, while Rachel was descended from a well known non-Hasidic religious family; Yisrael was a descendant of the Rabbi Jacob Yosef of Ostroh, revered head of a Hasidic dynasty. Rachel was descended from the administrative leader (Marszał) of Polish Jewry, Rabbi David Halevy Parness. At the age of four, Yehoshua was orphaned, and from then on was raised by his maternal grandmother Tzina Golda Marshalkovich in Mezhirichi.

Yeivin received a traditional Jewish education, initially studying Torah and Mishnah privately, before continuing his education at the Hebrew Gymnasium in Vilna. He was said to have excelled in his religious education and that, by eight years old, he had already memorized the entire Book of Isaiah.

From a young age, he was interested in Zionist ideas, serving as a member of the "Yavna" Zionist Association and as a member of the local "Foreign Language Enthusiasts" club, where he gave lectures in Hebrew.

Yeivin later studied medicine at the University of Moscow. After completing his studies, he was drafted into the Russian Army and served as a doctor during the First World War. Following the war, he began a literary career in both Yiddish and Hebrew, publishing poems, short stories, and reflections in local Jewish publications. Many of his early works reflect on his experiences in the war. In 1919, his story "Amongst the Evening Shadows" ("בין צללי ערב") was published in the Odessa-based magazine Mashuat ("משואות"), edited by Moshe Glikson (later the editor of Ha'aretz newspaper).

In 1919, he moved to Vilna, where he made his living as a doctor and as a Hebrew teacher; soon after, he decided to focus on his literary career rather than medicine. By 1922, he moved to Berlin, where he became active in the left-wing Zionist organization Poale Zion and began to work full-time as a writer and translator. He translated several works of French literature into Hebrew and Yiddish, including works by Romain Rolland, Guy de Maupassant, and Henri Bergson.

In 1922, he married Miriam-Atara Margolin, the daughter of publisher Shraga Feivel Margolin. In 1923, their first son, Yisrael, was born. The following year, the family made aliyah, relocating to Mandatory Palestine.

== Political activity ==
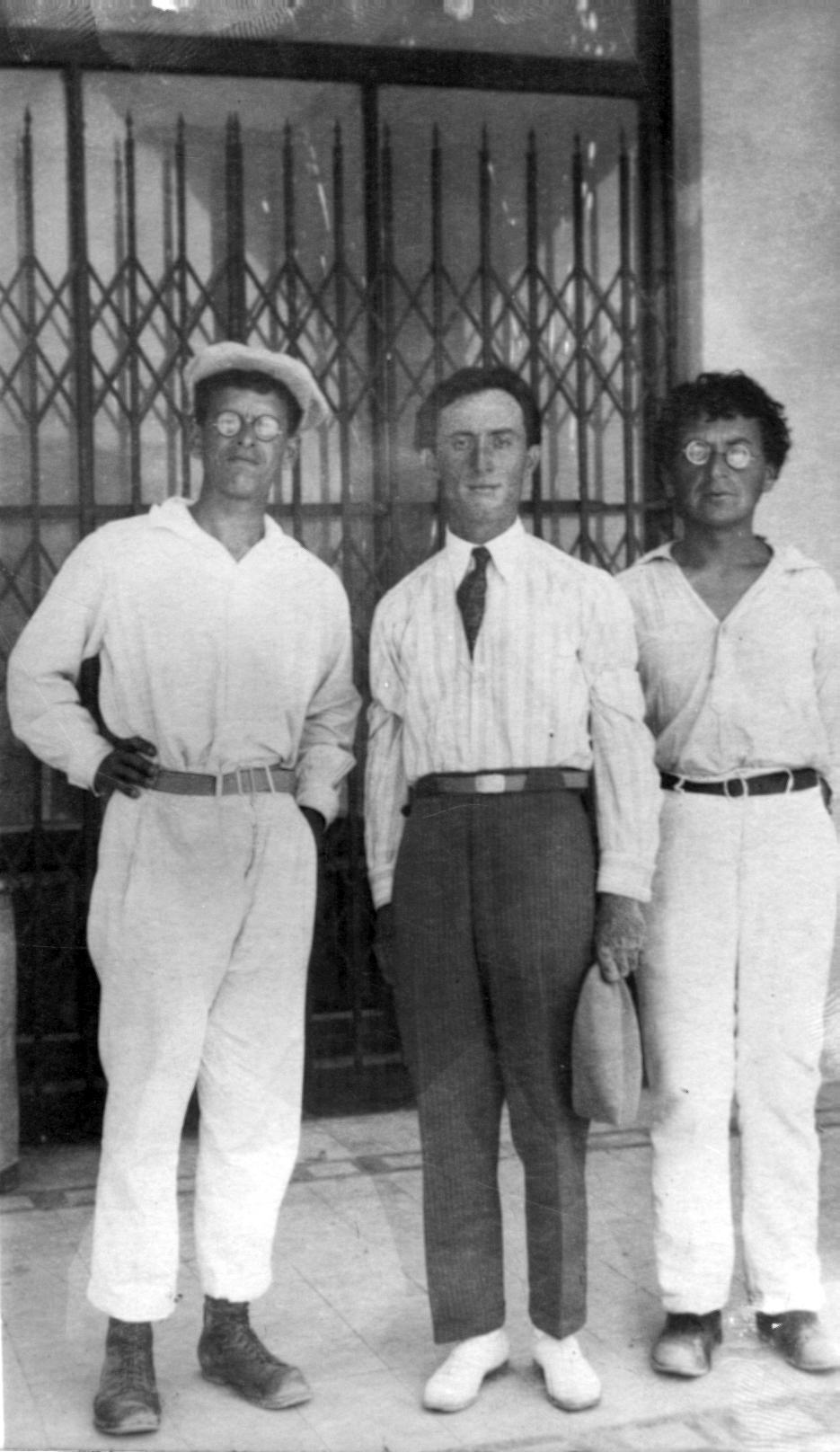
The Revisionist Maximalist leaders in 1927: Abba Ahimeir, Uri Zvi Greenberg, and Yehoshua Yeivin (L to R).

In 1924, Yeivin was hired by the Histadrut, the largest Jewish trade union in Palestine, to work as a teacher in the Jezreel Valley. Yeivin was active in the labour movement and published regularly in Labour Zionist journals.

In 1926, his second son, Ze'ev, was born. In 1928, following financial hardships, the family left Palestine and temporarily relocated to Berlin, returning to Palestine in 1930.

Yeivin, increasingly dissatisfied with what he regarded as the privileging of socialism over Zionist goals, split with the Labour Zionist movement in 1928. He then moved towards the right-wing Revisionist movement.

In February 1928, he participated in a summit of Revisionist Zionist workers, and founded the "Revisionist Labour Group" ("גוש העבודה הרוויזיוניסטי") alongside Abba Ahimeir and Uri Zvi Greenberg. From then on, Yeivin became one of the main thinkers of Revisionist Maximalist ideology, a far-right variant of Zionism which took inspiration from the militant practices of Italian fascism. He was hired by Ze'ev Jabotinsky to contribute to Doar Ha'Yom (דאר היום), a daily founded by Itamar Ben-Avi. By 1929, the newspaper had become one of the major Revisionist mouthpieces, and Yeivin took on an editorial role. He would also serve as editor at Ha'Zit Ha'Am (חזית העם).

Following the 1929 Palestine riots, in 1930, Ahimeir, Greenberg, and Yeivin founded Brit HaBirionim (ברית הבריונים), a clandestine, militant, and self-declared fascist group. Brit HaBirionim sought to overthrow British rule in Palestine and establish a Jewish state based on nationalist, integralist principles. The group participated in several actions, mostly anti-British in nature, including organizing protests against the British-led census and against visits from British officials. Members of Brit HaBirionim defied British orders by blowing the shofar at the Western Wall in 1930. In 1933, the group firebombed the German consulate in Jerusalem and tore down the swastika flag from German consulates in Jerusalem and Jaffa.

Following the assassination of Labour Zionist leader Haim Arlosoroff in 1933, members of Brit HaBirionim were accused of complicity. Yeivin was imprisoned for four months in Jerusalem, being released in November 1934. The trial damaged the group's reputation and led to the dissolution of Brit HaBirionim.

From 1937 to 1939, Yeivin served as a publicist and journalist for the Irgun, publishing articles in the Palestine-based papers Ha'Metzudah (המצודה) and Omer La'Am (אומר לעם), as well as the underground Poland-based, Yiddish-language paper Di Tat (די טאַט). In 1939, he began to write broadcasts for the Irgun-led radio station, Kol Zion Ha'Lochemet (קול ציון הלוחמת), alongside Avraham ("Yair") Stern and David Raziel.

Yeivin also published a monograph on his friend and political collaborator Uri Zvi Greenberg, titled Uri Zvi Greenberg, the Poet-Lawyer (אורי צבי גרינברג משורר מחוקק), in 1936. Greenberg lived with the Yeivin family throughout the 1930s and 1940s.

From 1940 to 1948, Yeivin continued to write and translate literature. He published short stories and political essays, which called for the establishment of a Jewish state based on Biblical borders, in the monthly journal Solam (סולם).

His second son, Ze'ev, became a member of Lehi in 1946.

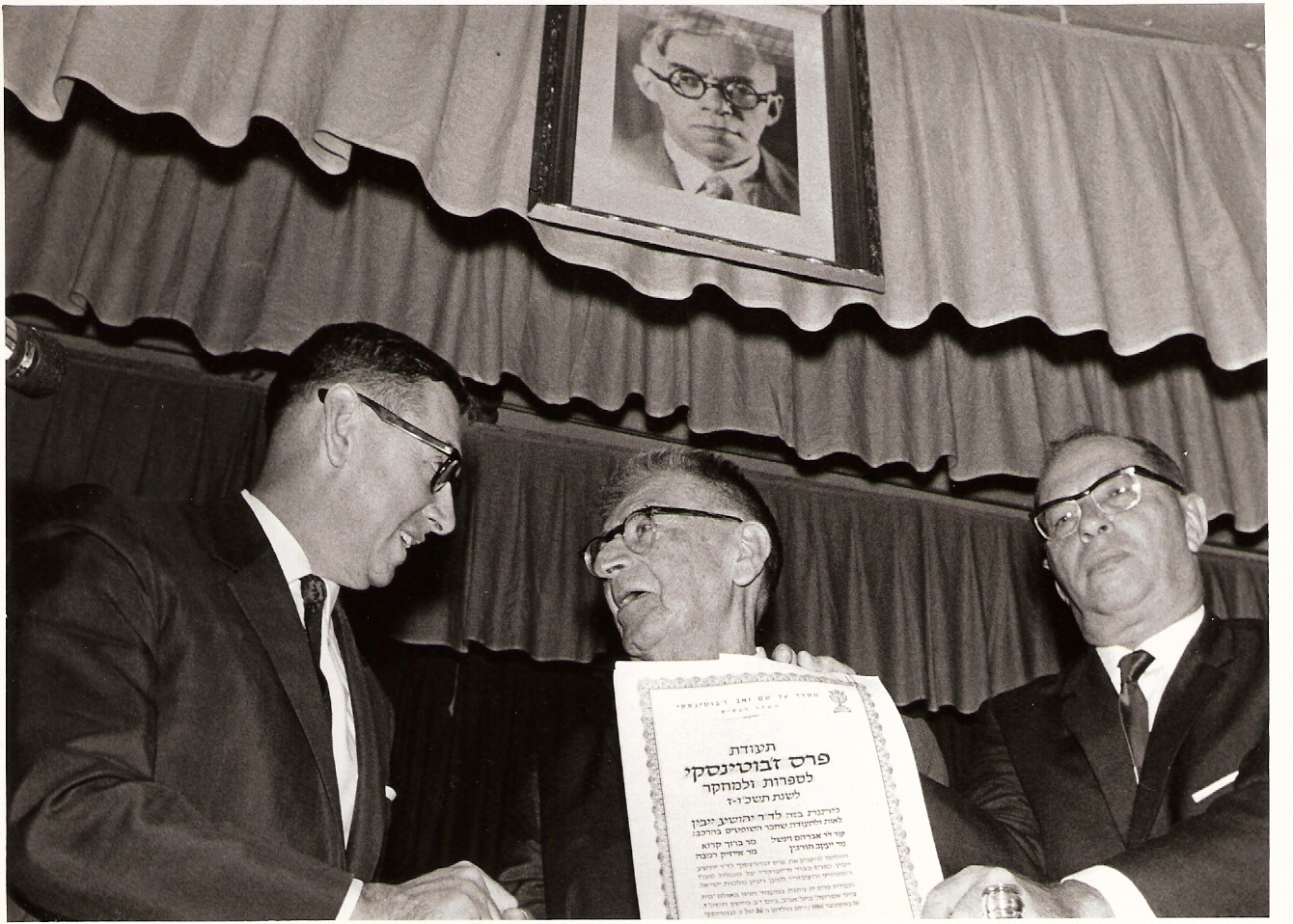
Yeivin is presented with the Jabotinsky Award, 1966.

== Later life ==
After the establishment of the State of Israel in 1948, Yeivin's political publishing became less frequent. He also began to suffer from health problems and was going blind.

In 1959, despite the loss of his eyesight, he won Israel's National Bible Championship.

In 1966, Yeivin was presented with the Jabotinsky Award for his contributions to literature.

Yeivin's wife, Miriam-Atara, died in 1966 at the age of 70. The couple's first son, Yisrael, was a lecturer in Hebrew language and literature at the Hebrew University of Jerusalem, who was awarded the Israel Prize in 1989 for his contributions to the study of the Hebrew language. His second son, Ze'ev, served as a member of Lehi until 1948, at which point he joined the Israel Defence Forces, with whom he would serve until 1951. Later, Ze'ev studied geography, geology, and history at Hebrew University. He earned a PhD in 1971 and worked in Israel's Antiquities Authority until 1991.
