= Israel Yeivin =

Israeli linguist and Masorah scholar

- ישראל ייבין
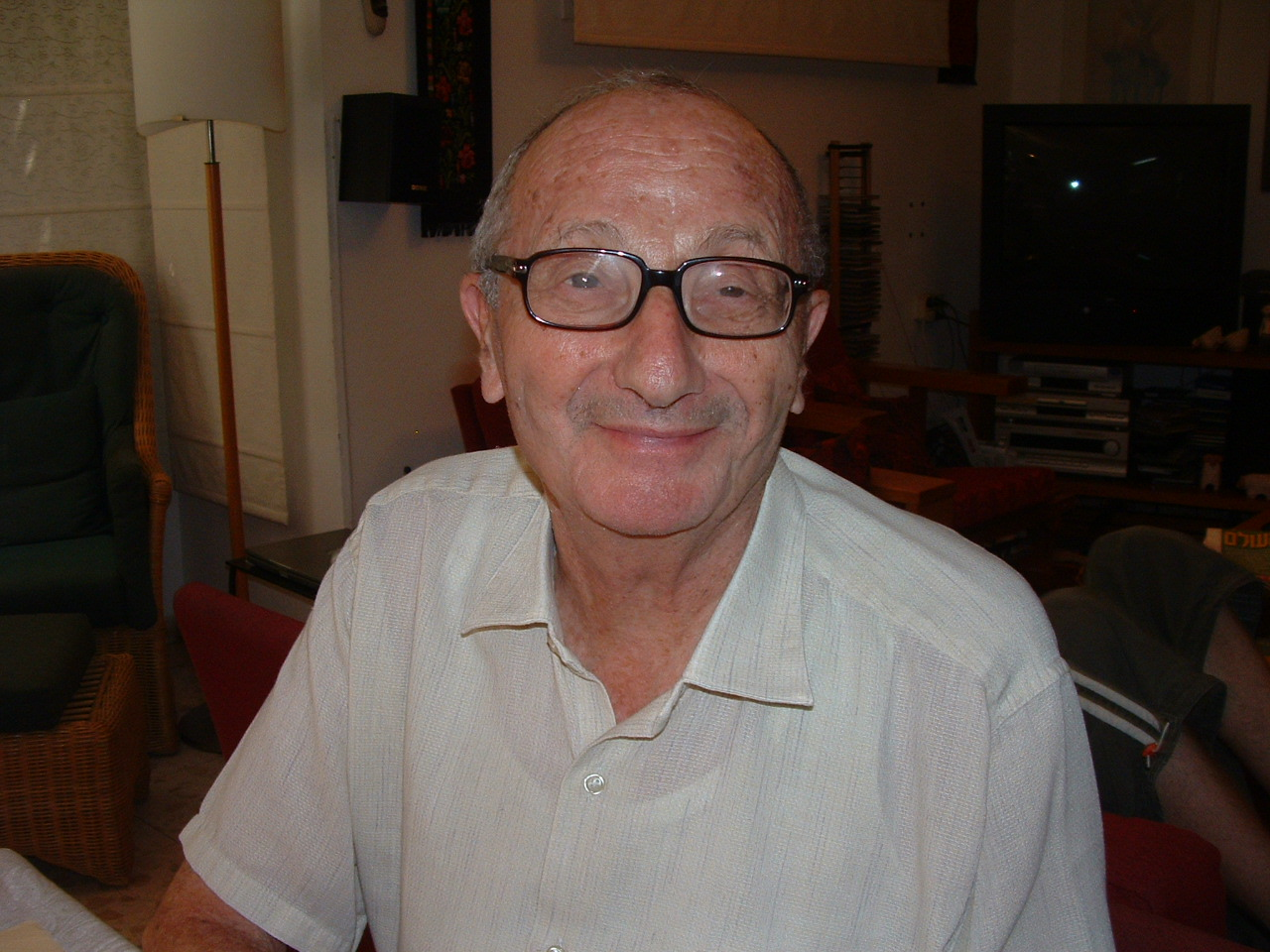
- Israel Yeivin in 2007
- Born: 7 January 1923; Berlin, Germany
- Died: 19 December 2008 (aged 85); Jerusalem, Israel
- Awards: Friedenberg Prize (1986); Israel Prize (1989)

Academic work
- Discipline: Linguistics
- Sub-discipline: Masorah; Hebrew language
- Institutions: Hebrew University of Jerusalem
- Notable works: The Hebrew Language Tradition as Reflected in the Babylonian Vocalization

Israel Yeivin (Hebrew: ישראל ייבין; January 7, 1923, in Berlin – December 19, 2008) was an Israeli linguist, scholar of Masorah and the Hebrew language.

== Biography ==
Israel Yeivin was born in Berlin. His family immigrated to Mandatory Palestine when he was seven, and he grew up in Tel Aviv. His father, Yehoshua Yeivin, was a conceptual philosopher of the Revisionist Zionism movement and founder of the radical Zionist group Brit HaBirionim. His mother was Miryam Atara Margolin. As a child, he attended Ahad Ha'Am School and graduated from Gymnasia Balfour in 1940. Soon after, he began to study Hebrew language and literature and philosophy at the Hebrew University of Jerusalem. He received his M.A degree in 1958. His thesis dealt with "Hakafat HaTevot HaZeirot BaMikra (21 Sfarim)".

In 1958, he married Batya Heifetz, with whom he had two sons.

In 1968 he received his doctorate for his research on "Babylonian point vocalization". While studying at the university, he worked at a printing shop as a typesetter and proofreader. Then he became a proofreader on the editorial staff of the Hebrew Encyclopedia. He worked on the preparatory stage of the Encyclopedia Judaica and became Editorial Secretary of the Tarbitz quarterly. Working on the Bible Project of the Hebrew University, he became expert in deciphering ancient manuscripts of the Bible, including The Aleppo Codex, on which he published a book.

== Academic and linguistics career ==
In 1959, Yeivin joined the Academy of the Hebrew Language's project to publish a historic dictionary of the Hebrew language. He served on the dictionary's editorial board for more than 30 years, heading the research team for Biblical Hebrew. From 1968, he taught at the Hebrew University's Department of Language, where he became a professor and later served as head of the Hebrew Language Department. He retired in 1990 but continued to research the Masorah; Bible accentuation (Ta'amei HaMikra), the traditional language revealed in the Babylonian vocalization, Mishnaic Hebrew, piyyutim (liturgical poetry), and lexicology. He published 3 books and more than 50 research papers.

In 1975, Yeivin spent several months in Cambridge, England helping to unravel and classify documents from the Cairo Geniza. Ezra Fleischer and Jacob Sussmann shared in this work with Yeivin.

== Awards and recognition ==
In 1986, Yeivin was awarded the Friedenberg Prize for his book The Hebrew Language Tradition as Reflected in the Babylonian Vocalization.

In 1989, he was awarded the Israel Prize for the study of the Hebrew language. Among the reasons for their decision, the judges stated that "…he is one of the greatest world authorities in the study of the Masorah and Accentuation (Teamim) and the greatest scholar of the Hebrew Masorah in Babylonian Vocalization."

Yeivin was a member of the Academy of the Hebrew Language from 1987 and member of the Israel Academy of Sciences and Humanities since 1991. He transferred his private collection of micro-films of vocalizations, including parts of hidden archives of Genizah, in vocalization and accentuation to the Institute of Microfilmed Hebrew Manuscripts of the National Library in Jerusalem in memory of his son Dov, who died in 1986. Further in memory of his son Dov, a large part of his rare scholarly collection has been donated to Ariel University in the Israeli-occupied West Bank.

== Selected works ==
- The Aleppo Codex of the Bible: a study of its vocalization and accentuation, 1968.
- The Hebrew Language Tradition as Reflected in the Babylonian Vocalization, 1985.
- The Biblical Masorah, 2003.
- Introduction to the Tiberian Masorah, 1980.

== See also ==
- List of Israel Prize recipients
