= Revisionist Maximalism =

Jewish fascist ideology

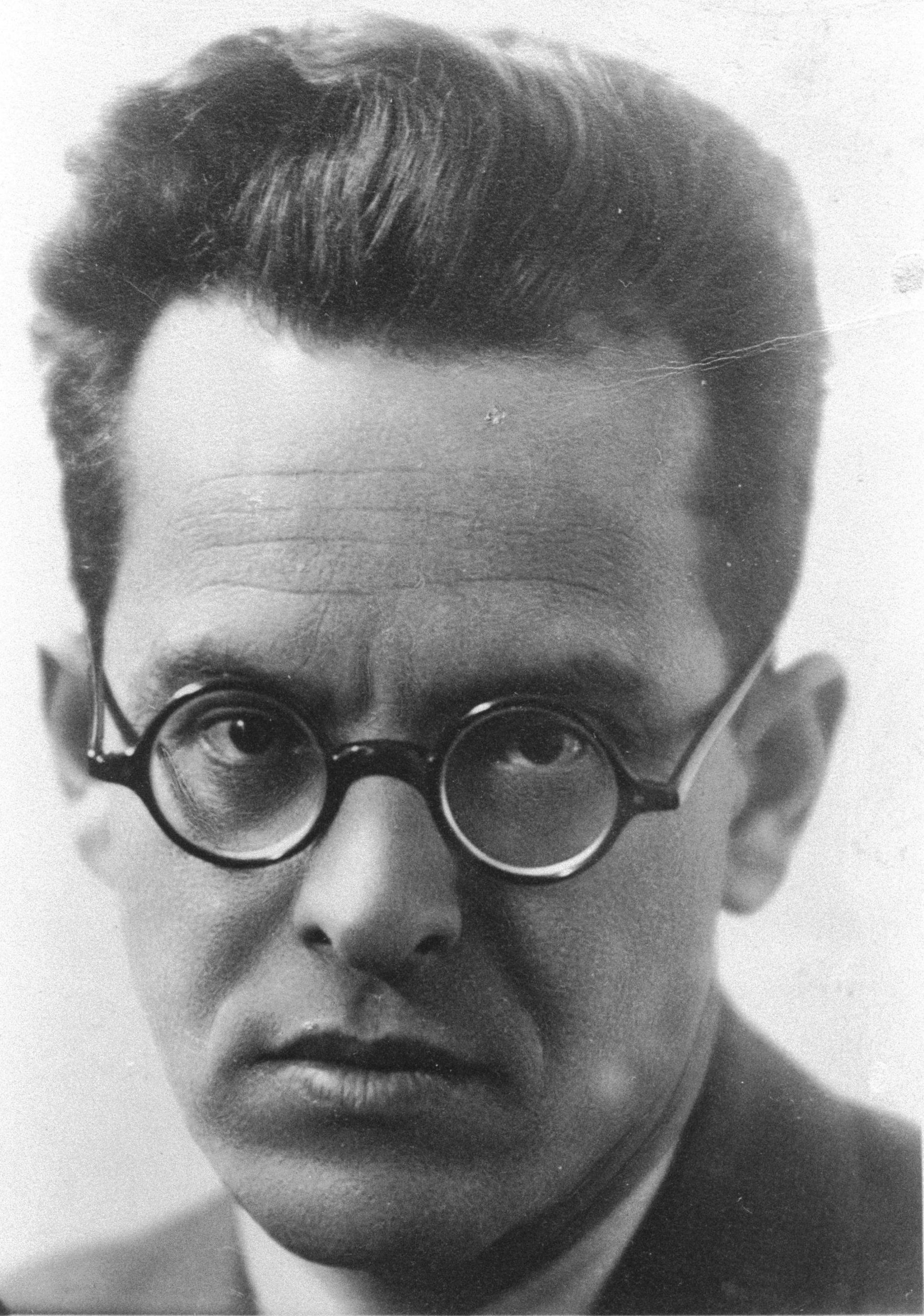
Abba Ahimeir, the founder of Revisionist Maximalism

Revisionist Maximalism was a short-lived right-wing militant political ideology and Jewish militant ideology which was part of the Brit HaBirionim faction of the Zionist Revisionist Movement (ZRM) created by Abba Ahimeir.

== History ==
The ideology and political faction of Revisionist Maximalism was officially created in 1930 by Abba Ahimeir, a Jewish historian, journalist, and politician. Abba Ahimier was born in Russia in 1897 and migrated to Palestine at the age of fifteen. After the end of World War I, Ahimier enrolled the University of Kiev in the Russian Empire, then traveled to Liege and Vienna to complete his academic studies. He then returned to Palestine and became close in contact with other socialist circles, and organizations. In 1928 Ahimier joined Ze'ev Jabotinsky's Revisionist movement and became one of the movement's important activists.

He called for the Zionist Revisionist Movement (ZRM) to adopt the principles of totalitarianism to create a "pure nationalism" amongst Jews. Ahimeir was originally a member of the Jewish Labour Movement who supported the October Revolution in Russia in 1917, and called for Jews to have their "own 1917" and spoke of the need for an October Revolution in Zionism. However Ahimeir grew disillusioned with Russian Bolshevism which he began to see as a Russian nationalist movement rather than a movement to promote international class struggle. Having become disillusioned with communism, Ahimeir grew nationalistic after the Arab-Jewish violence occurred in the British Mandate of Palestine from 1928 to 1929. Revisionist Maximalism rejects communism, humanism, internationalism, liberalism, pacifism and socialism; condemned liberal Zionists for only working for middle-class Jews rather than the Jewish nation as a whole. Soon, Abba Ahimier, the poet Uri Zvi Greenberg, and Wolfgang von Weisl, the chairman of their Palestine central committee, became the ideological leaders of the Revisionists, after Jabotinsky was banned from returning to Palestine by the British authorities, due to his political activities.

During the 1930s, Abba Ahimier Joshua Yevin, and Uri Zvi Grunberg began to establish their own newspaper, Hazit HaAm, and would publish the idea of "Jewish Labor" and emphasized that Jews should be self-reliant and economically independent. In December 1932 Ahimier, along with Weisl, Gruenberg, and his supporters organized a strike-breaking "union" at the Froumine Biscuit Factory in Jerusalem by providing scabs. Then on February 27, 1933, the Maximalist tried to break a building strike in Petah Tikva, where dozens of strikers were arrested for battling the scabs.

In 1930, Brit HaBirionim under Ahimeir's leadership publicly declared their desire to form a fascist state at the conference of the ZRM, saying:

It is not the masses whom we need ... but the minorities ... We want to educate people for the 'Great Day of God' (war or world revolution), so that they will be ready to follow the leader blindly into the greatest danger ... Not a party but an Orden, a group of private [people], devoting themselves and sacrificing themselves for the great goal. They are united in all, but their private lives and their livelihood are the matter of the Orden. Iron discipline; cult of the leader (on the model of the fascists); dictatorship. Abba Achimeir, 1930

Ahimeir claimed that the Jewish people would outlast Arab rule in the region of Palestine, saying:

We fought the Egyptian Pharaoh, the Roman emperors, the Spanish Inquisition, the Russian tsars. They 'defeated' us. But where are they today? Can we not cope with a few despicable muftis or sheiks? ... For us, the forefathers, the prophets, the zealots were not mythological concepts... Abba Achimeir, 1930.

Revisionist Maximalism and the Brit HaBirionim movement were fierce opponents of pacifism, while promoting militarism and demonstrated in 1932 against Norman Bentwich's inaugural lecture on peace to which Ahimeir saying that "It is not a cathedral to international peace in the name of Bentwich that we need, but a military academy in the name of Ze'ev Jabotinsky" and said "we can defend the honour of Israel ... not by filling our bellies with lectures on peace ... but rather by learning the doctrine of Jabotinsky". Brit HaBirionim demonstrators outside handed out leaflets declaring that peace studies were "the work of Satan" and were "an anti-Zionist measure, a stab in the back of Zionism.".

Ahimeir believed that his ideology would constitute a "neo-Revisionism" within the Zionist movement that he criticized, and advocated it at a meeting of the Hatzohar movement in Vienna in 1932, saying:

Zionism is imbued with the ghetto and pronouncements. The path to Jewish sovereignty has to cross a bridge of steel, not a bridge of paper. ... I bring to you a new form of social organization, one that is free of principles and parties ... I bring you Neo-Revisionism.

In 1932, Brit HaBirionim pressed the ZRM to adopt their policies which were titled the "Ten Commandments of Maximalism", which were made "[In] the spirit of Complete Fascism", according to Heller. Moderate ZRM members refused to accept this. Moderate ZRM member Yaacov Kahan pressured Brit HaBirionim to accept the democratic nature of the ZRM and not push for the party to adopt fascist dictatorial policies.

=== Collapse ===
Despite the Revisionist Maximalists' opposition to the antisemitism of the Nazi Party, Achimeir was initially controversially supportive of the Nazi Party in early 1933, believing that the Nazis' rise to power was positive because it recognized that previous attempts by Germany to assimilate Jews had finally been proven to be failures. In March 1933, Achimeir wrote about the Nazi party, stating, "The anti-Semitic wrapping should be discarded but not its anti-Marxist core...." Achimeir personally believed that the Nazis' anti-Semitism was just a nationalist ploy that did not have substance.

After Achimeir supported the Nazis, other Zionists within the ZRM quickly condemned Achimeir and the Revisionist Maximalists for their support of Hitler. Achimeir, in response to the outrage, in May 1933 reversed their position and opposed Nazi Germany and began to burn down German consulates and tear down Germany's flag. However, in 1933, Revisionist Maximalist' support quickly deteriorated and fell apart; they would not be reorganized until 1938, after a new leader replaced Achimeir.

== Ideology ==
Revisionist Maximalists strongly supported the Italian fascist regime of Benito Mussolini and wanted the creation of a Jewish state based on fascist principles. The Revisionist Maximalists support collapsed in 1933 after Ahimeir's support for the assassination of Haim Arlosoroff.

The Maximalist goal was to "extract Revisionism from its liberal entrapment", as they wanted Jabotinsky's status to be elevated to a dictator, and desired to force integrate the population of Palestine into Hebrew society. The Maximalists believed that authoritarianism and national solidarity was necessary to have the public collaborate with the government, and to create total unity in Palestine.

The label of "fascist" has nevertheless to be regarded with reserves because in that period as later it was used often abusively in the disputes between opposed political non-fascist factions, as in the 1930s even the Social Democrat parties were accused by Stalin and the communists of being "fascists" or "social-fascists". In the same way in Palestine Revisionist Zionists themselves were often qualified in the 1930s as "fascists" by the Labor Zionist leaders and the Revisionists attacked the social democratic dominated General Confederation of Labor (Histadrut) and Ben Gurion by use of terms like "Red Swastika" and comparisons with fascism and Hitler.

== See also ==
- Fascism in Asia
- Lehi
- Kahanism

== Works cited ==
- Heller, Joseph (2001). "The Failure of Fascism in Jewish Palestine 1925–1948". In Larsen, Stein Ugelvik (ed.). Fascism Outside of Europe. Columbia University Press. pp. 362–392. ISBN 9780880339889.
- Shavit, Yaacov (1988). Jabotinsky and the Revisionist Movement, 1925–1948. Frank Cass & Co. Ltd. ISBN 0714633429.
- Shindler, Colin (2006). The Triumph of Military Zionism: Nationalism and the Origins of the Israeli Right. I.B. Tauris. ISBN 978-1845110307.
- Tamir, Dan (2014). "From a Fascist's Notebook to the Principles of Rebirth: The Desire for Social Integration in Hebrew Fascism, 1928–1942". The Historical Journal. 57 (4): 1062–1082. doi:10.1017/S0018246X14000053.
