= Abba Ahimeir =

Russian-born Revisionist Zionist leader (1897–1962)

- אבא אחימאיר; Аба Гайсинович
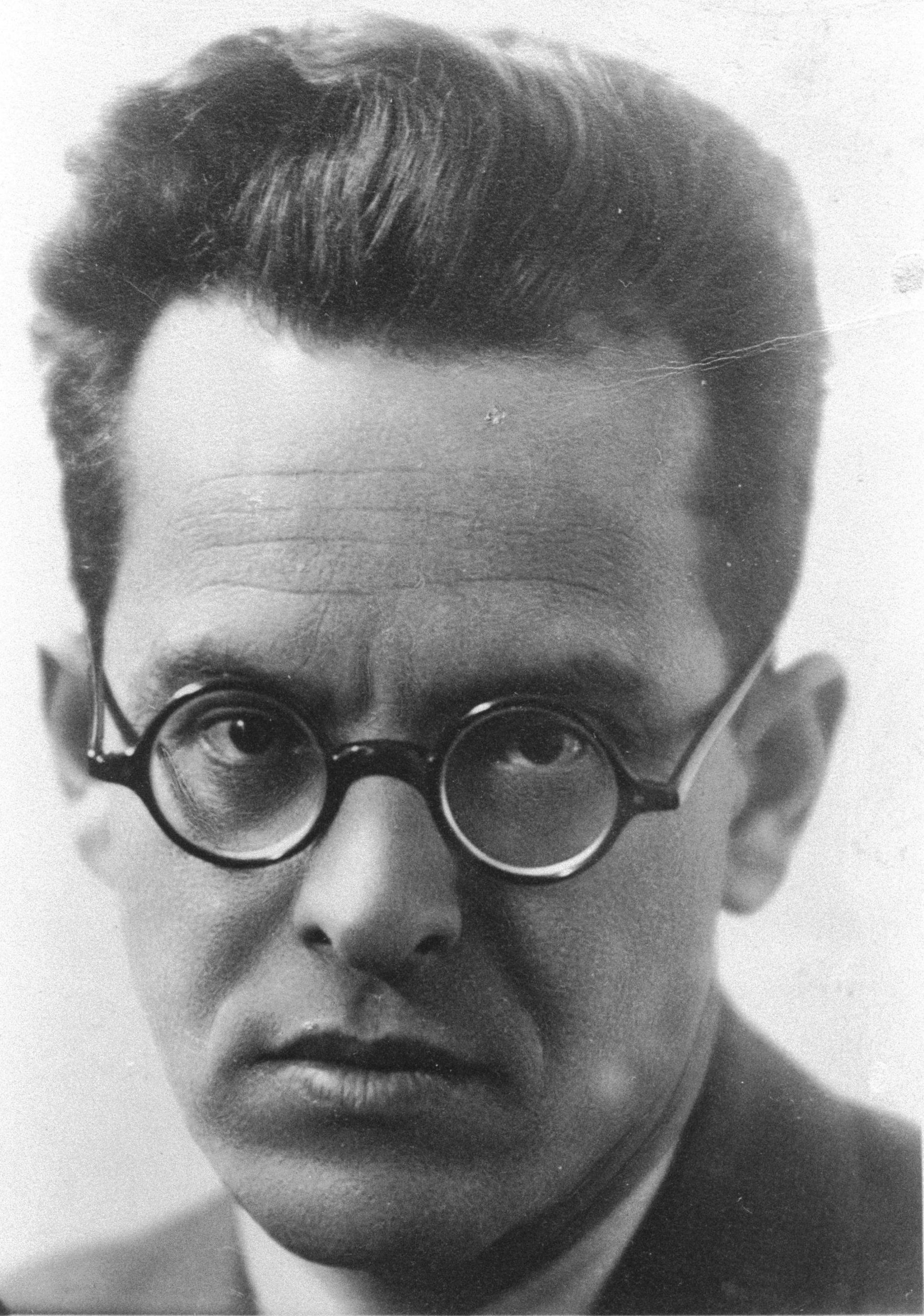
- Ahimeir in 1932
- Born: Abba Shaul Gaisinovich; 2 November 1897; Babruysk, Minsk Governorate, Russian Empire (present-day Belarus)
- Died: 6 June 1962 (aged 64); Tel Aviv, Israel
- Resting place: Nahalat Yitzhak Cemetery
- Occupations: Journalist; historian; political activist
- Known for: Founder of Revisionist Maximalism
- Political party: Revisionist Zionism, Brit HaBirionim
- Children: Ya'akov Ahimeir, Yosef Ahimeir

Signature
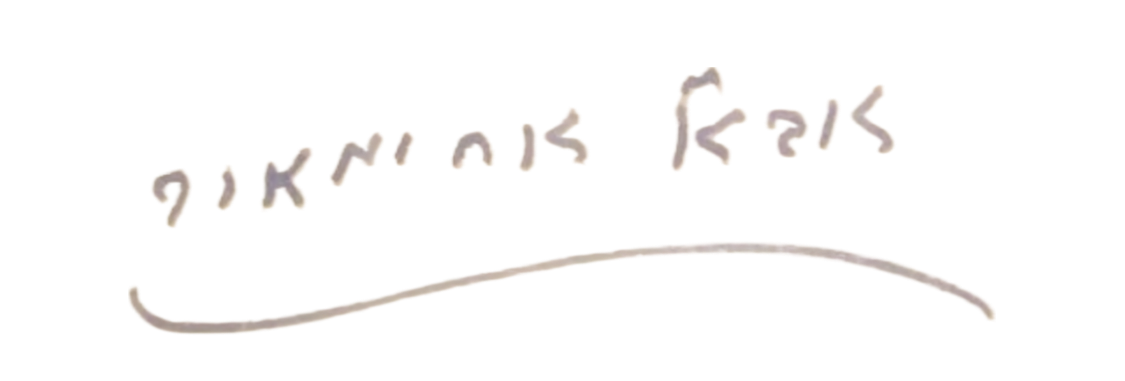

Abba Ahimeir (Hebrew: אב"א אחימאיר, Russian: Аба Шойл Гайсинович; 2 November 1897 – 6 June 1962) was a Russian-born Israeli journalist, historian, and fascist political activist. One of the ideologues of Revisionist Zionism, he was the founder of the Revisionist Maximalist faction of the Zionist Revisionist Movement (ZRM) and of the clandestine Brit HaBirionim.

== Biography ==
Abba Shaul Gaisinovich (later Abba Ahimeir) was born in Dolgoe, a village near Babruysk in the Russian Empire (today in Belarus). From 1912 to 1914, he attended the Herzliya Gymnasium high school in Tel Aviv. While with his family in Babruysk for summer vacation in 1914, World War I broke out and he was forced to complete his studies in Russia. In 1917, he participated in the Russian Zionist Conference in Petrograd and underwent agricultural training as part of Joseph Trumpeldor’s HeHalutz movement in Batum, Caucasia to prepare him for a life as a pioneer in the Land of Israel. In 1920, he left Russia and changed his name from Gaisinovich to Ahimeir (in Hebrew: Meir’s brother) in memory of his brother Meir who had fallen in battle that year fighting against Poles during a pogrom.

Ahimeir studied philosophy at the Liège University in Belgium and at the University of Vienna, completing his PhD thesis on Oswald Spengler's The Decline of the West in 1924 just before immigrating to the British Mandate of Palestine. Upon his arrival in the country, Ahimeir became active in the Labor Zionist movements Ahdut HaAvoda and Hapoel Hatzair. For four years, he served as librarian for the cultural committee of the General Workers Organization in Zikhron Ya'akov and as a teacher in Nahalal and Kibutz Geva. During these years he regularly published articles in Haaretz and Davar, where he began to criticize the political situation in Palestine and of Zionism, as well as of the workers’ movement to which he belonged.

== Political activism ==
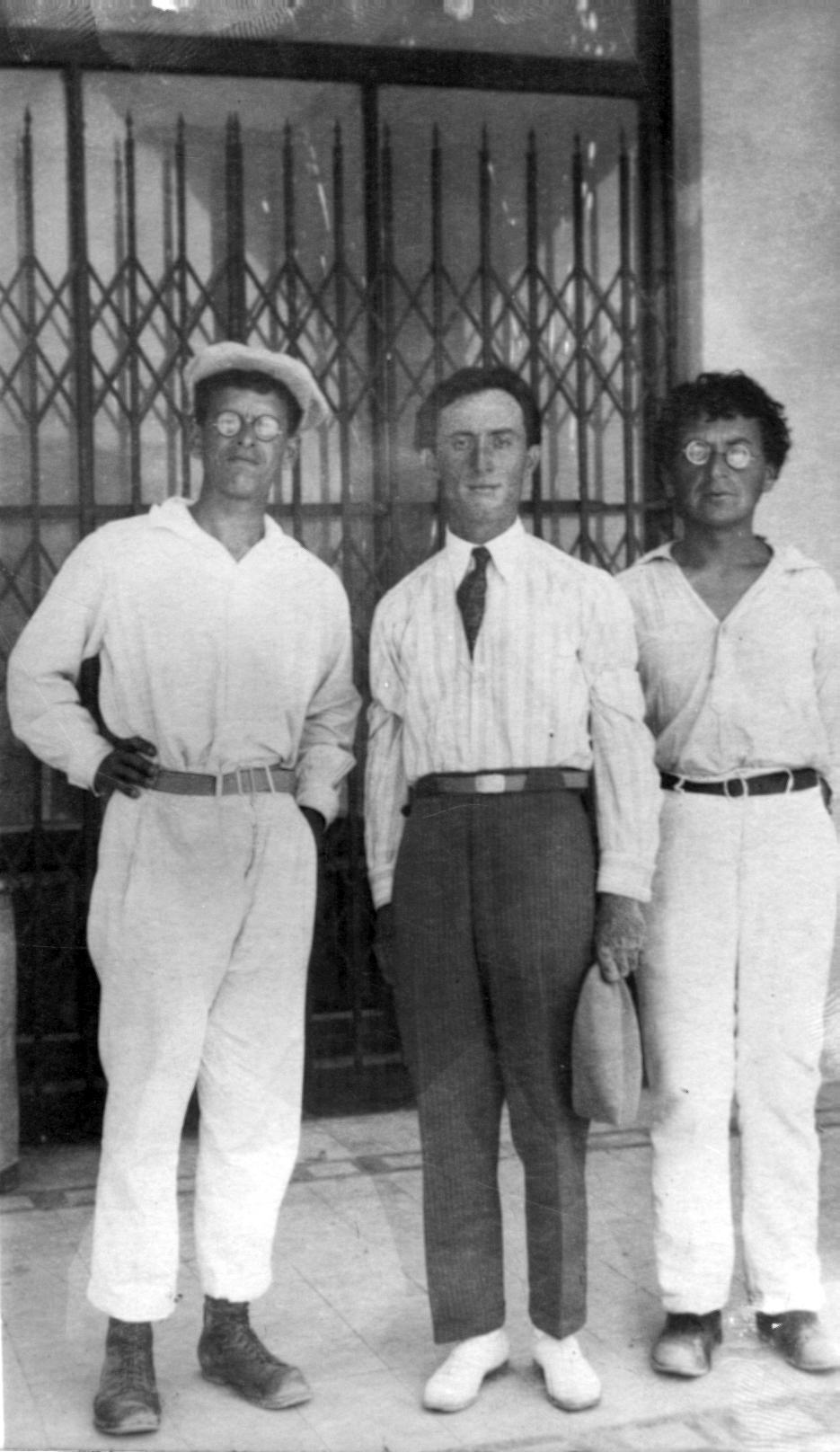
Ahimeir (left) with Uri Zvi Grinberg (center) and Yehoshua Yeivin (right) in 1927

In 1928, Ahimeir, along with Yehoshua Yeivin and famed Hebrew poet Uri Zvi Greenberg, became disillusioned with what they viewed to be the passivity of Labor Zionism and founded the Revisionist Labor Bloc as part of Ze’ev Jabotinsky’s Revisionist Zionist Movement. Ahimeir and his group were regarded by Revisionist Movement leaders as an implant from the Left whose political Maximalism and revolutionary brand of nationalism often made the Revisionist old guard uncomfortable.

In 1930, Ahimeir and his friends established the underground movement Brit HaBirionim (The Union of Zealots) named for the Jewish anti-Roman underground during the first Jewish-Roman War.

Brit HaBirionim was the first Jewish organization in Palestine to call for the independence and creation of a Jewish state in the region. The group formulated a series of protests directed against the Under-Secretary of State for the Colonies, Drummond Shiels, when he was on a visit to Tel-Aviv on October 9, 1930 calling for the end to the mandate. This was the first movement calling for independence by Jews in Palestine, and it would go on to have a major influence on other Jewish groups such as the Irgun and the Lehi. In 1931, Ahimeir also led a protest against the census of Palestine, which he urged his fellow Jews to refrain from partaking in, using the slogan al tippaqdu ("do not be counted"). At the 1932 Hatzohar conference in Tel Aviv, Ahimeir said it was a disaster that Zionism "was educated and developed in line with the liberal point of view."

In 1933, Brit HaBirionim turned its activities against Nazi Germany. In May of that year, Ahimeir led his followers in a campaign to remove swastikas from the flagpoles of the German consulates in Jerusalem and Jaffa. Brit HaBirionim also organized a boycott of German goods. Brit Habirionim became fierce critics of the Haavara Agreement and of its chief negotiator, Haim Arlosoroff. When Arlosoroff was killed on a Tel-Aviv beach in June 1933, Ahimeir and two friends were arrested and charged with inciting the murder. Ahimeir was cleared of the charge before the trial even began but remained in prison and began a hunger strike that continued for four days. He was convicted of organizing an illegal clandestine organization and was sentenced to 21 months in prison. He remained in the Jerusalem Central Prison until August 1935. His imprisonment put an end to Brit HaBirionim.

Upon his release, Ahimeir married Sonia née Astrachan and devoted himself to literary work and scholarship. His articles in the newspaper Hayarden led to his re-arrest at the end of 1937. He spent three months in Acre Prison together with members of the Irgun Zvai Leumi and other prominent Revisionist activists.

Following the establishment of the State of Israel in 1948, Ahimeir became a member of the editorial board of the Herut party daily in Tel-Aviv, as well as a member of the editorial board of the Hebrew Encyclopedia in Jerusalem where he published (under the initials A. AH.) scores of important academic articles, mostly in the fields of history and Russian literature. Ahimeir died at the age of 65 of a sudden heart attack on the eve of June 6, 1962. His sons, Ya'akov and Yosef, both went on to become journalists.

== Ideology ==
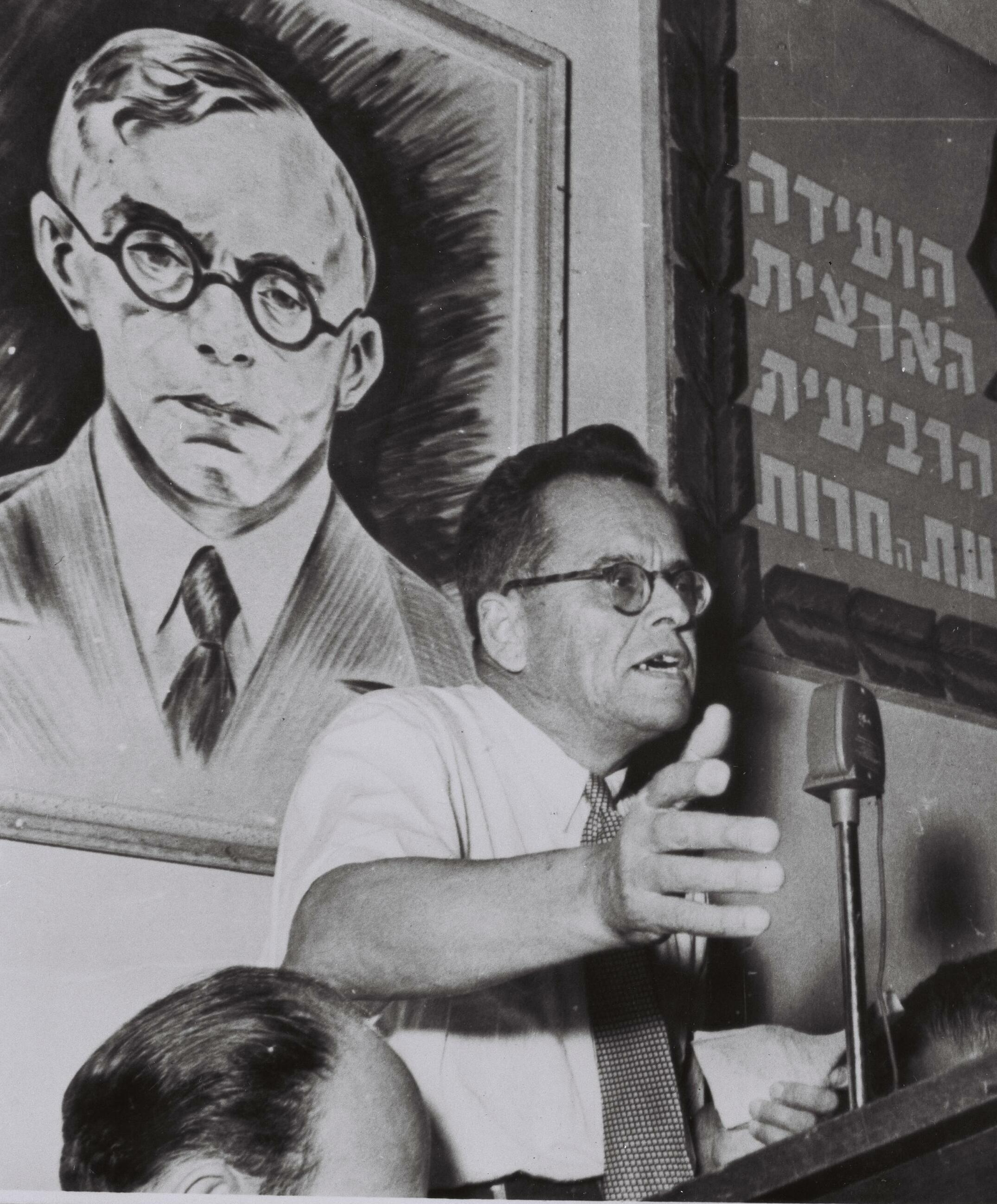
Ahimeir speaking in front of a portrait of Ze'ev Jabotinsky, 1950

Ahimeir regarded Zionism as a secular, territorial phenomenon. He was the first to speak of "revolutionary Zionism," and call for a revolt for the cause of an independent Jewish state. His worldview generally placed the contemporary political situation into the context of Jewish history, specifically the Second Temple Period, often casting himself and his friends as pro-Jewish state freedom fighters, the mandate administration as a modern incarnation of ancient Rome and the official Zionist leadership as Jewish collaborators.

Although Ahimeir described himself as a fascist during the late 1920s, and wrote a series of eight articles in the Hebrew Doar Hayom newspaper in 1928 entitled "From the Notebook of a Fascist," few of his contemporaries took these leanings seriously.

Ze'ev Jabotinsky, who consistently maintained that there was no room for Fascism within his Revisionist movement, dismissed Ahimeir's rhetoric and argued that he and his Maximalist followers were merely playacting to make a point and were not serious in their professed Fascist beliefs. In the 7 October 1932 edition of Hazit HaAm, Jabotinsky wrote:

Such men, even in the Maximalist and activist factions, number no more than two or three, and even with those two or three – pardon my frankness – it is mere phraseology, not a worldview. Even Mr. Ahimeir gives me the impression of a man who will show flexibility for the sake of educational goals. ... to this end he has borrowed some currently fashionable (and quite unnecessary) phrases, in which this daring idea clothes itself in several foreign cities."

Ahimeir himself confirmed that for a while he thought fascism was a realistic way to oppose the "horrors of the Russian revolution" but that he quickly turned his back on Mussolini's ideology and in the beginning of 1929 Jabotinsky "cured him of fascism".

Ahimeir's fascist image during the 1920s was seized upon by author Christopher Hitchens in a 1998 article titled "The Iron Wall" to argue that fascism was the ideology guiding Benzion Netanyahu, a disciple of Ahimeir, and consequently his son, Israeli Prime Minister Benjamin Netanyahu. In an April 16, 2010, interview with The Jerusalem Post, Ahimeir's son Yossi defended his father against accusations of fascism, saying:

"Hitchens is a known anti-Israel writer who takes my father's writing completely out of context. Fascism in 1928 can't be viewed in the context of the 1930s. Of course he would not be a fascist in view of how it developed."
