= 1931 census of Palestine =

Second census by the British Mandate of Palestine

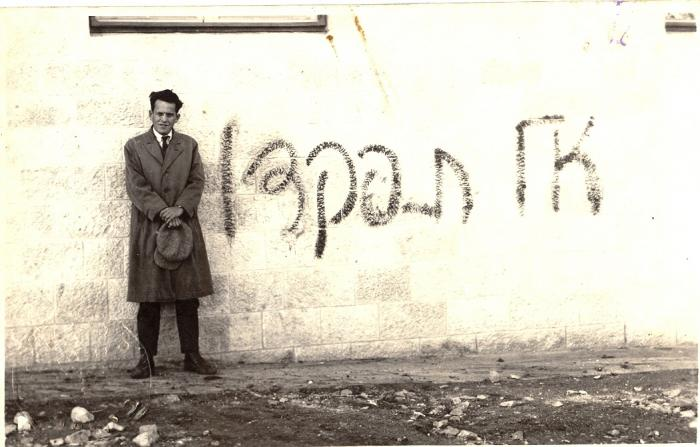
Abba Ahimeir stands next to graffiti that reads "do not be counted".

The 1931 census of Palestine was the second census carried out by the authorities of Mandatory Palestine. It was carried out on 18 November 1931 under the direction of Major E. Mills. A previous census had been carried out in 1922, but no further census was conducted in Palestine by the British administration.

The census found a total population of 1,035,821 (1,033,314 excluding the numbers of British Forces), an increase of 36.8% since 1922, of which the Jewish population increased by 108.4%.

The population was divided by religion as follows: 759,717 Muslims, 174,610 Jews, 91,398 Christians, 9,148 Druzes, 350 Bahais, 182 Samaritans, and 421 reporting no religion. A special problem was posed by the nomadic Bedouin of the south, who were reluctant to co-operate. Estimates of each tribe were made by officers of the district administration according to local observation. The total of 759,717 Muslims included 66,553 persons enumerated by that method. The number of foreign British forces stationed in Palestine in 1931 totalled 2,500.

== Publication ==
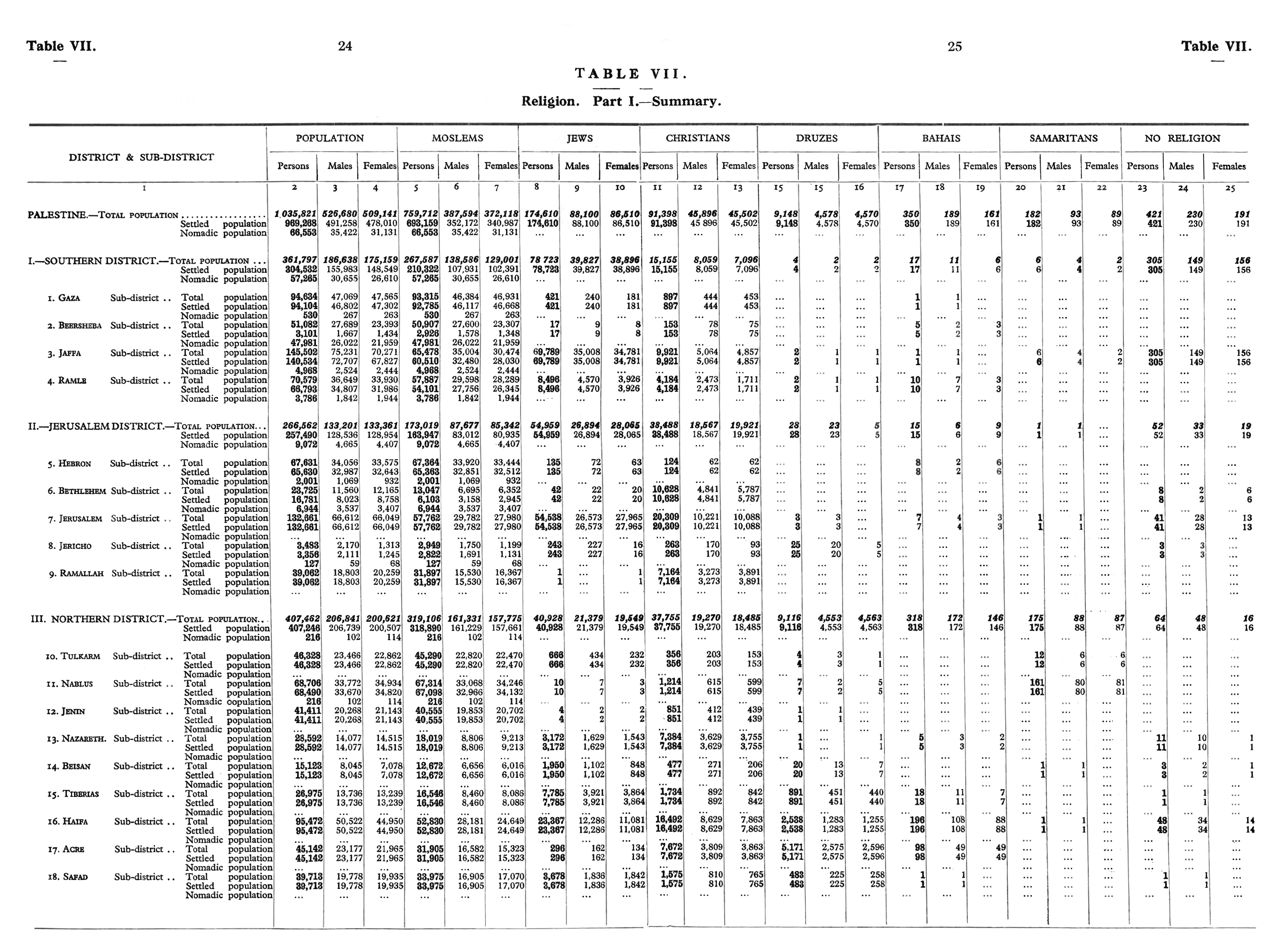
Population of Palestine by religion and settled status, 1931.

Three volumes of data derived from the census were published by the Government of Palestine. They were edited by the Superintendent of Census and Assistant Chief Secretary, E. Mills.

- Census of Palestine 1931. Population of Villages, Towns and Administrative Areas. Jerusalem, 1932 (120 pages).
- Census of Palestine 1931, Volume I. Palestine Part I, Report. Alexandria, 1933 (349 pages).
- Census of Palestine 1931, Volume II. Palestine, Part II, Tables. Alexandria, 1933 (595 pages).
