= At the Hub =

2007 political poem by Uri Zvi Greenberg

- by Uri Zvi Greenberg
- Book cover
- Original title: בַּעֲבִי הַשִּׁיר: מבחר שירים, tr. Ba-'avi ha-shir: Mivhar shirim
- Cover artist: Beno Rothenberg; David Tartakover
- Country: Israel
- Language: Hebrew
- Subjects: 20th century; Christianity; Culture of Europe; Emotion; Europe; Everyday life; Far-right politics; History; History of Europe; History of the Jews in Europe; Human sexuality; The Holocaust; Israel; Jewish culture; Jewish history; Jews; Judaism; Liberty; Loneliness; Melancholia; Mental health; Monarchism; Politics; Philosophy; Psychiatry; Psychology; World War II
- Genres: Counterculture; Erotic literature; Existentialism; Experimental literature; Expressionism; Historical poetry; Jewish literature; Lyric poetry; Modernist poetry; Political poetry; Spiritual literature
- Form: Long poem
- Meter: Free verse
- Rhyme scheme: Free verse
- Publisher: Jerusalem: Bialik Institute
- Publication date: 2007 (2nd ed.: 2008)
- Pages: 616
- ISBN: 9789653429239
- OCLC: 232688735

At the Hub (Hebrew: בַּעֲבִי הַשִּׁיר: מבחר שירים, tr. Ba-'avi ha-shir: Mivhar shirim) is a lengthy 2007 Hebrew political poem written by Uri Zvi Greenberg and edited by Dan Miron and Greenberg's widow Aliza Greenberg–Tur-Malka. Its publishing was made possible with the help of the Menachem Begin Heritage Center, the Israeli Ministry of Education, the Israeli Ministry of Culture and Sport, the Yehoshua Rabinovich Foundation for the Arts, Tel Aviv, and, the Mifal HaPais Council for the Culture and Arts.

== Reception ==
Writing for the liberal newspaper Haaretz, Ariel Hirschfeld from Hebrew University of Jerusalem's Hebrew literature department called the poem "one of the highest peaks of Hebrew poetry", and compared Greenberg's work to those of Hayim Nahman Bialik, Shmuel Yosef Agnon, Dahlia Ravikovitch, James Joyce, Dr. Nathan Zach, Franz Kafka, Dr. Yitzhak Laor, W. B. Yeats, William Faulkner, Osip Mandelstam, and, Rainer Maria Rilke, "as, his work is equal to theirs," adding that the poem "is a wellspring of rare beauty and wisdom," and is "the most profound confrontation written in Hebrew with man's breakdown during the 20th century, including the dissolution of European Jewry during World War II, which is man's shattered mirror."

Also writing for Haaretz, critic Dr. Oreet Meital opined that Dr. Miron attempted, via the aforementioned footnotes, to depoliticize Greenberg's poem: "Uri Zvi Greenberg's poetry should not lose, upon moving from the fringes to the mainstream, its provocative, violent, and, paradoxical nature, for, its canonization, especially if done so tendentiously and deliberately, is a castrating mechanism working against the text's subversiveness and against the wild dimension which is part of its magic and essence. Hence, one should be wary of this whitewashing rendering Uri Zvi Greenberg anemic."

Writing for the right-leaning magazine Nativ: A Journal of Politics and the Arts, critic Dr. Yoram Beck underscored that "at a time during which talks of a clash of civilizations are common, Uri Zvi Greenberg's ideas seem relevant more and more, however, we still do not completely understand their implications," for, "Uri Zvi Greenberg's poetry is a poetry of heights, a poetry of a deep soul which demands, both from itself and from others, extraordinary demands, and, one cannot be at the presence of this poetry comfortably. This poetry, first and foremost (surprisingly!), is bestowed by a zest for life — not a hedonistic but an ecstatic one — and, it embraces all layers of life: from the mundane to the historical, from the material to the spiritual, from the erotic to the religious. Uri Zvi Greenberg constructs his poetry out of all of life. This is a poetry of complete freedom, in which the poet allows himself (this is the correct expression) to use all registers, all associations, and, all literary forms, in order to express himself," as, "this is a poetry of loneliness."
