= Hapoel Hatzair =

Israeli socialist group

Hapoel Hatzair הפועל הצעיר
- Founders: A.D. Gordon; Yosef Sprinzak; Yosef Ahronowitz
- Founded: 1905
- Dissolved: 1930
- Merged into: Mapai
- Ideology: Democratic socialism Labor Zionism
- Political position: Left-wing

Hapoel Hatzair (Hebrew: הפועל הצעיר, "The Young Worker") was a Zionist group active in Palestine from 1905 until 1930. It was founded by A.D. Gordon, Yosef Aharonovich, Yosef Sprinzak and followed a non-Marxist, Zionist, socialist agenda. Hapoel Hatzair was a pacifist, anti-militarist group that sought to establish a Jewish foothold in Palestine through manual labor and agricultural settlement.

== History ==
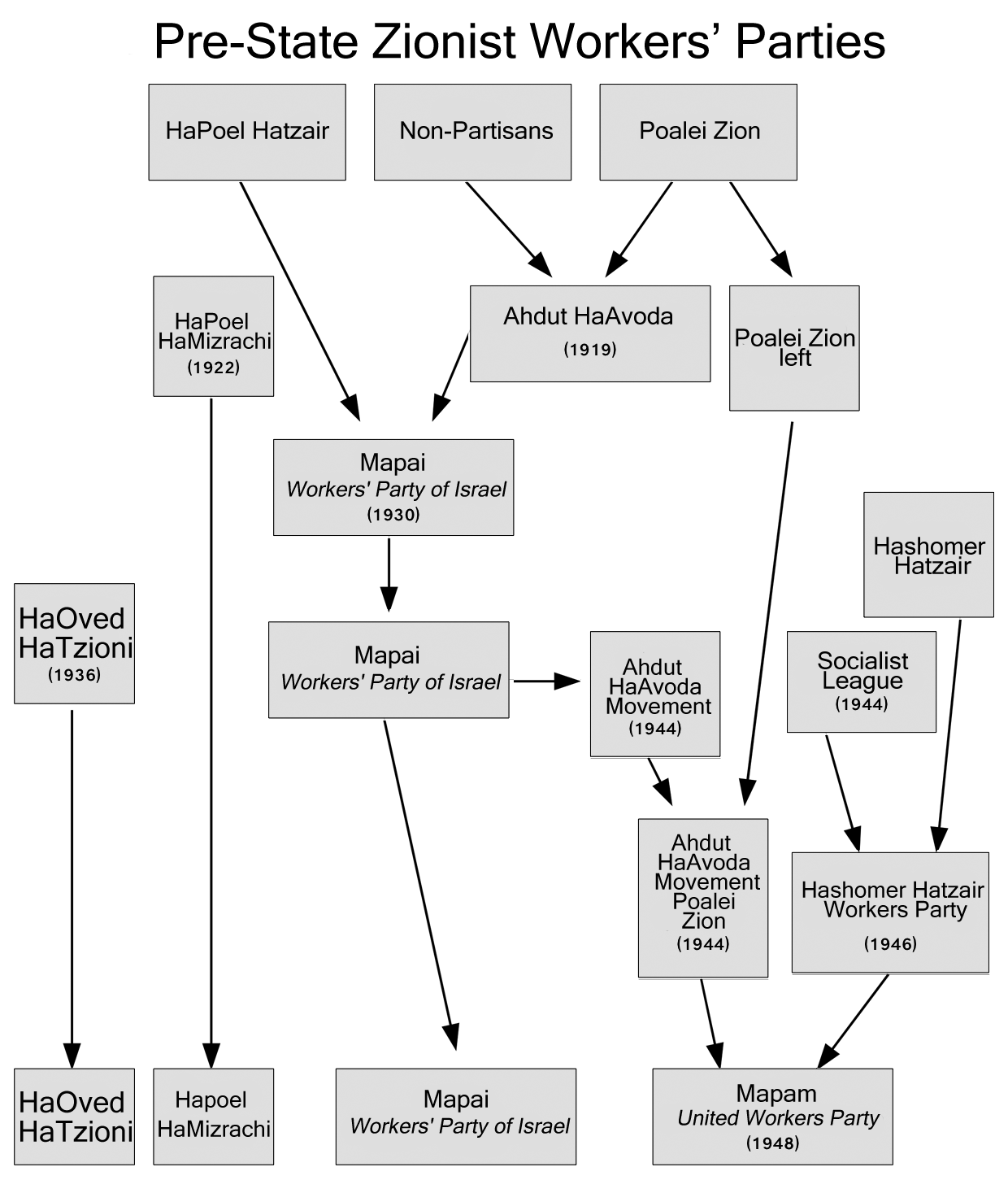
chart of zionist workers parties

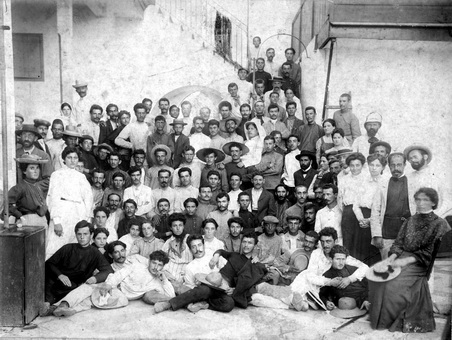
Founding conference of Hapoel Hatzair in Neve Tzedek, 1907

Hapoel Hatzair was formed in 1905 by ten members of the second wave of Jewish immigrants to Palestine, who came between 1904 and 1914. Four of the founders came from Płońsk in the Russian Empire. The new immigrants sought to build a Jewish socialist homeland in Palestine and formed two groups in order to accomplish this: Marxist Poale Zion (Workers of Zion) and Hapoel Hatzair. By 1906, Hapoel Hatzair had grown to 90 members. In 1907, it founded a newspaper of the same name. By 1910, the group had grown, although not to huge numbers. There were only 500 members of Hapoel Hatzair and Poale Zion combined. Hapoel Hatzair's commitment to practical Zionism and the conquest of labour created a group that was dedicated to the creation of new Jewish agricultural communities. Hapoel Hatzair settled land bought from Arab effendis (landowners) by the Jewish National Fund in accordance with socialist principles.

== Competition with Ahdut Ha'Avoda ==
When Ahdut HaAvoda was formed in 1919, Hapoel Hatzair decided not to join, although some members did leave to join Ahdut HaAvoda. Leaders of Hapoel Hatzair felt that the Labor Union, which had strong political ambitions, would dominate any united group and they did not want this to cause them to compromise Hapoel Hatzair's role as the conscience of the labor movement. By not joining Ahdut HaAvoda, Hapoel Hatzair was forced to enter into the urban worker movement. While powerful among agricultural workers, Hapoel Hatzair did not have a large following in the towns; however, they did have a significant following among writers, teachers, and other intellectuals, which although not helpful in the political arena, did bring more prestige to the group.

Over time, members of Hapoel Hatzair and Ahdut HaAvoda realized that they were duplicating work. As both groups existed as a labor group as well as a political party, they had separate employment exchanges, mutual aid organisations, cultural and social clubs, and sickness funds. In 1920, it was suggested that they unite. This led to the formation of the Histadrut, which was a single workers organization to control labor. While these parties had united their labor organizations into the Histadrut, they continued to fight for dominance of this group. In the first election in 1924, Hapoel Hatzair won 27 seats, which was second only to Ahdut HaAvoda, which held 38. While Ahdut HaAvoda was larger, Hapoel Hatzair was more powerful; In 1921 Yosef Sprinzak of Hapoel Hatzair was the first member of the labor movement to be elected to the Zionist Executive.

== Mapai Party ==
By the end of the 1920s, Ahdut HaAvoda, with the help of David Ben-Gurion, had won control of the Histadrut. Economic troubles at the end of the 1920s caused the Histadrut to apply intense pressure to Jewish companies which employed Arabs. Many Jews viewed this as a threat to their livelihood. The Histadrut thus faced opposition and Ben-Gurion saw that a united Histadrut would be more powerful against opposition. He thus united Ahdut HaAvoda and Hapoel Hatzair in December 1930 to create the Mapai party, bringing an end to Hapoel Hatzair. One of the Hapoel Hatzair leaders who joined the senior levels of Mapai was Haim Arlosoroff.

== Women's movement ==
Leading female members of Hapoel Hatzair were among some of the leaders of the Jewish feminist movement. While the only female delegates of the first Histadrut were members of Ahdut HaAvoda, members of Hapoel Hatzair, Ada Fishman-Maimon and Yael Gordon, were invited to attend as guests. While there, Ada Maimon, who was a leader in the struggle for women's suffrage in Jewish institutions, objected to the fact that no delegates to the Histadrut had been chosen by female workers and that they therefore did not represent these women. After gaining support of the leading parties, including her own Hapoel Hatzair, she was granted a position at the Histadrut and two seats were then reserved for delegates who had been elected by women workers themselves.

== Internationally ==
In March 1920, at a congress in Prague, the World Union of Hapoel Hatzair and Zeirei Zion formed Hitahdut Olamit (known as Hitahdut). In 1926, at its Berlin third congress, its name was changed to the World Zionist Labour Party Hitahdut. Its youth movement was named Gordonia, after A. D. Gordon. In 1932, it merged with Poale Zion to create Ihud Olami, the World Union of Zionists-Socialists.
