= Haim Arlosoroff =

Labour Zionist politician in Mandatory Palestine (1899–1933)

- חיים ארלוזורוב
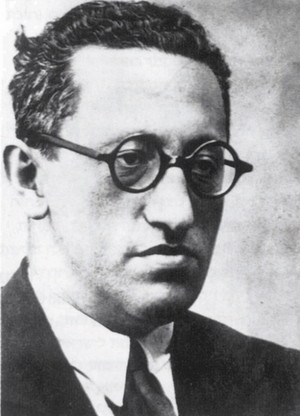
- Born: Vitaly Arlozorov; 23 February 1899; Romny, Russian Empire
- Died: 16 June 1933 (aged 34); Tel Aviv, Mandatory Palestine
- Cause of death: Assassination by gunshot
- Resting place: Trumpeldor Cemetery, Tel Aviv
- Citizenship: Russia
- Education: Frederick William University of Berlin
- Occupations: Economist; writer; political activist
- Political party: Hapoel Hatzair, Mapai
- Spouse(s): Gerda Goldberg (1919–1927); Sima Rubin (1927–1933)
- Children: Shulamit Gurevich (née Arlosoroff; 1919–1997); Shaʾul Arlosoroff (1930–2024)

Haim Arlosoroff (23 February 1899 – 16 June 1933; also known as Chaim Arlozorov; Hebrew: חיים ארלוזורוב) was a Socialist Zionist leader of the Yishuv during the British Mandate for Palestine before the establishment of Israel, and head of the Political Department of the Jewish Agency. In 1933, Arlosoroff was assassinated while walking on the beach with his wife in Tel Aviv.

== Biography ==
Haim Arlosoroff was born on February 23, 1899, into a Jewish family in Romny in the Russian Empire (present-day Ukraine). In Russia, he was known as Vitaly, the Russian equivalent of Haim. When living in Germany, he was known as Viktor. Arlosoroff's paternal grandfather was Rabbi Eliezer Arlosoroff of Romny, an author of religious commentaries on the Talmud.

At age six, Arlosoroff encountered antisemitism for the first time, as the family's home in Romny was attacked in 1905 during a violent pogrom. Arlosoroff's family fled across the German border to East Prussia. Seven years later, the family settled in Königsberg, Germany (now the Russian city of Kaliningrad). Arlosoroff thus became fluent in German, in addition to studying Hebrew with a tutor.

When World War I broke out in 1914, Arlosoroff's family did not possess German citizenship and thus faced threats of deportation as enemy aliens. The family eventually obtained permission to remain in Germany and moved to Berlin. When Arlosoroff's father, Saul, traveled back to Russia on business, he was barred from returning to Germany and died there of cholera.

Arlosoroff earned a doctorate in economics at the University of Berlin. During his studies, he wrote articles on Zionist affairs. In Germany, he became a key leader of Hapoel Hatzair (also Ha-Po'el ha-Tza'ir, Hebrew for "The Young Worker"), a socialist political party that attracted many of the intellectuals of the time. As a result of his party affiliation, Arlosoroff was appointed editor of Die Arbeit (German for "The Labour"), a journal in which his writings were first published.

Arlosoroff was not religiously observant. His precocity and strong national feelings as a Jew can be seen in a letter he wrote at age 17 to his German literature teacher: "I am a Jew, and I feel strong and proud of my Jewishness. I feel it in my bones that I am different from a German, and it would never occur to me to deny this... My soul yearns for the unique, ancient Hebrew culture. But I also like German culture, and perhaps I am also afraid to admit how great my love for it is... Yet, Goethe and Schiller never really touched my heart closely." During his teenage years, Arlosoroff expressed his identity by composing poetry in German that emphasized Jewish cultural themes.

In 1919, Arlosoroff published the treatise "Jewish People's Socialism", his first major written contribution relating to a nationalistic hope for the Jewish people in Eretz Israel. In it, Arlosoroff distanced himself from traditional Marxist beliefs by advocating a new brand of socialism that embraced a national consciousness. He contention was that the Jewish people could preserve and revive their unique cultural identities only within a Jewish national homeland. Arlosoroff further professed that by establishing "Jewish People's Socialism", Jews would be guaranteed public land ownership upon their return to Eretz Israel. In accord with the visions of other socialist Zionists of his time, Arlosoroff believed that ancient Biblical agricultural traditions, such as the "Sabbath Year" and "Year of Jubilee", could be restored alongside institutional parameters established for the new Jewish nation. His treatise accurately foresaw a modern revival of the Hebrew language accompanying the return of Jewish people to Eretz Israel, which linguistically linked many diverse segments of Jewish society.

Arlosoroff first visited Mandatory Palestine in 1921. Shortly after his arrival, the Jaffa Riots broke out. In the midst of Arab rioting, Arlosoroff stood in defence of Neve Shalom, a Jewish settlement adjacent to Tel Aviv and Jaffa. These events shifted his focus to the need for better relations between Jews and Arabs. After the riots, Arlosoroff called upon the Zionist establishment to no longer deny the reality of an Arab national movement in Mandatory Palestine. His plea was not widely accepted, and he received criticism from within the ranks of his own party, Hapoel Hatzair. Arlosoroff ultimately came to the position that strength-based compromise with neighboring Arabs would not weaken or undermine efforts to establish a Jewish national homeland.

== Political career ==
At the 1923 Zionist Congress, Arlosoroff was elected to the Zionist Action Committee. He was 24 years old at the time. Turning down a university position, he left Germany for British Mandatory Palestine in 1924. Arlosoroff was chosen in 1926 to represent the Yishuv at the League of Nations in Geneva.

Arlosoroff's hope for peaceful cooperation and compromise with Arabs was severely tested. In 1929, the consciously aggressive Betar Youth Movement, organized under Ze'ev Jabotinsky's Union of Revisionist Zionists, took part in a coalition to assertively enforce and enlarge a Jewish presence in the proximity of the Western Wall. The activities of Betar and its associates provoked an explosive reaction from the Arab community, in whose perception these activities had dishonored the Muslim holy site on the adjacent Temple Mount. The violent Western Wall Uprisings of 1929 ensued, which resulted in the loss of many lives, including civilians. Instead of inciting further Arab tensions, Arlosoroff strongly criticized the Revisionists for insensitively provoking the animosity.

In 1930, Arlosoroff helped unify the two major Zionist socialist political parties, the Poale Zion and the Hapoel Hatzair, to form the Mapai Labour Party. Through Mapai's political muscle, Arlosoroff was elected as a member of the Zionist Executive at the 1931 Zionist Congress. In addition, he was named Political Director of the Jewish Agency for Palestine, a position he held until his 1933 assassination.

As the Jewish Agency's Political Director, Arlosoroff first believed that the British would support increased Jewish settlement in Mandatory Palestine, so he worked with the governing British Mandatory Administration. Before his tenure as Political Director, he had already familiarized himself with the British system of rule, having written an essay titled "The British Administration and the Jewish National Home". During his years in office, Arlosoroff developed close working relationships with Britain's High Commissioner Sir Arthur Wauchope and British Colonial Secretary Sir Philip Cunliffe-Lister.

Arlosoroff was a close friend of the Jewish scientist and statesman Chaim Weizmann. Weizmann was considered to be among the most politically moderate of Arlosoroff's Mapai Zionist contemporaries.

In a private letter to Weizmann dated June 30, 1932, Arlosoroff wrote candidly of his serious concerns for the future success of the Zionist enterprise in Mandatory Palestine. His correspondence, written in a clearly anguished tone, alerted Weizmann to the possibility that the ability to expand Jewish settlements under the ruling British Administration could completely collapse in a short time under certain circumstances. Arlosoroff predicted that the authority of the British Mandate to govern could quickly come to an end in a few years. In view of this possibility, his letter listed several options he saw as available to the Zionist movement for the potential challenges ahead. He suggested that a Jewish dictatorship be imposed upon the removal of the British Administration from authority, in which a Jewish minority governed over an Arab majority. At no other time in his political career did Arlosoroff ever suggest a proposal this extreme for the establishment of a national home for the Jewish people. There is no record that Weizmann responsded to Arlosoroff’s letter.

In the months leading up to his assassination, Arlosoroff's fervor to help establish a Jewish national homeland intensified. At a January 1933 Mapai Labour Party Council meeting, Arlosoroff clashed with powerful Mapai leaders David Ben-Gurion and Yitzhak Tabenkin over whether Zionists should work within the British government's infrastructure to help bring about Jewish statehood. Arlosoroff warned his colleagues that if the Zionist movement maintained an isolationist policy with the British ruling authorities, Arab political influence would increase within the British Administration and diminish the rights of Jewish people living in the Yishuv.

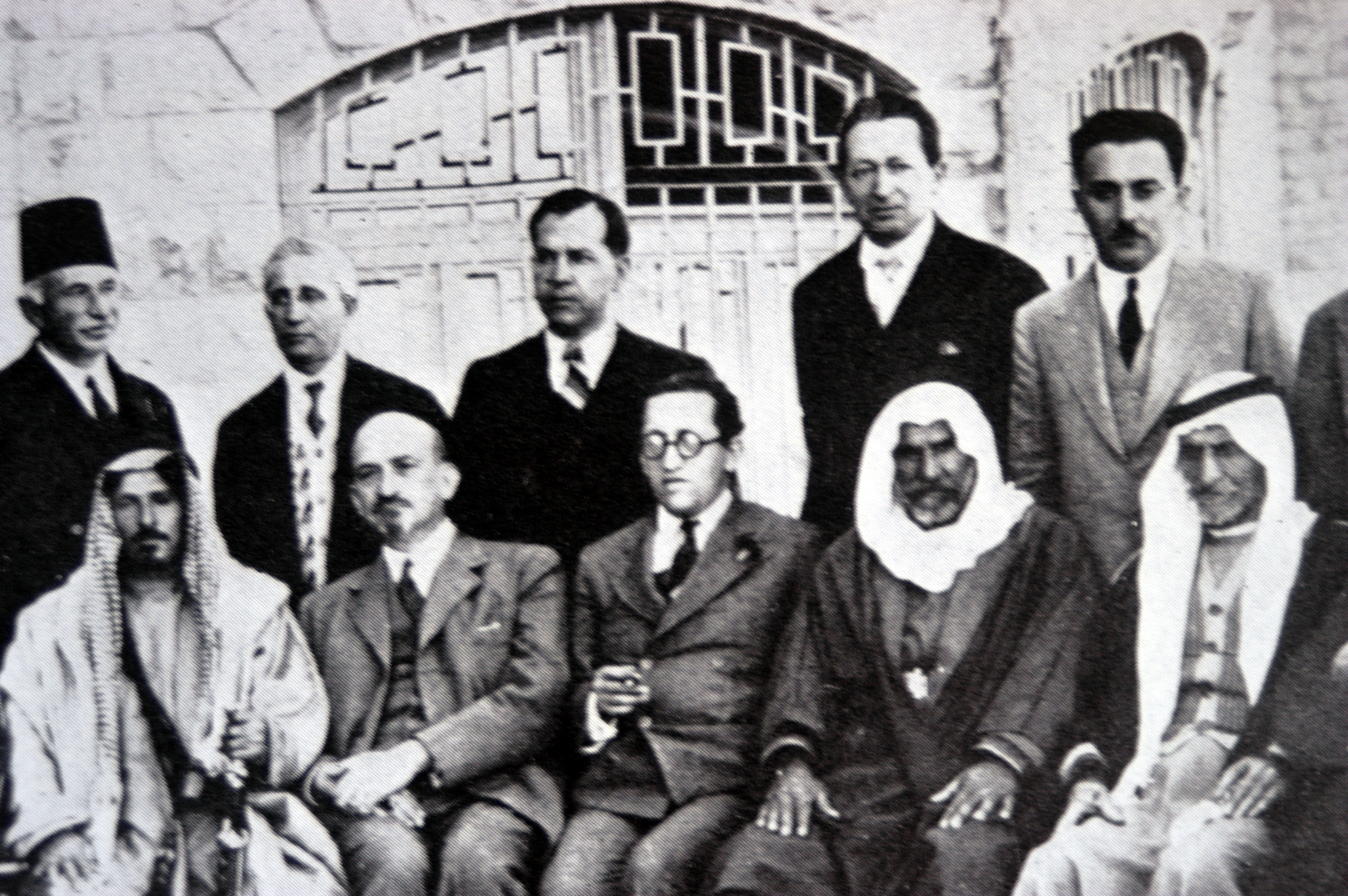
Haim Arlosoroff (sitting, center) at a meeting between Jewish leaders and Transjordanian Arab leaders at the King David Hotel in Jerusalem, 1933. Other Jewish leaders pictured are Chaim Weizmann (sitting, to Arlosoroff's right), Moshe Shertok (Sharett) (standing, right), Yitzhak Ben-Zvi (standing, to Shertok's right), Maurice Hexter, (standing, to Ben-Zvi's right), and Avraham Elmalih (standing, to Hexter's right). Among the Arab leaders pictured is Sheikh Mithqal Al-Fayez, chief of the Beni Sakhr (sitting, left).

On April 8, 1933, Arlosoroff organized a historic event at the King David Hotel in Jerusalem on the Jewish Agency's behalf. The luncheon, attended by Weizmann and prominent Arab leaders of Transjordan, was the first time Jewish Zionists and key Arab leaders gathered together to help promote cooperative efforts between the two groups. Arlosoroff was hopeful that in building an accord with the Arab sheikhs of Transjordan, unpopulated Arab land would be made available for purchase in order to establish new Jewish settlements east of the Jordan River. He also hoped that political relations with Arab leaders of Mandatory Palestine might be enhanced through Zionist interactions with the Transjordanian Arab dignitaries. Not everyone was pleased with Arlosoroff's vision for Jewish/Arab collaboration or the possibility of a bi-nationalistic future in the territories governed under British Mandates. After the luncheon, Arab radicals openly chastised the moderate Arabs who had attended the meeting. Certain Arab leaders in Mandatory Palestine distanced themselves completely from the Transjordanian Arab delegation. Particular anger was directed at Transjordan's Emir Abdullah, the ruler of large territories in Transjordan, who took a leading role in the conciliation efforts. Jewish opposition to the King David Hotel meeting also became apparent as the major party of religious Zionism, Mizrachi, demanded that Arlosoroff resign from his position at the Jewish Agency. Some radicals in the Revisionist movement questioned Arlosoroff's right to be alive.

As a result of Adolf Hitler's rise to power in Germany, Arlosoroff directed his focus to the plight of German Jews. Beginning in March 1933, Jewish groups responded worldwide to Hitler becoming chancellor through protests and boycotts of German products. The Germany Arlosoroff loved growing up changed quickly and drastically when Hitler came to power. In April 1933, the new regime implemented the first of many anti-Jewish laws by terminating all Jewish employees from German government positions. Also at that time, Nazi officials decreed Jewish people were not permitted to leave the country without a specially issued exit visa. Immediately after an organized Nazi boycott of Jewish businesses in Germany on April 1, 1933, Arlosoroff contacted High Commissioner Sir Arthur Wauchope requesting Britain's intervention in the crisis, asking him to consider granting supplementary immigration visas for Mandatory Palestine to Jewish people seeking refuge from Hitler's Reich.

Though Hitler hated Jewish people and wanted them expelled from Germany, in April 1933 the Nazis were unwilling to let a large number of Jewish refugees flee to surrounding nations. According to historian Edwin Black, this was because Reich officials were concerned that fleeing Jewish refugees would lend large numbers to a growing international movement for the economic boycott of Nazi Germany. Hitler's government perceived that organized efforts by Jews to boycott German products on an international basis threatened the newly established Reich. Of additional economic concern to Germany, German financial advisers warned the Nazi government that a mass exodus of Jewish laborers from Germany's workforce would badly damage the Reich's economic stability. The Nazis thus were motivated to find a convenient solution to rid themselves of Jewish people without political or economic backlash.

As German Jewish citizens had been prohibited from fleeing the country, Arlosoroff advocated to the Central Committee of Mapai that a financial trade agreement be negotiated between the Jewish Agency and German Reich officials to help facilitate their rescue and protect their assets. Seeking to overcome strict government restrictions preventing the removal of German capital from the country, he proposed a plan to enable Jewish refugees to emigrate legally from Germany to Mandatory Palestine and salvage some of their property assets in the process. Arlosoroff contended that in the absence of such an agreement Jewish people attempting to flee Nazi persecution would be compelled to seek out illegal methods to remove their assets from Germany, potentially putting their financial resources at risk.

In 1933, Arlosoroff and German Reich officials viewed Mandatory Palestine as a land of opportunity for very different reasons. In the eyes of the Nazi leadership, the remote British-controlled territory appeared to be a "dumping-ground" suitable to isolate thousands of anti-Hitler Jewish refugees from the world's political arena. In addition, a financial agreement with Zionist leaders for the transfer of the refugees would help bolster a German economy adversely affected by anti-Nazi boycotts. For Arlosoroff and other Zionists, the potential mass transfer of Germany's Jews along with their assets to Mandatory Palestine presented a historic opportunity to help guarantee the establishment of a Jewish nation in the ancient ancestral homeland of the Jewish people.

Arlosoroff came to feel that the British could not be trusted and that the Jews must risk angering them to further the goal of building a Jewish state and save the Jews of Europe from the nationalist and authoritarian regimes under which they lived, especially in Nazi Germany.

In his efforts to help Jews escape Hitler, Arlosoroff faced staunch opposition from the Revisionist ranks within his own Zionist movement. Though Mapai Labour leaders attempted to prepare the way for an agreement with Germany by mitigating anti-Nazi sentiment in Zionist circles, Revisionist leader Ze'ev Jabotinsky steadfastly opposed them. In a radio broadcast on April 28, 1933, Jabotinsky strongly condemned any possible pact between Zionism and Hitler. He upheld the Revisionist platform for an international economic boycott on German exports, suggesting in addition that Mandatory Palestine assume the lead in the boycott efforts.

== Ha'avara Agreement ==
As organized efforts to boycott German export products continued to grow internationally, Nazi government authorities perceived the boycott movement to be a serious threat to Germany’s economy. Reich officials hoped to curtail the harmful impact of the anti-Nazi boycotts and invigorate the German financial system by establishing an agreement with Jewish Agency representatives and other parties with shared interests.

In late April 1933, Germany's Consul-General in Mandatory Palestine, Heinrich Wolff, began resolute efforts to work out the details between various parties for what would eventually become the controversial Ha'avara "Transfer" Agreement. At that time, Arlosoroff contacted Consul-General Wolff's office in Jerusalem on the Jewish Agency's behalf to obtain a "letter of introduction" to initiate discussions with Nazi authorities in Berlin. Consul-General Wolff was the most determined among German government officials to work to facilitate a completed transfer accord.

On April 26, 1933, Arlosoroff departed for Nazi Germany on behalf of the Jewish Agency to begin negotiations on the Ha'avara Agreement. The finalized accord, completed in Berlin on August 7, 1933, was put into effect through the efforts of Arlosoroff's successors after his death.

The terms of the Ha'avara pact allowed for the legal emigration of Jewish people from Germany to Mandatory Palestine along with limited assets. The anti-Semitic Nazi regime was eager to encourage Jewish emigration, but they were not willing to allow emigrants to take their property or assets with them, as strict government regulations prohibited the removal of German capital from the country. Via the agreement, Jewish people were required to put their liquidated assets into a special bank account. This money was then used to purchase German goods for export to Mandatory Palestine (and other countries). The proceeds of the sale of these goods were given to the Jewish people on their arrival in Mandatory Palestine. For the Nazis, the agreement helped them by removing unwanted Jewish citizens from Germany while overcoming any attempts at a boycott of German exports (especially from a moral point of view, since it was the Jewish people themselves importing the goods). For the Zionist settlement, the influx of capital gave a much-needed economic boom in the midst of a worldwide depression.

Approximately a year after Arlosoroff's successors and German Reich officials formalized the Ha'avara Agreement, a substantial economic reaction began to take place in Mandatory Palestine. As a result, many Jewish people immigrated. Prior to the Ha'avara Agreement, only several thousand Jewish workers had been immigrating to Mandatory Palestine on a yearly basis. After the agreement was signed, however, over 50,000 new Jewish workers moved to Mandatory Palestine within two years. The Ha'avara Agreement's initial impact on Jewish immigration would be widespread, as approximately 20% of the first 50,000 new Jewish immigrants in Mandatory Palestine came from Germany. By 1936, just three years after the Ha'avara Agreement became effective, the population of Jewish people within Mandatory Palestine had doubled in size. Jewish immigrants from Germany, upon their arrival in Mandatory Palestine, were able to receive back in cash approximately 42% of their original invested funds during the Ha'avara Agreement's early years of implementation.

Public debate and controversy relating to the Ha’avara Agreement did not diminish after the plan initiated operations. In November 1935, the administration of the agreement came under scrutiny, as allegations were made that excessive commissions were being charged on each transfer transaction. Representatives of the Jewish Agency Executive denied the accusation. Administrators of the Ha’avara were also accused at that time of expanding the distribution of German export goods from Mandatory Palestine to Near East countries. Written evidence was discovered that substantiated this claim. Shortly after this controversy came to light, in March 1936 a new organization known as INTRIA(International Trade and Investment Agency Ltd.) was formed to operate in conjunction with the Ha'avara Agreement to distribute German exports beyond Mandatory Palestine.

The Reich's level of cooperation in the Ha'avara Agreement wavered as circumstances changed. Over a period of time, some of Hitler's elite Nazi entourage, including Adolf Eichmann, began to deeply regret Germany's participation in the Ha'avara endeavors. Observers speculated in 1938 that Nazi authorities no longer viewed the agreement as viable to meet the general needs of the German economy. Despite vigorous Nazi Party efforts to interfere with the Ha'avara Agreement's progress, transfer operations continued until the beginning of World War II in 1939.

Ultimately, an estimated 60,000 German Jews escaped persecution by the Nazis directly or indirectly through the Ha'avara Agreement. In addition, the Ha'avara Agreement transferred approximately $100 million to the Yishuv within Mandatory Palestine, which helped establish an industrial infrastructure for what would eventually become the modern Jewish State. Ha'avara Agreement funds were also used for the purchase of land and the development of many new Jewish settlements.

== Assassination ==
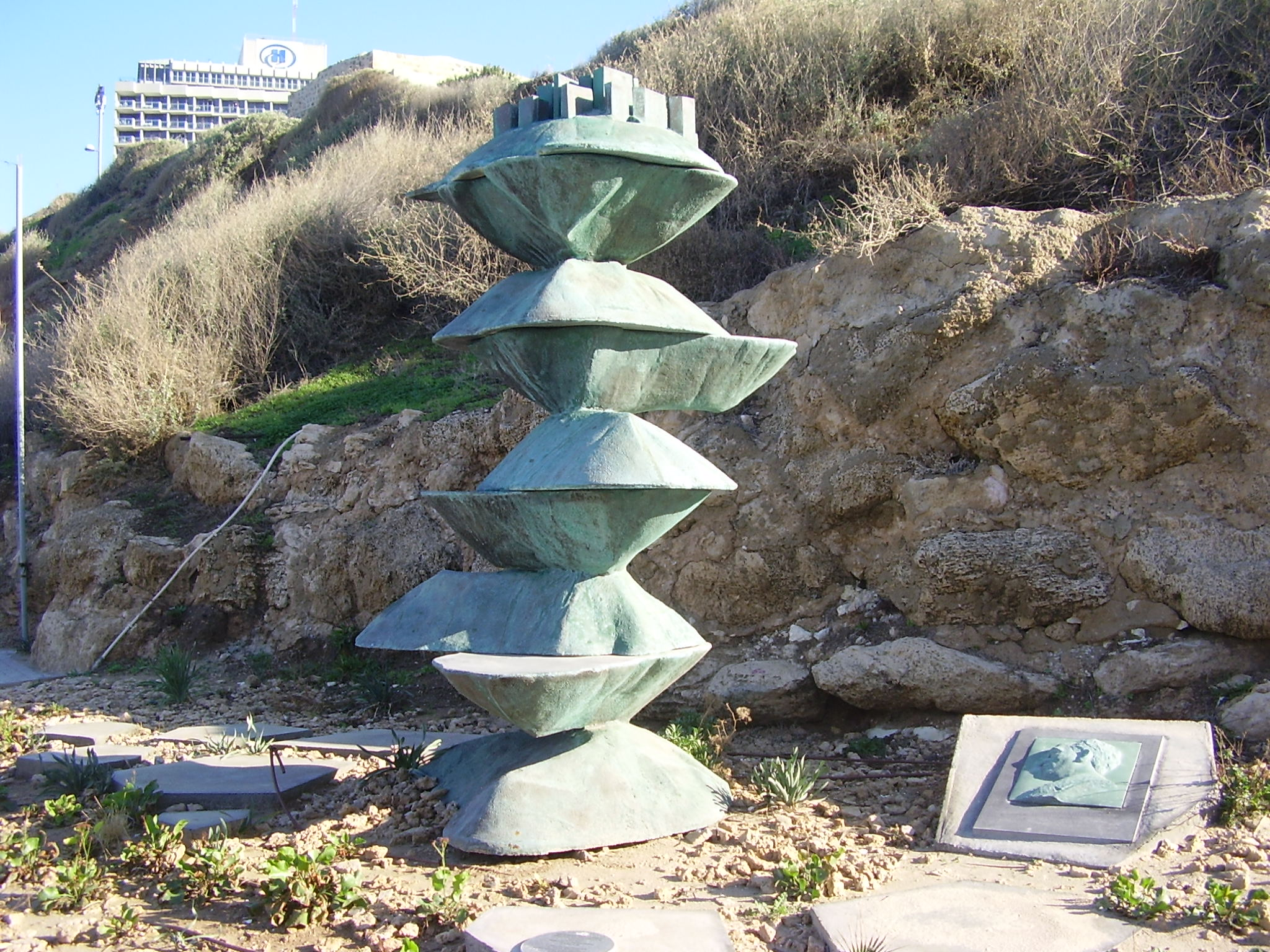
The Arlosoroff Memorial, at the location of his murder, on Tel Aviv Promenade

On 16 June 1933, two days after his return from negotiations in Germany, Haim Arlosoroff was murdered. He was killed by gunshot while walking with his wife, Sima, on the beach in Tel Aviv. Arlosoroff's funeral was the largest in the history of Mandatory Palestine, with an estimated 70,000 to 100,000 mourners. Arlosoroff's death greatly aggravated political relations within the Zionist movement.

Abba Ahimeir, the head of Brit HaBirionim, an activist group with fascist tendencies, was charged by the Palestine Police Force with plotting the assassination. He was also a leader of the nationalist Zionist Revisionist faction, whose publication "Hazit HaAm" continuously attacked the Labor movement and Zionist leaders, including Arlosoroff, often using inflammatory language. On the day of the murder, Ahimeir's newspaper published an article highly critical of Arlosoroff's negotiations with Nazi Germany, stating that the Jewish people "will know today how to react to this crime". Two rank-and-file Revisionists, Abraham Stavsky and Ze'evi Rosenblatt, were arrested as the accused assassins and identified by Arlosoroff's widow. All three men vehemently denied the accusation.

The Criminal Court of Assizes in Mandatory Palestine acquitted Ahimeir and Rosenblatt, but convicted Stavsky, sentencing him to death. Upon Stavsky's appeal to the Palestine Court of Appeal, the murder conviction was overturned due to a lack of corroborating evidence, as the law then required. Stavsky's defense accused the police of manipulating the widow's testimony and other evidence for political reasons, and expounded the theory that the murder was connected to an intended sexual attack on Sima Arlosoroff by two young Palestinians. Stavsky later rose within Irgun ranks. He was responsible for procuring the Irgun arms vessel sunk by the newly established Israel Defense Forces in the "Altalena Affair" on the beach of Tel Aviv, where he died.

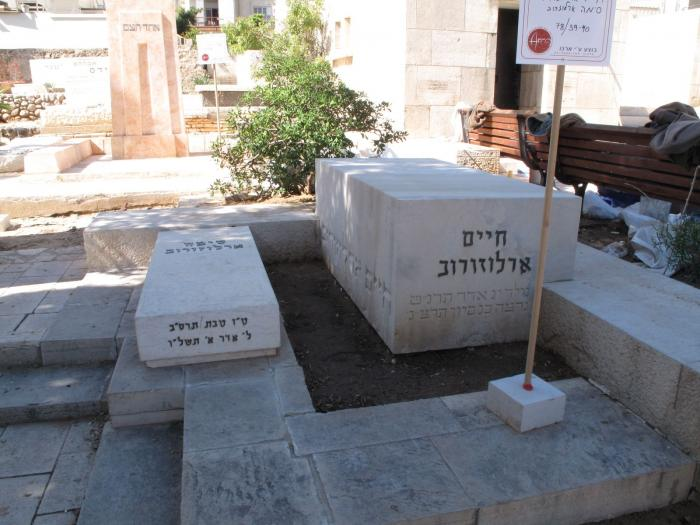
Arlosoroff's grave in Trumpeldor Cemetery, Tel Aviv

In addition to the aforementioned theories, some hold that Arlosoroff's murder was connected to the Soviet and Nazi regimes. The theory of Soviet involvement was promoted by Shmuel Dothan in 1991. He maintained that the Russians took action against Arlosoroff to prevent what they perceived to be a global military plot against them.

Fifty years after the murder, following the publication of a book on the assassination by Shabtai Teveth in 1982, the Israeli government, under the leadership of Prime Minister Menachem Begin, established a formal Judicial Commission of Enquiry to reinvestigate Arlosoroff's death. As the first Israeli Prime Minister elected from the Revisionist movement, Begin initiated the investigation after having taken offence at a suggestion in Teveth's book that a Revisionist acquitted in court for Arlosoroff's murder may have actually been responsible for it. Despite a thorough review of all the available evidence, the Commission's Report released in 1985 stated that the murderers' identities could not be conclusively determined. But the Commission did fully exonerate Ahimeir, Rosenblatt, and Stavsky from all suspicion in Arlosoroff's death.

== Legacy and commemoration ==
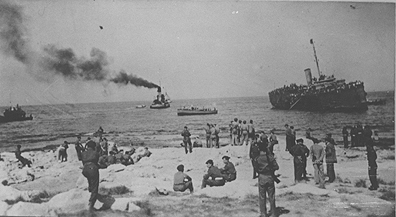
The immigrant ship, Haim Arlosoroff (right), aground off Bat Galim, Mandatory Palestine in 1947

Arlosoroff is buried at the Trumpeldor Cemetery in Tel Aviv. His memory is honored by the many streets named after him throughout the towns of Israel and in the names of several places in Israel:Kiryat Haim, a large neighborhood of Haifa, Giv'at Haim, a kibutz and Kfar Haim, a moshav.

A bronze monument dedicated to Arlosoroff's legacy stands at the Tel Aviv shoreline promenade where he was fatally wounded.

The "Arlosoroff House", which Arlosoroff visited on the day he was assassinated, stands in honor of his memory at Ben Shemen Youth Village, adjacent to the Ben Shemen Moshav in Central Israel.

Arlosoroff's name was also used for a ship carrying Jewish refugees to Mandatory Palestine, the former USCGC Unalga (WPG-53). On 27 February 1947, the Haim Arlosoroff (1,378 passengers from Sweden and Italy) was intercepted by British Royal Navy destroyer HMS Chieftain, and the passengers put up fierce resistance. The ship ran aground at Bat Galim south of Haifa, just opposite a British Army camp. The crew and passengers were arrested and deported to Cyprus.

== See also ==
- List of unsolved deaths
- Magda Goebbels, a childhood friend of Arlosoroff, later notable as the wife of Joseph Goebbels, the Third Reich's Propaganda Minister.
