= Political views of Subhas Chandra Bose =

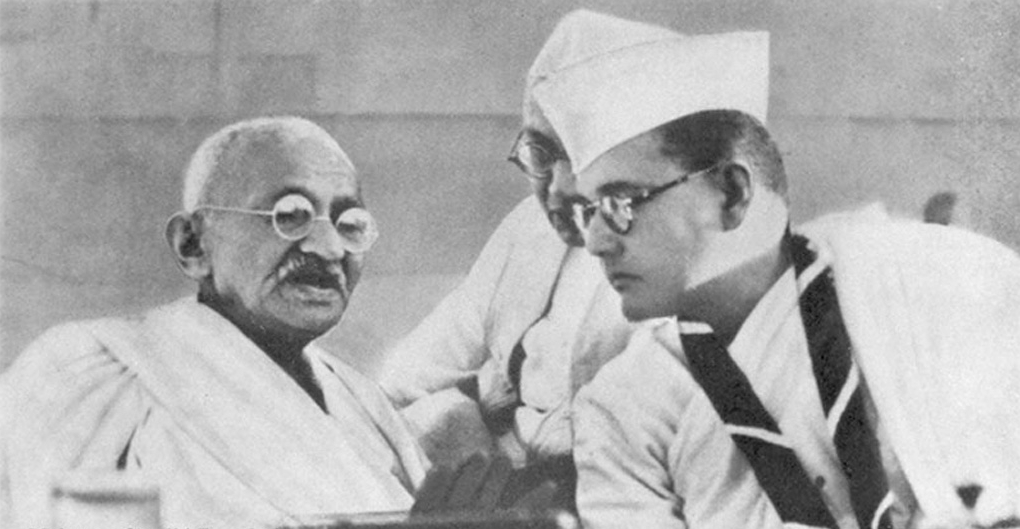
Bose with Gandhi in 1938

Subhas Chandra Bose (23 January 1897 – 18 August 1945), a leader of the Indian independence movement, is still widely respected in India, but perhaps best known in the west for his alignment with the Axis Powers during World War II. Upon Bose's death, Mahatma Gandhi described him as "undoubtedly a patriot, though misguided." His ideological positions were ultimately defined by fervent Indian nationalism and the desire for complete independence for India (as opposed to the gradualism which defined the Indian National Congress for much of his lifetime). From a young age, he found inspiration in Indian writings and thinkers such as the Bhagavad Gita and Swami Vivekananda and expressed openness to socialism. After 1930, he became a proponent of "a synthesis of what modern Europe calls socialism and fascism", which he termed Samyavada. He would gradually shift towards this form of National Socialism adapted to the Indian context, although he would vacillate with Soviet communism and Indian nationalism.

== Gandhi and Bose ==
Although Bose and Mohandas K. Gandhi had differing ideologies, the latter called Bose the "Patriot of Patriots" in 1942. Bose admired Mohandas Karamchand Gandhi and called him Bapu, recognising his importance as a symbol of Indian nationalism and giving him political expediency as told by Bose to Rash Behari Bose; called him "The Father of Our Nation" in a radio broadcast from Rangoon in 1944, in which he stated, "I am convinced that if we do desire freedom we must be prepared to wade through blood", a statement at odds with Gandhi's philosophy of non-violence. Thus, although they shared the goal of an independent India, by 1939 the two had become divided over the strategy to achieve Indian Independence, and to some degree the form which the post-Independence state should take: Gandhi was hostile to industrialisation, while Bose saw it as the only route to making India strong and self-sufficient (in this he may have been influenced, like many other Indian intellectuals of the time, by reports of the success of the Soviet Five-year plans). Jawaharlal Nehru disagreed with Gandhi on this point as well, though not over the tactics of protest.

During the mid-1930s Bose travelled in Europe, visiting Indian students and European politicians, including Benito Mussolini. In this period, he also researched and wrote the first part of his book The Indian Struggle. The book contains Bose's evaluation of Gandhi's role and contribution to the independence struggle, his own vision for an Independent India and his approach to politics. In the book, Bose was critical of Gandhi, accusing the Mahatma of being too soft and almost naive in his dealings with the colonial regime and who with his status quoism had become "the best policeman the Britisher had in India". Bose also predicted a left-wing revolt in the Indian National Congress that would give rise to a new political party with a "clear ideology, program and plan of action" that would among other things "stand for the interests of the masses", advocate the complete independence of the Indian people, advocate a federal India with a strong central government and support land reforms, state planning and a system of Panchayats.

== Bose and Germany ==
Bose was accused of collaborating with the Axis, after he fled to Germany in 1941 and offered Hitler an alliance. He criticized the British during World War II, saying that while Britain was fighting for the freedom of the European nations under Nazi control, it would not grant independence to its own colonies, including India. In 1937 he published an article attacking Japanese imperialism in the Far East, although he betrayed some admiration for other aspects of the Japanese regime.

Bose's earlier correspondence (prior to 1939) also reflects his deep disapproval of the racist practices of and annulment of democratic institutions in Nazi Germany. He also, however, expressed admiration for the authoritarian methods (though not the racial ideologies) which he saw in Italy and Germany during the 1930s, and thought they could be used in building an independent India. Nevertheless, Bose's tenure as Congress Party President (1938–39) did not reflect any particular anti-democratic or authoritarian attributes. Nirad C. Chaudhuri, Anton Pelinka and Leonard Gordon have remarked that Bose's skills were best illustrated at the negotiating table, rather than on the battlefield.

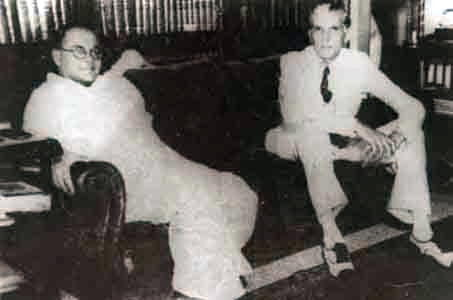
Subhash Chandra Bose and Muhammed Ali Jinnah of the Muslim League seen here together

At the Tripura Congress session of 1939, he demanded giving the British Government a six-month deadline for granting independence and of launching a mass civil disobedience movement if it failed to do so. He believed that "... the country was internally more ripe for a revolution than ever before and that the coming international crisis would give India an opportunity for achieving her emancipation, which is rare in human history."

== Bose and Japan ==
Bose's judgment in allying with the Japanese has been questioned, as many argue that he would have been unable to ensure an independent India had he ridden to power on Japanese bayonets, and was in danger of becoming a puppet ruler similar to the fate that befell Puyi, the last Chinese Emperor of Manchuria. In 1943 Rash Behari Bose had urged this on him during his last visit to Subhas Bose in Singapore, pointing out that the Japanese had claimed right of conquest in Manchuria and would do so in India, while Quit India had shown that this would not be accepted by the Indian Nation.

Nevertheless, given the Indian National Army's (INA) overwhelming dependence on Japanese military support, he would have been in a weak position. Bose also seems to have ignored the appalling treatment meted out by the Japanese to the Asian inhabitants of the lands they conquered as part of the Greater East Asian Co-prosperity sphere, which included the forcible recruitment of labour from the overseas Indian population to build projects such as the Burma Railway, and massacres of Malayan Chinese in Singapore where he spent most of the war.

Bose has been branded as a fascist in some quarters. Others believe that Bose had clearly expressed his belief that democracy was the best option for India.

Had either of the alliances he forged during the war resulted in Indian independence in the manner he envisaged, it would have been at the cost of an Allied defeat in the Second World War, a price that some Indians would argue is too high: Gandhi himself, in the immediate aftermath of the war, said that Bose had been "foolish in imagining, that by allying himself with the Japanese and the Germans, who were not only aggressive Powers, but also dangerous Powers, he could get Indian freedom". The alternative of non-violent protest within India espoused by Gandhi and the rest of Congress ultimately led to British withdrawal, albeit at the expense of the partition of the country along communal lines. Even before 1939, Congress had secured political concessions from the British in the form of elected provincial assemblies, and an agreement that the British taxpayer would foot the bill for Indian re-armament. Although it was rejected by Congress at the time, the 1942 Cripps mission's offer of full independence after the war could be considered the point at which the British departure became inevitable. Britain's weakness after the war, and domestic political pressure on the Labour Government also made British withdrawal more likely. Publicly at least, Bose never believed that this would happen unless they were driven out by force: as late as 1944, three years prior to independence, he announced that "I am honestly convinced that the British Government will never recognise India's demand for independence."

Nirad Chaudhuri considered it a backhanded tribute to Bose that the Congress tricolour and the Muslim League green flag flew together for the last time during the mutiny of the Indian navy in Bombay unleashed in 1946 partly at anger within the Navy at the trial of INA officers by the British.

Judith Brown argues that the Mutiny of the Indian Navy was a minor factor in the British decision to leave compared to domestic political pressure, American hostility to any continuation of the Raj, and the breakdown of almost all networks of support and collaboration brought about by thirty years of Congress agitation. By 1946 over 50% of the members of the Indian Civil Service were Indians, and even Churchill recognised that the offer of independence made by the Cripps Mission in 1942 could not now be withdrawn. In this interpretation concerns over the loyalty of the military were only one factor among many amid the general breakdown in authority: nor, it could be argued, did all this necessarily stem from the activities of Bose and the INA. The prospect of communalism infecting the armed forces worried the British just as much.

Bose was considered a patriot even by some of his rivals in the Congress. Gandhi himself wrote that Bose's "... patriotism is second to none", and he was moved to proclaim after Bose's death that he was a "prince among patriots"—a reference, in particular, to Bose's achievement in integrating women and men from all the regions and religions of India in the Indian National Army. Bose wanted freedom for India at the earliest opportunity, and to some extent, he didn't care who he had to approach for assistance.
