= Brit HaBirionim =

Brit HaBirionim ברית הבריונים
- Historical leaders: Abba Ahimeir; Uri Zvi Greenberg; Yehoshua Yeivin
- Founded: 1930
- Dissolved: 1933
- Headquarters: Jerusalem
- Ideology: Revisionist Maximalism
- Political position: Far-right
- Religion: Judaism
- Colors: Black (official); Blue (informal)

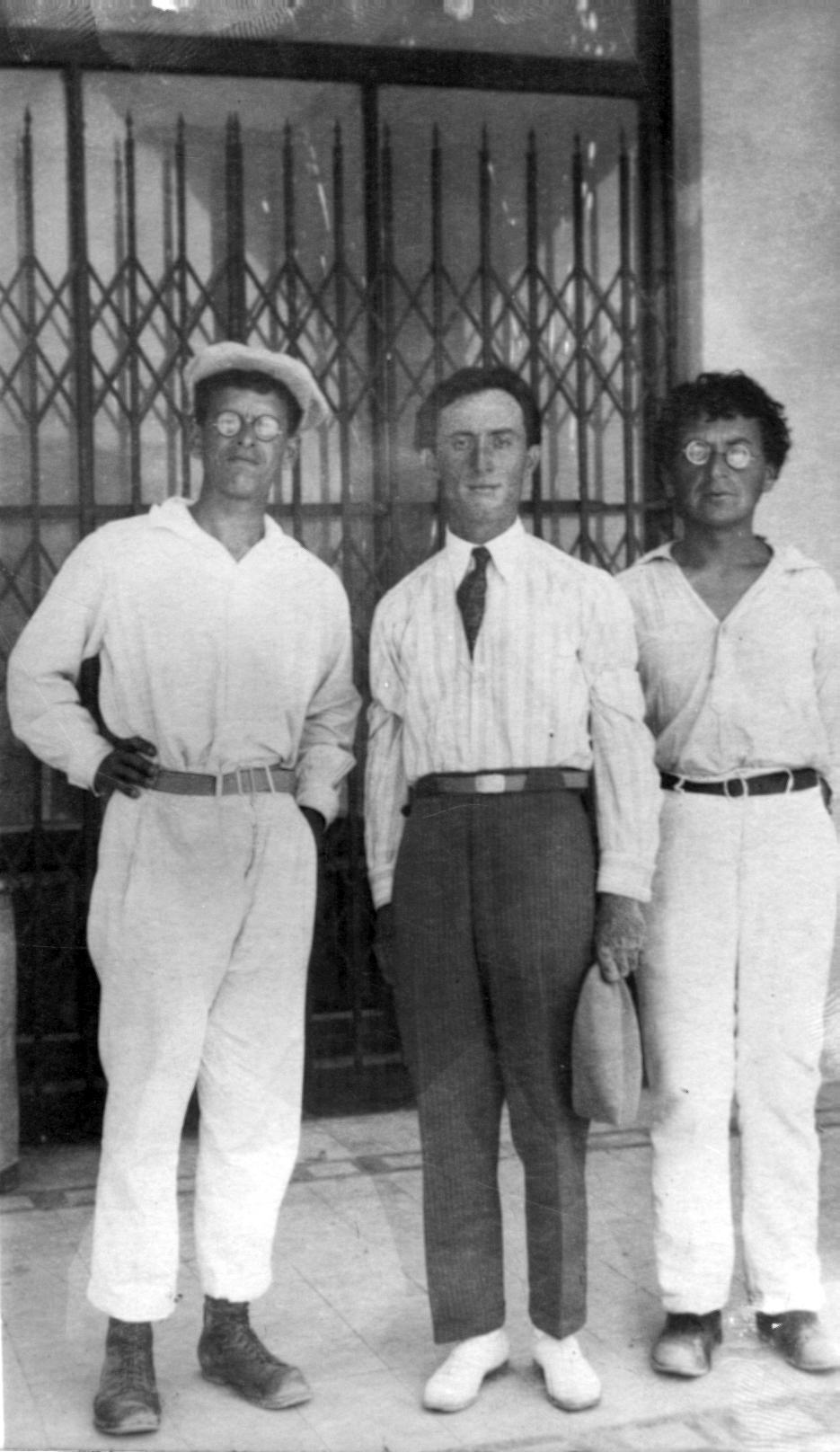
Abba Ahimeir, Uri Zvi Greenberg, and Yehoshua Yeivin.

Brit HaBirionim (Hebrew: ברית הבריונים, variously translated as The Strongmen Alliance, Alliance of the Hoodlums, and The Covenant of the Outlaws) was a clandestine, self-declared fascist faction of the Revisionist Zionism movement in Mandatory Palestine, active between 1930 and 1933. It was founded by Abba Ahimeir, Uri Zvi Greenberg and Yehoshua Yeivin.

== History ==
The 1929 Palestine riots and the Haganah's inability to successfully prevent the 1929 Hebron and Safed massacres led to the creation of the first militant organization characterized by its complete disassociation from the existing Zionist establishment. Brit HaBirionim was founded in October 1930 and was right-wing and nationalist in its orientation in contrast to the Labor Zionism majority.

== Ideology ==
The organization's ideology was Revisionist Maximalism, which was modelled upon Italian Fascism; Ahimeir suggested that Ze'ev Jabotinsky be referred to as 'duce'. The group also was influenced by the ancient Jewish Sicarii insurgents.

Brit HaBirionim was part of the Zionist Revisionist movement. Its formerly socialist members primarily targeted the British and other Zionists rather than Arabs. It sought to create an integralist nationalism among Jews. It looked unfavorably upon liberal Zionists for only being for middle-class Jews rather than all Jews, including the poor. In 1932, Ahimeir also called for

- the creation of an independent Zionist federation;
- a "war on funds" to end corruption in the Zionist movement;
- a war on anti-Semitism. The movement's motto was "conquer or die".

== Operations ==
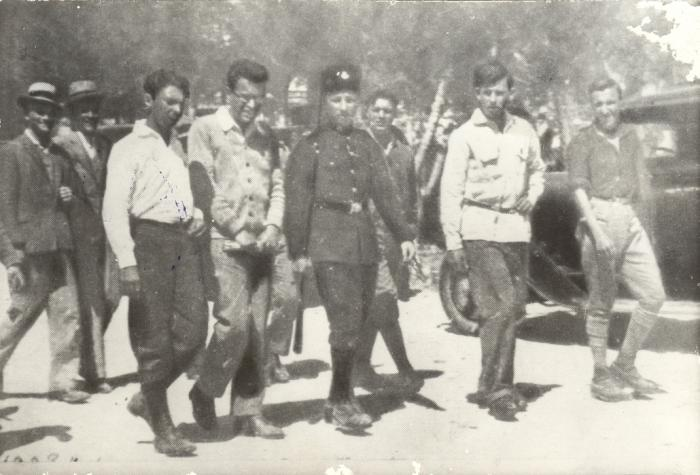
Abba Ahimeir (handcuffed) being brought to court in Jerusalem.

Members of Brit HaBirionim carried out several "minor operations", including demonstrations against the British, interfering with British census takers, removing the Nazi flag from two German consulates, and other activities that would now be considered religious freedom but at the time were forbidden for Jews, e.g. blowing the Shofar at the Western Wall in celebration of Rosh Hashanah.

The British Mandatory Authority arrested Ahimeir in 1933 for the murder of Chaim Arlosoroff. He was fully acquitted of the charges in 1934, by which time the group had dissolved.

Some of the group, such as Gershon Schatz, became members of Irgun and Lehi.

== See also ==
- Assassination of Haim Arlosoroff
