= Hazit HaAm =

Revisionist Zionist weekly newspaper (1932–1934)

- Type: Weekly newspaper
- Founder: Yehoshua Lichter
- Founded: 1931
- Ceased publication: 1934
- Political alignment: Revisionist Maximalism
- Language: Hebrew
- Country: Mandatory Palestine

Hazit HaAm (Hebrew: חזית העם, lit. Front of the People) was a weekly newspaper associated with Revisionist Maximalism published in Palestine between January 1932 and June 1934.

The paper was established in 1931 by Yehoshua Lichter.

The newspaper is noted for its tolerant or even supportive attitude towards some aspects of Nazi ideology. When Adolf Hitler rose to power in 1933, it stated that "If some segments of our people draw the appropriate conclusions from the Hitlerism [sic], then we will be able to say that something good came out of a bad situation." The newspaper also approved of Hitler's anti-communism, stating that "the anti-Semitic husk should be discarded, but not its anti-Marxist inside." The praise of Nazism reportedly stopped after leading Revisionist thinker Ze'ev Jabotinsky called for "a total end to this abomination."
