= Abraham Stavsky =

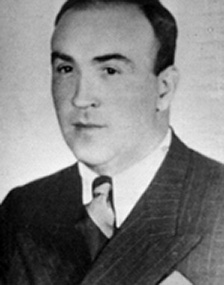
Avraham Stavsky

Abraham Stavsky (Hebrew: אברהם סטבסקי; January 5, 1906 – June 22, 1948) was an activist member of Betar, the youth movement of a Revisionist Zionist group founded by Ze'ev Jabotinsky.

On June 18, 1933, Stavsky was arrested by the British Mandate police as a suspect in the June 16, 1933, murder of Chaim Arlosoroff, a prominent Labor Zionist leader. Arlosoroff's widow, who had witnessed the murder, identified him as an accomplice who had held a torch for the murderers. Stavsky was convicted on June 8, 1934, and sentenced to death. There was controversy regarding the accuracy of the charge and righteousness of the conviction among the Jewish public; an outspoken supporter of Stavsky was the Chief Rabbi of Palestine, Rav Kook. His conviction was overturned on a technicality by the highest British Court of Appeals in Palestine in 1934, as Palestinian law required that Mrs. Arlosoroff's testimony had to be supported by another witness. The appeal court stated that "had the case been heard in England itself, or in most of the territories of the British Empire, the conviction would rightly have been upheld." Later Israeli investigations into the murder disagreed with the court's assessment and concluded that Stavsky was innocent.

Stavsky went on to work with the Irgun in smuggling thousands of Jews out of Europe during the Holocaust. He died on the beached Altalena in the midst of exploding onboard munitions during heavy machine gun exchange with Haganah forces. Ironically, Stavsky died 50 yards from the very spot where Chaim Arlosoroff was murdered 15 years and 5 days earlier.

== See also ==
- Assassination of Haim Arlosoroff
