= Assassination of Haim Arlosoroff =

1933 murder in Jaffa, Mandatory Palestine

Haim Arlosoroff
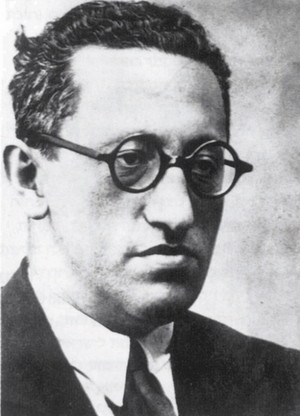
- Born: 23 February 1899; Romny, Russian Empire
- Died: June 13, 1933 (aged 34); Jaffa, Mandatory Palestine
- Cause of death: Assassination by gunshot
- Occupation: Zionist politician
- Known for: Victim of unsolved murder
- Spouse: Sima Arlosoroff

Haim Arlosoroff was assassinated on the night of Friday, June 16, 1933, as the left-wing Zionist leader was walking with his wife on the beach in Tel Aviv, Mandatory Palestine. The assassination was initially believed to be carried out by his right-wing political enemies; the subsequent court case ended in acquittal for the two accused of the crime. The conviction and death sentence of a third accused was overturned on appeal to the Palestine Court of Appeal. The case has never been definitively solved.

== Political background ==
At the time of the murder, the two primary opposing Zionist political parties in Palestine were the mainstream Mapai, the left-wing Socialist party, and the opposing Revisionists, the right-wing nationalist party. The rift between the two sects evolved with the end of World War I and the ensuing British colonization of Palestine. Globally represented by the World Zionist Organization and by the Jewish Yishuv within domestic Palestine, Mapai, led by David Ben-Gurion, encouraged mass Jewish immigration and continuous settling of the land. Its leadership found it essential to cooperate with the ruling British Mandate of Palestine. Adhering to a code of practical Zionism, the official position of the Zionist leadership found it vital to develop the physical land in order to stake a claim over it. The Revisionists, led by Vladimir (Ze’ev) Jabotinsky, relied on the principles of political Zionism. They saw it imperative to gain total control over the country before devoting power toward its material improvement. It promoted procurement of independence from the English Mandate as the sole means for reestablishing a Jewish homeland.

Charging Mapai leaders with prejudices against non-adherents, the dissonance between the two groups sounded louder and more pronounced. The rift reached a climax when Mapai showed interest in negotiations with the Nazi government over German Jews' expedited immigration to Palestine. These negotiations were spearheaded by Arlosoroff, and he was in Germany regarding this matter the week before his murder. The Revisionists, especially its secret radical branch, Brit Habiryonim, expressed extreme criticism in Mapai's willingness to confer with the Nazi government over German Jews' expedited emigration to Palestine.

== List of characters ==
=== Haim Arlosoroff ===
Zionist ideologue and activist. Born in 1899 in Romny, Ukraine (then part of the Russian Empire), he took pride in his Jewish identity at an early age, despite his family's assimilationist views. A Socialist Zionist, he was a leader in the German branch of Hapoel Hatzair, and edited its print periodical. In 1924, he moved to Palestine; two years later, he was a Jewish Palestinian representative at the League of Nations conference. In 1930, he helped merge his own Hapoel Hatzair party with the Poale Zion party, thus forming a new Labor party called Mapai. At the time of his murder, he was the head of the political department of the Jewish Agency in Palestine. Throughout his lifetime, he wrote several treatises and essays on the topics of socialist Zionism and Jewish presence in Palestine.

=== Avraham Stavsky ===
Suspect number 1, he was believed to have shined a flashlight into the eyes of Arlosoroff seconds before suspect number 2 fatally shot him. Born in Brisk, Poland in 1906, in 1927 he joined Beitar, the youth branch of the political Zionist Revisionist movement. In the fall of 1932, he heard Abba Ahimeir, one of the leaders of the violent faction Brit Habiryonim, speak in Warsaw. When he moved to Palestine in March 1933, Ahimeir took him under his wing.

=== Ze'ev Rosenblatt ===
Suspect number 2, he was believed to have fatally shot Arlosoroff. Born in Chernivtsi, Bukovina in 1911, he was the local Beitar officer. When he moved to Palestine in the 1920s, he became a member of the secretariat of the Kfar Saba branch of Beitar.

=== Abba Ahimeir ===
Suspected with aiding and abetting the murder. Born in 1897 in White Russia, he emigrated to Palestine in 1912. He was first a member of HaPoel Hatzair, Arlosoroff's own Labor Zionist movement. He later became disillusioned, and in 1928 co-formed the rival Fascia-nationalist Revisionist faction with Uri Zvi Greenberg and Dr. Yehoshua Heschel Yaivin. He was the editor-in-chief of the party's newspaper, Hazit HaAm. In 1932, he co-founded Brit Habiryonim, a secret Revisionist branch devoted to taking more violent methods against the British.

=== Sima Arlosoroff ===
Wife of Arlosoroff. Was walking on the beach with him when he was killed. She was the only witness to his murder, and it was on her testimony that the case was built.

=== Abdul Majud el Buhri ===
An Arab mechanic from Jaffa. In January 1934, while incarcerated in the Jerusalem Municipal jail on a murder charge, he admitted to the killing of Arlosoroff, with an accomplice. He later confessed that his first admission was a ruse, and that Stavsky and Rosenblatt had offered him money for assuming responsibility.

=== Hanoch Kalai ===
A defense witness, Kalai (then still known as Hanoch Strelitz) testified that he and Rosenblatt were at a Beitar meeting together in Kfar Saba at the time of the assassination. Irgun commander of Kfar Saba and Herzliya, Kalai lied under oath about being a member of the group. He would later become Commander in Chief of Irgun and a co-founder of Lehi.

== Event ==
On June 14, 1933, two days before his murder, Arlosoroff returned home from a weeks-long work-related trip to Europe. The most important part was his meeting with Nazi officials in an effort to negotiate details of German Jews' property transfer to Palestine. While viewed by Mapai as a valuable measure to insure the assets of these Jews, this negotiation was hotly contested by the Revisionists, who believed that under no circumstances should deals be made with the Nazis.

On the morning of the day of his murder, June 16, Arlosoroff was in Jerusalem on business. He spent the morning at the offices of the Jewish Agency. Sima was meant to meet him there in the early afternoon, upon which they would return home to Tel Aviv. Sima was supposed to make plans as to their weekend activity; the couple wanted to get away from the city for a few days. When she arrived at the Agency, Arlosoroff told her that he would return home by himself later in the afternoon.

When Arlosoroff came home at 5:15 pm, the couple decided to stay in Tel Aviv for that night. At 8:30 pm they ate dinner at the beachfront Kaete Dan hotel. At 9:30 pm they finished dinner and went for a walk on the beach.

They walked North, towards the Yarkon River. According to Sima, at a certain point she felt that they were being followed by two men. Arlosoroff brushed off her worry, and they continued walking. When they got to the end of the shoreline, they turned back. They saw the two men whom Sima had been afraid of earlier, and let them pass by in front of them. Sima was closer to the sea; Arlosoroff was closer to the city.

At 10 pm, the couple approached the two men. The bigger of the two suddenly shone a flashlight in Arlosoroff's face, and asked him for the time. Arlosoroff responded that they had no right to bother them; the man asked again. In the meantime, the smaller man made what was later described by Sima as an "Oriental gesture" and took out a gun. The larger man turned off his flashlight. The smaller man aimed the gun at Arlosoroff, and fired. He fell to the ground. The two men ran from the scene as Sima called for help.

Three bystanders who heard her cries rushed Arlosoroff to the hospital. After drifting in and out of consciousness for three hours, he died at 12:45 am on Saturday morning, June 17.

== Police blotter ==
The official suspect police blotter appeared in newspapers around the country on Saturday afternoon. It was based on Sima's eyewitness account:

The one who held the flashlight: Suspect Number 1: Male, taller than average, large build, age 30–40, clean-shaven, full face, light-skinned, tough expression, brownish-reddish hair, stands with legs apart, has a duck-like walk. Wearing a dark suit in a European style – black or dark blue – and the stitching may be in a 'double-breasted' style. Collar or long tie. Wearing shoes, speaks without accent.

The one who shot the gun: Suspect Number 2: Male, short, thin, fit body, age 30, dark Oriental type, long nose, unshaven, tough expression, dark hair, wearing a dark suit in a European style with irregular stripes. We think that he is wearing a gray hat and shoes. He makes Oriental movements with his hands.

The police offered 500 liras, and the Jewish Agency offered 1000, to anyone with information on the suspects.

== Police proceedings ==
=== Stavsky ===
As Suspect Number 1: He was arrested in the early morning of Monday, June 19 at his home in Tel Aviv. He denied all charges, claiming that he was in Jerusalem at the night of the murder.

He was suspected by Yitzchak Halutz, a clerk in the Immigration Department in Jerusalem. The week before, Stavsky had applied for an exit visa to return to Poland and recruit more people for the Revisionist party. His petition was denied. On the morning of June 16, he went to the immigration offices in Jerusalem, and spoke with Halutz to ask for his application fee back. The next day, June 17, Halutz saw the police blotter with the description of the two men. Number 1 reminded him of Stavsky, and he immediately contacted the police. He gave them Stavsky's photo which was attached to the exit visa petition. A warrant was put out for Stavsky's arrest.

=== Rosenblatt ===
As Suspect Number 2: He was arrested 37 days after the murder, on July 23, at the Beitar camp in Kfar Saba. He denied all charges, claiming that he was at a party meeting in Kfar Saba the night of the murder.

He was suspected by Rivka Feigin, a member of the Rosenblatt's Beitar group. She told Mapai authorities that she had heard an editor at Hazit Ha'am say with certainty that Number 2 was Rosenblatt. The Mapai leadership went to the police.

=== Achimeir ===
As aiding and abetting the murder suspects: He was arrested during the week following the assassination. He was linked to the murder primarily because of his association with Brit Habiryonim. He was eventually acquitted because there was not enough evidence to take him with which to try him.

== Political reaction ==
=== Mapai ===
Immediately after the murder, Mapai created its own inquiry committee, to help the police in the official investigation. The three primary suspected groups were the Revisionists, the Communists and Arabs. However, many within Mapai – including Ben-Gurion – believed that members of the Revisionists had committed the crime.

=== Revisionists ===
At first, the Revisionists fully denied any involvement. When Stavsky was arrested, instead of defending him, they actually believed his guilt. They tried to distance Stavsky's relationship to them, claiming that he was a Communist at heart and had committed the murder of his own accord. Their official position changed when Jabotinsky defended Stavsky in a party newspaper on July 22. He further denounced Mapai as creating a blood libel against the Revisionists. He said the party was using the murder as a political stepping stool. Some Revisionists later said that Mapai committed the murder itself, in order to blame the opposition.

== Abdul Majud ==
In January 1934, an Arab prisoner from Jaffa, who was being held in the Jerusalem jail for a revenge murder, confessed to the Arlosoroff murder. He claimed that he was Number 1 and that a man named Issa Ibn Darwish was Number 2. He explained that on the night of the murder, he and Issa had gone for a walk on the beach. He had no intention of killing anyone; he did not even know who Arlosoroff was. The third time they passed by the couple Abdul Majud approached Arlosoroff and asked him for the time. When Arlosoroff responded that it was too dark for him to tell, Abdul Majud replied that he had a flashlight, and turned it on. He saw that Arlosoroff was suddenly looking straight ahead; when he turned around, he saw Issa aiming a gun at Arlosoroff. Issa shot Arlosoroff and ran away. Abdul Majud was surprised, and not knowing what to do, ran after him. He asked Issa why he shot the man; he replied that he wanted to scare him so that he would leave and Issa would be able to assault his wife. At the last second, he grew afraid, and shot Arlosoroff.

Issa denied all involvement.

Soon after his confession, Sima came to another suspect line-up. She did not recognize either Abdul Majud or Issa.

In February 1934, Abdul Majud recanted his original confession, saying that he had met Stavsky and Rosenblatt in the Jaffa prison before he was transferred to Jerusalem. They had bribed him to take responsibility for the murder, saying that because he had confessed to the first murder, he could confess to another, and would receive the same punishment. With the help of a Hebrew-speaking Arab prisoner, they taught Abdul Majud exactly what happened and what he should tell the police.

This twist in the trial was inconsequential. Abdul Majud never testified in court. The prosecution used the story as another piece of evidence against Stavsky and Rosenblatt, especially in that Sima only recognized them. The defense dismissed it as a way for Abdul Majud to seek a personal revenge on Issa.

Shlomo Erell, later commander of the IDF Navy, returned to Israel at the end of 1936 after five months at sea, and was arrested by the British for his activities in the "Resistance Youth Alliance". Aral spent six months in Akko prison on the condition that he leave the country. While in prison, he met Abdul Majid, who claimed he was the one who murdered Arlozorov in a union with Issa Darwish.

== Trial ==
The Arlosoroff murder trial began in May 1934, and ended a week before the first anniversary of his assassination.

=== Prosecution ===
Mostly dependent on Sima's eyewitness testimony.

=== Stavsky ===
Photo Identification: the day that the police got Stavsky's photo from Halutz, the police brought it and a number of other photographs to Sima for identification. She identified Stavsky as Number 1.

Suspect Line-up: Sima walked with a police officer down a line of suspects the day that Stavsky was arrested. She stopped when she reached Stavsky. She physically identified him as Number 1.

Stavsky claimed that he was at the Sharon Restaurant in Jerusalem at 10 pm, the time of the murder. This was not proven. Witnesses testified that he was in Jerusalem before and after, but no one said that he was there at the exact window of time. The reliability of the witnesses was under question. Two policemen who were in the restaurant between 7:30–8:30 testified that they did not see Stavsky. Also, Stavsky's landlords testified for the prosecution that he was home in Tel Aviv in the early evening.

Stavsky also said that he slept in a Jerusalem hotel that night. Just because Stavsky slept in Jerusalem that Friday night does not mean that he could not have been in Tel Aviv earlier. There was no testimony as to when he arrived at the Jerusalem hotel and went to bed.

Also, Stavsky had planned to leave the country the following week – this fit in with his need to escape after his crime.

=== Rosenblatt ===
Sima didn't recognize Rosenblatt from a photograph, but she did recognize him in a line-up, a more reliable identification.

Jacket Identification: Sima was given nine jackets to identify, one of which belonged to Rosenblatt. She picked out Rosenblatt's jacket as the one worn by Number 2, explaining that she recognized it from its zig-zag pattern and red color.

Rosenblatt originally said that he was at a party. He later recanted and said he was at a Beitar meeting in Kfar Saba. Witnesses who were at the meeting, including Hanoch Kalai, were called and their stories did not always match. Also, the minutes of the meeting were presented, but it just so happened that night that a temporary secretary was taking notes, in a different fashion than what was normally done. Their authenticity was called into question.

Rosenblatt's girlfriend was in their tent when he came in that night. Only she would have known his exact whereabouts then, but she was not called to give testimony.

=== Defense ===
The defense insisted there was no premeditated motive for the crime, political or otherwise. The political parties act within the social confines of the Palestinian Jewish community and their functions do not warrant a murder, it said.

The defense attorneys said Arlosoroff had been in Europe until June 14, and his return was unexpected. If his own wife did not know when he would be returning, his political opponents certainly did not. Even if they began to plot after he returned, they had no way of knowing that he would be on the beach on Friday night. Until Friday afternoon, the Arlosoroffs themselves had assumed that they wouldn't be in Tel Aviv for the weekend. There is no way that a pre-meditated murder could be planned out in five hours, taking into consideration that Stavsky was in Jerusalem and Rosenblatt was in Kfar Saba all day Friday.

Rather, the defense contended that the crime was actually an 'impromptu sexual attack' by two other men. The men did not cover their faces and the shooter did not shoot right away. The murder was not his goal. The goal was to sexually attack Sima. They walked by the couple a few times, trying to draw attention to themselves. At one point, Number 1 urinated into the sea – 'display of exhibitionism'. In fact, Number 2's 'Oriental gesture' before he fired the gun was a sexual one.

=== Stavsky ===
Photo Identification: the police procedure was irregular. It was done after a warrant was put out for Stavsky's arrest, but before he was apprehended. Stavsky's profile looked distinct from the rest of the nine, in both his physical appearance and his clothing, thereby drawing more attention to him.

Suspect Line-up: it was done a day after Sima had identified Stavsky in the photo – his image was still in her memory. According to a police officer on duty, his arm was around her back – he could have unconsciously stopped her when they reached Stavsky. Also, as opposed to the rest of the men in the line-up, Stavsky was unshaven, hatless and hefty, thus making him stand out more.

Four people testified that they saw Stavsky in the Sharon Restaurant in Jerusalem that night, and that he was still there by 8:45 pm. This would not have given him enough time to get to Tel Aviv by the time of the murder. The Arlosoroffs only decided to go to the beach at 9:30 – there is no way that Stavsky could have known that in time to commit the crime.

=== Rosenblatt ===
Jacket Identification: The zig-zag pattern is a common design. Even more so, there is no way that Sima would have been able to see the color red at that time of night. Therefore, the color is inconsequential.

It is highly improbable that the minutes were counterfeited just for the defense of the accused. The point is that Rosenblatt was at the meeting for its entirety (until 10 pm), as can be shown by both the witnesses and the fact that his words were recorded twice in the minutes. There would have been no way for him to get to Tel Aviv to commit the murder by then. Also, the minutes were taken by a temporary secretary because the permanent secretary was religious and didn't write from Friday night until Saturday night.

=== Outcome ===
The presiding judges declared the following majority ruling:

"The Court, by majority, finds that at Tel Aviv, on the night of the June 16/17, 1933, with premeditated intent to kill, the accused Abraham Stavsky, did take part in the premeditated killing of Dr. Haim Arlosoroff by following him, waiting for him, stopping him and directing the light of an electric torch upon him and being close by during the commission of the offense." Stavsky was sentenced to death by hanging.

"As regards the accused, Zvi Rosenblatt, the Court does not find the other material evidence required by Section 5 of the Law of Evidence Amendment Ordinance, 1924, to corroborate his identification by Mrs. Arlosoroff. The accused, Zvi Rosenblatt, is therefore acquitted of the offense of which he stands charged."

The single dissenting judge ruled the following:

"That the crime was committed at such time and such a place when and where persons are known to and in fact do resort for immoral purposes...That the alibi of the accused is insufficiently established...The crime was not a political one but was most probably a common attack for sexual purposes...That none of the accused had any connection with the murder...I therefore find them not guilty of the charge and acquit them."

== Stavsky's appeal and acquittal ==
Stavsky was acquitted at the Court of Criminal Appeal because there not enough material evidence, as required by law. "The Appeal Court even went so far as to state that had the case been heard in England itself, or in most of the territories of the British Empire, the conviction would rightly have been upheld."

== Aftermath ==
In 1982, Israeli historian Shabtai Teveth re-introduced the event to the Israeli population with an investigative account of the murder and the trial proceedings. In response to the newly piqued public interest, the government, under the leadership of then-Prime Minister Menachem Begin, himself a member of the right-wing party, commissioned a state-administered investigative committee.

According to the commission's term of reference, "(A)llegations and accusations have recently been published—some of them for the first time—to the effect that Avraham Stavsky and Zvi Rosenblatt, or one of them, were accomplices to the murder of Dr. Chaim Arlosoroff (The Murder of Arlosoroff by Shabtai Teveth, Schocken Books, 1982)." The Bekhor Commission was required to “investigate these allegations and accusations, and submit a report to the cabinet on its findings.”

The Bekhor Commission's work continued for three years, at the end of which it was still unable to reach a positive conclusion about who murdered Arlosoroff. While the Commission definitively found that Stavsky and Rosenblatt did not commit the murder, the evidence and material brought before it were not sufficient to enable it to determine “who the murderers were,” and “whether it was a political murder on behalf of any party, or not."

== Importance ==
The trial proceedings of the murder of Arlosoroff highlighted the external and internal dynamics between the ruling British Mandate, the dominant Mapai party, and the opposing Revisionist party. This event was an important climax point in the internal relations of the Jews in Palestine, and its resonance continued even after the State of Israel was established in 1948.

== See also ==
- List of unsolved murders (1900–1979)
