= Esther Raziel-Naor =

Israeli politician (1911–2002)

- אסתר רזיאל-נאור
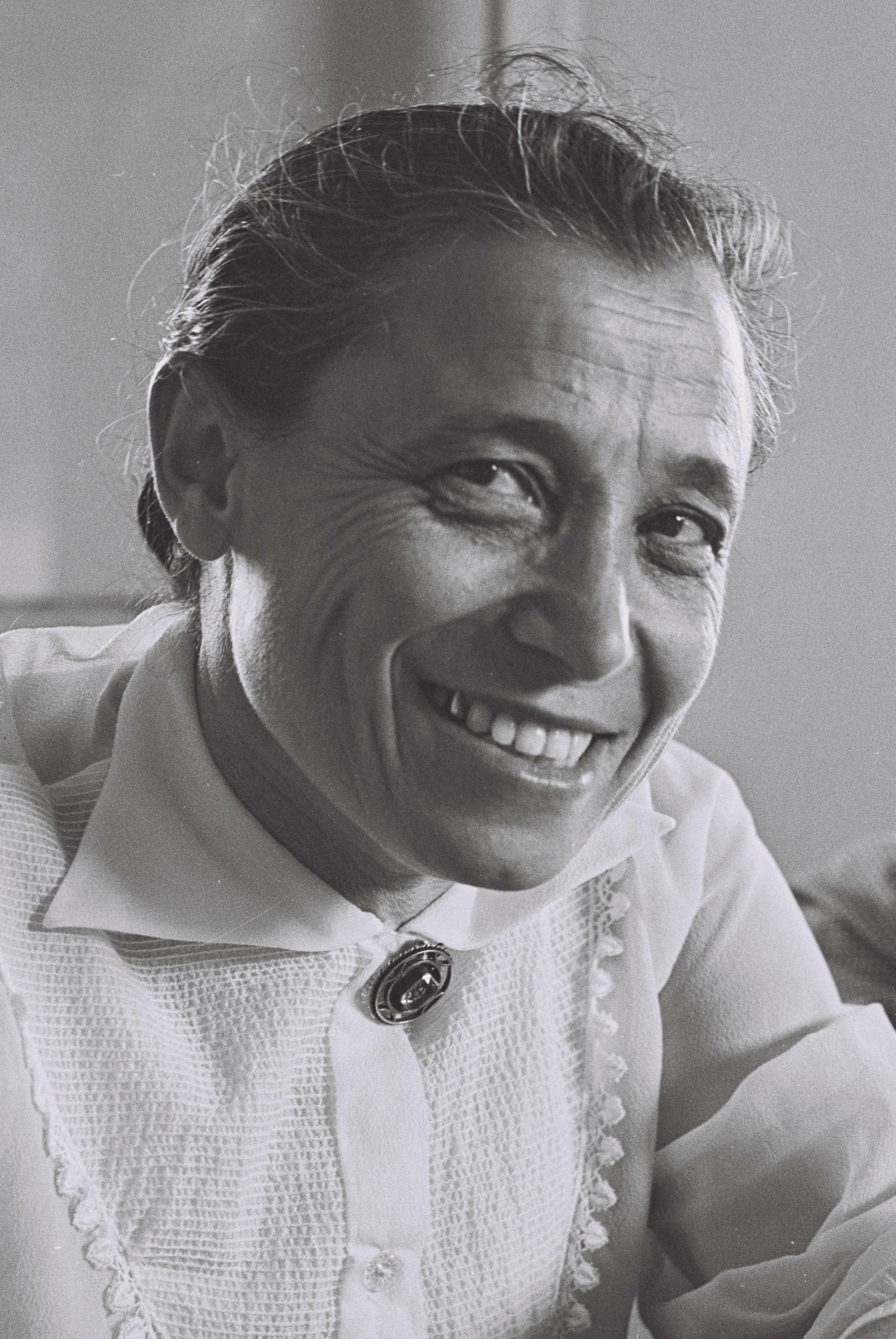

Faction represented in the Knesset
- 1949–1965: Herut
- 1965–1974: Gahal

Personal details
- Born: 29 November 1911 Smarhon, Russian Empire
- Died: 11 November 2002 (aged 90)

Esther Raziel-Naor (Hebrew: אסתר רזיאל-נאור; 29 November 1911 – 11 November 2002) was a Revisionist Zionist, Irgun leader and Israeli politician. She was the sister of fellow Irgun leader David Raziel.

== Biography ==
=== Early life ===
Raziel was born in Smarhon (now in Grodno Region, Belarus) in 1911, a year after her brother, David. Her household spoke Hebrew, as her parents refused to speak the more common Yiddish. In 1914, her family immigrated to Eretz Israel, after her father was offered a Hebrew teacher’s position at the “Tachmoni” school in Tel Aviv. However, when World War I began, the family was deported by the Ottomans, along with other Russian nationals, to Egypt. She moved back to Russia and returned to Palestine in 1923, after an 8-year absence.

In 1932, she joined Betar and organized the "National Cells." In 1935, she completed the Levinsky Teachers Seminary in Tel Aviv and moved to Jerusalem to work as a teacher, but was fired after being caught wearing a Betar insignia. She returned to Tel Aviv and took a "Lieutenants" course.

=== Irgun activity ===
In 1936, as the Arab Revolt began, she joined her brother in the Irgun. She took a first aid course and in August she took part in a reprisal. In 1939, she became the first broadcaster of the Irgun's underground radio station, Kol Zion Halohemet, as well as a writer for Hamashkif, its newspaper. In 1943 she was selected to be a member of the Irgun's command structure.

On March 4, 1944, the police raided her parents' house and found the radio transmitter. She was arrested along with her husband, Yehuda Naor, and was jailed in Bethlehem (Yehuda was taken to Acre and later deported to Africa, where he stayed for four and a half years, until the establishment of the State of Israel). While in prison, Naor went on a hunger strike to force the British to provide kosher food for Jewish prisoners. She was pregnant at the time of her arrest and on August 18, 1944, after a seven-month internment, she was released and gave birth shortly after. She was placed under house arrest and was frequently investigated.

On July 22, 1946, following the King David Hotel bombing, she was once again arrested and sent to the Latrun detention camp, where she remained for several weeks. After her release, she remained under strict surveillance and was prevented from continuing her underground activity.

=== State of Israel ===
After the United Nations Partition Plan for Palestine was accepted on November 29, 1947, she returned to Kol Zion. After the establishment of the State of Israel, she was one of the founders of Herut, and was elected on its list as a member of the 1st through 7th Knessets. Throughout her 25-year service she was a member of the Knesset's Education and Culture Committee and the House Committee. In the election to the 8th Knesset she was replaced by Geula Cohen.

She died on November 11, 2002, and was buried in Jerusalem. In 2011, the Jerusalem municipality named a street after her in Har Homa. Her son, Aryeh Naor, whose wife is Miriam Naor, the President of the Supreme Court of Israel, was cabinet secretary for both of Menachem Begin's governments.
