= Hanoch Kalai =

Irgun and Lehi leader

- חנוך קלאי
- Hanoch Kalai
- Born: Hanoch Strelitz; 13 March 1910; Lithuania, Russian Empire
- Died: April 15, 1979 (aged 69); Jerusalem, Israel
- Burial place: Mount of Olives, Jerusalem
- Spouse: Carmela Kalai
- Children: Gil Kalai
- Military career
- Allegiance: Irgun
- Service years: 1929–1942
- Rank: Deputy Commander in Chief of Irgun
- Conflicts: 1936–1939 Arab revolt in Palestine; Jewish insurgency in Mandatory Palestine
- Other work: Language lecturer, translator, editor

Hanoch Kalai (Hebrew: חנוך קלעי; March 13, 1910 – April 15, 1979) was a senior leader of Irgun and a co-founder of Lehi, and an expert on the Hebrew language. He was Deputy Commander in Chief of Irgun under David Raziel and spent three months as Commander in Chief after Raziel was imprisoned by the British authorities, until his own arrest. He was Avraham Stern's deputy until he left the organisation.

== Early life ==
Born Hanoch Strelitz, Kalai was born in Lithuania, the son of Joseph Strelitz and Pessia Rabinovich. In 1924, the family moved to Palestine, where family lived on Herzl Street in Kfar Saba and his father became a bank manager in the town and owned many orange groves. Following the 1929 Palestine riots, Kalai joined the Haganah. He was also a member of the Betar movement. In 1934 he was a defence witness in the trial of Ze'ev Rosenblatt for the Assassination of Haim Arlosoroff.

== Membership of Irgun ==
On the final night of Passover in 1933, Betar members were attacked while parading in Tel Aviv. In retaliation, Kalai resigned from Haganah and joined the Irgun. Soon afterward, he was appointed Irgun commander for Kfar Saba and Herzliya. During the 1936–1939 Arab revolt in Palestine, Kalai demanded an end to the policy of restraint and the beginning of reprisals against the Arabs. On 26 August 1939, Kalai ordered the killings of British colonial police officers Ralph Cairns and Ronald Barker via a remotely-detonated Irgun landmine containing fifteen kilograms of blasting gelatin and five kilograms of metal pieces in Rehavia, Jerusalem. The killings were carried out by Haim Corfu.

Following Avraham Tehomi's split with Irgun and return to Hagana in 1937, Kalai was appointed commander of the newly formed Haifa district Irgun under Moshe Rosenberg. He was later appointed deputy commander of the Jerusalem district under David Raziel. During this period, Kalai also served as a broadcaster on the Irgun's underground radio station, Kol Tsion HaLokhemet.

Kalai's three brothers were also members of Irgun and Betar. Mordechai Strelitz was an Irgun commander in Israel and abroad, and served as liaison between Irgun and Betar. Menachem Strelitz was a member of the Irgun in Kfar Saba, where he conducted experiments with weapons and explosives. He was killed at age 22 on July 17, 1936, when a grenade exploded in his hands in the family home. Mykhael Strelitz was arrested by the British and tortured. He never recovered from the experience.

=== Leadership of Irgun ===
Following Raziel's arrest on May 19, 1939, Kalai was appointed as Commander in Chief of the Irgun. At the first meeting he chaired, Kalai decided to act on two fronts: to continue retaliatory actions against the Arabs, and the commencement of operations against the British government following Parliament's approval of the White Paper of 1939. In following this policy, Irgun committed acts of sabotage against the infrastructure, including the post office and the government radio station in Jerusalem. Under Kalai's leadership, the group also assassinated the Palestine Police CID chief Ralph Cairns, to end his harassment of Irgun and in revenge for his torture of Irgun prisoners.

==== First Arrest ====
On 31 August 1939, the British arrested him with other key members of Irgun, including Avraham Stern, during a command meeting in Tel Aviv. He was replaced as head of Irgun by Benjamin Zeroni. The detainees were transferred to the Jaffa police station, and then to the Tzrifin detention camp. Kalai and the other prisoners were released on 18 June 1940.

== Membership of Lehi ==
Following his release, Kalai and Zeroni joined with Avraham Stern to co-found the Lehi, and Kalai served as second-in-command and wrote the new organization's manifesto. Kalai and Zeroni resigned from Lehi in late 1941 following Stern's attempts to form an alliance with Nazi Germany against the British.

=== Second Arrest ===
On 3 February 1942, the British police posted a £200 reward for his arrest, and on 4 February 1942, Kalai and Zeroni surrendered. According to Yehuda Lapidot, one of the reasons they surrendered is that no organization would help them, and they increasingly felt like hunted animals. By agreement with the British police, they were never tried, but instead were transferred directly to a detention camp. On 19 October 1944, Kalai was exiled to a Kenyan detention camp along with 250 other detainees, and returned to Israel only on 12 July 1948.

== Later life ==
After Israel gained independence, Kalai became a language lecturer at the Hebrew University of Jerusalem. He was also an editor and translator to Hebrew from English, German and Yiddish, an editor at the Bialik Institute, a member of the Academy of the Hebrew Language, and the Israel Broadcasting Authority plenum member responsible for Hebrew-language broadcasts. He translated Zorba the Greek into Hebrew, the first title in Am Oved's People's Library imprint. He also translated Virginia Woolf's Flush: A Biography.

Kalai was married to painter and sculptor Carmela Kalai. His son is noted academic Gil Kalai.

Kalai died in 1979, and was buried on the Mount of Olives in Jerusalem. In 1999, the Jerusalem Municipality named a street after him in the Malha district of the city.
