= Robert Bitker =

Irgun leader

Robert (Boris) Bitker
- רוברט (בוריס) ביטקר
- Citizenship: Israel
- Occupation: Military Force

Robert (Boris) Bitker (Hebrew: רוברט (בוריס) ביטקר; 1907 - 1977) was a military commander of the Zionist paramilitary group Irgun.

== Early life and education ==
Bitker was born in Warsaw, Poland. Bitker subsequently became involved in the Revisionist Zionist Betar movement. In 1933, he was appointed head (netziv) of the Betar command in southern China. In 1937, he went to Palestine, where he was appointed Commander-in-Chief of the Irgun. He held this position for a short time, and was quickly replaced after difficulties arose from two of his operations.

== Career ==
Bitker, adopting the strategy of Tsarist-era Russian revolutionaries, attempted to use bank robbery as a means of obtaining funds for operations. To this end he, with ex-members of Brit HaBiryonim, staged a bank robbery, though it was ultimately unsuccessful.

Bitker was also allegedly involved in the killing of Zvi Frenkel, a fellow Irgun militant who had killed an Arab in an act of retaliation using a gun he held illegally. After British authorities identified Frenkel as culprit in the killing, he was hidden by the Irgun. However, the British subsequently arrested his mother and spread rumors she was being tortured, which convinced him to turn himself in. Frenkel was later found, drowned and bound with wire, in the Yarkon River. According to Binyamin Eliav, Bitker was involved in the decision to have Frenkel killed because of worries that he might reveal details about Irgun members to British authorities.

Bitker was then smuggled out of Palestine and returned to Shanghai, where he led the local Betar group before emigrating to the United States, where he lived for the rest of his life.
