= Ralph Cairns =

British police officer (1907–1939)

Ralph Cairns (23 October 1907 – 26 August 1939) was a British police officer who was commander of the Jewish Section of the Palestine Police's Criminal Investigation Department (CID) until his assassination by Irgun alongside Ronald Barker.

== Biography ==
Cairns was born in Greenock, Scotland. Enrolling in the Palestine Police in 1931, unusually for the time without any previous police service, he was quickly identified as a high-flyer, passing his advanced Arabic exam from a standing start in two years. Cairns was also the first British Policeman to speak fluent Hebrew.

In April 1938, while serving as a sergeant in Haifa, he investigated the deaths of two Arab women and two British Police officers who were killed in a bomb blast on a train. Using his many Jewish friends and contacts he traced the planning of the attack to Avraham Stern. Stern later would break away from the Irgun. This was the first time the name of Stern had come to the attention of the Palestine Police.

Following this event Cairns was promoted to the rank of Inspector and transferred to Jerusalem where he became Head of Jewish Section in the CID. His opposite number was Inspector Ronald Barker who held the parallel post in Arab Affairs. During his service in the Palestine Police, Irgun accused Cairns of the torture of a number of its members, including Benjamin Zerony and Mordechai Pacho.

The alleged torture of Zerony between 5–8 August 1939 resulted in a Palestine-wide leaflet being distributed by the Irgun announcing he was to be assassinated. Zerony was close to Avraham Stern, but had become concerned when Stern ordered the death of his own Irgun operative for refusing to explode a device to kill British police officer Geoffrey Morton because there were Jewish children playing in the street. Files released by MI5 in 2017 confirm that, at that time, Zerony was complicit with British Police in providing information about Stern. Later Zerony fled to the USA and returned after an armistice was agreed. MI5 files report that the real reason for Cairns' assassination was his and his sergeant’s (Tom Wilkin) success in closing the net on Avraham Stern.

Previous attempts to assassinate Cairns had been made by shooting from the pillion of a motorcycle when he was walking with his German fiancée Marianna Laur in a market. Cairns, using his service revolver, pushed his fiancée aside and shot the pillion rider dead, with the driver escaping on foot through the town.

== Assassination ==
On 26 August 1939, Cairns and Barker were assassinated by a remotely-detonated Irgun landmine containing 15 kilograms (33 lb) of blasting gelatin and 5 kilograms (11 lb) of metal pieces in Rehavia, Jerusalem, on the orders of then Irgun leader Hanoch Kalai. The Irgun member who detonated the mine was future Israeli politician Haim Corfu. Cairns is buried in the Jerusalem Protestant Cemetery. At the time, the deaths caused outrage in both the Jewish community, where both men had a wide circle of friends, and among the ex-pat population. Articles in the Jerusalem Post and the Jewish Chronicle condemned the attacks as an outrage.

Like his nemesis Avraham Stern, Cairns' fiancée was pregnant when he died. Marianna Laur later married an American serviceman and went to live in the United States. However, Laur arranged with the British government for Cairns' daughter (Ralpha) to carry his surname. Laur held a memorial service at her church every year for him until her death in 2001.
