= Kol Tsion HaLokhemet =

- Broadcast area: Palestine

Programming
- Language: Hebrew
- Affiliations: Irgun

Ownership
- Owner: Irgun

Kol Tsion HaLokhemet (Hebrew: קוֹל צִיּוֹן הלוֹחֶמֶת) (lit. "Voice of Fighting Zion") was the underground radio station of the Irgun.

== History ==
Kol Zion HaLokhemet was operated from February 1939. It may have been the first underground radio station in the world. It was located opposite Meir Park, in Tel Aviv.

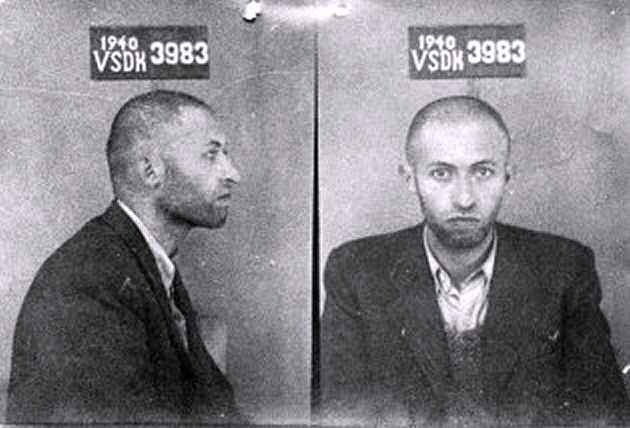
NKVD mug shot of Menachem Begin, 1940

The radio station used its broadcasts to give information about the goals and intentions of the Irgun. Irgun leader Menachem Begin, who eluded capture during the struggle with the British during the period of the British Mandate of Palestine, used Kol Zion to communicate with the Jews of Palestine. For example, he declared: "Not only were Jews injured and thousands of pounds worth of damage done to Jewish property in Jerusalem. Our national pride was injured as well. Once again we became 'protected Jews' as British troops pretended to defend us..."

In 1939 Esther Raziel-Naor, the sister of fellow Irgun leader David Raziel, became the first broadcaster of the radio station.

In September 1945 the radio station was used to attack Chaim Weizmann, of the Jewish Agency, as a "Jewish Quisling."

In August 1946 the station was used to call for a revolt and war against the Palestine Administration.

In November 1946 the station was used to denounce as lies British assertions that the Irgun intended to assassinate members of the government and the military. That same month the Irgun used the station to appeal to the Haganah to join it in fighting the British. It also used the station that month to indicate that it would be expanding its activities outside of Palestine.

In December 1947, the station was used to announce "Enough [with restraint]. From now on we [shall attack] the nests of murderers."

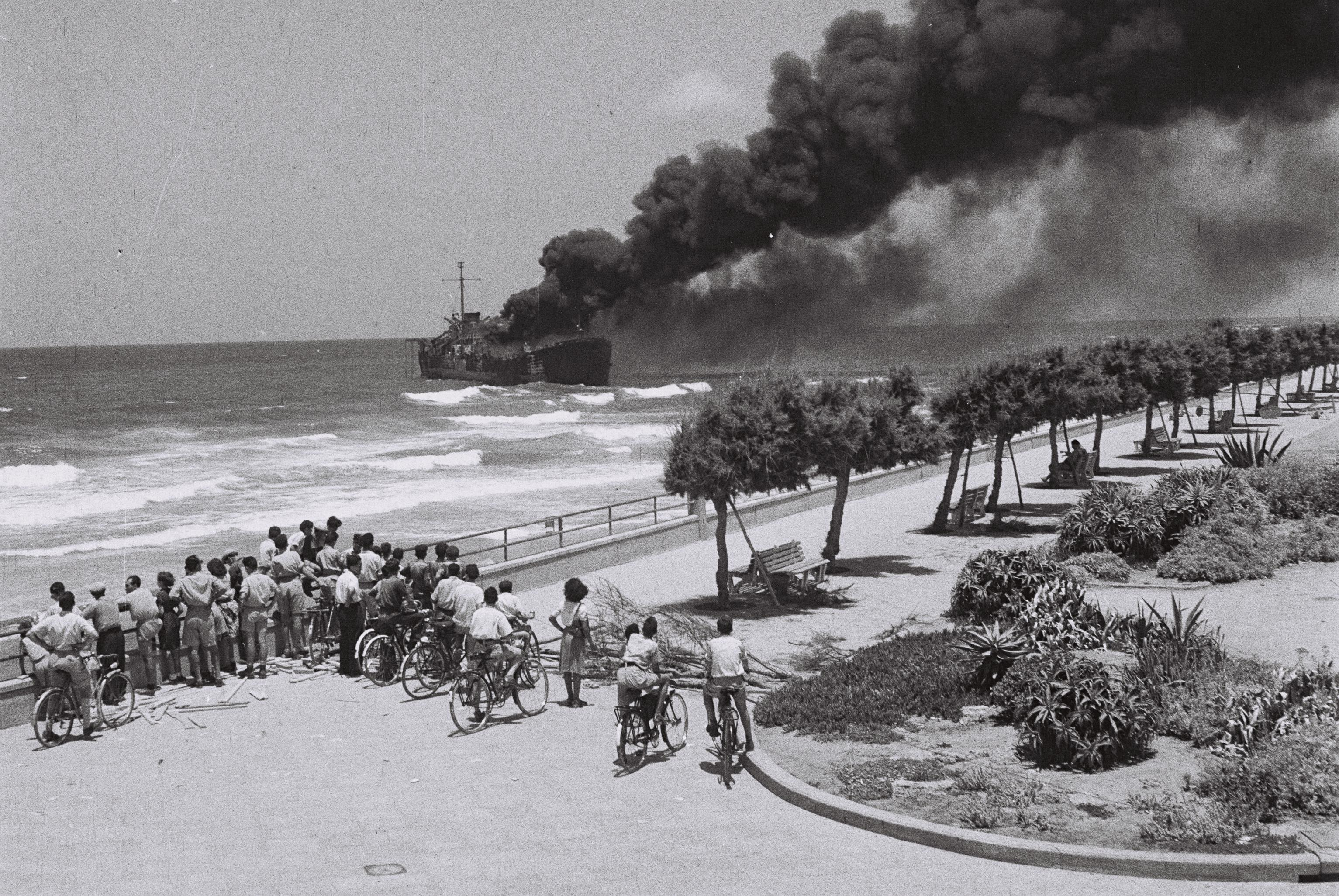
Altalena on fire

When the Irgun was attacked by the Haganah at the Altalena, Begin used the radio station to urge his men not to counter-attack. while at the same time excoriating David Ben-Gurion.

A number of its radio broadcast transcripts between 1936 and 1948 are collected by Psychological Warfare and Propaganda: Irgun Documentation.

== See also ==
- Voice of Israel
- Kol Yisrael
