= Irgun =

Zionist paramilitary organization (1931–1948)

National Military Organization
- Hebrew: הארגון הצבאי הלאומי
- Irgun emblem. The map shows both Mandatory Palestine and the Emirate of Transjordan, which the Irgun claimed in its entirety for a future Jewish state. The acronym "Etzel" is written above the map, and "raq kach" ("only thus") is written below.
- Dates active: 1931–1949
- Split from: Haganah
- Merged into: Israel Defense Forces
- Country: Mandatory Palestine; Israel
- Allegiance: Yishuv
- Ideology: Revisionist Zionism
- Political position: Right-wing to far-right
- Status: Paramilitary
- Part of: Jewish Resistance Movement

The Irgun (Hebrew: ארגון), officially the National Military Organization in the Land of Israel, (Note: Hebrew: הארגון הצבאי הלאומי בארץ ישראל, romanized: HaIrgun HaTzvaʾi Ha-Leumi b-Eretz Israel) often abbreviated as Etzel (אצ״ל) or IZL, was a Zionist paramilitary organization that operated in Mandatory Palestine between 1931 and 1948. It was an offshoot of the older and larger Jewish paramilitary organization Haganah.

The Irgun policy was based on Revisionist Zionism, founded by Ze'ev Jabotinsky. Two of the most infamous operations for which the Irgun were known were the bombing of the British administrative headquarters for Mandatory Palestine in Jerusalem on 22 July 1946 and the Deir Yassin massacre, carried out with Lehi on 9 April 1948.

The organization committed acts of terrorism against Palestinian Arabs, as well as against the British authorities, who were regarded as illegal occupiers. In particular the Irgun was described as a terrorist organization by the United Nations, British, and United States governments; in media such as The New York Times newspaper; as well as by the Anglo-American Committee of Inquiry, the 1946 Zionist Congress, and the Jewish Agency. Hannah Arendt and Albert Einstein, in a letter to The New York Times in 1948, compared Irgun and its successor Herut party to "Nazi and Fascist parties" and described it as a "terrorist, right wing, chauvinist organization".

Following the establishment of the State of Israel during the 1948 Palestine war, the Irgun began to be absorbed into the newly created Israel Defense Forces. Conflict between the Irgun and the IDF escalated into the 1948 Altalena Affair, and the Irgun formally disbanded on 12 January 1949. The Irgun was a political predecessor to Israel's right-wing Herut ("Freedom") party, which led to today's Likud party. Likud has led or been part of most Israeli governments since 1977.

== Ideology and organization ==
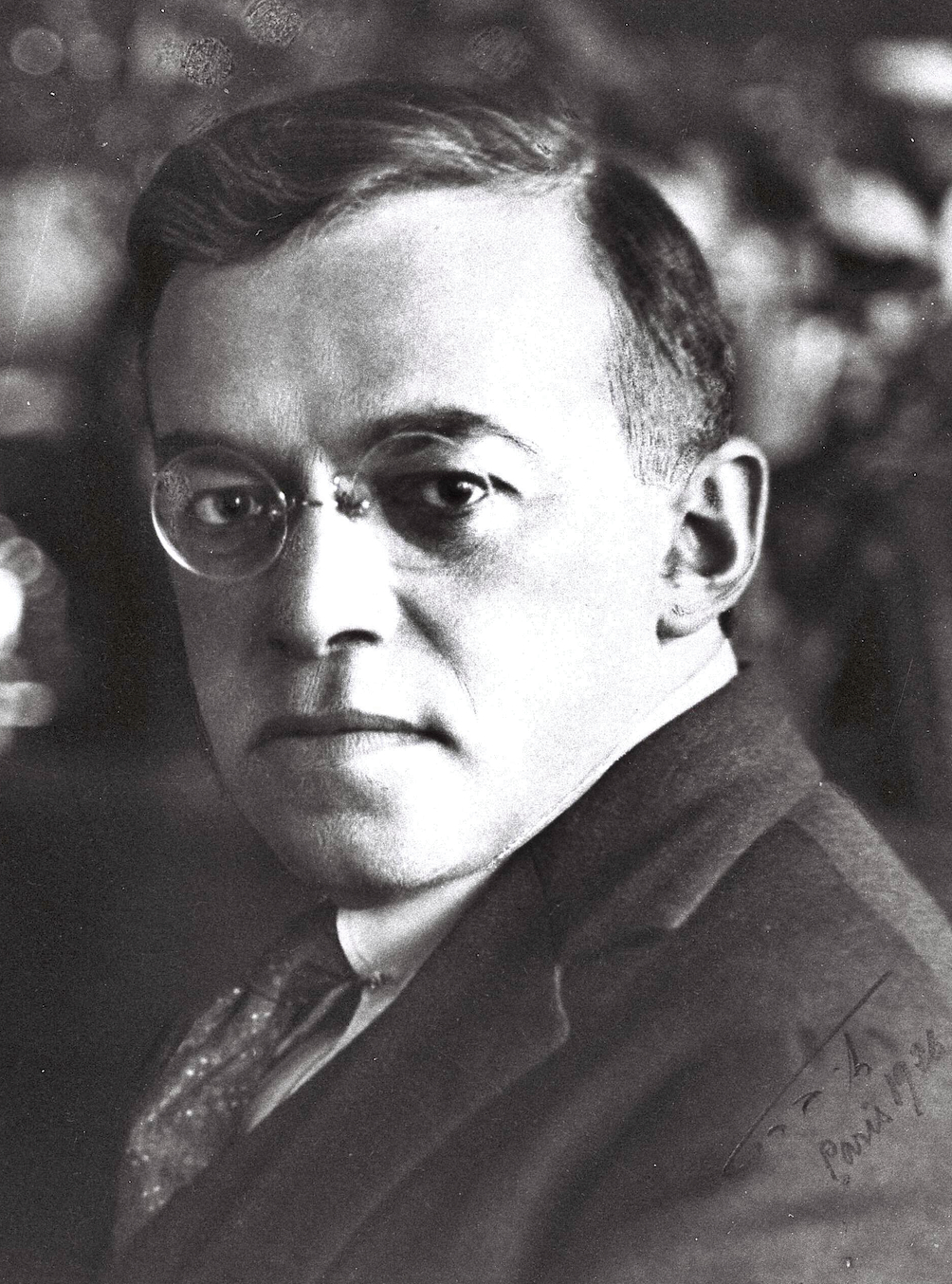
Ze'ev Jabotinsky, who formulated the movement's ideology and was Supreme Commander of the Etzel

Members of the Irgun came mostly from Betar and from the Revisionist Party both in Palestine and abroad. The Revisionist Movement made up a popular backing for the underground organization. Ze'ev Jabotinsky, founder of Revisionist Zionism, commanded the organization until he died in 1940. He formulated the general realm of operation, regarding Restraint and the end thereof, and was the inspiration for the organization overall. An additional major source of ideological inspiration was the poetry of Uri Zvi Greenberg. The symbol of the organization, with the motto רק כך (only thus), underneath a hand holding a rifle in the foreground of a map showing both Mandatory Palestine and the Emirate of Transjordan (at the time, both were administered under the terms of the British Mandate for Palestine), implied that force was the only way to "liberate the homeland."

The number of members of the Irgun varied from a few hundred to a few thousand. Most of its members were people who joined the organization's command, under which they carried out various operations and filled positions, largely in opposition to British law. Most of them were "ordinary" people, who held regular jobs, and only a few dozen worked full-time in the Irgun.

The Irgun disagreed with the policy of the Yishuv and with the World Zionist Organization, both with regard to strategy and basic ideology and with regard to PR and military tactics, such as use of armed force to accomplish the Zionist ends, operations against the Arabs during the riots, and relations with the British mandatory government. Therefore, the Irgun tended to ignore the decisions made by the Zionist leadership and the Yishuv's institutions. This fact caused the elected bodies not to recognize the independent organization, and during most of the time of its existence the organization was seen as irresponsible, and its actions thus worthy of thwarting. Accordingly, the Irgun accompanied its armed operations with public-relations campaigns aiming to convince the public of the Irgun's way and the problems with the official political leadership of the Yishuv. The Irgun put out numerous advertisements, an underground newspaper and even ran the first independent Hebrew radio station – Kol Zion HaLochemet.

=== Structure of organization ===
Irgun operational commanders
Period	Commander
1931–1937	Avraham Tehomi
1937	Robert Bitker
1937–1938	Moshe Rosenberg
1938–1939	David Raziel
1939	Hanoch Kalai
1939	Benyamin Zeroni
1939–1941	David Raziel
1941–1943	Yaakov Meridor
1943–1948	Menachem Begin
Note: 1937–1940 Jabotinsky was Supreme Commander of the Irgun

As members of an underground armed organization, Irgun personnel did not normally call Irgun by its name but rather used other names. In the first years of its existence it was known primarily as Ha-Haganah Leumit (The National Defense), and also by names such as Haganah Bet ("Second Defense"), Irgun Bet ("Second Irgun"), the Parallel Organization and the Rightwing Organization. Later on it became most widely known as המעמד (the Stand). The anthem adopted by the Irgun was "Anonymous Soldiers", written by Avraham (Yair) Stern who was at the time a commander in the Irgun. Later on Stern defected from the Irgun and founded Lehi, and the song became the anthem of the Lehi. The Irgun's new anthem then became the third verse of the "Betar Song", by Ze'ev Jabotinsky.

The Irgun gradually evolved from its humble origins into a serious and well-organized paramilitary organization. The movement developed a hierarchy of ranks and a sophisticated command-structure, and came to demand serious military training and strict discipline from its members. It developed clandestine networks of hidden arms-caches and weapons-production workshops, safe-houses, and training camps, along with a secret printing facility for propaganda posters.

The ranks of the Irgun were (in ascending order):

- Khayal = (Private)
- Segen Rosh Kvutza, Segen ("Deputy Group Leader", "Deputy") = Assistant Squad Leader (Lance Corporal)
- Rosh Kvutza ("Group Leader") = Squad Leader (Corporal)
- Samal ("Sergeant") = Section Leader (Sergeant)
- Samal Rishon ("Sergeant First Class") = Brigade Leader (Platoon Sergeant)
- Rav Samal ("Chief Sergeant") = Battalion Leader (Master Sergeant)
- Gundar Sheni, Gundar ("Commander Second Class", "Commander") = District Commander (2nd Lieutenant)
- Gundar Rishon ("Commander First Class") = Senior Branch Commander, Headquarters Staff (Lieutenant).

The Irgun was led by a High Command, which set policy and gave orders. Directly underneath it was a General Staff, which oversaw the activities of the Irgun. The General Staff was divided into a military and a support staff. The military staff was divided into operational units that oversaw operations and support units in charge of planning, instruction, weapons caches and manufacture, and first aid. The military and support staff never met jointly; they communicated through the High Command. Beneath the General Staff were six district commands: Jerusalem, Tel Aviv, Haifa-Galilee, Southern, Sharon, and Shomron, each led by a district commander. A local Irgun district unit was called a "Branch". A "brigade" in the Irgun was made up of three sections. A section was made up of two groups, at the head of each was a "Group Head", and a deputy. Eventually, various units were established, which answered to a "Center" or "Staff".

The head of the Irgun High Command was the overall commander of the organization, but the designation of his rank varied. During the revolt against the British, Irgun commander Menachem Begin and the entire High Command held the rank of Gundar Rishon. His predecessors, however, had held their own ranks. A rank of Military Commander (Seren) was awarded to the Irgun commander Yaakov Meridor and a rank of High Commander (Aluf) to David Raziel. Until his death in 1940, Jabotinsky was known as the "Military Commander of the Etzel" or the Ha-Matzbi Ha-Elyon ("Supreme Commander").

Under the command of Menachem Begin, the Irgun was divided into different corps:

- Hayil Kravi (Combat Corps) – responsible for combat operations
- Delek ("Gasoline") – the intelligence section; responsible for gathering and translating intelligence, and maintaining contact with local and foreign journalists
- HAT (Planning Division) – responsible for planning activities
- HATAM (Revolutionary Publicity Corps) – responsible for printing and disseminating propaganda

The Irgun's commanders planned for it to have a regular combat force, a reserve, and shock units, but in practice there were not enough personnel for a reserve or for a shock force.

The Irgun emphasized that its fighters be highly disciplined. Strict drill exercises were carried out at ceremonies at different times, and strict attention was given to discipline, formal ceremonies and military relationships between the various ranks. The Irgun put out professional publications on combat doctrine, weaponry, leadership, drill exercises, etc. Among these publications were three books written by David Raziel, who had studied military history, techniques, and strategy:

- The Pistol (written in collaboration with Avraham Stern)
- The Theory of Training
- Parade Ground and Field Drill

A British analysis noted that the Irgun's discipline was "as strict as any army in the world."

The Irgun operated a sophisticated recruitment and military-training regime. Those wishing to join had to find and make contact with a member, meaning only those who personally knew a member or were persistent could find their way in. Once contact had been established, a meeting was set up with the three-member selection committee at a safe-house, where the recruit was interviewed in a darkened room, with the committee either positioned behind a screen, or with a flashlight shone into the recruit's eyes. The interviewers asked basic biographical questions, and then asked a series of questions designed to weed out romantics and adventurers and those who had not seriously contemplated the potential sacrifices. Those selected attended a four-month series of indoctrination seminars in groups of five to ten, where they were taught the Irgun's ideology and the code of conduct it expected of its members. These seminars also had another purpose - to weed out the impatient and those of flawed purpose who had gotten past the selection interview. Then, members were introduced to other members, were taught the locations of safe-houses, and given military training. Irgun recruits trained with firearms, hand grenades, and were taught how to conduct combined attacks on targets. Arms handling and tactics courses were given in clandestine training camps, while practice shooting took place in the desert or by the sea. Eventually, separate training camps were established for heavy-weapons training. The most rigorous course was the explosives course for bomb-makers, which lasted a year. The British authorities believed that some Irgun members enlisted in the Jewish section of the Palestine Police Force for a year as part of their training, during which they also passed intelligence. In addition to the Irgun's sophisticated training program, many Irgun members were veterans of the Haganah (including the Palmach), the British Armed Forces, and Jewish partisan groups that had waged guerrilla warfare in Nazi-occupied Europe, thus bringing significant military training and combat experience into the organization. The Irgun also operated a course for its intelligence operatives, in which recruits were taught espionage, cryptography, and analysis techniques.

Of the Irgun's members, almost all were part-time members. They were expected to maintain their civilian lives and jobs, dividing their time between their civilian lives and underground activities. There were never more than 40 full-time members, who were given a small expense stipend on which to live on. Upon joining, every member received an underground name. The Irgun's members were divided into cells, and worked with the members of their own cells. The identities of Irgun members in other cells were withheld. This ensured that an Irgun member taken prisoner could betray no more than a few comrades.

In addition to the Irgun's members in Palestine, underground Irgun cells composed of local Jews were established in Europe following World War II. An Irgun cell was also established in Shanghai, home to many European-Jewish refugees. The Irgun also set up a Swiss bank account. Eli Tavin, the former head of Irgun intelligence, was appointed commander of the Irgun abroad.

In November 1947, the Jewish insurgency came to an end as the UN approved of the partition of Palestine, and the British had announced their intention to withdraw the previous month. As the British left and the 1947-48 Civil War in Mandatory Palestine got underway, the Irgun came out of the underground and began to function more as a standing army rather an underground organization. It began openly recruiting, training, and raising funds, and established bases, including training facilities. It also introduced field communications and created a medical unit and supply service.

Until World War II the group armed itself with weapons purchased in Europe, primarily Italy and Poland, and smuggled to Palestine. The Irgun also established workshops that manufactured spare parts and attachments for the weapons. Also manufactured were land mines and simple hand grenades. Another way in which the Irgun armed itself was theft of weapons from the British Police and military.

== Prior to World War II ==
=== Zionism ===
The modern Zionist movement emerged in the late 19th century. At the First Zionist Congress in Basel in 1897, the movement adopted the Basel Program, which stated its goal as "to create for the Jewish people a home in Palestine secured by public law." In the early decades of the 1900s, Zionist activity was focused on the practical implementation though land purchase strategies in Ottoman and then Mandatory Palestine territories, as well as Jewish immigration waves (Aliyah). British rule during the Mandatory Palestine era (1917-1947), committed to the 1917 Balfour Declaration, which gave international backing to Zionist aims. The 1919 King–Crane Commission reported that at the time, the non-Jewish inhabitants of Palestine, who comprised nearly nine-tenths of the population, had been "emphatically against the entire Zionist program" and recommended that "only a greatly reduced Zionist program be attempted". However, the Commission's recommendations were not adopted as policy by the major Allied powers who effectively gave international legal backing to the Balfour Declaration framework. Initially, Arab political opposition to Zionist immigration and British rule found expression in "political Arabism" during the late Ottoman period (1908–1914) but the opposition developed primarily during the British Mandate period, particularly in response to increased Jewish immigration, land acquisition, and British administrative policies, including riots in 1920, 1921, and 1929.

=== Founding ===
The Irgun's first steps were in the aftermath of the Riots of 1929. In the Jerusalem branch of the Haganah there were feelings of disappointment and internal unrest towards the leadership of the movements and the Histadrut (at that time the organization running the Haganah). These feelings were a result of the view that the Haganah was not adequately defending Jewish interests in the region. Likewise, critics of the leadership spoke out against alleged failures in the number of weapons, readiness of the movement and its policy of restraint and not fighting back. On April 10, 1931, commanders and equipment managers announced that they refused to return weapons to the Haganah that had been issued to them earlier, prior to the Nebi Musa holiday. These weapons were later returned by the commander of the Jerusalem branch, Avraham Tehomi, a.k.a. "Gideon". However, the commanders who decided to rebel against the leadership of the Haganah relayed a message regarding their resignations to the Vaad Leumi, and thus this schism created a new independent movement.

The leader of the new underground movement was Avraham Tehomi, alongside other founding members who were all senior commanders in the Haganah, members of Hapoel Hatzair and of the Histadrut. Also among them was Eliyahu Ben Horin, an activist in the Revisionist Party. This group was known as the "Odessan Gang", because they previously had been members of the Haganah Ha'Atzmit of Jewish Odessa. The new movement was named Irgun Tsvai Leumi, ("National Military Organization") in order to emphasize its active nature in contrast to the Haganah. Moreover, the organization was founded with the desire to become a true military organization and not just a militia as the Haganah was at the time.

In the autumn of that year the Jerusalem group merged with other armed groups affiliated with Betar. The Betar groups' center of activity was in Tel Aviv, and they began their activity in 1928 with the establishment of "Officers and Instructors School of Betar". Students at this institution had broken away from the Haganah earlier, for political reasons, and the new group called itself the "National Defense", הגנה הלאומית. During the riots of 1929 Betar youth participated in the defense of Tel Aviv neighborhoods under the command of Yermiyahu Halperin, at the behest of the Tel Aviv city hall. After the riots the Tel Avivian group expanded, and was known as "The Right Wing Organization".

After the Tel Aviv expansion another branch was established in Haifa. Towards the end of 1932 the Haganah branch of Safed also defected and joined the Irgun, as well as many members of the Maccabi sports association. At that time the movement's underground newsletter, Ha'Metsudah (the Fortress) also began publication, expressing the active trend of the movement. The Irgun also increased its numbers by expanding draft regiments of Betar – groups of volunteers, committed to two years of security and pioneer activities. These regiments were based in places that from which stemmed new Irgun strongholds in the many places, including the settlements of Yesod HaMa'ala, Mishmar HaYarden, Rosh Pina, Metula and Nahariya in the north; in the center – Hadera, Binyamina, Herzliya, Netanya and Kfar Saba, and south of there – Rishon LeZion, Rehovot and Ness Ziona. Later on regiments were also active in the Old City of Jerusalem ("the Kotel Brigades") among others. Primary training centers were based in Ramat Gan, Qastina (by Kiryat Mal'akhi of today) and other places.

=== Under Tehomi's command ===
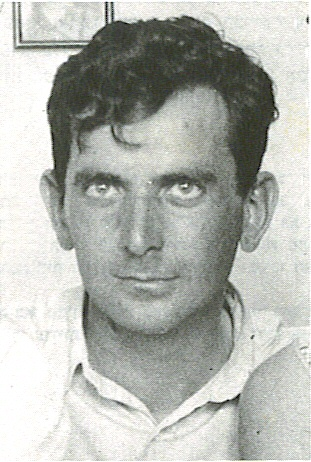
Avraham Tehomi, the first Commander of the Irgun

In 1933 there were some signs of unrest, seen by the incitement of the local Arab leadership to act against the authorities. The strong British response put down the disturbances quickly. During that time the Irgun operated in a similar manner to the Haganah and was a guarding organization. The two organizations cooperated in ways such as coordination of posts and even intelligence sharing.

Within the Irgun, Tehomi was the first to serve as "Head of the Headquarters" or "Chief Commander". Alongside Tehomi served the senior commanders, or "Headquarters" of the movement. As the organization grew, it was divided into district commands.

In August 1933 a "Supervisory Committee" for the Irgun was established, which included representatives from most of the Zionist political parties. The members of this committee were Meir Grossman (of the Hebrew State Party), Rabbi Meir Bar-Ilan (of the Mizrachi Party), either Immanuel Neumann or Yehoshua Supersky (of the General Zionists) and Ze'ev Jabotinsky or Eliyahu Ben Horin (of Hatzohar).

In protest against, and with the aim of ending Jewish immigration to Palestine, the Great Arab Revolt of 1936–1939 broke out on April 19, 1936. The riots took the form of attacks by Arab rioters ambushing main roads, bombing of roads and settlements as well as property and agriculture vandalism. In the beginning, the Irgun and the Haganah generally maintained a policy of restraint, apart from a few instances. Some expressed resentment at this policy, leading up internal unrest in the two organizations. The Irgun tended to retaliate more often, and sometimes Irgun members patrolled areas beyond their positions in order to encounter attackers ahead of time. However, there were differences of opinion regarding what to do in the Haganah, as well. Due to the joining of many Betar Youth members, Jabotinsky (founder of Betar) had a great deal of influence over Irgun policy. Nevertheless, Jabotinsky was of the opinion that for moral reasons violent retaliation was not to be undertaken.

In November 1936 the Peel Commission was sent to inquire regarding the breakout of the riots and propose a solution to end the Revolt. In early 1937 there were still some in the Yishuv who felt the commission would recommend a partition of Mandatory Palestine (the land west of the Jordan River), thus creating a Jewish state on part of the land. The Irgun leadership, as well as the "Supervisory Committee" held similar beliefs, as did some members of the Haganah and the Jewish Agency. This belief strengthened the policy of restraint and led to the position that there was no room for defense institutions in the future Jewish state. Tehomi was quoted as saying: "We stand before great events: a Jewish state and a Jewish army. There is a need for a single military force". This position intensified the differences of opinion regarding the policy of restraint, both within the Irgun and within the political camp aligned with the organization. The leadership committee of the Irgun supported a merger with the Haganah. On April 24, 1937, a referendum was held among Irgun members regarding its continued independent existence. David Raziel and Avraham (Yair) Stern came out publicly in support for the continued existence of the Irgun:

The Irgun has been placed ... before a decision to make, whether to submit to the authority of the government and the Jewish Agency or to prepare for a double sacrifice and endangerment. Some of our friends do not have appropriate willingness for this difficult position, and have submitted to the Jewish Agency and has left the battle ... all of the attempts ... to unite with the leftist organization have failed, because the Left entered into negotiations not on the basis of unification of forces, but the submission of one such force to the other....

=== The first split ===
In April 1937 the Irgun split after the referendum. Approximately 1,500–2,000 people, about half of the Irgun's membership, including the senior command staff, regional committee members, along with most of the Irgun's weapons, returned to the Haganah, which at that time was under the Jewish Agency's leadership. The Supervisory Committee's control over the Irgun ended, and Jabotinsky assumed command. In their opinion, the removal of the Haganah from the Jewish Agency's leadership to the national institutions necessitated their return. Furthermore, they no longer saw significant ideological differences between the movements. Those who remained in the Irgun were primarily young activists, mostly laypeople, who sided with the independent existence of the Irgun. In fact, most of those who remained were originally Betar people. Moshe Rosenberg estimated that approximately 1,800 members remained. In theory, the Irgun remained an organization not aligned with a political party, but in reality the supervisory committee was disbanded and the Irgun's continued ideological path was outlined according to Ze'ev Jabotinsky's school of thought and his decisions, until the movement eventually became Revisionist Zionism's military arm. One of the major changes in policy by Jabotinsky was the end of the policy of restraint.

On April 27, 1937, the Irgun founded a new headquarters, staffed by Moshe Rosenberg at the head, Avraham (Yair) Stern as secretary, David Raziel as head of the Jerusalem branch, Hanoch Kalai as commander of Haifa and Aharon Haichman as commander of Tel Aviv. On 20 Tammuz, (June 29) the day of Theodor Herzl's death, a ceremony was held in honor of the reorganization of the underground movement. For security purposes this ceremony was held at a construction site in Tel Aviv.

Ze'ev Jabotinsky placed Col. Robert Bitker at the head of the Irgun. Bitker had previously served as Betar commissioner in China and had military experience. A few months later, probably due to total incompatibility with the position, Jabotinsky replaced Bitker with Moshe Rosenberg. When the Peel Commission report was published a few months later, the Revisionist camp decided not to accept the commission's recommendations. Moreover, the organizations of Betar, Hatzohar and the Irgun began to increase their efforts to bring Jews to Eretz Israel (the Land of Israel), illegally. This Aliyah was known as the עליית אף על פי "Af Al Pi (Nevertheless) Aliyah". As opposed to this position, the Jewish Agency began acting on behalf of the Zionist interest on the political front, and continued the policy of restraint. From this point onwards the differences between the Haganah and the Irgun were much more obvious.

=== Illegal immigration ===
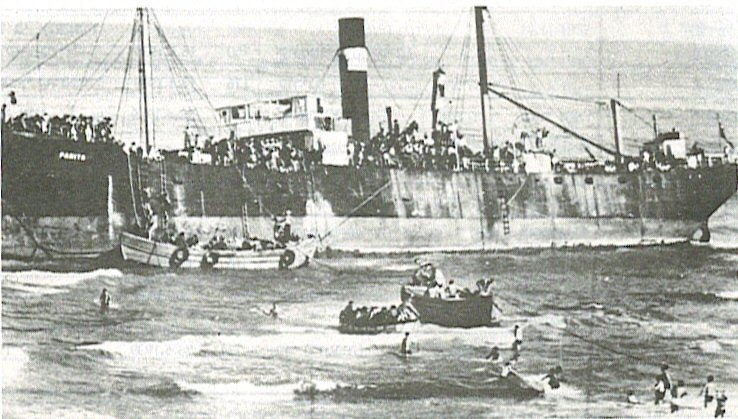
The ship Parita unloading immigrants at the beach in Tel Aviv

According to Jabotinsky's "Evacuation Plan", which called for millions of European Jews to be brought to Palestine at once, the Irgun helped the illegal immigration of European Jews to Palestine. This was named by Jabotinsky the "National Sport". The most significant part of this immigration prior to World War II was carried out by the Revisionist camp, largely because the Yishuv institutions and the Jewish Agency shied away from such actions on grounds of cost and their belief that Britain would in the future allow widespread Jewish immigration.

The Irgun joined forces with Hatzohar and Betar in September 1937, when it assisted with the landing of a convoy of 54 Betar members at Tantura Beach (near Haifa.) The Irgun was responsible for discreetly bringing the Olim, or Jewish immigrants, to the beaches, and dispersing them among the various Jewish settlements. The Irgun also began participating in the organisation of the immigration enterprise and undertook the process of accompanying the ships. This began with the ship Draga which arrived at the coast of British Palestine in September 1938. In August of the same year, an agreement was made between Ari Jabotinsky (the son of Ze'ev Jabotinsky), the Betar representative and Hillel Kook, the Irgun representative, to coordinate the immigration (also known as Ha'apala). This agreement was also made in the "Paris Convention" in February 1939, at which Ze'ev Jabotinsky and David Raziel were present. Afterwards, the "Aliyah Center" was founded, made up of representatives of Hatzohar, Betar, and the Irgun, thereby making the Irgun a full participant in the process.

The difficult conditions on the ships demanded a high level of discipline. The people on board the ships were often split into units, led by commanders. In addition to having a daily roll call and the distribution of food and water (usually very little of either), organized talks were held to provide information regarding the actual arrival in Palestine. One of the largest ships was the Sakaria, with 2,300 passengers, which equalled about 0.5% of the Jewish population in Palestine. The first vessel arrived on April 13, 1937, and the last on February 13, 1940. All told, about 18,000 Jews immigrated to Palestine with the help of the Revisionist organizations and private initiatives by other Revisionists. Most were not caught by the British.

=== End of restraint ===
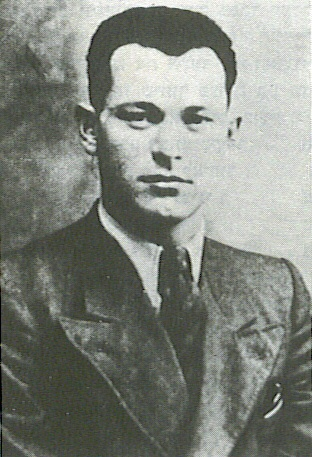
David Raziel, commander of the Irgun

While continuing to defend settlements, Irgun members began attacks on Arab villages around April 1936, thus ending the policy of restraint. These attacks were intended to instill fear in the Arab side, in order to cause the Arabs to wish for peace and quiet. In March 1938, David Raziel wrote in the underground newspaper "By the Sword" a constitutive article for the Irgun overall, in which he coined the term "Active Defense":

The actions of the Haganah alone will never be a true victory. If the goal of the war is to break the will of the enemy – and this cannot be attained without destroying his spirit – clearly we cannot be satisfied with solely defensive operations.... Such a method of defense, that allows the enemy to attack at will, to reorganize and attack again ... and does not intend to remove the enemy's ability to attack a second time – is called passive defense, and ends in downfall and destruction ... whoever does not wish to be beaten has no choice but to attack. The fighting side, that does not intend to oppress but to save its liberty and honor, he too has only one way available – the way of attack. Defensiveness by way of offensiveness, in order to deprive the enemy the option of attacking, is called active defense.

By the end of World War II, more than 250 Arabs had been killed. During 1936, Irgun members carried out approximately ten attacks. Throughout 1937 the Irgun continued this line of operation.

At that time, however, these acts were not yet a part of a formulated policy of the Irgun. Not all of the aforementioned operations received a commander's approval, and Jabotinsky was not in favor of such actions at the time. Jabotinsky still hoped to establish a Jewish force out in the open that would not have to operate underground. However, the failure, in its eyes, of the Peel Commission and the renewal of violence on the part of the Arabs caused the Irgun to rethink its official policy.

=== Increase in operations ===
14 November 1937 was a watershed in Irgun activity. From that date, the Irgun increased its reprisals. Following an increase in the number of attacks aimed at Jews, including the killing of five kibbutz members near Kiryat Anavim (today kibbutz Ma'ale HaHamisha), the Irgun undertook a series of attacks in various places in Jerusalem, killing five Arabs. Operations were also undertaken in Haifa (shooting at the Arab-populated Wadi Nisnas neighborhood) and in Herzliya. The date is known as the day the policy of restraint (Havlagah) ended, or as Black Sunday when operations resulted in the murder of 10 Arabs. This is when the organization fully changed its policy, with the approval of Jabotinsky and Headquarters to the policy of "active defense" in respect of Irgun actions.

The British responded with the arrest of Betar and Hatzohar members as suspected members of the Irgun. Military courts were allowed to act under "Time of Emergency Regulations" and even sentence people to death. In this manner Yehezkel Altman, a guard in a Betar battalion in the Nahalat Yizchak neighborhood of Tel Aviv, shot at an Arab bus, without his commanders' knowledge. Altman was acting in response to a shooting at Jewish vehicles on the Tel Aviv–Jerusalem road the day before. He turned himself in later and was sentenced to death, a sentence which was later commuted to a life sentence.

Despite the arrests, Irgun members continued fighting. Jabotinsky lent his moral support to these activities. In a letter to Moshe Rosenberg on 18 March 1938 he wrote:

Tell them: from afar I collect and save, as precious treasures, news items about your lives. I know of the obstacles that have not impeded your spirit; and I know of your actions as well. I am overjoyed that I have been blessed with such students.

Although the Irgun continued activities such as these, following Rosenberg's orders, they were greatly curtailed. Furthermore, in fear of the British threat of the death sentence for anyone found carrying a weapon, all operations were suspended for eight months. However, opposition to this policy gradually increased. In April 1938, in retaliation for the killing of six Jews, three members of the Irgun, acting without the consent of their regional commander, conducted an unauthorized ambush on an Arab bus near Safed. The attackers attempted to force the vehicle off the mountain road using firearms and a grenade; however, the grenade failed to detonate, and the bus escaped.

Although the incident ended without casualties, the three were caught, and one of them, Shlomo Ben-Yosef, was sentenced to death. Demonstrations around the country, as well as pressure from institutions and people such as Dr. Chaim Weizmann and the Chief Rabbi of Mandatory Palestine, Yitzhak HaLevi Herzog did not reduce his sentence. In Shlomo Ben-Yosef's writings in Hebrew were later found:

I am going to die and I am not sorry at all. Why? Because I am going to die for our country. Shlomo Ben-Yosef.

On 29 June 1938 he was executed, and was the first of the Olei Hagardom. The Irgun revered him after his death and many regarded him as an example. In light of this, and due to the anger of the Irgun leadership over the decision to adopt a policy of restraint until that point, Jabotinsky relieved Rosenberg of his post and replaced him with David Raziel, who proved to be the most prominent Irgun commander until Menachem Begin. Jabotinsky simultaneously instructed the Irgun to end its policy of restraint, leading to armed offensive operations until the end of the Arab Revolt in 1939. In this time, the Irgun mounted about 40 operations against Arabs and Arab villages, for instance:

- After a Jewish father and son were killed in the Old City of Jerusalem, on June 6, 1938, Irgun members threw explosives from the roof of a nearby house, killing two Arabs and injuring four.
- The Irgun planted land mines in a number of Arab markets, primarily in places identified by the Irgun as activity centers of armed Arab gangs.
- Explosives detonated in the Arab souk in Jerusalem on July 15, killed ten local Arabs.
- In similar circumstances, 70 Arabs were killed by a land mine planted in the Arab souk in Haifa.

This action led the British Parliament to discuss the disturbances in Palestine. On 23 February 1939 the Secretary of State for the Colonies, Malcolm MacDonald revealed the British intention to cancel the mandate and establish a state that would preserve Arab rights. This caused a wave of riots and attacks by Arabs against Jews. The Irgun responded four days later with a series of attacks on Arab buses and other sites. The British used military force against the Arab rioters and in the latter stages of the revolt by the Arab community in Palestine, it deteriorated into a series of internal gang wars.

==== During the same period ====
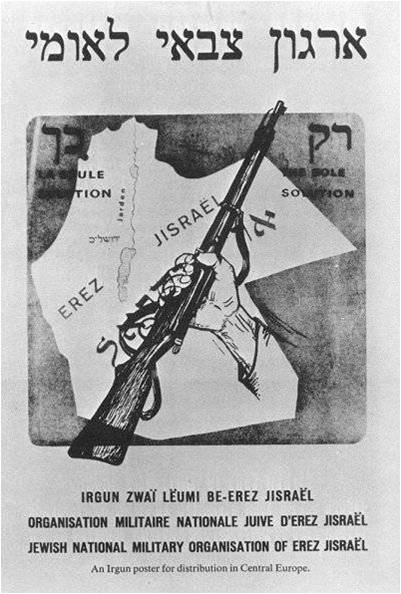
1931 propaganda poster of the Irgun for distribution in central Europe – the map shows Israel defined in the borders of both Mandatory Palestine and the Emirate of Transjordan, which the Irgun claimed in its entirety for a future Jewish state.

At the same time, the Irgun also established itself in Europe. The Irgun built underground cells that participated in organizing migration to Palestine. The cells were made up almost entirely of Betar members, and their primary activity was military training in preparation for emigration to Palestine. Ties formed with the Polish authorities brought about courses in which Irgun commanders were trained by Polish officers in advanced military issues such as guerrilla warfare, tactics and laying land mines. Avraham (Yair) Stern was notable among the cell organizers in Europe. In 1937 the Polish authorities began to deliver large amounts of weapons to the underground. According to Irgun activists Poland supplied the organization with 25,000 rifles, and additional material and weapons, by summer 1939 the Warsaw warehouses of Irgun held 5,000 rifles and 1,000 machine guns. The training and support by Poland would allow the organization to mobilize 30,000–40,000 men. The transfer of handguns, rifles, explosives and ammunition stopped with the outbreak of World War II. Another field in which the Irgun operated was the training of pilots, so they could serve in the Air Force in the future war for independence, in the flight school in Lod.

Towards the end of 1938 there was progress towards aligning the ideologies of the Irgun and the Haganah. Many abandoned the belief that the land would be divided and a Jewish state would soon exist. The Haganah founded פו"מ, a special operations unit, (pronounced poom), which carried out reprisal attacks following Arab violence. These operations continued into 1939. Furthermore, the opposition within the Yishuv to illegal immigration significantly decreased, and the Haganah began to bring Jews to Palestine using rented ships, as the Irgun had in the past.

=== First operations against the British ===
The publishing of the MacDonald White Paper of 1939 brought with it new edicts that were intended to lead to a more equitable settlement between Jews and Arabs. However, it was considered by some Jews to have an adverse effect on the continued development of the Jewish community in Palestine. Chief among these was the prohibition on selling land to Jews, and the smaller quotas for Jewish immigration. The entire Yishuv was furious at the contents of the White Paper. There were demonstrations against the "Treacherous Paper", as it was considered that it would preclude the establishment of a Jewish homeland in Palestine.

Under the temporary command of Hanoch Kalai, the Irgun began sabotaging strategic infrastructure such as electricity facilities, radio and telephone lines. It also started publicizing its activity and its goals. This was done in street announcements, newspapers, as well as the underground radio station Kol Zion HaLochemet. On August 26, 1939, the Irgun killed Ralph Cairns, a British police officer who, as head of the Jewish Department in the Palestine Police, had been closing the net on Avraham Stern. Irgun had accused him of the torture of a number of its members. Cairns and Ronald Barker, another British police officer, were killed by a remotely detonated Irgun landmine.

The British increased their efforts against the Irgun. As a result, on August 31 the British police arrested members meeting in the Irgun headquarters. On the next day, September 1, 1939, World War II broke out.

== During World War II ==
Following the outbreak of war, Ze'ev Jabotinsky and the New Zionist Organization voiced their support for Britain and France. In mid-September 1939 Raziel was moved from his place of detention in Tzrifin. This, among other events, encouraged the Irgun to announce a cessation of its activities against the British so as not to hinder Britain's effort to fight "the Hebrew's greatest enemy in the world – German Nazism". This announcement ended with the hope that after the war a Hebrew state would be founded "within the historical borders of the liberated homeland". After this announcement Irgun, Betar and Hatzohar members, including Raziel and the Irgun leadership, were gradually released from detention. The Irgun did not rule out joining the British military. Irgun members did enlist in various British units. Irgun members also assisted British forces with intelligence in Romania, Bulgaria, Morocco and Tunisia. An Irgun unit also operated in Syria and Lebanon. David Raziel later died during one of these operations.

During the Holocaust, Betar members revolted numerous times against the Nazis in occupied Europe. The largest of these revolts was the Warsaw Ghetto Uprising, in which an armed underground organization fought, formed by Betar and Hatzoar and known as the Żydowski Związek Wojskowy (ŻZW) (Jewish Military Union). Despite its political origins, the ŻZW accepted members without regard to political affiliation, and had contacts established before the war with elements of the Polish military. Because of differences over objectives and strategy, the ŻZW was unable to form a common front with the mainstream ghetto fighters of the Żydowska Organizacja Bojowa, and fought independently under the military leadership of Paweł Frenkiel and the political leadership of Dawid Wdowiński.

From 1939 onwards, an Irgun delegation in the United States worked for the creation of a Jewish army made up of Jewish refugees and Jews from Palestine, to fight alongside the Allied Forces. In July 1943 the "Emergency Committee to Save the Jewish People in Europe" was formed, and worked until the end of the war to rescue the Jews of Europe from the Nazis and to garner public support for a Jewish state. However, it was not until January 1944 that US President Franklin Roosevelt established the War Refugee Board, which achieved some success in saving European Jews.

=== Second split ===
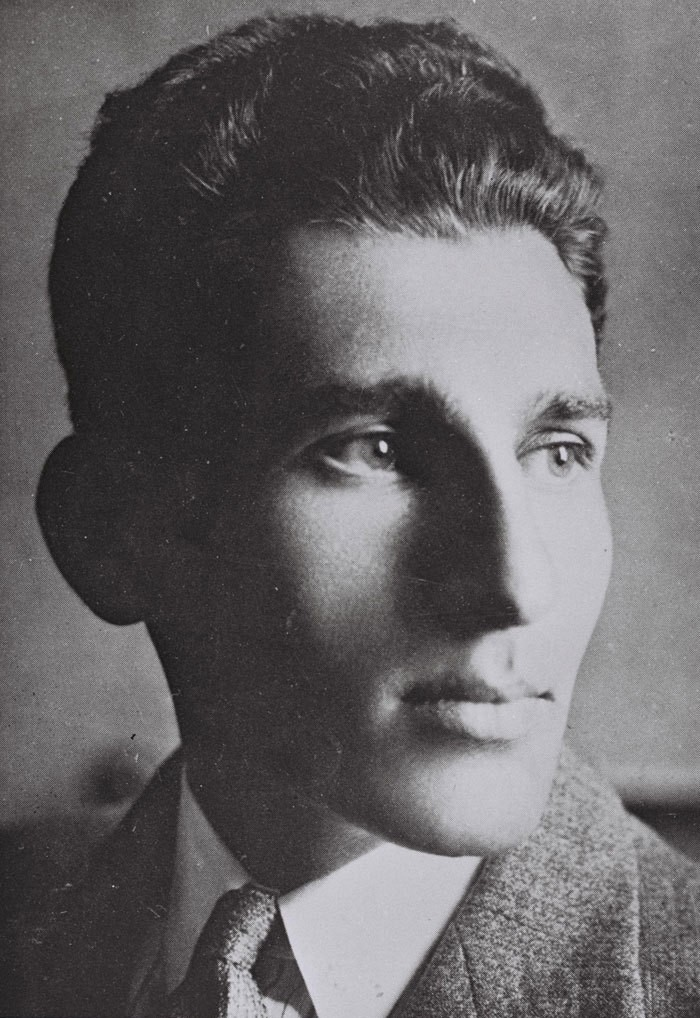
Avraham (Yair) Stern

Throughout this entire period, the British continued enforcing the White Paper's provisions, which included a ban on the sale of land, restrictions on Jewish immigration and increased vigilance against illegal immigration. Part of the reason why the British banned land sales (to anyone) was the confused state of the post Ottoman land registry; it was difficult to determine who actually owned the land that was for sale.

Within the ranks of the Irgun this created much disappointment and unrest, at the center of which was disagreement with the leadership of the New Zionist Organization, David Raziel and the Irgun Headquarters. On June 18, 1939, Avraham (Yair) Stern and others of the leadership were released from prison and a rift opened between them the Irgun and Hatzohar leadership. The controversy centred on the issues of the underground movement submitting to public political leadership and fighting the British. On his release from prison Raziel resigned from Headquarters. To his chagrin, independent operations of senior members of the Irgun were carried out and some commanders even doubted Raziel's loyalty.

In his place, Stern was elected to the leadership. In the past, Stern had founded secret Irgun cells in Poland without Jabotinsky's knowledge, in opposition to his wishes. Furthermore, Stern was in favor of removing the Irgun from the authority of the New Zionist Organization, whose leadership urged Raziel to return to the command of the Irgun. He finally consented. Jabotinsky wrote to Raziel and to Stern, and these letters were distributed to the branches of the Irgun:

... I call upon you: Let nothing disturb our unity. Listen to the commissioner (Raziel), whom I trust, and promise me that you and Betar, the greatest of my life's achievements, will stand strong and united and allow me to continue with the hope for victory in the war to realize our old Maccabean dream....

Stern was sent a telegram with an order to obey Raziel, who was reappointed. However, these events did not prevent the splitting of the organization. Suspicion and distrust were rampant among the members. Out of the Irgun a new organization was created on July 17, 1940, which was first named "The National Military Organization in Israel" (as opposed to the "National Military Organization in the Land of Israel") and later on changed its name to Lehi, an acronym for Lohamei Herut Israel, "Fighters for the Freedom of Israel", (לח"י – לוחמי חירות ישראל). Jabotinsky died in New York on August 4, 1940, yet this did not prevent the Lehi split. Following Jabotinsky's death, ties were formed between the Irgun and the New Zionist Organization. These ties would last until 1944, when the Irgun declared a revolt against the British.

The primary difference between the Irgun and the newly formed organization was its intention to fight the British in Palestine, regardless of their war against Germany. Later, additional operational and ideological differences developed that contradicted some of the Irgun's guiding principles. For example, the Lehi, unlike the Irgun, supported a population exchange with local Arabs.

=== Change of policy ===
The Irgun's Anthem

Tagar -
Through all obstacles and enemies
Whether you go up or down
In the flames of revolt
Carry a flame to kindle – never mind!
For silence is filth
Worthless is blood and soul
For the sake of the hidden glory

To die or to conquer the hill -
Yodefet, Masada, Betar.

The split damaged the Irgun both organizationally and from a morale point of view. As their spiritual leader, Jabotinsky's death also added to this feeling. Together, these factors brought about a mass abandonment by members. The British took advantage of this weakness to gather intelligence and arrest Irgun activists. The new Irgun leadership, which included Meridor, Yerachmiel Ha'Levi, Rabbi Moshe Zvi Segal and others used the forced hiatus in activity to rebuild the injured organization. This period was also marked by more cooperation between the Irgun and the Jewish Agency, however David Ben-Gurion's uncompromising demand that Irgun accept the Agency's command foiled any further cooperation.

In both the Irgun and the Haganah more voices were being heard opposing any cooperation with the British. Nevertheless, an Irgun operation carried out in the service of Britain was aimed at sabotaging pro-Nazi forces in Iraq, including the assassination of Haj Amin al-Husayni. Among others, Raziel and Yaakov Meridor participated. On April 20, 1941, during a Luftwaffe air raid on RAF Habbaniya near Baghdad, David Raziel, commander of the Irgun, was killed during the operation.

In late 1943 a joint Haganah – Irgun initiative was developed, to form a single fighting body, unaligned with any political party, by the name of עם לוחם (Fighting Nation). The new body's first plan was to kidnap the British High Commissioner of Palestine, Sir Harold MacMichael and take him to Cyprus. However, the Haganah leaked the planned operation and it was thwarted before it got off the ground. Nevertheless, at this stage the Irgun ceased its cooperation with the British. As Eliyahu Lankin tells in his book:

Immediately following the failure of Fighting Nation practical discussions began in the Irgun Headquarters regarding a declaration of war.

== Revolt ==
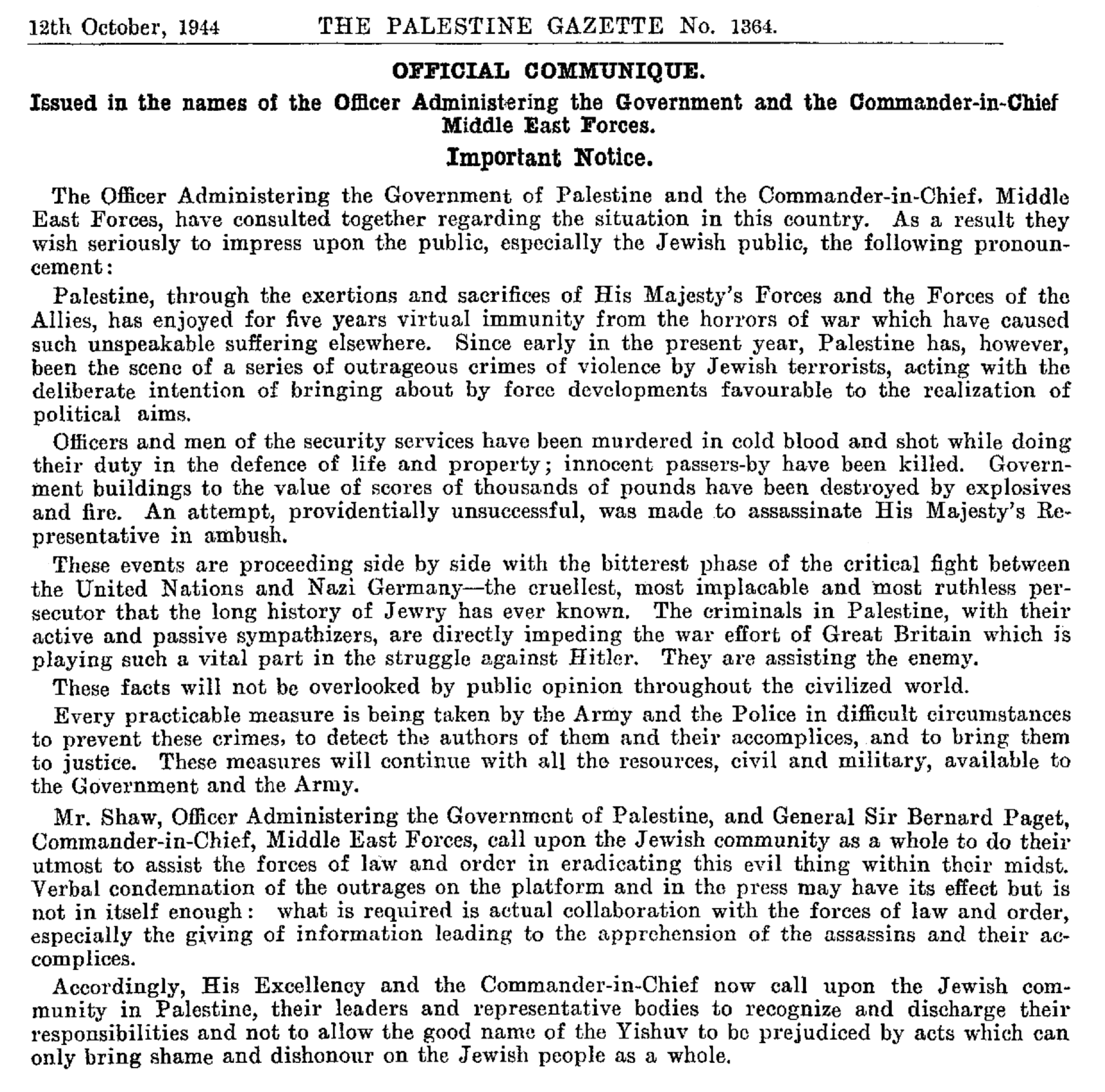
The British government accuses Jewish terrorists of assisting the Nazis by their attacks in Palestine while the war in Europe continued.

In 1943 the Polish II Corps, commanded by Władysław Anders, arrived in Palestine from Iraq. The British insisted that no Jewish units of the army be created. Eventually, many of the soldiers of Jewish origin that arrived with the army were released and allowed to stay in Palestine. One of them was Menachem Begin, whose arrival in Palestine created new-found expectations within the Irgun and Betar. Begin had served as head of the Betar movement in Poland, and was a respected leader. Ya'akov Meridor, then the commander of the Irgun, raised the idea of appointing Begin to the post. In late 1943, when Begin accepted the position, a new leadership was formed. Meridor became Begin's deputy, and other members of the board were Aryeh Ben Eliezer, Eliyahu Lankin, and Shlomo Lev Ami.

Begin, who had studied the Irish and Indian independence movements, proceeded to begin planning an insurrection against British rule. By this time, it was clear that the defeat of Nazi Germany was only a matter of time and there was persistent frustration over British immigration restrictions. Begin's plan was to launch a series of guerrilla attacks that would damage British prestige, draw the world's attention and thus making Palestine what he referred to as a "glass house", and cause the British to respond with increasingly repressive measures that would turn the Yishuv against the authorities. Begin was certain that when faced with a choice between escalating repression or withdrawal, the British would choose to leave. So as not to harm the war effort against the Nazis, the Irgun would refrain from attacking military targets until the defeat of Germany, focusing only on administrative targets.

On February 1, 1944, the Irgun put up posters all around the country, proclaiming a revolt against the British mandatory government. The posters began by saying that all of the Zionist movements stood by the Allied Forces and over 25,000 Jews had enlisted in the British military. The hope to establish a Jewish army had died. European Jewry was trapped and was being destroyed, yet Britain, for its part, did not allow any rescue missions. This part of the document ends with the following words:

The White Paper is still in effect. It is enforced, despite the betrayal of the Arabs and the loyalty of the Jews; despite the mass enlisting to the British Army; despite the ceasefire and the quiet in The Land of Israel; despite the massacre of masses of the Jewish people in Europe....

The facts are simple and horrible as one. Over the last four years of the war we have lost millions of the best of our people; millions more are in danger of eradication. And The Land of Israel is closed off and quarantined because the British rule it, realizing the White Paper, and strives for the destruction of our people's last hope.

The Irgun then declared that, for its part, the ceasefire was over and they were now at war with the British. It demanded the transfer of rule to a Jewish government, to implement ten policies. Among these were the mass evacuation of Jews from Europe, the signing of treaties with any state that recognized the Jewish state's sovereignty, including Britain, granting social justice to the state's residents, and full equality to the Arab population. The proclamation ended with:

The God of Israel, God of Hosts, will be at our side. There is no retreat. Liberty or death.... The fighting youth will not recoil in the face of sacrifices and suffering, blood and torment. They will not surrender, so long as our days of old are not renewed, so long as our nation is not ensured a homeland, liberty, honor, bread, justice and law.

The Irgun began this campaign rather weakly. At the time of the start of the revolt, it was only about 1,000 strong, including some 200 fighters. It possessed about 4 submachine guns, 40 rifles, 60 pistols, 150 hand grenades, and 2,000 kilograms of explosive material, and its funds were about £800.

=== Struggle against the British ===
The Irgun began a militant operation against the symbols of government, in an attempt to harm the regime's operation as well as its reputation. The first attack was on February 12, 1944, at the government immigration offices, a symbol of the immigration laws. The attacks went smoothly and ended with no casualties – as they took place on a Saturday night, when the buildings were empty – in the three largest cities: Jerusalem, Tel Aviv, and Haifa. On February 27 the income tax offices were bombed. Parts of the same cities were blown up, also on a Saturday night; prior warnings were put up near the buildings. On March 23 the national headquarters building of the British police in the Russian Compound in Jerusalem was attacked, and part of it was blown up. These attacks in the first few months were sharply condemned by the organized leadership of the Yishuv and by the Jewish Agency, who saw them as dangerous provocations.

At the same time the Lehi also renewed its attacks against the British. The Irgun continued to attack police stations and headquarters, and Tegart Fort, a fortified police station (today the location of Latrun). One relatively complex operation was the takeover of the radio station in Ramallah, on May 17, 1944.

One symbolic act by the Irgun happened before Yom Kippur of 1944. They plastered notices around town, warning that no British officers should come to the Western Wall on Yom Kippur, and for the first time since the mandate began no British police officers were there to prevent the Jews from the traditional Shofar blowing at the end of the fast. After the fast that year the Irgun attacked four police stations in Arab settlements. In order to obtain weapons, the Irgun carried out "confiscation" operations – they robbed British armouries and smuggled stolen weapons to their own hiding places. During this phase of activity the Irgun also cut all of its official ties with the New Zionist Organization, so as not to tie their fate in the underground organization.

Begin wrote in his memoirs, The Revolt:

History and experience taught us that if we are able to destroy the prestige of the British in Palestine, the regime will break. Since we found the enslaving government's weak point, we did not let go of it.

=== Underground exiles ===
In October 1944 the British began expelling hundreds of arrested Irgun and Lehi members to detention camps in Africa. 251 detainees from Latrun were flown on thirteen planes, on October 19 to a camp in Asmara, Eritrea. Eleven additional transports were made. Throughout the period of their detention, the detainees often initiated rebellions and hunger strikes. Many escape attempts were made until July 1948 when the exiles were returned to Israel. While there were numerous successful escapes from the camp itself, only nine men actually made it back all the way. One noted success was that of Yaakov Meridor, who escaped nine times before finally reaching Europe in April 1948. These tribulations were the subject of his book Long is the Path to Freedom: Chronicles of one of the Exiles.

=== Hunting Season ===
On November 6, 1944, Lord Moyne, British Deputy Resident Minister of State in Cairo was assassinated by Lehi members Eliyahu Hakim and Eliyahu Bet-Zuri. This act raised concerns within the Yishuv from the British regime's reaction to the underground's violent acts against them. Therefore, the Jewish Agency decided on starting a Hunting Season, known as the saison, (from the French "la saison de chasse").

The Irgun's recuperation was noticeable when it began to renew its cooperation with the Lehi in May 1945, when it sabotaged oil pipelines, telephone lines and railroad bridges. All in all, over 1,000 members of the Irgun and Lehi were arrested and interned in British camps during the Saison. Eventually the Hunting Season died out, and there was even talk of cooperation with the Haganah leading to the formation of the Jewish Resistance Movement.

=== Jewish Resistance Movement ===
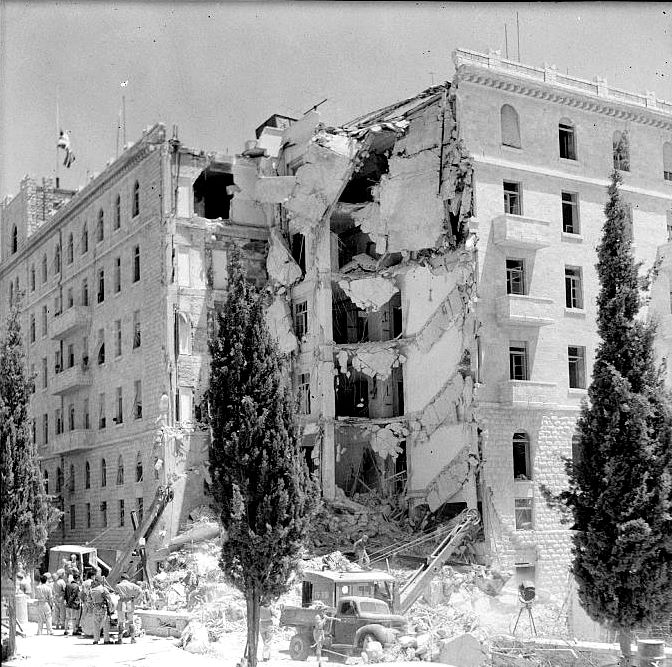
The King David Hotel after the bombing, photo from The Palestine Post

Towards the end of July 1945 the Labour Party in Britain was elected to power. The Yishuv leadership had high hopes that this would change the anti-Zionist policy that the British maintained at the time. However, these hopes were quickly dashed when the government limited Jewish immigration, with the intention that the population of Mandatory Palestine (the land west of the Jordan River) would not be more than one-third of the total. This, along with the stepping up of arrests and their pursuit of underground members and illegal immigration organizers led to the formation of the Jewish Resistance Movement. This body consolidated the armed resistance to the British of the Irgun, Lehi, and Haganah. For ten months the Irgun and the Lehi cooperated and they carried out nineteen attacks and defense operations. The Haganah and Palmach carried out ten such operations. The Haganah also assisted in landing 13,000 illegal immigrants.

Tension between the underground movements and the British increased with the increase in operations. On April 23, 1946, an operation undertaken by the Irgun to gain weapons from the Tegart fort at Ramat Gan resulted in a firefight with the police in which an Arab constable and two Irgun fighters were killed, including one who jumped on an explosive device to save his comrades. A third fighter, Dov Gruner, was wounded and captured. He stood trial and was sentenced to be death by hanging, refusing to sign a pardon request.

In 1946, British relations with the Yishuv worsened, building up to Operation Agatha of June 29. The authorities ignored the Anglo-American Committee of Inquiry's recommendation to allow 100,000 Jews into Palestine at once. As a result of the discovery of documents tying the Jewish Agency to the Jewish Resistance Movement, the Irgun was asked to speed up the plans for the King David Hotel bombing of July 22. The hotel was where the documents were located, the base for the British Secretariat, the military command and a branch of the Criminal Investigation Division of the police. The Irgun later claimed to have sent a warning that was ignored. Palestinian and U.S. sources confirm that the Irgun issued numerous warnings for civilians to evacuate the hotel prior to the bombing. 91 people were killed in the attack where a 350 kg bomb was placed in the basement of the hotel and caused a large section of it to collapse. Only 13 were British soldiers.

=== Further struggle against the British ===
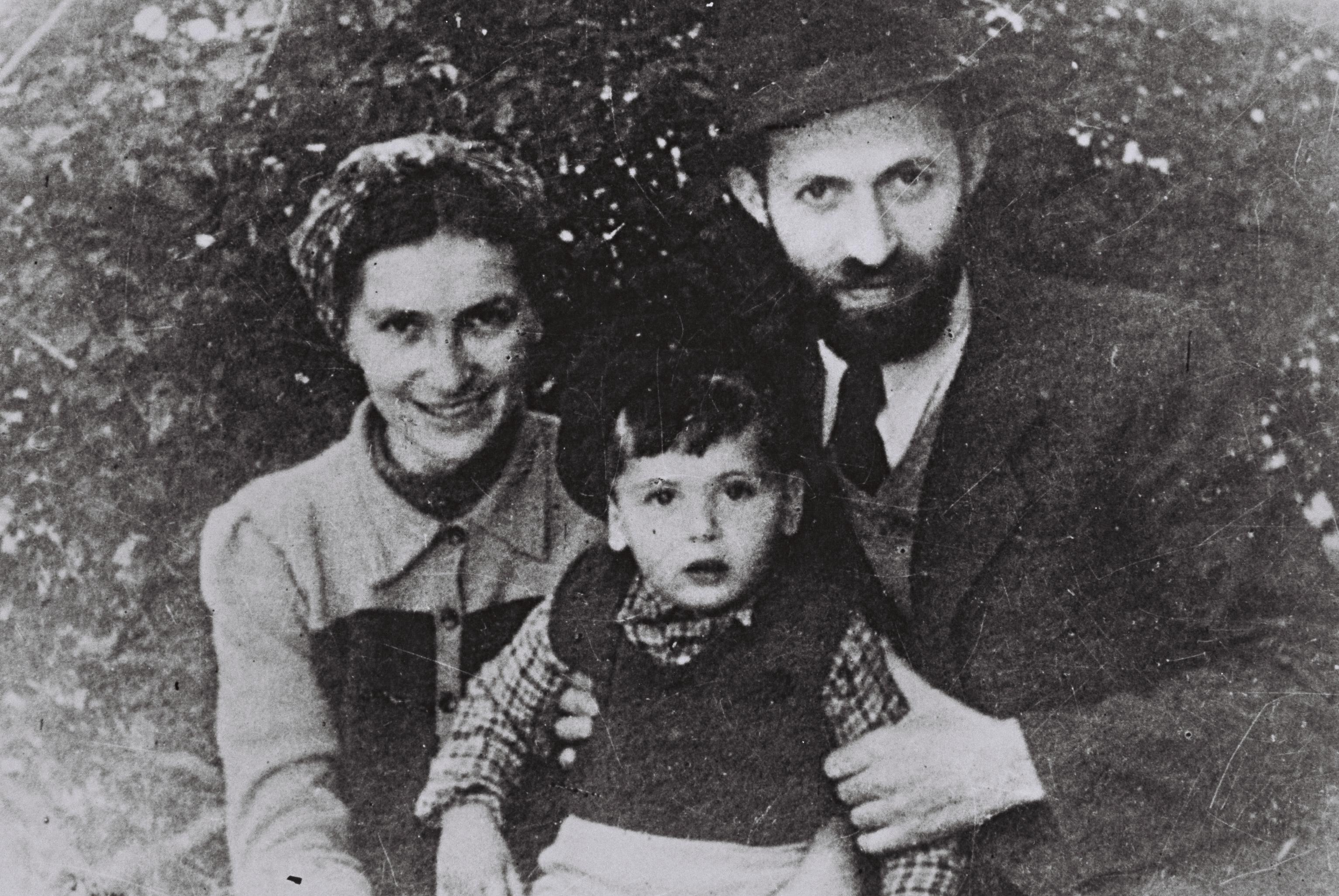
Menachem Begin as "Rabbi Sassover", with wife Aliza and son Benyamin-Zeev, Tel Aviv, December 1946

The King David Hotel bombing and the arrest of Jewish Agency and other Yishuv leaders as part of Operation Agatha caused the Haganah to cease their armed activity against the British. Yishuv and Jewish Agency leaders were released from prison. From then until the end of the British mandate, resistance activities were led by the Irgun and Lehi. In early September 1946 the Irgun renewed its attacks against civil structures, railroads, communication lines and bridges. One operation was the attack on the train station in Jerusalem, in which Meir Feinstein was arrested and later committed suicide awaiting execution. According to the Irgun these sorts of armed attacks were legitimate, since the trains primarily served the British, for redeployment of their forces. The Irgun also publicized leaflets, in three languages, not to use specific trains in danger of being attacked. For a while, the British stopped train traffic at night. The Irgun also carried out repeated attacks against military and police traffic using disguised, electronically detonated roadside mines which could be detonated by an operator hiding nearby as a vehicle passed, carried out arms raids against military bases and police stations (often disguised as British soldiers), launched bombing, shooting, and mortar attacks against military and police installations and checkpoints, and robbed banks to gain funds as a result of losing access to Haganah funding following the collapse of the Jewish Resistance Movement.

On October 31, 1946, in response to the British barring entry of Jews from Palestine, the Irgun blew up the British Embassy in Rome, a center of British efforts to monitor and stop Jewish immigration. The Irgun also carried out a few other operations in Europe: a British troop train was derailed and an attempt against another troop train failed. An attack on a British officers club in Vienna took place in 1947, and an attack on another British officer's club in Vienna and a sergeant's club in Germany took place in 1948.

In December 1946 a sentence of 18 years and 18 beatings was handed down to a young Irgun member for robbing a bank. The Irgun made good on a threat they made and after the detainee was whipped, Irgun members kidnapped British officers and beat them in public. The operation, known as the "Night of the Beatings" brought an end to British punitive beatings. The British, taking these acts seriously, moved many British families in Palestine into the confines of military bases, and some moved home.

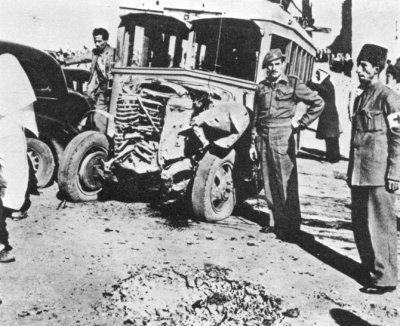
Arab bus after a bomb attack by the Irgun, 29 December 1947

On February 14, 1947, Ernest Bevin announced that the Jews and Arabs would not be able to agree on any British proposed solution for the land, and therefore the issue must be brought to the United Nations (UN) for a final decision. The Yishuv thought of the idea to transfer the issue to the UN as a British attempt to achieve delay while a UN inquiry commission would be established, and its ideas discussed, and all the while the Yishuv would weaken. Foundation for Immigration B increased the number of ships bringing in Jewish refugees. The British still strictly enforced the policy of limited Jewish immigration and illegal immigrants were placed in detention camps in Cyprus, which increased the anger of the Jewish community towards the mandate government.

The Irgun stepped up its activity and from February 19 until March 3 it attacked 18 British military camps, convoy routes, vehicles, and other facilities. The most notable of these attacks was the bombing of a British officer's club located in Goldsmith House in Jerusalem, which was in a heavily guarded security zone. Covered by machine-gun fire, an Irgun assault team in a truck penetrated the security zone and lobbed explosives into the building. Thirteen people, including two officers, were killed. As a result, martial law was imposed over much of the country, enforced by approximately 20,000 British soldiers. Despite this, attacks continued throughout the martial law period. The most notable one was an Irgun attack against the Royal Army Pay Corps base at the Schneller Orphanage, in which a British soldier was killed.

Throughout its struggle against the British, the Irgun sought to publicize its cause around the world. By humiliating the British, it attempted to focus global attention on Palestine, hoping that any British overreaction would be widely reported, and thus result in more political pressure against the British. Begin described this strategy as turning Palestine into a "glass house". The Irgun also re-established many representative offices internationally, and by 1948 operated in 23 states. In these countries, the Irgun sometimes acted against the local British representatives or led public relations campaigns against Britain. According to Bruce Hoffman: "In an era long before the advent of 24/7 global news coverage and instantaneous satellite-transmitted broadcasts, the Irgun deliberately attempted to appeal to a worldwide audience far beyond the immediate confines of its local struggle, and beyond even the ruling regime's own homeland."

Executed Members of the Irgun
- Shlomo Ben-Yosef
- Dov Gruner
- Mordechai Alkahi
- Yehiel Dresner
- Eliezer Kashani
- Yaakov Weiss
- Avshalom Haviv
- Meir Nakar

=== Acre Prison break ===
On April 16, 1947, Irgun members Dov Gruner, Yehiel Dresner, Eliezer Kashani, and Mordechai Alkahi were hanged in Acre Prison, while singing Hatikvah. On April 21 Meir Feinstein and Lehi member Moshe Barazani blew themselves up, using a smuggled grenade, hours before their scheduled hanging. And on May 4 one of the Irgun's largest operations took place – the raid on Acre Prison. The operation was carried out by 23 men, commanded by Dov Cohen – AKA "Shimshon", along with the help of the Irgun and Lehi prisoners inside the prison. The Irgun had informed them of the plan in advance and smuggled in explosives. After a hole was blasted in the prison wall, the 41 Irgun and Lehi members who had been chosen to escape then ran to the hole, blasting through inner prison gates with the smuggled explosives. Meanwhile, Irgun teams mined roads and launched a mortar attack on a nearby British Army camp to delay the arrival of responding British forces. Although the 41 escapees managed to get out of the prison and board the escape trucks, some were rapidly recaptured and nine of the escapees and attackers were killed. Five Irgun men in the attacking party were also captured. Overall, 27 of the 41 designated escapees managed to escape. Along with the underground movement members, other criminals – including 214 Arabs – also escaped. Of the five attackers who were caught, three of them – Avshalom Haviv, Meir Nakar, and Yaakov Weiss, were sentenced to death.

=== The Sergeants affair ===
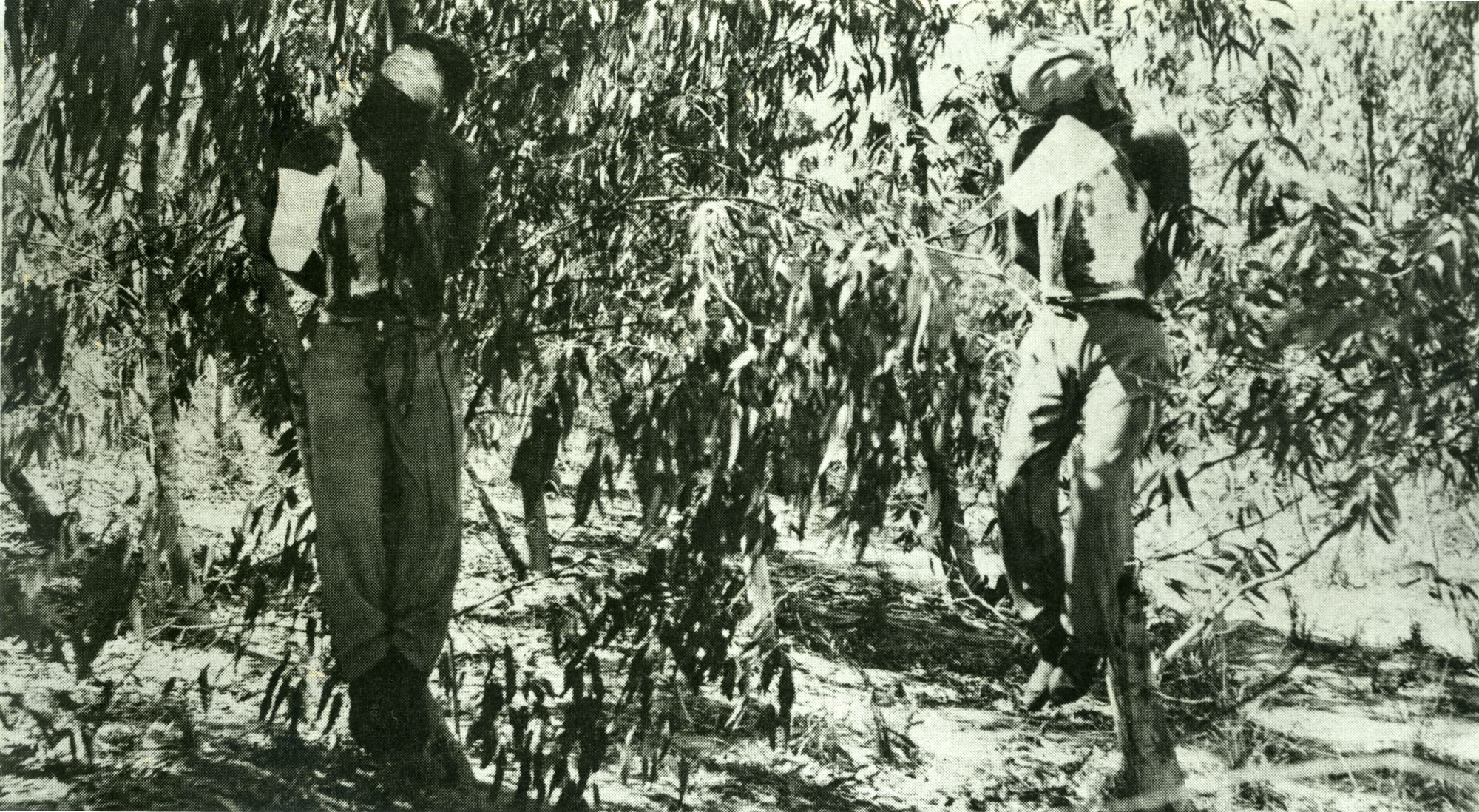
Two British sergeants hanged by the Irgun

After the death sentences of the three were confirmed, the Irgun tried to save them by kidnapping hostages – British sergeants Clifford Martin and Mervyn Paice – in the streets of Netanya. British forces closed off and combed the area in search of the two, but did not find them. On July 29, 1947, in the afternoon, Meir Nakar, Avshalom Haviv, and Yaakov Weiss were executed. Approximately thirteen hours later the hostages were hanged in retaliation by the Irgun and their bodies, booby-trapped with an explosive, afterwards strung up from trees in woodlands south of Netanya. This action caused an outcry in Britain and was condemned both there and by Jewish leaders in Palestine.

This episode has been given as a major influence on the British decision to terminate the Mandate and leave Palestine. The United Nations Special Committee on Palestine (UNSCOP) was also influenced by this and other actions. At the same time another incident was developing – the events of the ship Exodus 1947. The 4,500 Holocaust survivors on board were not allowed to enter Palestine. UNSCOP also covered the events. Some of its members were even present at Haifa port when the putative immigrants were forcefully removed from their ship (later found to have been rigged with an IED by some of its passengers) onto the deportation ships, and later commented that this strong image helped them press for an immediate solution for Jewish immigration and the question of Palestine.

Two weeks later, the House of Commons convened for a special debate on events in Palestine, and concluded that their soldiers should be withdrawn as soon as possible.

== 1948 Palestine War ==
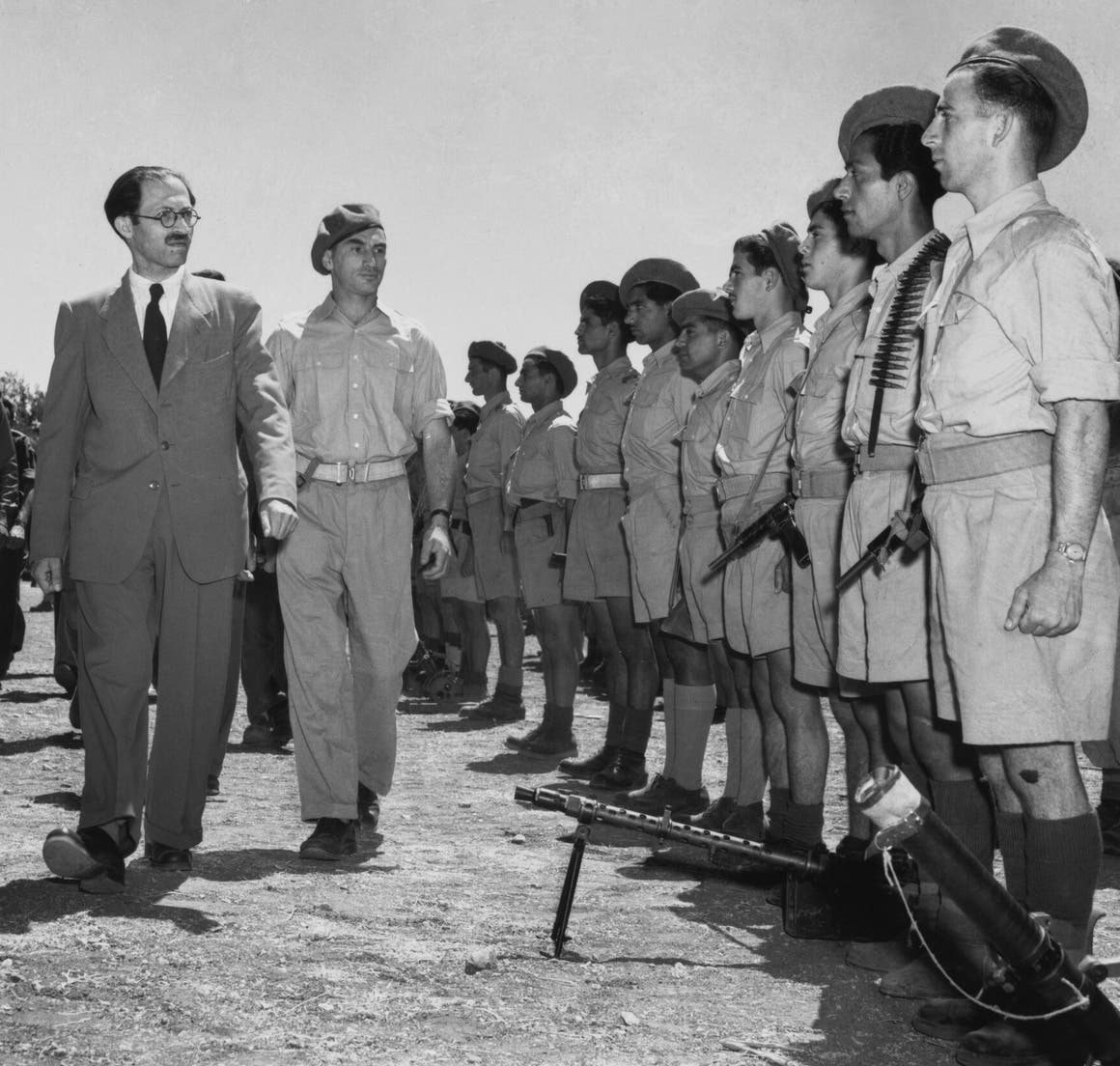
Menachem Begin (left) inspecting members of the Irgun in Jerusalem, August 1948.

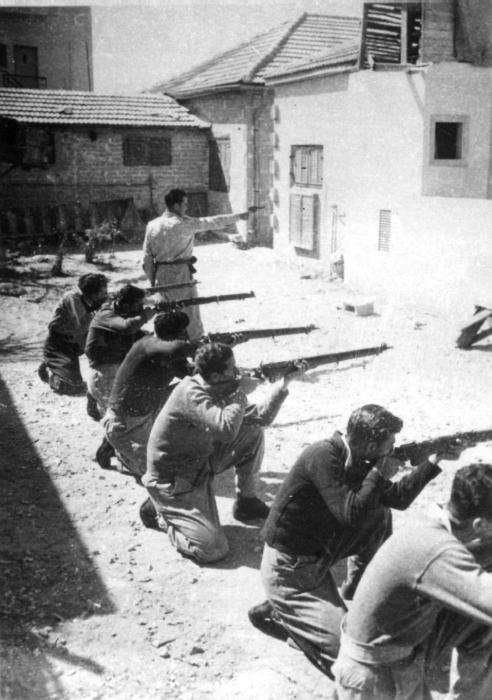
Irgun fighters training in 1947

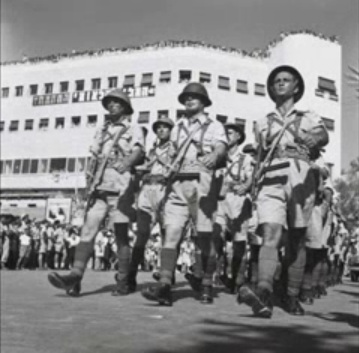
Irgun parade in 1948

UNSCOP's conclusion was a unanimous decision to end the British mandate, and a majority decision to divide Mandatory Palestine (the land west of the Jordan River) between a Jewish state and an Arab state. During the UN's deliberations regarding the committee's recommendations the Irgun avoided initiating any attacks, so as not to influence the UN negatively on the idea of a Jewish state. On November 29 the UN General Assembly voted in favor of ending the mandate and establishing two states on the land. That very same day the Irgun and the Lehi renewed their attacks on British targets. The next day the local Arabs began attacking the Jewish community, thus beginning the first stage of the 1948 Palestine War. The first attacks on Jews were in Jewish neighborhoods of Jerusalem, in and around Jaffa, and in Bat Yam, Holon, and the Ha'Tikvah neighborhood in Tel Aviv.

In the autumn of 1947, the Irgun had approximately 4,000 members. The goal of the organization at that point was the conquest of the land between the Jordan River and the Mediterranean Sea for the future Jewish state and preventing Arab forces from driving out the Jewish community. The Irgun became almost an overt organization, establishing military bases in Ramat Gan and Petah Tikva. It began recruiting openly, thus significantly increasing in size. During the war the Irgun fought alongside the Lehi and the Haganah in the front against the Arab attacks. At first the Haganah maintained a defensive policy, as it had until then, but after the Convoy of 35 incident it completely abandoned its policy of restraint: "Distinguishing between individuals is no longer possible, for now – it is a war, and even the innocent shall not be absolved."

The Irgun also began carrying out reprisal missions, as it had under David Raziel's command. At the same time though, it published announcements calling on the Arabs to lay down their weapons and maintain a ceasefire:

The National Military Organization has warned you, if the murderous attacks on Jewish civilians shall continue, its soldiers will penetrate your centers of activity and plague you. You have not heeded the warning. You continued to harm our brothers and murder them in wild cruelty. Therefore soldiers of the National Military Organization will go on the attack, as we have warned you.

... However even in these frenzied times, when Arab and Jewish blood is spilled at the British enslaver, we hereby call upon you ... to stop the attacks and create peace between us. We do not want a war with you. We are certain that neither do you want a war with us...

However, the mutual attacks continued. The Irgun attacked the Arab villages of Tira near Haifa, Yehudiya ('Abassiya) in the center, and Shuafat by Jerusalem. The Irgun also attacked in the Wadi Rushmiya neighborhood in Haifa and Abu Kabir in Jaffa. On December 29 Irgun units arrived by boat to the Jaffa shore and a gunfight between them and Arab gangs ensued. The following day a bomb was thrown from a speeding Irgun car at a group of Arab men waiting to be hired for the day at the Haifa oil refinery, resulting in seven Arabs killed, and dozens injured. In response, some Arab workers attacked Jews in the area, killing 41. This sparked a Haganah response in Balad al-Sheykh, which resulted in the deaths of 60 civilians. The Irgun's goal in the fighting was to move the battles from Jewish populated areas to Arab populated areas. On January 1, 1948, the Irgun attacked again in Jaffa, its men wearing British uniforms; later in the month it attacked in Beit Nabala, a base for many Arab fighters. On 5 January 1948 the Irgun detonated a lorry bomb outside Jaffa's Ottoman built Town Hall, killing 14 and injuring 19. In Jerusalem, two days later, Irgun members in a stolen police van rolled a barrel bomb into a large group of civilians who were waiting for a bus by the Jaffa Gate, killing around sixteen. In the pursuit that followed three of the attackers were killed and two taken prisoner.

On 6 April 1948, the Irgun raided the British Army camp at Pardes Hanna killing six British soldiers and their commanding officer.

The Deir Yassin massacre was carried out in a village west of Jerusalem that had signed a non-belligerency pact with its Jewish neighbors and the Haganah, and repeatedly had barred entry to foreign irregulars. On 9 April approximately 120 Irgun and Lehi members began an operation to capture the village. During the operation, the villagers fiercely resisted the attack, and a battle broke out. In the end, the Irgun and Lehi forces advanced gradually through house-to-house fighting. The village was only taken after the Irgun began systematically dynamiting houses, and after a Palmach unit intervened and employed mortar fire to silence the villagers' sniper positions. The operation resulted in five Jewish fighters dead and 40 injured. Some 100 to 120 villagers were also killed.

There are allegations that Irgun and Lehi forces committed war crimes during and after the capture of the village. These allegations include reports that fleeing individuals and families were fired at, and prisoners of war were killed after their capture. A Haganah report writes:

The conquest of the village was carried out with great cruelty. Whole families – women, old people, children – were killed. ... Some of the prisoners moved to places of detention, including women and children, were murdered viciously by their captors.

Some say that this incident was an event that accelerated the Arab exodus from Palestine.

The Irgun cooperated with the Haganah in the conquest of Haifa. At the regional commander's request, on April 21 the Irgun took over an Arab post above Hadar Ha'Carmel as well as the Arab neighborhood of Wadi Nisnas, adjacent to the Lower City.

The Irgun acted independently in the conquest of Jaffa (part of the proposed Arab State according to the UN Partition Plan). On April 25 Irgun units, about 600 strong, left the Irgun base in Ramat Gan towards Arab Jaffa. Difficult battles ensued, and the Irgun faced resistance from the Arabs as well as the British. Under the command of Amichai "Gidi" Paglin, the Irgun's chief operations officer, the Irgun captured the neighborhood of Manshiya, which threatened the city of Tel Aviv. Afterwards the force continued to the sea, towards the area of the port, and using mortars, shelled the southern neighborhoods.

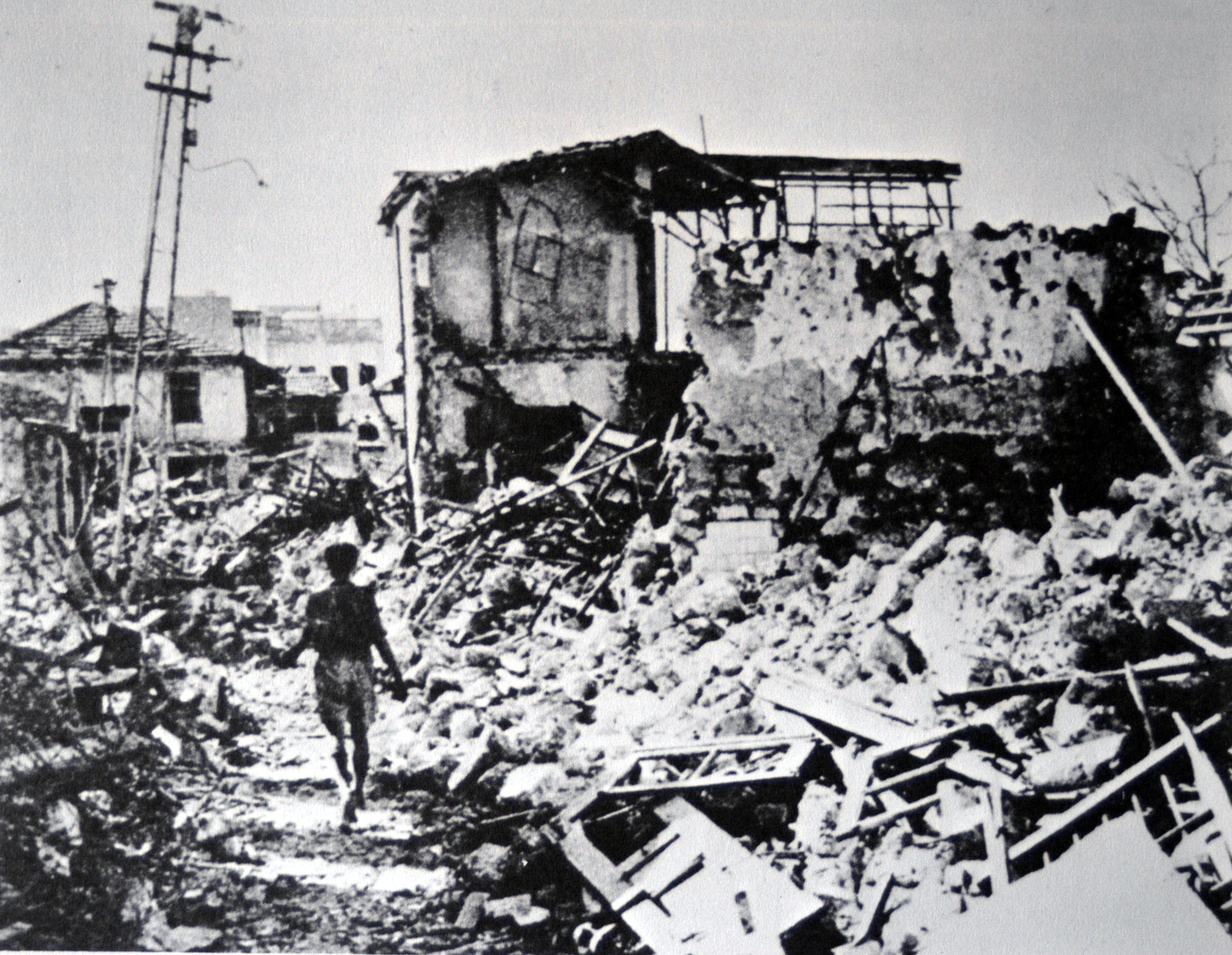
The Manshiya quarter between Jaffa and Tel Aviv after the Irgun mortar bombardment.

In his report concerning the fall of Jaffa the local Arab military commander, Michel Issa, wrote: "Continuous shelling with mortars of the city by Jews for four days, beginning 25 April, [...] caused inhabitants of city, unaccustomed to such bombardment, to panic and flee." According to Morris the shelling was done by the Irgun. Their objective was "to prevent constant military traffic in the city, to break the spirit of the enemy troops [and] to cause chaos among the civilian population in order to create a mass flight." High Commissioner Cunningham wrote a few days later "It should be made clear that IZL attack with mortars was indiscriminate and designed to create panic among the civilian inhabitants." The British demanded the evacuation of the newly conquered city, and militarily intervened, ending the Irgun offensive. Heavy British shelling against Irgun positions in Jaffa failed to dislodge them, and when British armor pushed into the city, the Irgun resisted; a bazooka team managed to knock out one tank, buildings were blown up and collapsed onto the streets as the armor advanced, and Irgun men crawled up and tossed live dynamite sticks onto the tanks. The British withdrew, and opened negotiations with the Jewish authorities. An agreement was worked out, under which Operation Hametz would be stopped and the Haganah would not attack Jaffa until the end of the Mandate. The Irgun would evacuate Manshiya, with Haganah fighters replacing them. British troops would patrol its southern end and occupy the police fort. The Irgun had previously agreed with the Haganah that British pressure would not lead to withdrawal from Jaffa and that custody of captured areas would be turned over to the Haganah. The city ultimately fell on May 13 after Haganah forces entered the city and took control of the rest of the city, from the south – part of the Hametz Operation which included the conquest of a number of villages in the area. The battles in Jaffa were a great victory for the Irgun. This operation was the largest in the history of the organization, which took place in a highly built up area that had many militants in shooting positions. During the battles explosives were used in order to break into homes and continue forging a way through them. Furthermore, this was the first occasion in which the Irgun had directly fought British forces, reinforced with armor and heavy weaponry. The city began these battles with an Arab population estimated at 70,000, which shrank to some 4,100 Arab residents by the end of major hostilities. Since the Irgun captured the neighborhood of Manshiya on its own, causing the flight of many of Jaffa's residents, the Irgun took credit for the conquest of Jaffa. It had lost 42 dead and about 400 wounded during the battle.

== Integration with the IDF and the Altalena Affair ==
On May 14, 1948 the establishment of the State of Israel was proclaimed. The declaration of independence was followed by the establishment of the Israel Defense Forces (IDF), and the process of absorbing all military organizations into the IDF started. On June 1, an agreement had been signed between Menachem Begin and Yisrael Galili for the absorption of the Irgun into the IDF. One of the clauses stated that the Irgun had to stop smuggling arms. Meanwhile, in France, Irgun representatives purchased a ship, renamed Altalena (a pseudonym of Ze'ev Jabotinsky), and weapons. The ship sailed on June 11 and arrived at the Israeli coast on June 20, during the first truce of the 1948 Arab–Israeli War. Despite United Nations Security Council Resolution 50 declaring an arms embargo in the region, neither side respected it.

When the ship arrived the Israeli government, headed by Ben-Gurion, was adamant in its demand that the Irgun surrender and hand over all of the weapons. Ben-Gurion said: "We must decide whether to hand over power to Begin or to order him to cease his activities. If he does not do so, we will open fire! Otherwise, we must decide to disperse our own army."

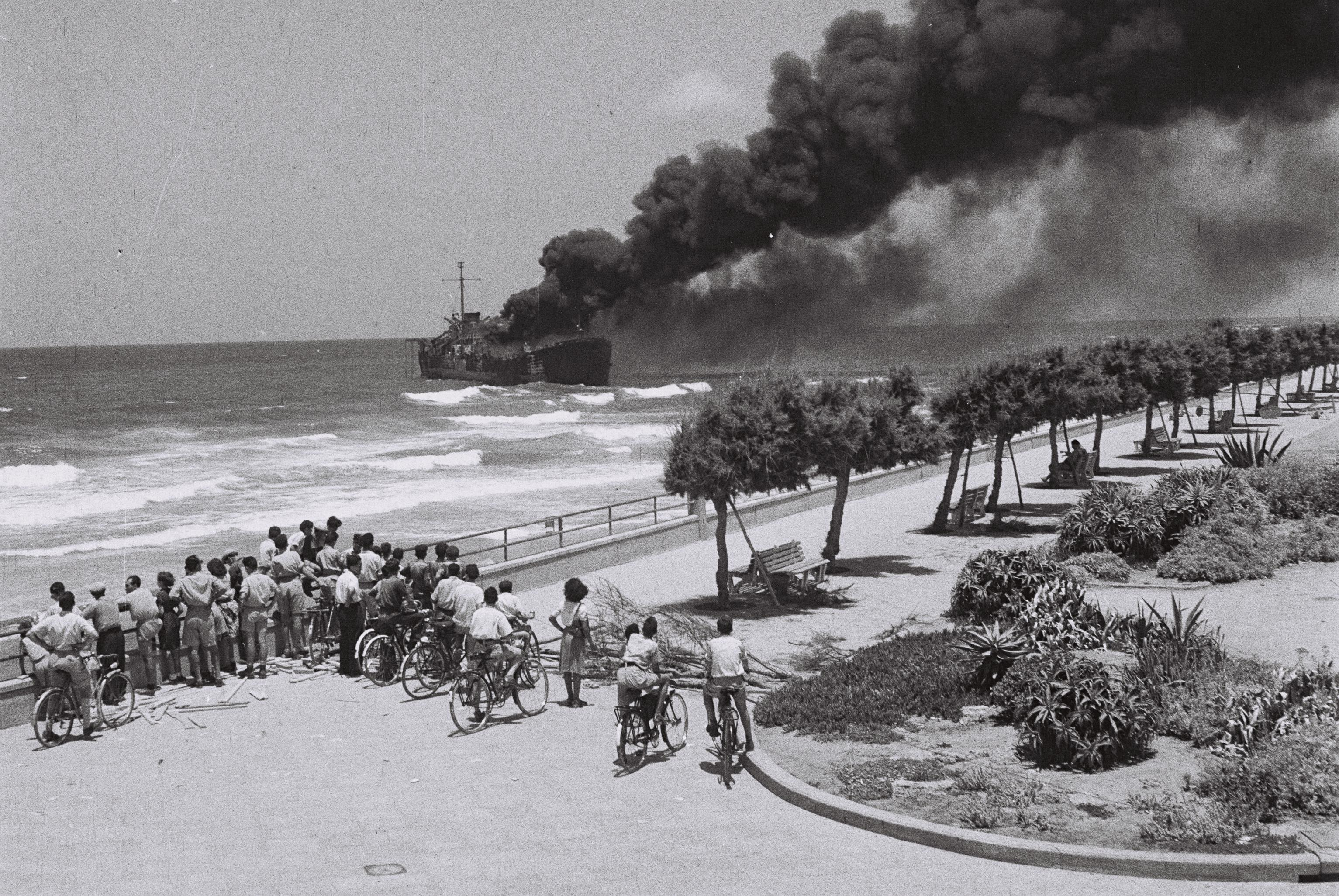
Altalena on fire after the Israeli government quelling of the Irgun's attempt to smuggle weapons

There were two confrontations between the newly formed IDF and the Irgun: when Altalena reached Kfar Vitkin in the late afternoon of Sunday, June 20 many Irgun militants, including Begin, waited on the shore. A clash with the Alexandroni Brigade, commanded by Dan Even (Epstein), occurred. Fighting ensued and there were a number of casualties on both sides. The clash ended in a ceasefire and the transfer of the weapons on shore to the local IDF commander, and with the ship, now reinforced with local Irgun members, including Begin, sailing to Tel Aviv, where the Irgun had more supporters. Many Irgun members, who joined the IDF earlier that month, left their bases and concentrated on the Tel Aviv beach. A confrontation between them and the IDF units started. In response, Ben-Gurion ordered Yigael Yadin (acting Chief of Staff) to concentrate large forces on the Tel Aviv beach and to take the ship by force. Heavy guns were transferred to the area and at four in the afternoon, Ben-Gurion ordered the shelling of the Altalena. One of the shells hit the ship, which began to burn. Sixteen Irgun fighters were killed in the confrontation with the army; six were killed in the Kfar Vitkin area and ten on Tel Aviv beach. Three IDF soldiers were killed: two at Kfar Vitkin and one in Tel Aviv.

After the shelling of the Altalena, more than 200 Irgun fighters were arrested. Most of them were freed several weeks later. The Irgun militants were then fully integrated with the IDF and not kept in separate units.

The initial agreement for the integration of the Irgun into the IDF did not include Jerusalem, where a small remnant of the Irgun called the Jerusalem Battalion, numbering around 400 fighters, and Lehi, continued to operate independently of the government. Following the assassination of UN Envoy for Peace Folke Bernadotte by Lehi in September 1948, the Israeli government determined to immediately dismantle the underground organizations. An ultimatum was issued to the Irgun to liquidate as an independent organization and integrate into the IDF or be destroyed, and Israeli troops surrounded the Irgun camp in the Katamon Quarter of Jerusalem. The Irgun accepted the ultimatum on September 22, 1948, and shortly afterward the remaining Irgun fighters in Jerusalem began enlisting in the IDF and turning over their arms. At Begin's orders, the Irgun in the diaspora formally disbanded on January 12, 1949, with the Irgun's former Paris headquarters becoming the European bureau of the Herut movement.

== Propaganda ==
In order to increase the popularity of the Irgun organization and ideology, Irgun employed propaganda. This propaganda was mainly aimed at the British, and included the idea of Eretz Israel. According to Irgun propaganda posters, the Jewish state was not only to encompass all of Mandatory Palestine, but also The Emirate of Transjordan.

When the Labour Party came into power in Britain in July 1945, Irgun published an announcement entitled, "We shall give the Labour Government a Chance to Keep Its Word." In this publication, Irgun stated, "Before it came to power, this Party undertook to return the Land of Israel to the people of Israel as a free state... Men and parties in opposition or in their struggle with their rivals, have, for twenty-five years, made us many promises and undertaken clear obligations; but, on coming to power, they have gone back on their words." Another publication, which followed a British counter-offensive against Jewish organizations in Palestine, Irgun released a document titled, "Mobilize the Nation!" Irgun used this publication to paint the British regime as hostile to the Jewish people, even comparing the British to the Nazis. In response to what was seen as British aggression, Irgun called for a Hebrew Provisional Government, and a Hebrew Liberation Army.

== Criticism ==
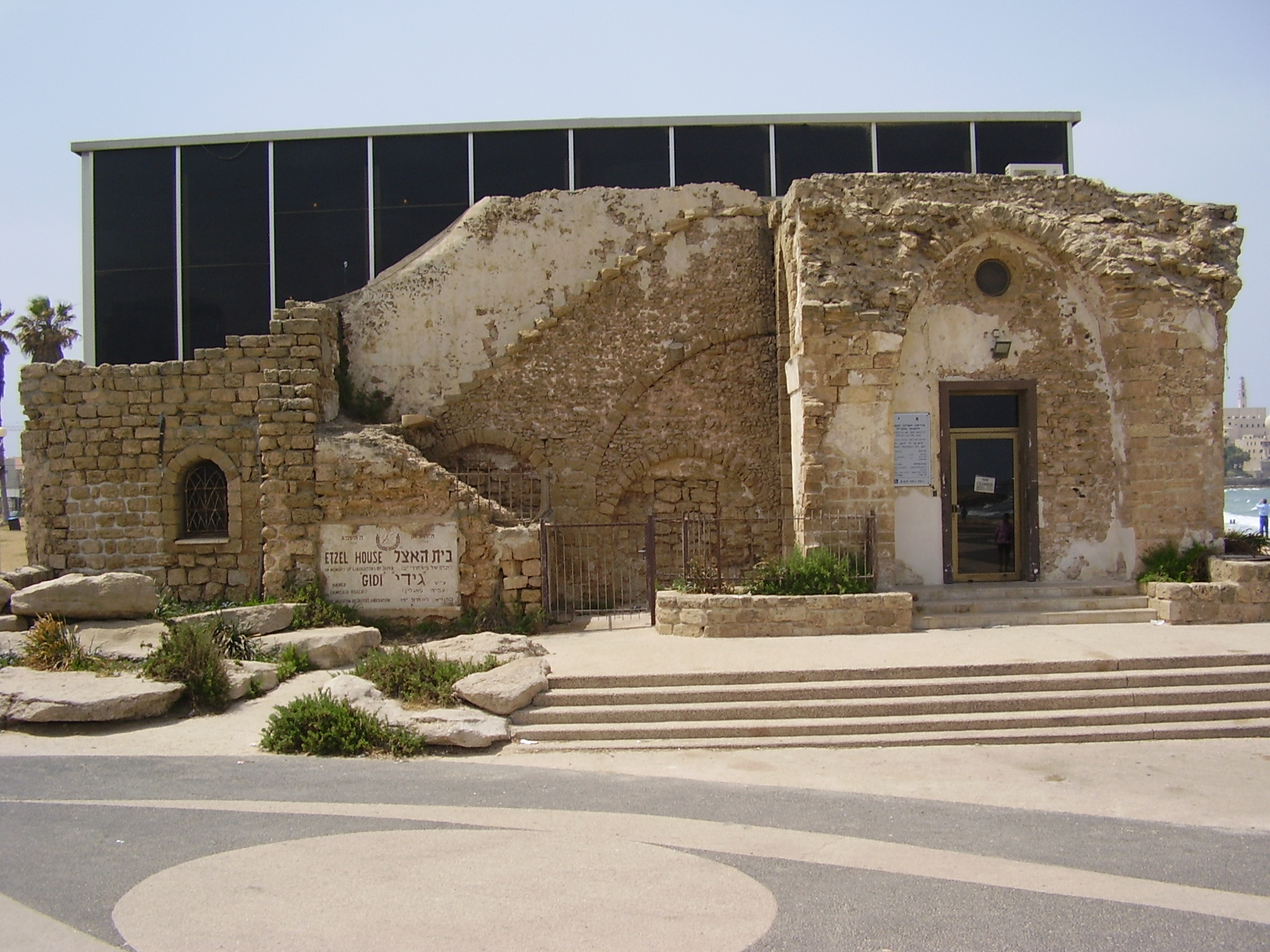
The Irgun museum in Tel Aviv

=== Description as a terrorist organization ===
References to the Irgun as a terrorist organization came from sources including the Anglo-American Committee of Inquiry, newspapers and a number of prominent world and Jewish figures. Leaders within the mainstream Jewish organizations, the Jewish Agency, Haganah and Histadrut, as well as the British authorities, routinely condemned Irgun operations as terrorism and branded it an illegal organization as a result of the group's attacks on civilian targets. However, privately at least the Haganah kept a dialogue with the dissident groups. Ironically, in early 1947, "the British army in Mandate Palestine banned the use of the term 'terrorist' to refer to the Irgun zvai Leumi ... because it implied that British forces had reason to be terrified."

Irgun attacks prompted a formal declaration from the World Zionist Congress in 1946, which strongly condemned "the shedding of innocent blood as a means of political warfare."

The Israeli government, in September 1948, acting in response to the assassination of Count Folke Bernadotte, outlawed the Irgun and Lehi groups, declaring them terrorist organizations under the Prevention of Terrorism Ordinance.

In 1948, The New York Times published a letter signed by a number of prominent Jewish figures including Hannah Arendt, Albert Einstein, Sidney Hook, and Rabbi Jessurun Cardozo, which described Irgun as "a terrorist, right-wing, chauvinist organization in Palestine". The letter went on to state that Irgun and the Stern gang "inaugurated a reign of terror in the Palestine Jewish community. Teachers were beaten up for speaking against them, adults were shot for not letting their children join them. By gangster methods, beatings, window-smashing, and widespread robberies, the terrorists intimidated the population and exacted a heavy tribute."

Soon after World War II, Winston Churchill said "we should never have stopped immigration before the war", but that the Irgun were "the vilest gangsters" and that he would "never forgive the Irgun terrorists."

In 2006, Simon McDonald, the British ambassador in Tel Aviv, and John Jenkins, the Consul-General in Jerusalem, wrote in response to a pro-Irgun commemoration of the King David Hotel bombing: "We do not think that it is right for an act of terrorism, which led to the loss of many lives, to be commemorated." They also called for the removal of plaques at the site which presented as a fact that the deaths were due to the British ignoring warning calls. The plaques, in their original version, read:

Warning phone calls had been made urging the hotel's occupants to leave immediately. For reasons known only to the British the hotel was not evacuated and after 25 minutes the bombs exploded, and to the Irgun's regret and dismay 91 persons were killed.

McDonald and Jenkins said that no such warning calls were made, adding that even if they had, "this does not absolve those who planted the bomb from responsibility for the deaths."

Bruce Hoffman states: "Unlike many terrorist groups today, the Irgun's strategy was not deliberately to target or wantonly harm civilians." Max Abrahms writes that the Irgun "pioneered the practice of issuing pre-attack warnings to spare civilians", which was later emulated by the African National Congress (ANC) and other groups and proved "effective but not foolproof". In addition, Begin ordered attacks to take place at night and even during Shabbat to reduce the likelihood of civilian casualties. U.S. military intelligence found that "the Irgun Zvai Leumi is waging a general war against the government and at all times took special care not to cause damage or injury to persons". Although the King David Hotel bombing is widely considered a prima facie case of Irgun terrorism, Abrahms comments: "But this hotel wasn't a normal hotel. It served as the headquarters for the British Armed Forces in Palestine. By all accounts, the intent wasn't to harm civilians."

=== Other ===
A January 1948 US military intelligence report alleged that the Irgun used intimidation, threats, and violence to control Displaced Persons (DP) camps in Germany, particularly by targeting members of the camp police force.

Alan Dershowitz wrote in his book The Case for Israel that unlike the Haganah, the policy of the Irgun had been to encourage the flight of local Arabs.

== See also ==
- Konrad Adenauer (Assassination attempt)
- Jewish religious terrorism
- List of Irgun attacks
- List of notable Irgun members
- Nationalist terrorism
- Zionist political violence
