= November 1937 =

Month of 1937

<<	November 1937					>>
Su	Mo	Tu	We	Th	Fr	Sa
	1	2	3	4	5	6
7	8	9	10	11	12	13
14	15	16	17	18	19	20
21	22	23	24	25	26	27
28	29	30

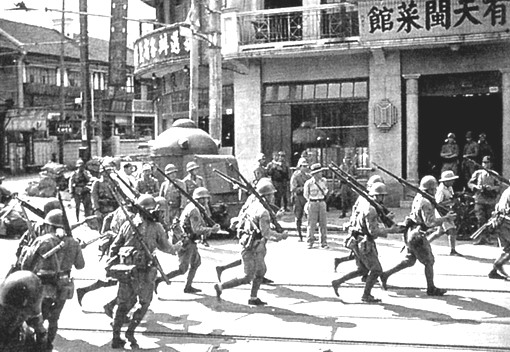
November 9, 1937: Imperial Japanese Army captures Shanghai.

The following events occurred in November 1937:

== November 1, 1937 (Monday) ==
- The University of Kerala was founded in British India as the University of Travancore, by the decree of Sir Chithira Thirunal Balarama Varma, the Maharaja of the Princely State of Travancore.
- The Defense of Sihang Warehouse, in the Zhabei district of Shanghai ended in Japanese victory and forced the retreat of the Chinese defenders. The Japanese invaders then crossed Suzhou Creek to go further into Shanghai.
- Celâl Bayar became the third Prime Minister of Turkey, succeeding İsmet İnönü, who had taken office in 1925.
- The American radio soap opera Hilltop House, starring Bess Johnson as the director of an orphanage began a five-year run on the CBS Radio Network and on the Mutual Broadcasting System.
- Anna Marie Hahn took the stand in her own defense during her sensational murder trial in Cincinnati, Ohio. Hahn denied ever poisoning anyone with arsenic.
- Born:
  - Bill Anderson, American country musician and television personality; in Columbia, South Carolina
  - William Melvin Kelley, African-American novelist known for A Different Drummer; in Staten Island, New York City (d.2017)
- Died:
  - Milan Gorkić, 33, Yugoslav communist leader and exiled General Secretary of the Communist Party of Yugoslavia, was executed nine days after being arrested as part of the Soviet Union's Great Purge.
  - Shio Batmanishvili, 52, Soviet Georgian Greek Catholic priest, was executed two months before his 10-year prison sentence was set to end.

== November 2, 1937 (Tuesday) ==
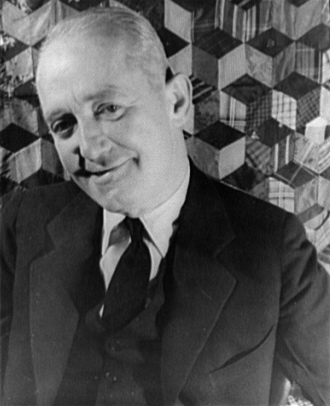
George M. Cohan

- The musical I'd Rather Be Right, with music by Richard Rodgers and lyrics by Lorenz Hart, opened on Broadway at the Alvin Theatre for the first of 290 Broadway performances. The musical was unprecedented because it was a political satire on the incumbent U.S. president and the rest of the federal government, with George M. Cohan singing the role of Franklin D. Roosevelt in forgettable Rodgers and Hart songs such as ""We're Going to Balance the Budget" and "Off the Record".*The Howie Morenz Memorial Game was played as a benefit to raise money for the family of the late Montreal Canadiens star Howie Morenz. The National Hockey League All-Stars defeated the "Montreal All-Stars" (drawn from both the Canadiens and Montreal Maroons) 6 to 5 in front of 8,683 fans at the Montreal Forum. Morenz, who had sustained multiple fractures of his left leg during a game on January 28, had died from a coronary embolism while convalescing in the hospital on March 8.
- Republican Fiorello H. La Guardia easily won re-election as Mayor of New York City, receiving more than 60 percent of the votes against challenger Jeremiah T. Mahoney.
- Born: Bharath Gopi, film actor, producer and director; in Chirayinkeezhu, British India (d. 2008)

== November 3, 1937 (Wednesday) ==
- The Nine Power Treaty Conference opened in Brussels to consider means of ending the war between Japan and China, with the nine World War One allies (Belgium, China, France, Italy, Japan, the Netherlands, Portugal, the UK, and the U.S.) participating. Japan's envoy said that it would formally declare war on China in order to speed a Chinese surrender, and soon withdrew from the talks.
- In Tokyo, Japan's Foreign Minister Kōki Hirota presented German ambassador Herbert von Dirksen with Japan's set of peace terms, to be sent by Dirksen to the German ambassador to China, Oskar Trautmann, to present to the Chinese government. Trautmann delivered the terms to Chinese Nationalist leader Chiang Kai-shek on November 5. Chiang made no reply to the peace offer, and neither the Nine Power Treaty Conference nor the League of Nations received a request for mediation of the terms of the offer.
- At Sandarmokh, the Soviet Union carried out the mass execution of 289 Ukrainians incarcerated at the Solovki prison camp on the orders of the senior executioner, Captain Mikhail Matveyev, who had set aside a day to shoot members of the "Executed Renaissance", the name for members of the Ukrainian intelligentsia. The dead including former Ukrainian People's Republic prime minister Volodymyr Chekhivskyi, film director Les Kurbas, diplomats Mykhailo Poloz and Mykhailo Lozynsky, and writers Mykola Kulish, Mykola Zerov, Hryhorii Epik, Mykhailo Yalovy, Antin Krushelnytskyi, Klym Polishchuk, and Myroslav Irchan.
- Ethiopia's Crown Prince, Asfaw Wossen Selassie petitioned the Coptic Church Council in Egypt for a divorce from his wife, Wolete Israel Seyoum, declaring that he could not live with the daughter of a man who surrendered to the Italian invaders.
- Police in the Free City of Danzig seized Jewish bank deposits.
- Born: Laxmikant Kudaikar, Indian film score composer (with his partner Pyarelai Sharma) for more than 750 movies; in Bombay, Bombay Presidency, British India (d.1998)
- Died: Solomon Lee Van Meter Jr., 49, American inventor who created the first successful backpack parachute, for which he received U.S. Patent No. 1,192,479 on July 25, 1916 after applying on March 27, 1911" died in a hospital after a short illness.

== November 4, 1937 (Thursday) ==
- The popular Soviet ice cream Plombir (Пломбир) was first produced as part of a Soviet Union adaptation of American food production, but with strict regulations for content for fat, sugar and added ingredients.
- Good News of 1938, an entertainment and interview program premiered on the NBC Radio Red Network, with adaptations of scenes from current MGM films with the actors reprising their roles and being interviewed afterward. The NBC series imitated CBS Radio's Lux Radio Theatre, which had originated on NBC in 1934 with adaptations of current Broadway plays. The first Good News program featured Allan Jones and Jeanette MacDonald voicing scenes from their latest movie, The Firefly, followed by interviews with 22 other prominent film personalities.
- The Clifford Odets play Golden Boy premiered on Broadway at the Belasco Theatre for the first of 250 performances. It would be revived in 1952 and 2012.
- Three men were executed by decapitation in Nazi Germany for high treason and espionage. Former Communist deputy Robert Stamm, Communist activist Adolf Rembte, and French spy Peter Sausen were all beheaded by guillotine at the Plötzensee prison in Charlottenburg.
- Born:
  - Loretta Swit (stage name for Loretta Jane Szwed), American TV actress best known for portraying Major Margaret Houlihan on M*A*S*H, for which she won two Emmy Awards (in 1980 and 1982); in Passaic, New Jersey (d. 2025)
  - Michael Wilson, Canadian Finance Minister from 1984 to 1991, and Minister of International Trade and of Industry, Science and Technology from 1991 to 1993; in Toronto (d. 2019)
- Died:
  - Emil Hassler, 73, Switzerland-born Paraguayan botanist and physician
  - Junius Henderson, 72, American natural history expert and first curator of the University of Colorado Museum of Natural History
  - Ghiță Moscu, 48, Romanian leftist activist, was killed in the Great Purge

== November 5, 1937 (Friday) ==
- At a secret meeting with his military advisors at the Chancellery in Berlin, German Chancellor Adolf Hitler disclosed his plan for the use of military force to annex the nations of Austria and Czechoslovakia to secure Lebensraum for Germany's people. According to the minutes of the meeting written five days later by Colonel Friedrich Hossbach, Hitler noted that "The aim of German policy was to make secure and to preserve the Volksmasse" (the German racial community) and that since the pure German race of 85 million people living in "the narrow limits of habitable space in Europe" was more "tightly packed" than in any other country, the Germans had an "implied right to a greater living space". In addition, since there was a decline in Deutschtum (German pride) in Austria and Czechoslovakia since the dissolution of Austria-Hungary after World War One, the future of Germany was "wholly conditional upon the solving of the need for space" by annexing the two nations into Nazi Germany.
- The Japanese Army defeated the Chinese in the Battle of Xinkou after more than three weeks of fighting for access to the Niangzi Pass through the Taihang Mountains and clearing the way for the Japanese occupation into Northern China. In 25 days of fighting between October 11 and the date of the capture of Taiyuan in the Shaanxi province, the Chinese had more than 55,000 casualties and the Japanese between 6,200 and 21,000.
- At Hangzhou Bay in China, 30,000 Japanese troops landed virtually unopposed.
- Germany and Poland signed a joint declaration on minorities, guaranteeing proper reciprocal treatment and protection of the Polish minority in Germany and the German minority in Poland.
- Pierre Dupong became the new prime minister of Luxembourg when premier Joseph Bech and his government resigned following the failure of a referendum to approve the Maulkuerfgesetz that would have allowed Luxembourg's government to ban any political parties deemed a danger to the nation's constitution. Finance Minister Dupong formed a new coalition government, with Bech remaining as the Foreign Minister.
- The Duke of Windsor cancelled a visit to the United States the day before he was to set sail. A statement through the Anglo-American Press Association cited "grave misconceptions" about the purpose of the trip, which was due to take place with Charles Bedaux.
- Born:
  - Chan Sek Keong, third Chief Justice of Singapore, from 2006 to 2012; in Ipoh, Federated Malay States
  - Harris Yulin, American character actor in film and television; in Los Angeles (d. 2025)
- Died:
  - Ivan Voronaev, 52, Soviet Russian Christian missionary who had introduced the first Pentecostal church to Russia, was executed at a labor camp after being arrested the year before.
  - Hadji Ali, 45+, Egyptian-born U.S. magician and vaudeville performer in the UK and the U.S., known for his acts of professional regurgitation
  - Jack McAuliffe, 71, Irish-born American boxer and the world lightweight boxing champion from 1886 to 1893, inductee to the International Boxing Hall of Fame, known for never having lost a bout.

== November 6, 1937 (Saturday) ==
- Fascist Italy joined the Anti-Comintern Pact, officially the "Agreement against the Communist International", that had previously been formed in 1936 by Nazi Germany and the Empire of Japan. While the Pact itself was largely symbolic, it raised the prospect of what one historian would call "the nightmare of an impending global alignment of the three expansionist powers". The symbolic alliance would be followed in 1939 by the "Pact of Steel" between Italy and Germany, and on September 27, 1940 by the Tripartite Pact, formally allying Germany, Japan and Italy as the "Axis powers" in World War II.
- The jury in the Anna Marie Hahn trial found her guilty of murder.
- Born: Yannis Tseklenis, Greek fashion designer; in Athens (d.2020)
- Died:
  - Johnston Forbes-Robertson, 84, English stage actor and theatre manager
  - Colin Campbell Cooper, 81, American impressionist painter of buildings, skylines and other structures

== November 7, 1937 (Sunday) ==
- The first direct elections in the Kingdom of Siam were held, with men and women allowed to vote for 91 of the 182 seats of the national parliament, the People's Assembly) (Sapha Phuthaen Rastodon), with no political party affiliations and candidates in each electoral district running as independents. The other 91 seats were for people appointed by King Ananda Mahidol.
- The political divisions of the Kingdom of Iran were reorganized by the Majlis parliament, with the 27 existing administrative subdivisions consolidated into six provinces. The arrangement lasted only two months and on January 9, 1938, the Majlis changed the organization to 10 provinces.
- In the Soviet Union, on the 20th anniversary of the October Revolution, 1,500,000 military personnel and civilians paraded in Moscow.

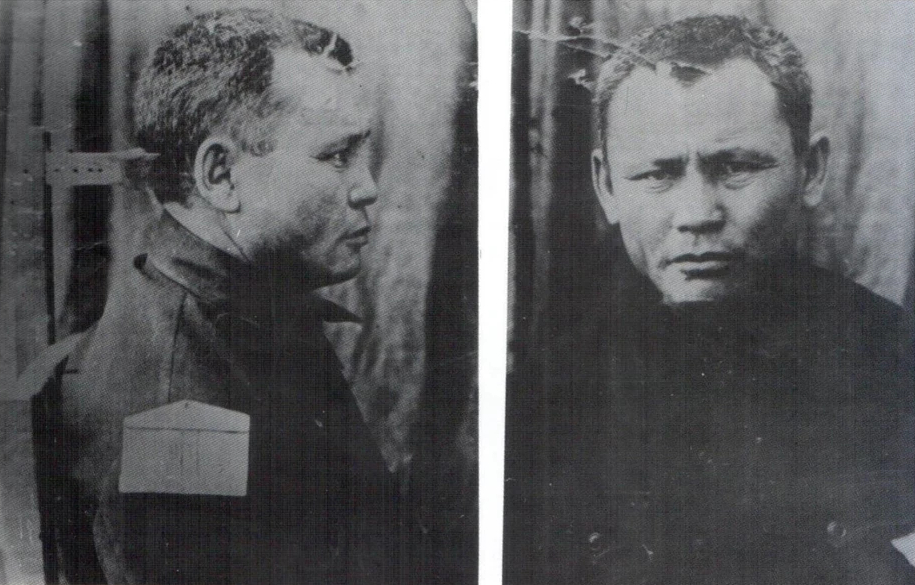
Secretary Ammosov's mug shot after his fatal faux pas.

- At the 20th anniversary rally held at Frunze, Maxim Ammosov, the First Secretary of the Kirghiz Communist Party and de facto leader of the Soviet Union's Kirghiz Soviet Socialist Republic made a slip of the tongue that would cost him his career and his life. In his address to the crowd, also broadcast on the radio, Secretary Ammosov meant to say "Down with fascism! Long live communism!", but shouted "Long live the victory of fascism throughout the world!". He then tried to correct the blunder by shouting "Under the brilliant leadership of the great Stalin, forward to the victory of communism throughout the world!" Ammosov was fired later in the day, then arrested on November 16. He would be executed on July 28, 1938.

== November 8, 1937 (Monday) ==
- The hoax of the "Dare Stones" began when Louis E. Hammond brought a 21 pounds (9.5 kg) stone, covered with inscriptions, to history professor Haywood J. Pearce at Emory University and asked for help in interpreting their meaning. Hammond claimed to have found the stone when he was visiting the east bank of the Chowan River in Chowan County, North Carolina in the U.S. and the writing suggested that it had been made by Virginia Dare, who was from the "Lost Colony" of 112 English colonists who had disappeared from North Carolina's Roanoke Island sometime between 1587 and 1590. Emory University announced the find on November 14.
- The Republic of China established the Order of National Glory, which remains the highest military award in Taiwan for the Republic of China Armed Forces.
- The All-China Journalists Association (ACJA) was established in the Republic of China by war correspondent Fan Changjiang as the "Chinese Young Journalist Association", initially as a trade union. Upon the founding of the People's Republic of China, the ACJA would become a means by the Communist government for registering all professional journalists, who are required to be ACJA members, and whose activities are overseen by the Propaganda Department of the Chinese Communist Party.
- The U.S. Supreme Court decided Bogardus v. Commissioner, a ruling that the distribution of money by decision of the board of directors, from a corporation to past and present employees of a former corporation, in recognition of past service, was a non-taxable gift
- Born: Paul Foot, Israeli journalist; in Haifa, Mandatory Palestine (d. 2004)
- Died: Francis de Croisset, 60, Belgian-born French playwright known for the plays La Dame de Malacca and Arsène Lupin and composer of librettos for operas, including Chérubin (1905) and Ciboulette (1923)

== November 9, 1937 (Tuesday) ==
- Japanese troops captured Shanghai after 88 days of fighting as the Chinese defenders retreated to protect Nanjing.
- Japanese forces won the Battle of Taiyuan in China, capturing Taiyuan City after more than two months of fighting. According to China's report of the battle, the Chinese Nationalist Army had 55,582 soldiers and officers killed in action, with 1,768 missing and more than 77,000 wounded, and the Japanese had between 10,000 and 27,000 killed and wounded.
- At the age of 8, Shrimant Raja Bhairavsinhrao Malojirao Ghorpade II became the last raja of the self-governing Mudhol princely state within British India, upon the death of his father, Malojirao IV Raje Ghorpade in the capital city, Mudhol (now part of the state of Karnataka).
- Born:
  - Major General Khaled Mosharraf, Bangladesh Army officer who led a coup d'état deposing President Khondaker Mostaq Ahmad on November 3, 1975, but was assassinated only four days after taking power; in Islampur, Bengal Presidency, British India (killed, 1975)
- Died:
  - Ramsay MacDonald (born James McDonald Ramsay), 71, the first Prime Minister of the United Kingdom from the Labour Party, who served in 1924, and again from 1929 to 1935
  - Dmitry Leshchenko, 61, Soviet Russian cinematographer and filmmaker, died at his home from an illness.

== November 10, 1937 (Wednesday) ==
- Captain Mikhail Matveyev, chief executioner of the Solovki prison camp, reported to the Soviet government that he had completed his task of executing almost all of the camp's prisoners over a 15-day period that had started on October 27. Matveyev documented that he had arranged for the shooting of 1,111 of the 1,116 inmates.

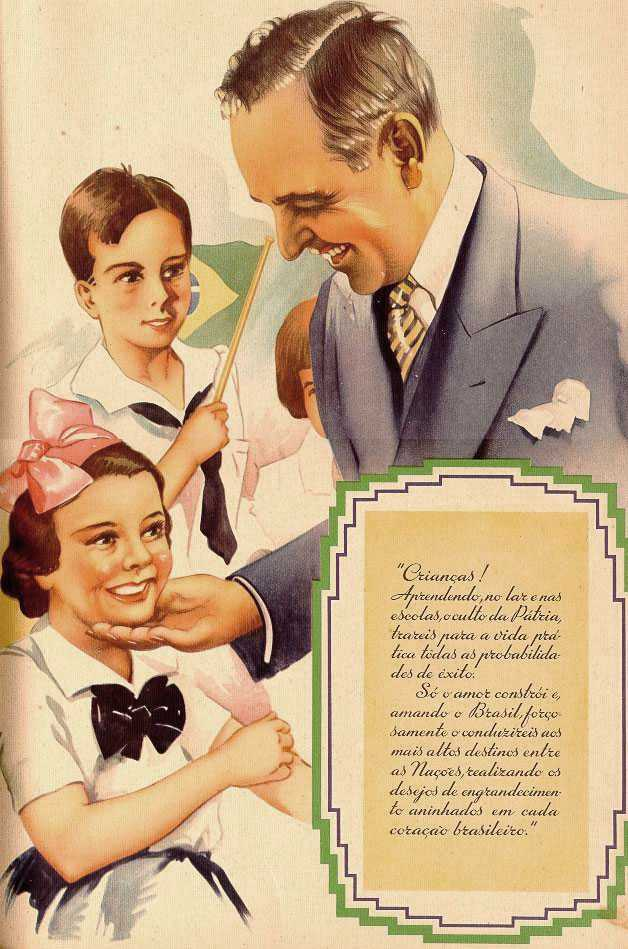
Estado Novo propaganda poster showing the benevolent President Vargas

- Brazilian President Getúlio Vargas, who had overthrown the government in 1930, declared the establishment of the Estado Novo and the promulgation of a new Constitution, giving himself dictatorial powers and a legal basis to cancel presidential elections scheduled for 1938, to arrest opponents, to censor the media and to give police increased power.
- Germany announced that all men born between 1893 and 1900 would be called up for medical inspection to assess their suitability to be drafted for military service.
- Born: Zdeněk Zikán, Czech footballer known for scoring four goals in three games for the Czechoslovak national team; in Prague, Czechoslovakia (d. 2013)
- Died: George Buckley, 71, New Zealand polar explorer and member of the British Antarctic Expedition of 1907 to 1909, for whom Buckley Island and Mount Buckley are named

== November 11, 1937 (Thursday) ==
- The British commissioner in Mandatory Palestine set up special military courts to try suspected terrorists. Anyone carrying unauthorized firearms, bombs or ammunition would be subject to the death penalty.

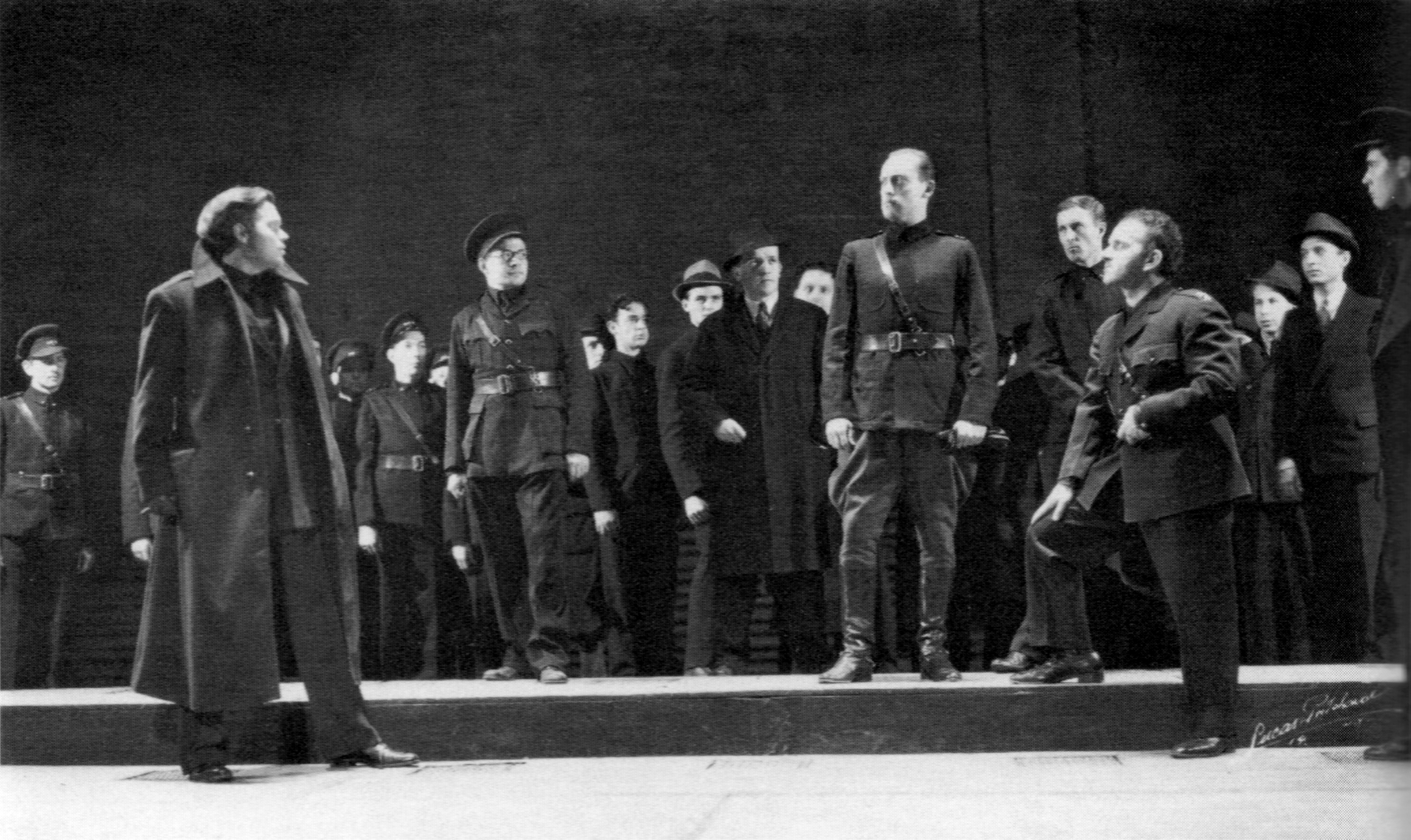
Joseph Holland (right) as Caesar, approached by Orson Welles as Brutus in the Mercury Theatre production

- The Mercury Theatre, operated by Orson Welles and John Houseman, made its debut with the play Caesar, adapted by Welles from William Shakespeare's play Julius Caesar, premiered on Broadway, with modern outfits for the players and a setting evocative of Fascist Italy. The production would run for 157 performances at the Mercury and then at the National Theatre, closing on May 28, 1938.
- In the Battle of Shanghai, the remaining Chinese defenders against the Japanese invasion, the 3,000 remaining police and soldiers from the 55th Division of the Chinese Army retreated to safety at the grounds of the French Concession. The Imperial Japanese Army began its advance towards Nanjing, approaching the city from different directions, and most of the Chinese Army retreated westward to set up the final defense of Nanjing.
- During Remembrance Day ceremonies at the Whitehall Cenotaph, an ex-serviceman who had escaped from a mental asylum interrupted the two minutes of silence by screaming "All this hypocrisy!" and something that sounded like "Preparing for war!" The police chased him down and silenced him, but the incident opened a dialogue in the British press about whether the annual tradition of the silence should continue.
- Born: Stephen Lewis, Canadian Ambassador to the United Nations from 1984 to 1988; in Ottawa (d. 2026)
- Died:
  - Miguel Paz Barahona, 74, President of Honduras from 1925 to 1929
  - Baron Uryū Sotokichi, 80, Japanese admiral of the Imperial Japanese Navy during the Russo-Japanese War
  - Ivan Boretz, 47, Ukrainian Soviet musician and director of the Horiv Bandura Ensemble, was executed in a Soviet prison after having been arrested on September 21 as part of the Great Purge.

== November 12, 1937 (Friday) ==
- The Empire of Japan issued a statement firmly refusing the offer by the nations of the Nine Power Treaty Conference to mediate the issues in the war by Japan against the Republic of China, and refused to take part at the conference in Brussels. Japan claimed that its invasion was a defensive war and China had been the aggressor.
- The memoir Out of Africa, by Karen Blixen, was published.
- German rocket scientist Wernher von Braun, who would be instrumental in developing Germany's V-1 and V-2 missiles for Nazi Germany during World War II, and in the U.S. space program after World War II, joined the Nazi Party at the age of 25 for career advancement and was issued membership number 5,738,692.
- The crime film The Last Gangster, starring Edward G. Robinson and James Stewart, was released in the United States.
- Born:
  - Tommy Koh (Koh Thong Bee), Singaporean diplomat who was Singapore's ambassador to the United Nations from 1968 to 1971; in Singapore, British Straits Settlements
  - Mills Lane, American professional boxer and boxing referee who became a Nevada state judge and later had his own syndicated television court show, Judge Mills Lane; in Savannah, Georgia (d.2022)
  - Irena Schusterová, First Lady of Slovakia from 1999 to 2004 as the wife of Slovak President Rudolf Schuster
  - Died:
  - Lieutenant Colonel George Buckley, 71, New Zealand explorer and military officer who accompanied Ernest Shackleton on the 1908 Antarctic Expedition.
  - Paul Fauchet, 56, French composer

== November 13, 1937 (Saturday) ==
- The NBC Symphony Orchestra performed its first concert with the premiere of its 90-minute radio show of the same name on both the Red Network and the Blue Network of the National Broadcasting Company, starting from New York at 10:00 Eastern Time. The 92-piece orchestra began with Bach's Passacaglia, followed by one of several symphonies by Mozart's titled Symphony in D While the orchestra and the show would regularly feature Arturo Toscanini as conductor, Pierre Monteaux of the San Francisco Symphony conducted the first concert.
- The Greek cargo ship SS Tzenny Chandris sank in a gale off of the Outer Banks of the U.S. state of North Carolina, killing eight of its 29 crew. The six survivors in a lifeboat were rescued by the oil tanker Swiftsure and 15 more were saved by the U.S. Coast Guard cutter USCGC Mendota after being spotted clinging to debris and fighting off sharks.
- The Treaty of Friendship, Commerce and Navigation between the United States and Siam was signed in Bangkok, more than 100 years after the U.S. made its first treaty with an Asian nation, the Kingdom of Siam (now Thailand), on March 20, 1833.
- Born:
  - Sujatha Paramanathan, Sri Lankan beauty pageant contestant and film, theater and TV actress; in Hulangamuwa Walawwa, Matale, British Ceylon
  - Vangelis Ploios, Greek stage, film and television actor; in Peristeri (d.2020)
  - Estelle Irizarry, American historian; in Paterson, New Jersey, winner of the 2010 Grand National Prize of the International Book Fair for her 2009 book The DNA of the Writings of Christopher Columbus in which she claimed that Columbus was a Catalan Spaniard who had been a convert to Christianity from Judaism; in Paterson, New Jersey (d.2017)
- Died:
  - Mrs. Leslie Carter (stage name for Caroline Dudley), 80, American stage and silent film actress
  - Ed Wutke, 35, American convicted murderer, died at the Alcatraz Federal Penitentiary after slicing his jugular vein with the blade from a pencil sharpener, marking the first time that an Alcatraz inmate had committed suicide.

== November 14, 1937 (Sunday) ==
- Ten civilians were killed and 13 injured in terrorist attacks on Palestinian Arabs in Jerusalem by the Revisionist Zionism terrorist group Irgun. The morning started with the random shooting of pedestrians in the Rehavia neighborhood, two of whom died, followed by an attack on a bus that killed three passengers and injured eight more. The attacks followed Arab violence against Jewish civilians in Jerusalem, and marked an end to the policy of Havlagah.
- U.S. President Franklin D. Roosevelt gave a fireside chat on the topic of the unemployment census.
- Born: Murray Oliver, Canadian ice hockey player and coach who played more than 1,000 NHL games between 1957 and 1975; in Hamilton, Ontario (d. 2014)
- Died:
- Soviet Georgian journalist Isidore Ramishvili, 78, was executed in prison in Tbilisi.
  - Sigrid Leijonhufvud, 75, Swedish historian and feminist

== November 15, 1937 (Monday) ==
- The Nepal Bank, the first commercial bank in the Kingdom of Nepal, was opened by King Tribhuvan Bir Bikram
- The Nine Power Treaty Conference adopted a declaration condemning Japan, declaring that the conflict was "of concern to all countries parties to the Nine-Power Treaty and the Kellogg-Briand Pact." Only Italy voted against the motion.
- "Sadie Hawkins Day", a fad in North America during the middle one-third of the 20th century, as a time when females would ask males for a date or a dance was introduced by Al Capp in the popular comic strip Li'l Abner.
- A statue of Sun Yat-sen was unveiled in San Francisco, California at St. Mary's Square.
- Born: Little Willie John (stage name for William Edward John), American rhythm and blues singer singer and inductee to the Rock and Roll Hall of Fame; in Cullendale, Arkansas (died of a heart attack in prison, 1968)
- Died:
  - Gleb Bokii, 58, Soviet secret police chief who was the director of GUGB, the Main Directorate of State Security of the NKVD, and of its predecessor offices in the OGPU, GPU and Cheka from 1921 to 1937, was executed hours after being tried, convicted and sentenced to death by the Military Collegium of the Supreme Court of the Soviet Union on charges of conspiratorial activity.
  - Seyid Riza, 74, Turkish Kurdish rebel who led the Dersim rebellion against the government from March until his arrest on September 12, was hanged at Elazığ, followed by six fellow insurrectionists.

== November 16, 1937 (Tuesday) ==
- All 11 people on a SABENA airliner were killed when the Junkers Ju 52 crashed in Belgium while en route from Frankfurt to Brussels with a final scheduled destination of London. Because of heavy fog, the plane was diverted to a landing at Ostend, and, in poor weather struck a 160 feet (49 m) high smokestack with its right wing while at an altitude of 130 feet (40 m). The dead included the former Duke and Duchess of Hesse, and aircraft designer Arthur Martens.
- The British government announced the appointment of Robert Hodgson, its agent to the consulate in Burgos. Although this fell short of diplomatic recognition, it was a form of de facto recognition that was an achievement for the government of Francisco Franco.
- The first patent for an air conditioner in a motor vehicle was granted to inventor Ralph Peo of Houde Engineering Company. U.S. Patent No. 2,099,227 was granted to Peo of "Air Cooling Unit for Automobiles" two years after he applied for it on October 7, 1935, and was initially intended as a product to be installed in existing cars.
- Died:
  - Princess Cecilie of Greece and Denmark, 26, and her husband, Georg Donatus, Hereditary Grand Duke of Hesse, 31, were both killed along with their sons Ludwig, 6 and Alexander, 4, and Georg's mother Princess Eleonore of Solms-Hohensolms-Lich, 66, in the German airliner crash in Belgium.
  - Khas-Ochiryn Luvsandorj, 27, Mongolian Communist politician who served as the Chairman of the Mongolian People's Party and de facto leader of the Mongolian People's Republic from 1934 to 1936, was executed by the Internal Security Directorate of Mongolia after being charged with counterrevolution during the purge of opponents of Khorloogiin Choibalsan.
  - Gustav Shpet, 58, Russian psychologist, historian and interpreter fluent in 17 languages, was executed three weeks after being arrested and charged with belonging to a monarchist organization.

== November 17, 1937 (Wednesday) ==
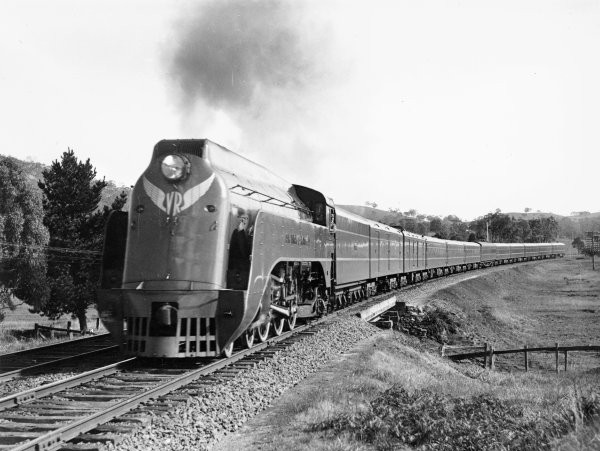
The Spirit of Progress

- The fastest train in Australia, Victorian Railways' Spirit of Progress, inaugurated service, departing from Melbourne down toward Geelong with 300 passengers, and reaching an unprecedented speed of 74 miles per hour (119 km/h) in a headwind, and raced against an Airco DH.4 airplane to prove its speed. On its return, the Spirit reached 79.5 miles per hour (127.9 km/h) between Werribee and Laverton.
- The Argentine film musical Melodías porteñas (Buenos Aires Melodies), directed by Luis Moglia Barth, premiered.
- British cabinet minister Lord Halifax arrived in Germany for talks with Nazi officials.
- Louis, Prince of Hesse and by Rhine married Margaret-Campbell Geddes, daughter of Auckland Geddes, in London. The bride wore black because of the previous day's plane crash deaths of the Duke and Duchess of Hesse and other relatives.
- Born:
  - Laila Ohlgren, Swedish telecommunications engineer and co-developer (with Östen Mäkitalo) of mobile telephony; as Ragnhild Laila Lillemor Andersson; in Stockholm (d.2014)
  - Peter Cook, English actor, comedian and screenwriter; in Torquay, Devonshire (d. 1995)
  - Olena Antoniv, Polish-born Ukrainian Soviet dissident; in Bóbrka, Poland (now Bibrka in Ukraine) (d.1986 in a pedestrian accident)
- Died: Jack Worrall, 76, Australian rules footballer and cricketer known for coaching 279 football games from 1902 and 1920 for the Carlton Blues and then for the Essendon Bombers in the Victorian Football League, and playing for the England national cricket team from 1885 to 1899

== November 18, 1937 (Thursday) ==
- French authorities uncovered a plot by the paramilitary group La Cagoule to overthrow the government and restore the monarchy.
- The Italian cargo ship Boccaccio sank after anti-fascist saboteurs, hired by German Communist Ernst Wollweber, detonated a bomb as the ship was carrying weapons and ammunition to supply the Fascist Spanish Nationalists, led by Francisco Franco. One of the 32 crew was killed by the blast, and the other 31 were rescued by the Netherlands freighter Tajandoen.
- Born: Larry Buendorf, U.S. Secret Service agent known for foiling a 1975 attempt by former Manson Family member Lynette "Squeaky" Fromme to assassinate U.S. President Gerald Ford; in Wells, Minnesota (d.2025)

== November 19, 1937 (Friday) ==
- George Eyston broke the land speed record set by Malcolm Campbell in 1935, and became the first person to travel at a speed of more than 500 kilometers per hour, achieving the mark of 311.42 miles per hour (501.18 km/h) at the Bonneville Salt Flats in the U.S. state of Utah.
- Chinese forces abandoned the Wufu Line, their second-to-last line of defense after the fall of Suzhou to the Japanese Army, and fell back to the Xichen Line, the last fortified position in defending Nanjing.
- The musical comedy film A Damsel in Distress starring Fred Astaire, George Burns and Gracie Allen was released.
- Born: Penelope Leach, British child psychologist and author of the 1977 bestseller Your Baby and Child: From Birth to Age Five; in Hampstead, London.
- Died: Rabbi Aryeh Leib Shifman, 46, Soviet Russian Jewish rabbi, was executed at the NKVD prison in Smolensk after refusing to become a secret informant for the Soviet secret police agency.

== November 20, 1937 (Saturday) ==
- The Chinese government moved its capital from Nanking to Chungking in advance of the Japanese invasion.
- On the same day, the Japanese captured Suzhou.
- Born:
  - Ruth Laredo, American classical pianist; in Detroit (d. 2005)
  - Aza Likhitchenko, Russian anchor and hostess of the news program Vremya for Soviet Central Television; in Moscow (d.2024)
  - Pamela Turnure, U.S. journalist and the first Press Secretary for a First Lady of the United States, known for speaking for Jackie Kennedy during Mrs. Kennedy's tenure from 1961 to 1963; in New York City (d.2023)
- Died: Ivan Petrovykh, 64, Russian Orthodox Metropolitan of Leningrad and Christian martyr, was executed along with Metropolitan Kirill Smirnov of Kazan, 74 and Bishop Evgeny Kobranov were all executed near Shymkent

== November 21, 1937 (Sunday) ==
- Lord Halifax, Lord President of the Privy Council for British Prime Minister Neville Chamberlain ended his visit to Nazi Germany. He returned to London believing that Hitler could be bargained with, and this development marked the beginning of Chamberlain's appeasement policy toward Germany.
- Dmitri Shostakovich's Symphony No. 5 was performed for the first time, with Yevgeny Mravinsky conducting the Leningrad Philharmonic Orchestra
- The American Negro Ballet Company made its debut performance, premiering at the Lafayette Theatre.
- Born:
  - Marlo Thomas (stage name for Margaret Julia Thomas), American television actress known for That Girl and social activist for cancer research, winner of three Primetime Emmy Awards, a Grammy Award, and the Presidential Medal of Freedom; in Detroit
  - Ingrid Pitt (stage name for Ingoushka Petrov), Polish-born British film and television actress and Holocaust survivor; in Warsaw (d. 2010)
  - Motinggo Busye (pen name for Bustami Djalid), Indonesian novelist; in Bandar Lampung, Sumatra, Dutch East Indies (d.1999)
  - Marva Scott, African-American female professional wrestler from 1954 to 1979, inductee to the Women’s Wrestling Hall of Fame; in Decatur, Georgia (d.2003)
  - Mabel "Tina" Howe, American playwright known for Pride's Crossing; in New York City (d.2023)
- Died: Howard E. Coffin, 64, American automobile engineer, former Chairman of the U.S. Aircraft Production Board during World War One, and one of the eight co-founders of the Hudson Motor Car Company, was found dead from an accidental discharge of his hunting rifle.

== November 22, 1937 (Monday) ==
- A group of foreign nationals in China organized the Nanking Safety Zone, a demilitarized zone in the areas of the embassies, consulates and legations in the Chinese city of Nanjing, in order to protect refugees from the impending Japanese invasion. The Safety Zone was only partially successful, and its safety was disregarded by the Japanese invaders on December 14, 1937.
- The Muslim Society of Great Britain held its first public meeting to protest the Peel Commission's recommendation to partition Palestine. Sir Ernest Nathaniel Bennett chaired the meeting.
- Born:
  - Nobuyuki Idei, Japanese business executive who served at various times as company president, CEO and chairman of the board and CEO of Sony Corporation from to 1998 to 2005 (d.2022)
  - James Leprino, American businessman and billionaire dubbed "the Willie Wonka of Cheese" by The New York Times who founded Leprino Foods, the world's largest manufacturer of mozzarella cheese; in Denver, Colorado (d.2025)
  - Pierre Léna, French astrophysicist known for chartering, in 1973, a Concorde flight to make the longest observation of a total solar eclipse; in Paris
- Died:
  - Armenian Army General Movses Silikyan, 75, hero of the 1918 Battle of Sardarabad, was executed in the Soviet Union after being convicted of being a member of a "counterrevolutionary officers' organization".
  - Philip de László (born Fülöp Laub), 68, Hungarian painter

== November 23, 1937 (Tuesday) ==
- Paul van Zeeland resigned as Prime Minister of Belgium after more than two and one-half years after a government investigation discovered that he had failed to disclose that he had received 333,000 Belgian francs from the National Bank of Belgium to suppress labor unrest. King Leopold III asked former minister of justice Paul-Émile Janson to become the new prime minister.
- The play Of Mice and Men, based on the John Steinbeck novel of the same name, premiered at the Music Box Theatre on Broadway for the first of 207 performances. Predating the Tony Awards, the play received the award for Best American Play of the 1937–1938 season from the New York Drama Critics' Circle.
- Died:
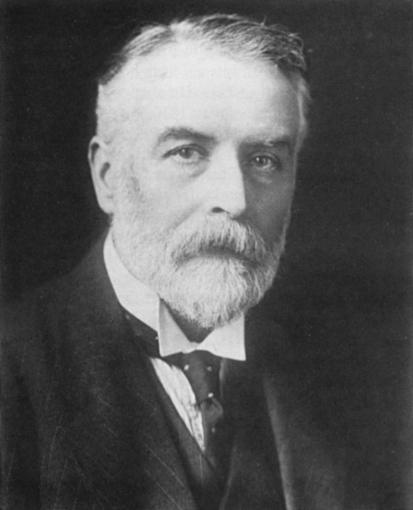
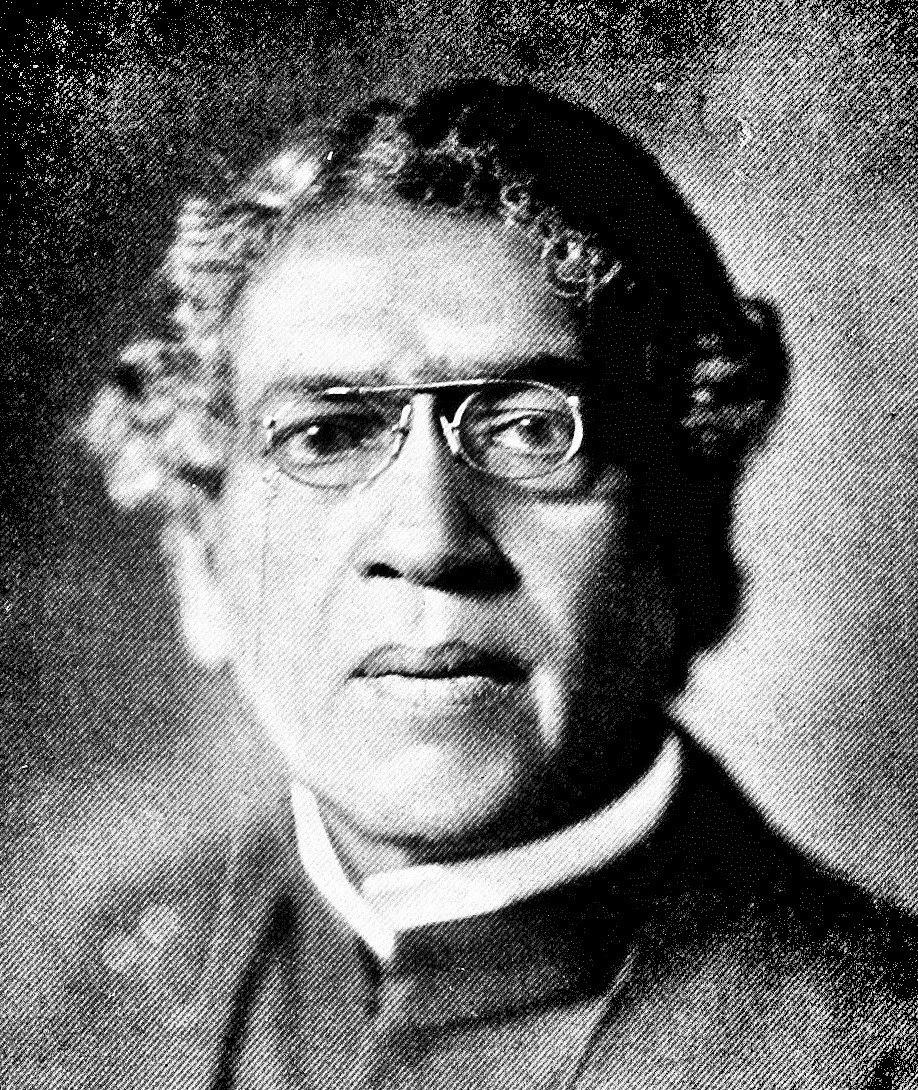
Scientists G. A. Boulenger and J. C. Bose
  - George Albert Boulenger, 79, Belgian-born British zoologist known for first identifying 2,524 separate animal species (1,096 fish, 556 amphibians and 872 reptiles) and naming them, including the Concave-crowned horned toad (Boulenophrys parva); the water snake Boulenger's keelback (Fowlea asperrima), and the lizard Boulenger's least gecko (Sphaerodactylus scapularis). The genus names of three genera of fish (Boulengerella, Boulengerochromis and Boulengeromyrus ) are named in his honor as well.
  - Jagadish Chandra Bose, 78, Bengali scientist and inventor, founder and director of the Bose Institute in India, the first interdisciplinary research center in Asia.
  - Tell Taylor, 61, American songwriter and playwright best known for the 1910 hit song "Down by the Old Mill Stream
  - Horace M. Towner, 82, American politician who served as U.S. Representative for Iowa from 1911 to 1923, and territorial Governor of Puerto Rico from 1923 to 1929, died 10 days after being seriously injured in a fall at his home.

== November 24, 1937 (Wednesday) ==
- The Nine Power Treaty Conference ended with little accomplished.
- Swedish composer Lars-Erik Larsson's Symphony No. 2 was given its first performance, premiering at a concert of the Royal Stockholm Philharmonic Orchestra.
- British Prime Minister Neville Chamberlain responded to a question in the House of Commons about Lord Halifax's recent trip to Germany by explaining that the visit was "entirely private and unofficial" and so he would not "make any further statement in regard to them at this stage." Chamberlain called speculation in the British press about the nature of the discussions "not only irresponsible but highly inaccurate."
- In Canada, the first Governor General's Awards were presented by Lord Tweedsmuir.
- Died: Nikolay Oleynikov, 39, Russian playwright; Nikolai Nevsky, 45, Russian linguist; Ivan Kuchuhura-Kucherenko, 59, Ukrainian musician; and Victor Sokovnin, 51, Russian opera singer, were all executed in prison in Leningrad as part of the purge of Soviet intelligentsia.

== November 25, 1937 (Thursday) ==
- French authorities arrested Eugène Deloncle, leader of the Fascist organization La Cagoule, and retired General Édouard Duseigneur and charged them with plotting to overthrow the government of Prime Minister Camille Chautemps.
- Born:
  - Chuck Peddle, American computer engineer who led the designing team for the inexpensive MOS 6502 8-bit microprocessor in 1975, lowering the cost of computer electronics; in Bangor, Maine (d.2019)
  - Frances Cherry, New Zealand novelist and author of young adult and children's fiction; in Wellington (d.2022)
- Died:
  - Lilian Baylis, 63, English theatrical producer and manager known for her operation of the English National Opera and The Royal Ballet'
  - Father Aleksandr Glagolev, 65, Ukrainian Russian Orthodox priest, died in Lukyanivska Prison during torture while awaiting execution.
- Died: Five prominent Soviet Russian citizens were executed in prison as part of the Great Purge:
  - Alexander Krasnoshchyokov, 57, Soviet politician and the first Chairman of the Communist Far Eastern Republic from 1920 to 1921
  - Isaak Illich Rubin, 51, Soviet Russian theorist on Marxian economics, known for 1923's Essays on Marx's Theory of Value;
  - Leonid Kurchevsky, 48, Russian weapons designer;
  - Bernhard Petri, 53, Russian archaeologist
  - Alexander Abramov-Mirov, 42, former Soviet intelligence agent and Comintern communications officer

== November 26, 1937 (Friday) ==
- The Battle of Shanghai came to an end after more than three months as China's National Revolutionary Army retreated and abandoned its "Xincheng Line", its expensive line of defense posts that served as the last line of defense between Shanghai and Nanjing, and the Imperial Japanese Army and Navy completed their takeover of the Chinese port. An estimate made in 2017 concluded 80 years after the battle that 18,800 Japanese troops were killed and more than 35,000 wounded, while the Chinese Ministry of Military Affairs estimated 300,000 Chinese troops were killed or wounded.
- Hjalmar Schacht resigned as Reich Minister of Economics and was replaced by Hermann Göring. Schacht remained in the Cabinet as minister without portfolio.
- Robert Schumann's only Violin Concerto, written in 1853, was performed for the first time, more than 80 years after it had been written, in a concert of the Berlin Philharmonic Orchestra.
- A supernova in the galaxy NGC 1482 was observed from Earth the first time, more than 87 million years after it happened, with the event seen by Swiss astronomer Fritz Zwicky.
- Born:
  - Boris Yegorov, Soviet Russian physician and cosmonaut who became the first medical doctor in space during the Voskhod 1 mission in 1964; in Moscow, USSR (d. 1994)
  - Jim Sundquist, American rockabilly guitarist, in Niagara, Wisconsin (d.2013) and Phil Humphrey, American rhythm guitarist, in Milwaukee (d.2016), who formed the duo The Fendermen and were known for the 1960 hit "Mule Skinner Blues".
- Died:
  - Peljidiin Genden, 42, Mongolian Communist who served as the first President of Mongolia (as Chairman of the Presidium) from 1924 to 1927, and Prime Minister of the Mongolian People's Republic from 1932 to 1936, was executed in Moscow on charges of conspiracy against the revolution and spying for Japan.
  - Alexander Krasnoshchyokov (Avraam Krasnoshchyok), 57, Ukrainian Soviet politician who served as the first head of state of the short-lived Far Eastern Republic from 1920 to 1922, was executed the day after being convicted of espionage.
  - Yakov Ganetsky (Jakub Fürstenberg), 58, Polish-born Soviet financier, banker and diplomat, was executed hours after being convicted of espionage.
  - Alexander Abramov-Mirov, 42, Soviet intelligence agent and communications officer was executed by gunshot the day after the Military Collegium of the Supreme Court of the Soviet Union convicted him on charges of leading a "Trotskyist terror organization" and spying for Germany.
  - Heinz Neumann, 35, German Communist Party politician and journalist, was executed the day after being sentenced to death by the Military Collegium.
  - Major General Silvestras Žukauskas, 76, Lithuanian military officer who served as a divisional commander for the Imperial Russian Army in World War One, and as Chief Commander of the Lithuanian Army from 1923 to 1928, died of natural causes.
  - Dexter Fellows, 63, American circus promoter and press agent for the Ringling Bros. and Barnum & Bailey Circus
  - Herbert Bunning, 74, British opera and classical music composer
  - Alejandro Vega Matus, 62, Nicaraguan pop music composer
- Other prominent Soviet persons executed as part of the Great Purge were Ivan Bespalov, literary critic, 37; General Leonid Veyner, 40; and Stepan Dybets, 50, Ukrainian anarchist communist.

== November 27, 1937 (Saturday) ==
- At a speech following the laying of the cornerstone for the first building on the planned Berlin University, German Chancellor Adolf Hitler announced his plans for a major construction project to turn the capital, Berlin, into "Welthauptstadt Germania" ("World Capital Germania"). Hitler told the crowd, "It is my unalterable purpose and determination to ornament Berlin with those streets, structures and public squares which will make it through all the ages the worthy capital of the German Reich. The size of these projects and undertakings shall not be measured by the needs of 1937 or 1940. They will be planned with the knowledge that it is our duty to prepare a city that will stand a thousand years, worthy of the immeasurable future of a nation with a thousand years' history." to follow architectural plans overseen by Albert Speer. Demolition of existing buildings began in 1938 and one part of the new city, a boulevard called the East-West Axis (Ost-West-Achse, now the Straße des 17. Juni), was partially completed, but construction would be halted with the outbreak of World War Two in 1939.
- With the oversight of the Fascist Governor-General of Italian East Africa, Marshal Rodolfo Graziani, clergymen of the Ethiopian Orthodox Tewahedo Church elected Abuna Abraham as their new Archbishop, and to depose the existing church leader, Abuna Qerellos IV.
- The 13-team National Basketball League (NBL), the second professional basketball association to have franchises across a large part of the United States, played its first game, with the Akron Firestone Non-Skids hosting the Indianapolis Kautskys (of Kautsky Athletic Club) at Akron, Ohio near Cleveland. The Non-Skids won, 53 to 20, after leading 24 to 8 at halftime. The NBL and the Basketball Association of America (BAA) (which would be founded in 1946) would merge on August 3, 1949 to form the National Basketball Association (NBA), which included five teams (now the Detroit Pistons, Sacramento Kings, Philadelphia 76ers, Atlanta Hawks, and Los Angeles Lakers) that had originated in the NBL.
- The musical revue Pins and Needles, with music and lyrics by Harold Rome and a cast drawn from members of the International Ladies Garment Workers' Union (ILGWU), premiered at the Labor Stage Theatre on Broadway for the first of 1,108 performances.
- A record crowd of 120,000 spectators turned out for a high school football game, the Chicago Prep Bowl, at Chicago's Soldier Field (which had a 76,000 seats). Chicago's public school champion, the Tigers of Austin High School defeated the city's parochial school titleholder, the Lions of Leo Catholic High School, 28 to 0.
- German-born American serial killer Anna Marie Hahn was sentenced to death after being found guilty of the murder of five elderly men by poisoning between 1933 and August 1, 1937. Mrs. Hahn would be executed in the electric chair at the Ohio State Penitentiary on December 7, 1938.
- Died:
  - Vsevolod Balitsky, 45, Ukrainian Internal Affairs Minister and former Commissar of State Security of the NKVD secret police, known for ordering the arrest and execution of hundreds of people during his administration, was executed at the NKVD prison in Moscow along with Filipp Medved, 47, Belarusian Soviet secret police official for the NKVD Leningrad office, the OGPU in the Byelorussian SSR, and the Cheka in Petrograd.
  - Farhan al-Sa'di, 75, Palestinian Arab rebel commander who started the Arab revolt in British Palestine in 1936, was hanged at Acre Prison.
  - Felix Hamrin, 62, Prime Minister of Sweden for seven weeks in August and September 1932
  - Ruben Rubenov, 43, Soviet Armenian Communist who served as the de facto leader of the Armenian SSR as First Secretary of the Azerbaijan Communist Party, was executed at the Butovo firing range.
  - Vasyl Lypkivsky, 73, founder of the Ukrainian Autocephalous Orthodox Church and the first "Metropolitan of Kyiv and All Ukraine", was executed at a prison in Kiev in the Ukrainian SSR after his arrest during the Great Purge.
- Other people executed on the same day in the Great Purge were Eero Haapalainen, 57, Finnish Communist politician; Nikolay Kubyak, 56, Soviet Russian member of the Communist Party Central Committee; Isidor Lyubimov, 55, former People's Commissar of Light Industry; and Ivan Mikhailovich Moskvin, 47, Soviet Russian Communist economic official.

== November 28, 1937 (Sunday) ==
- Generalissimo Francisco Franco announced a total naval blockade of the remaining ports under Republican control and warned that any ship attempting to enter the ports would be attacked. Franco gave an ultimatum of December 12 for the remaining members of the Republican government to surrender, or to face a massive new offensive.
- An assassination attempt against Egypt's Prime Minister Mostafa el-Nahas, failed as Nahas's bodyguards stopped Ezz al-Din Tewfiq, a member of the fascist Green Shirts.
- A referendum on whether to ban freemasonry was held in Switzerland, and was overwhelmingly rejected by a two-thirds of the participating voters, with 68.68% of voters against, and a majority of rejections in all but one of the nation's 22 cantons rejected a proposed ban on the practice.
- Born:
  - Wilbur Ross, American businessman who served as founder and CEO (from 2000 to 2017) of WL Ross & Co who became known as "The King of Bankruptcy" for acquiring and restructuring of bankrupt companies, and later became the U.S. Secretary of Commerce at age 79; in Weehawken, New Jersey
  - Anastas Kondo, Albanian novelist and screenwriter; in Kuçovë (d.2006)
  - Dan Stannard, British India-born intelligence agency official for Rhodesia and for Zimbabwe; in Peshawar, North-West Frontier Province (now in Pakistan) (d.2023)
- Died: Myroslava Sopilka, 40, Soviet Ukrainian poet and novelist who had been arrested along with her husband on charges of espionage for Poland, was executed by gunshot at the NKVD prison in Kyiv.

== November 29, 1937 (Monday) ==
- Following the lobbying of Indian independence advocate H. K. Konar and a 36-day hunger strike of incarcerated political prisoners, the government of British India began the repatriation of 385 inmates who had been held at the Cellular Jail at Port Blair on the South Andaman Island, hundreds of miles from the Indian mainland.
- The unbeaten University of Pittsburgh Panthers won the 1937 college football season championship, determined at the time by the results of an Associated Press poll of 33 sportswriters. Pitt, which had finished the season at 9–0–1, received 327 points out of a possible 330 under the weighted scoring system, while the 9-0-1 California Golden Bears had 277, the 9-0-1 Fordham Rams (who had tied Pitt 0 to 0 on October 16) 253 and the 9-0-0 Alabama Crimson Tide 246.
- The possibility of a football game, between the #1 and #2 teams in the U.S., ended on the same day when the 31 University of Pittsburgh players voted to decline a bid to play in the 1938 Rose Bowl, where their opponent would have been the second-ranked University of California. Player demands included cash for each player to use during the trip to California, leaving no player behind, and a two-week vacation. One report noted that the vote was 16 against the trip and 15 in favor.
- Italy formally recognized Manchukuo, the Japanese puppet state created in Manchuria in China.
- Born: Marco Zappia, Emmy Award winning American television editor; in Los Angeles (d.2013)

== November 30, 1937 (Tuesday) ==
- The Soviet Union's security police, the NKVD began the "Latvian Operation" (Latyshskaya operatsiya), its latest ethnic cleansing of a minority group within Soviet borders. NKVD Director Nikolai Yezhov had signed Order No. 49990 ("On carrying out an operation of repressing Latvians" on November 23. According to NKVD reports, out of an estimated 150,000 ethnic Latvians remaining in the USSR after the departure of most to an independent Republic of Latvia, 22,369 were arrested during the 12 months of the Latvian Operation, which ended on November 26, 1938, and 16,573 of those arrested were executed.
- At the age of 81, Russian Orthodox Bishop Seraphim Chichagov was arrested by Soviet authorities on charges of "spreading monarchist propaganda." He was executed 11 days later, on December 11, 1937.
- Clint Frank of Yale University was awarded college football's Heisman Trophy.
- The Soda Springs Geyser, a tourist attraction at the city of Soda Springs in the U.S. state of Idaho, was created accidentally during a well-drilling operation that tapped an underground hot spring and released a geyser 100 feet (30 m) high. The attraction was capped and is released by a timer once per hour.
- American film actors Jackie Coogan and Betty Grable were united in marriage, the first for each, in a ceremony at St. Brendan's Catholic Church in Los Angeles. Although they would appear together in one film (College Swing in 1938), the two divorced after less than two years.
- Born:
  - Ridley Scott, English film director and producer known for Alien (1979), Blade Runner (1982), Thelma & Louise (1991), Gladiator (2000) and other popular films; in South Shields, County Durham
  - Luther Ingram, American R&B and soul singer known for "(If Loving You Is Wrong) I Don't Want to Be Right"; in Jackson, Tennessee (d.2007)
  - Frank Ifield, British-born Australian country music singer and yodeler, known for "I Remember You"; in Coundon, Coventry, Warwickshire (d.2024)
  - Tom Simpson, English professional cyclist known for collapsing and dying from heart failure while competing in the 1967 Tour de France; in Haswell, County Durham (d.1967)
  - Burton Tansky, American department store executive who served as president and CEO of The Neiman Marcus Group from 2001 to 2010; in Pittsburgh(d.2025)
- Died:
  - Thubten Choekyi Nyima, 54, the ninth Panchen Lama of Tibet
  - Fred Lake, 54, Canadian ice hockey player and one of the first professionals in the sport, committed suicide.
