= Koonya =

Koonya may refer to:

- Koonya (1887), a wood carvel screw steamer built in 1887
- Koonya, Tasmania, a populated place on the Tasman Peninsula, Tasmania, Australia
- Koonya Garlic Festival, annual event in Koonya, Tasmania
