= George Buckley (explorer) =

New Zealand farmer, soldier and adventurer (1866–1937)

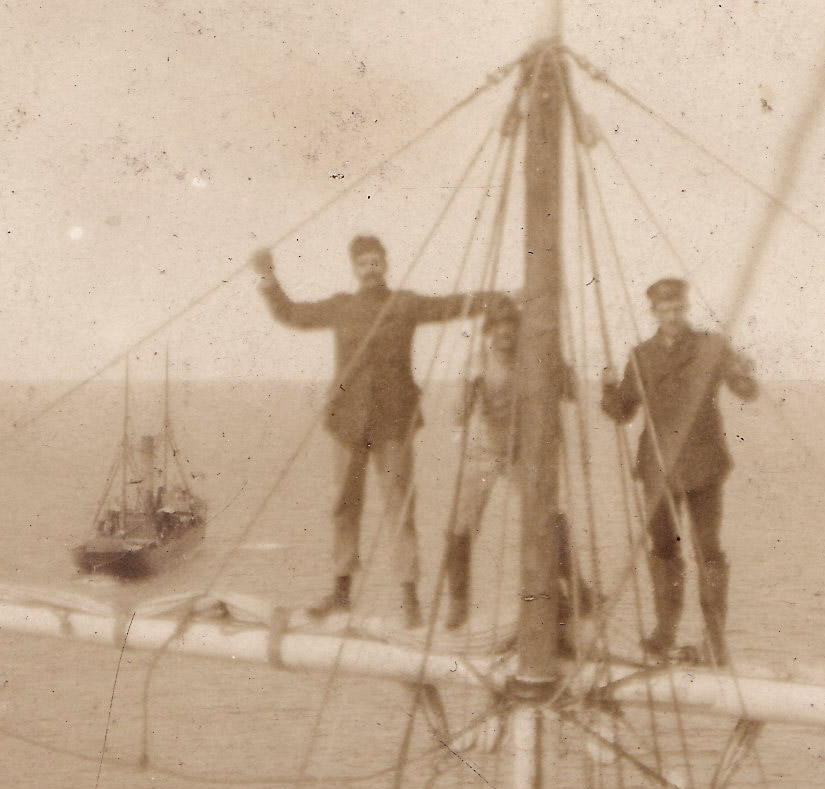
Buckley (left) with Jameson Adams and Alistair Mackay in the rigging of the Nimrod; Koonya in the background

George Buckley CBE DSO (25 October 1866 – 10 November 1937) was a New Zealand farmer, soldier and adventurer. He ventured partway to Antarctica with the British Antarctic Expedition led by Ernest Shackleton.

== Early life ==
George Alexander Maclean Buckley was born on 25 October 1866 at his parents' homestead, Casteron, in the Christchurch suburb Heathcote Valley. His father was George Buckley, who at the time of his birth was a member of the Canterbury Provincial Council. Buckley had a least one sibling, a sister, Ruby; she would go on to marry Arthur Rolleston. From 1878 to 1880, Buckley boarded at Condell's House to attend Christ's College. He finished his education in England at Cheltenham College.

Buckley joined the British Army in 1885, initially serving with the East Lancashire Regiment. He subsequently was posted to India where he served with the Hampshire Regiment. He left the British Army following his marriage to Mabel Warren in 1890. She was the daughter of Francis Warren of Slough in Berkshire. The couple went on to have three children. He returned to New Zealand, joining the military forces in which he served until 1900. He farmed at Lagmhor, a locality inland from Ashburton and to the west of the Ashburton River South Branch; the estate was given to him in 1899 by his uncle, John McLean. A sizeable sheep station at the time, Buckley soon started selling off sections of land. The last section of about 4,000–5,000 acres, on which 11,000 sheep was run, was sold off in 1913.

== Antarctic journey ==
In July 1907, Ernest Shackleton mounted the British Antarctic Expedition, an attempt to reach the South Pole. The expedition provisioned its ship, the Nimrod, at Lyttelton, near Christchurch in New Zealand, in late November and into December. There was much interest in New Zealand in the expedition, and it received several donations including from Buckley, who contributed £500. According to a letter written by Shackleton to his wife Emily, Buckley had promised a further £1000 if the expedition reached the South Pole.

Buckley managed to join the expedition, securing passage aboard merely two hours prior through a personal appeal to Shackleton to be transported as far as the pack ice. Rushing to gather his effects in time, he boarded the Nimrod shortly before it departed Lyttelton for Antarctica on 1 January 1908. "Surely a record in the way of joining a Polar expedition", Shackleton is reported to have said at the time. To conserve its fuel for exploring the Antarctic, Nimrod was towed south by the Koonya as far as the pack ice, which it reached on 14 January. During his two-week service on Nimrod, Buckley helped care for the expedition's horses and dogs. While the crew of the Koonya slaughtered ten sheep on deck and sent the carcasses to the Nimrod as fresh meat for their further journey, the sailors of the Nimrod gave Buckley a champagne toast before transferring him to a whaleboat and onto the Koonya for return to New Zealand.

Buckley moved to the United Kingdom soon afterwards, living near Crawley, in the English county of Sussex. He remained friendly with Shackleton, and it was while visiting Buckley at his home that Shackleton took ill with heart problems. Shackleton refused to seek medical care and Buckley had to send him home in his own vehicle.

== First World War ==
On the outbreak of the First World War, Buckley rejoined his previous British Army unit, the Hampshire Regiment, being posted to its 12th Battalion. He was subsequently appointed commander of the 7th Battalion, Leinster Regiment. In November 1916, Buckley was appointed a Companion of the Distinguished Service Order for conspicuous gallantry during the Battle of Guillemont. The citation for the DSO was published in The London Gazette and read:

For conspicuous gallantry in action. He led his battalion with the greatest courage and determination. He has on many previous occasions done very fine work.

— London Gazette, No. 29824, 14 November 1916

In the 1919 King's Birthday Honours, Buckley was made a Commander of the Order of the British Empire, for valuable services rendered in connection with the war.

== Later life ==
In his later years, Buckley continued to be physically active. He regularly sailed in the seas around Scandinavian Europe and also undertook extensive motor car journeys as far as the Balkan countries. He had recently returned from Turkey when he died suddenly in London on 10 November 1937. His wife had predeceased him in 1929.

Buckley is the namesake for two features in Antarctica: Buckley Island, an island proximate to Beardmore Glacier, and Mount Buckley, an ice-free peak, 2,555 metres (8,383 ft) high, of Buckley Island. Both were discovered by Shackleton's Nimrod expedition of 1907–09.

Buckley owned Shuna Island in Loch Linnhe near Appin.

== Sources ==
- Acland, L. G. D. (1946). The Early Canterbury Runs: Containing the First, Second and Third (new) Series. Christchurch: Whitcombe & Tombs.
- Huntford, Roland (1986) [1985]. Shackleton. New York: Atheneum. ISBN 0-689-11429-X.
- Peat, Neville (2012). Shackleton's Whiskey. Auckland: Random House New Zealand. ISBN 978-1-86979-946-5.
- Scholefield, Guy (1950) [1913]. New Zealand Parliamentary Record, 1840–1949 (3rd ed.). Wellington: Govt. Printer.
