= Purity of arms =

Ethical doctrine of the Israel Defense Forces

Purity of arms (Hebrew: טוהר הנשק, romanized: Tohar HaNeshek) is one of the core values listed in the "Spirit of the Israel Defense Forces". It is described as the following:

The IDF servicemen and women will use their weapons and force only for the purpose of their mission, only to the necessary extent and will maintain their humanity even during combat. IDF soldiers will not use their weapons and force to harm human beings who are not combatants or prisoners of war, and will do all in their power to avoid causing harm to their lives, bodies, dignity and property.

— Spirit of the Israel Defense Forces

The assertion of this ethical code by Israel has historically spurred controversy over the course of the Arab–Israeli conflict. Many Israeli war crimes have been documented, including the use of torture, killing of civilians and prisoners of war, indiscriminate attacks, collective punishment and starvation, as well as the Gaza genocide.

== Moral sources of the code ==
The "Spirit of the IDF", a text within the IDF's main doctrine, requires "honoring the values of the State of Israel as a Jewish and democratic state", referring to both "the tradition of the Jewish People throughout their history" and "universal moral values based on the value and dignity of human life". Jewish religious law does not directly determine IDF policy, and the IDF Doctrine Statement is not a religious document, but its underlying religious basis was articulated by Chief Rabbi Shlomo Goren (1917–1994), who had served in the IDF as both paratrooper and chief chaplain.

According to Rabbi Norman Solomon, the concepts of Havlaga (restraint) and purity of arms arise out of the ethical and moral values stemming from the tradition of Israel, extrapolation from the Jewish law, and the desire for moral approval and hence political support from the world community. Despite doubts when confronted by indiscriminate terrorism, purity of arms remains the guiding rule for the Israeli forces. These foundations have elicited a fair degree of consensus among Jews, both religious and secular.

A notable proponent of this image is Colonel Richard Kemp, a retired British army officer, who called the IDF the most moral army in the world on Israel's Channel 2 News. In a 2015 document regarding Operation Protective Edge, published by Friends of Israel Initiative, the High Level Military Group, composed of military experts from Australia, Colombia, France, Germany, India, Italy, the United Kingdom, the United States, and Spain, acknowledged that Israel made "unprecedented efforts" to avoid civilian casualties exceeding international standards.

In contrast, the 2015 report of the U.N. Human Rights Council on Operation Protective Edge, chaired by Mary McGowan Davis (a former New York state judge), voiced concerns that "the fact that the political and military leadership did not change its course of action, despite considerable information regarding the massive degree of death and destruction in Gaza, raises questions about potential violations of international humanitarian law."

=== Tactical and ethical dilemmas ===
Selective targeting (or targeted killing) of terrorist leaders is considered by the IDF as a legitimate mode of operation and part of a state's counterterrorism, anticipatory, self-defense activities that are designed to prevent the continuation of terrorism. Selective targeting of terrorist activists is used as a measure designed to hurt the real enemy while minimizing civilian casualties. The practice was challenged before the Israeli Supreme Court, which held that while terrorists were civilians under the law of armed conflict, they were not protected by the prohibition in Article 51(3) of Protocol I of the Geneva Conventions, which provides that civilians enjoy immunity from deliberate attack "unless and for such time as they take a direct part in hostilities". The Court found that the meaning of both "for such time" and "direct part in hostilities" covered those providing services to unlawful combatants in any period before a potential attack; therefore terrorists did not qualify for this immunity, a ruling that has been accepted into international law.

The decision received a mixed reception from the international community, with one scholar expressing concern that it threatened "to undermine international law's protection of civilians in armed conflict by shifting the balance toward military advantage and increasing the likelihood of collateral damage".

== Criticism ==
Some challenge the idea that the IDF is either particularly moral or follows the concept of "Purity of Arms", but according to Gideon Levy, the "majority of Israelis are still deeply convinced that their army, the IDF, is the most moral army of the world, and nothing else". Criticism of the concept has centered on its consistency with international law, and the tendency for civilians to be killed in the process. Certain actions that have marked the army's history are at the origins of the criticism. Among these are massacres that took place during the 1948 War, at Qibya, at Kafr Qasim, against prisoners of war, failure to prevent Sabra and Shatila massacre, or at Qana. To these may be added controversial operations such as the Battle of Jenin, Operation Cast Lead, and the 2010 Gaza flotilla raid. A number of these events led to rifts in Israeli society. The massacre of Sabra and Shatila in particular occasioned demonstrations that assumed a historic dimension within Israel.

According to Avi Shlaim, "purity of arms" is one of the key features of "the conventional Zionist account or old history" whose "popular-heroic-moralistic version of the 1948 war" is "taught in Israeli schools and used extensively in the quest for legitimacy abroad". Benny Morris adds, "[t]he Israelis' collective memory of fighters characterized by "purity of arms" is also undermined by the evidence of [the dozen case] of rapes committed in conquered towns and villages." According to him, "after the war, the Israelis tended to hail the "purity of arms" of its militiamen and soldiers to contrast this with Arab barbarism, which on occasion expressed itself in the mutilation of captured Jewish corpses. (...) This reinforced the Israelis' positive self-image and helped them 'sell' the new state abroad and (...) demonized the enemy."

Following the Qibya massacre, Yeshayahu Leibowitz questioned the moral character of operations of the Israeli army. He pointed out that contrary to the time of diaspora, Jews established in Israel have the possibility to resort to force and that while in 1948 they may have had no choice, at Qibya the Israeli nation showed its moral limits.

A former head of the Mossad, Zvi Zamir, stated that the fact that Israel Defense Forces soldiers have shot at unarmed people on the Syrian–Israeli border in 2011 showed the IDF's "purity of arms" was being eroded.

Omar Shahabudin McDoom cites the "most moral army in the world" slogan, which he says is used to argue that Israel is a morally superior country that cannot commit atrocities, as a tactic in Gaza genocide denial.

=== Rabbinic dissent ===
Some rabbis have voiced their opposition to the stipulation of avoiding harm to non-combatants, arguing that Jewish law specifically rejects this requirement during wartime. Some instances:

- Rabbis associated with the Israeli settlement movement in the West Bank and Gaza Strip demanded in 2004 that terrorism must be fought without regard for the safety of the enemy civilian population.
- During the 2006 Lebanon War, the main organization of Modern Orthodox rabbis in the United States called on the Israeli military to be less concerned with avoiding civilian casualties on the opposing side. They argue that Hezbollah hides among the civilian population, and therefore it would be immoral not to attack Hezbollah—as Hezbollah poses an extreme threat to the Israeli civilian population.

== See also ==
- Hasbara
- Havlagah
