= Buckley Island (Antarctica) =

Mountain massif in Ross Dependency, Antarctica

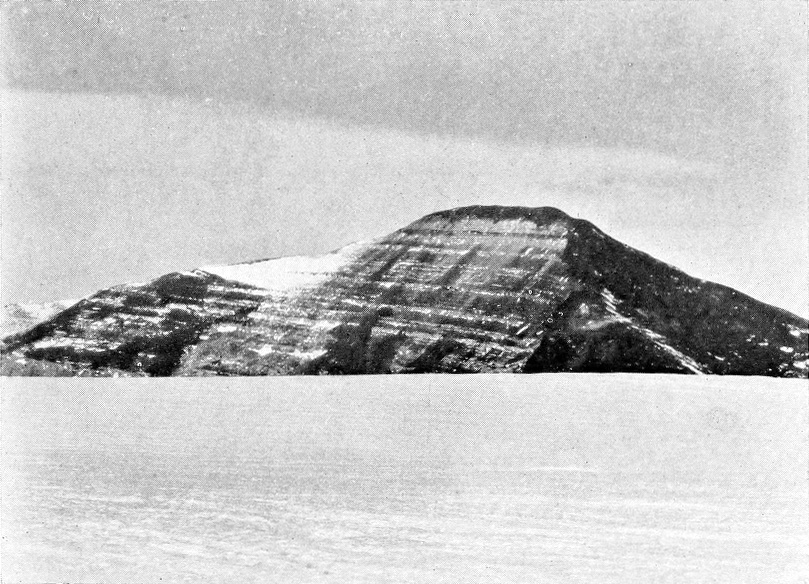
- Buckley Island photographed circa 1911

- Location within Antarctica

Geography
- Location: Beardmore Glacier
- Coordinates: 84°57′S 164°0′E
- Highest elevation: 2,645 m (8678 ft)
- Highest point: Mount Buckley

Administration
- Antarctica

Buckley Island (84°57′S 164°0′E) is an island-like mountain massif, surmounted by the peaks of Mount Bartlett, Mount Buckley and Mount Bowers, rising above the ice at the middle of the head of Beardmore Glacier in Antarctica. It was discovered by the British Antarctic Expedition (1907-09) and named in association with Mount Buckley, 2,645 metres (8,678 ft), its highest peak.

== Peaks ==
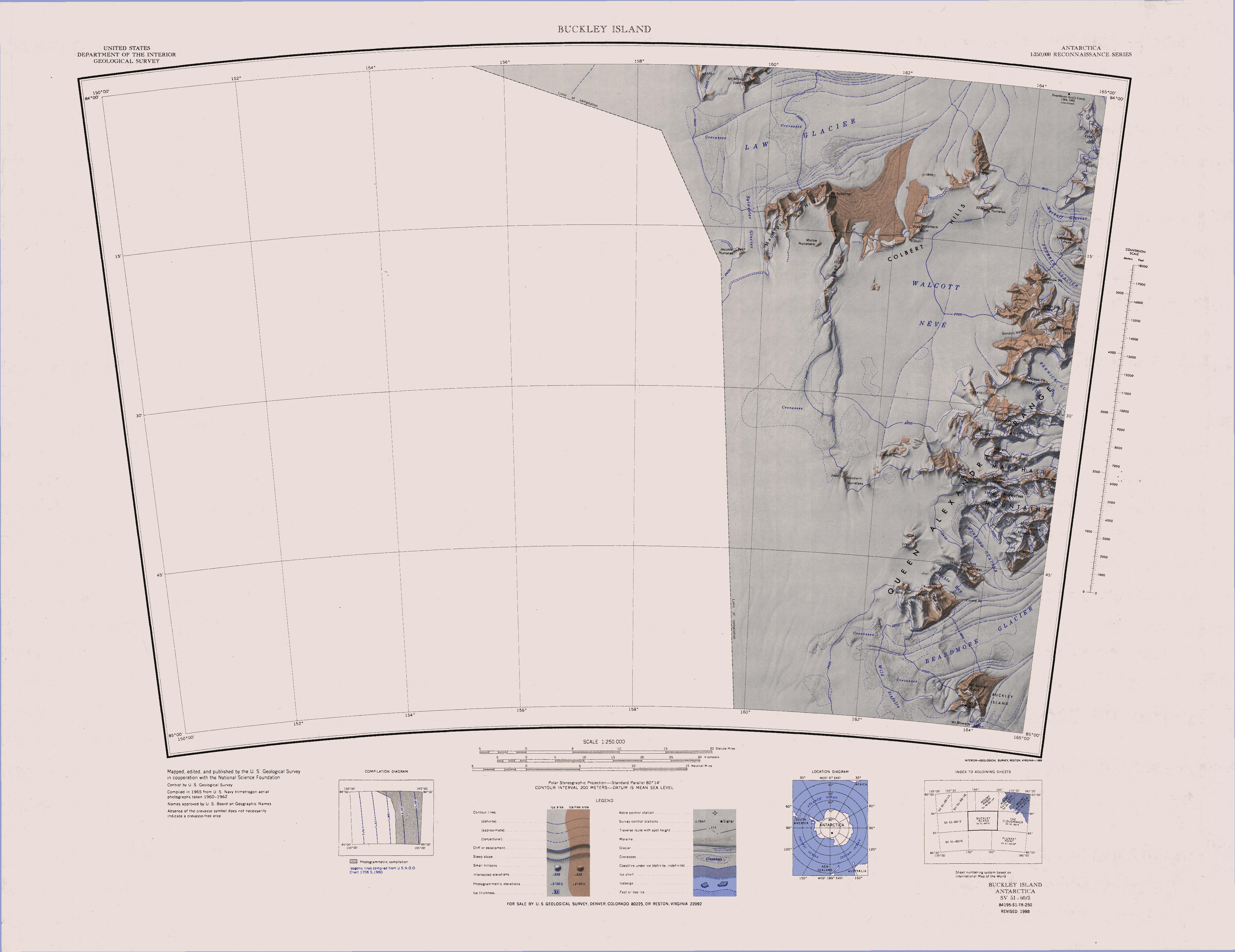
Buckley Island (southwest corner)

=== Mount Bartlett ===
84°56′S 163°56′E. An ice-free mountain, 2,560 metres (8,400 ft) high, standing 2 nautical miles (3.7 km; 2.3 mi) north of Mount Buckley at the head of the Beardmore Glacier. Discovered by the BrAE (1907-09) and named for H.H. Bartlett of London, a supporter of the expedition.

=== Mount Buckley ===
84°58′S 163°56′E. An ice-free peak, 2,645 metres (8,678 ft) high, which is the central and highest summit of Buckley Island, a mountain massif at the head of Beardmore Glacier. Discovered by the BrAE (1907-09) and named for George Buckley of New Zealand, a supporter of the expedition.

=== Mount Bowers ===
85°00′S 164°05′E. A peak, 2,430 metres (7,970 ft) high, standing 2 nautical miles (3.7 km; 2.3 mi) south-south-east of Mount Buckley, at the head of the Beardmore Glacier. Named by the BrAE (1910-13) for Lt. Henry R. Bowers, who accompanied Scott to the South Pole and lost his life on the return journey.

=== Mount Darwin ===
85°02′S 163°08′E. A prominent but low-lying, ice free mountain at the head of Beardmore Glacier, about 5 nautical miles (9.3 km; 5.8 mi) west-south-west of Mount Bowers. Discovered by the BrAE (1907-09) and named after Maj. Leonard Darwin, President of the Royal Geographical Society from 1908-11 (also a son of Charles Darwin).

== Sources ==
- Alberts, Fred G., ed. (1995), Geographic Names of the Antarctic (PDF) (2 ed.), United States Board on Geographic Names This article incorporates public domain material from websites or documents of the United States Board on Geographic Names.
