= Black Sunday (1937) =

Spree of Zionist violence in Mandatory Palestine

- Part of the 1936–1939 Arab revolt in Palestine
- Location: Jaffa and Jerusalem, Palestine
- Date: 14 November 1937
- Target: Palestinian Arabs
- Attack type: Terrorism, Mass shooting
- Deaths: 10
- Injuries: 13+
- Perpetrator: Irgun

Black Sunday was a day of multiple terrorist attacks against Palestinians committed by the militant Revisionist Zionist organization the Irgun. The attacks took place on 14 November 1937 in Mandatory Palestine. It was among the first challenges to the Havlagah (lit. restraint) policy not to retaliate against Arab attacks on Jewish civilians.

== Background ==
In 1936, Palestinian Arabs launched a revolt that was to last three years against British colonial rule. At first the revolt consisted of a general strike but later became more violent, attacking British forces and also including attacks against Jews. In the preceding year Jewish immigration, blocked in the United States and many European countries had risen to 66,672 over the 4,075 in 1931. In July 1937, the Peel Commission proposed a partition of Palestine, and recommended a population transfer of 225,000 Arabs out of the designated future Jewish territory and a smaller number of Jews out of the designated future Arab territory. The Zionist Organization was strongly divided on the proposal, but historians consider them to have either "accepted" or "not rejected outright" the principle of partition, while rejecting the specific borders suggested by the Peel Commission and empowering the executive to continue negotiating with the British. The Arab Higher Committee rejected the plan outright, as did the Revisonist Zionists. Soon after, a British district commissioner, Lewis Yelland Andrews, known for his repressive measures was assassinated by militant followers of Izz ad-Din al-Qassam outside an Anglican church.

=== Restraint vs. militancy ===
The renewal of Arab violence in October 1937 led to changes in tactics by the Zionists.

The mainstream Zionist approach to the insurgency, set forth by David Ben-Gurion, was to avoid reprisal and rather prioritize the strengthening of defenses in Jewish areas, a policy of Havlagah (lit. Restraint). Notrim and Jewish supernumeraries had however been active after having been recruited by the British army to help repress the Arab revolt. A militant form of Zionism, constituting a paramilitary organization calling itself Irgun soon broke ranks with the Haganah over the issue of restraint. It was dominated by activists who had originally identified with Ze'ev Jabotinsky’s Betar movement, which had been founded in 1923, and eventually evolved into the core of Zionist Revisionism. Jabotinsky himself initially advised a diplomatic approach and held reservations about recourse to measures of retaliation. The Irgun, adopted a policy change from passive defense to active aggression, and considered terrorism against Palestinians a form of deterrence against Arab attacks. The active defense tactic adopted consisted of 4 kinds of assault: (a) assassinations (b) shooting fellahin or urban Arabs (c) ambushes of transport vehicles carrying Arabs and (d) outright terrorist assaults on densely populated Arab areas Some of these practices were not new: on 20 April 1936, 2 Palestinians had been murdered while tending a banana grove, and on 20 April, pedestrians in Tel Aviv and Jerusalem were subject to attacks where guns and hand-grenades were used. In March 1937 right-wing Zionists had thrown a bomb into a coffee house frequented by Arabs in Tel Aviv. Throughout the three years of the revolt, the revisionist group mounted some 60 acts of terrorism against Palestinian targets.

=== Planning ===
In July 1937, Jabotinsky met with Robert Bitker, Moshe Rosenberg and Avraham Stern, the future leader of Lehi, in Alexandria and underwrote, despite his personal reservations, the proposal to have recourse to retaliatory action. Jabotinsky posed only one condition to his assent, that he not be kept informed about too many details. At this stage in the revolt, the Arab uprising had degenerated into, in Colin Shindler’s words, ‘internecine Arab violence and nihilist attacks on Jews.’ Demand for retaliation within the Irgun heightened with the killing of Rabbi Eliezer Gerstein on 3 September while he was en route to pray at the Western Wall. On 11 November, the Irgun murdered 2 Arabs at a Jaffa bus deposit, and wounded a further 5. From 29 October to 11 November, 21 attacks were made against British police and Jews, 5 with bombs, resulting in 11 murders, many of the dead being Jews.

Irgun leader David Raziel authorized a programme of bombing Arab coffee houses, in cities such as Haifa and Rosh Pinah, and attacks around Jerusalem, and on buses travelling between the cities of Tiberias and Safed, in which Black Sunday marked the turning point. Jaa’cov Eliav, the Irgun's master bomb maker, was in charge of the operations generally that led to the November 14 attack, David Raziel organized the attacks in Jerusalem.

== Black Sunday ==
At 7 am. on the morning of 14 November, 2 Arab pedestrians were shot on Aza Street in Rehavia, a neighbourhood in Jerusalem, by Joseph Kremin and Shlomo Trachtman. Raziel had ordered multiple attacks to be undertaken almost simultaneously in order to hamper a coherent police response, and a half an hour later, another two were shot. In both cases, one of the victims survived. Some time later, Zvi Meltser armed an Irgun operative who then attacked an Arab bus, killing 3 passengers and wounding 8. By the end of November 14, 10 Arabs had been killed and many more wounded.

== Aftermath ==
The Irgun commemorated the incidents on 14 November as "the Day of the Breaking of the Havlagah". They regarded the operation as a commemorative symbol evoking the revolt of Judas Maccabeus against the Seleucids. Raziel himself said that the operation had wiped out the shame of the policy of restraint.

There are several notable incidents associated the Jewish insurgency fueled by the Irgun attacks in the summer of 1938.

- 6 July 1938 an Irgun militant in Arab garb planted milk cans loaded with explosives in an Arab market in Haifa killing 21, and wounding 52.
- 25 July 1938 in the same market, operatives left an explosive-filled container marked ‘sour cucumbers’ which, on explosion, resulted in the death of 39 Arabs and the wounding of a further 46
- 26 August 1938, explosives planted in the Jaffa market took a lethal toll of 24 Arabs and 39 wounded.

The British initially took no action against the Irgun itself, but rather arrested members of Jabotinsky's group on suspicion they were connected to the incident. Jabotinsky distanced himself from the action adopted but later spoke of it as 'a spontaneous outbreak of the outraged feelings of the nation's soul.'

The British also enlisted 19,000 Jewish policemen to assist them in countering the insurgency, and eventually organized Special Night Squads. The Irgun revolt effected a change in mainstream Jewish policy also. Despite official shock at these incidents, the tactic of a defensive response underwent reexamination, was found to be ineffective, with the result that the Haganah command began to set up field companies to engage in ambushes. Orde Wingate's night squads and Yitzhak Sadeh's mobile military units (plugot ha'Sadeh), established in December of that year, also exercised an influence on the creation of such clandestine forces. Ben-Gurion in turn had one officer secretly establish pe'ulot meyudahot, or special operation squads specializing in retaliatory operations against Arab terrorists, villages thought to harbor them and, at times, against British units themselves. These squads operated at Ben-Gurion's discretion, and lay outside the official Haganah chain of command.

== See also ==
- Zionist political violence
- List of Irgun attacks
- The Bloody Day in Jaffa
