= Nine Power Treaty Conference =

US delegates at the Nine-Power Treaty Conference. From the left, Stanley Hornbeck, Chief Delegate Norman Davis, Jay P. Moffat, Charles E. Bohlen, and Relations Officer Robert T. Pell

The Nine-Power Treaty Conference or Brussels Conference was convened in late October 1937 as a meeting for the signatories of the Nine Power Treaty to consider "peaceable means" for hastening the end of the renewed conflict between China and Japan, that had broken out in July. This Conference was held in accordance with a provision of the Nine-Power Treaty of 1922. The actual conference was held in Brussels, Belgium, from November 3 to 24, 1937.

== Background ==
Japanese diplomatic isolation and souring of the Japan–U.S. relationship became significant because of the progression of the Second Sino–Japanese War in July 1937. Chiang Kai-shek appealed to the signatories of the Nine-Power Treaty to help resist Japanese aggression. Japan refused to participate in the Conference, maintaining that its dispute with China was outside the purview of the Nine-Power Treaty.

== Convening of the conference ==
On November 3, 1937, the Conference finally opened in Brussels. While the Western powers were in session to mediate the situation, the Chinese troops were making their final stand in Shanghai and had all hopes for a western intervention that would save China from collapse. However, the Conference dragged on with little progress.

== Posture of the United States ==
President Franklin D. Roosevelt and Secretary Hull gave instructions to Norman H. Davis, the U.S. delegate to the conference, stating that the first objective of the foreign policy of the United States was national security, and that consequently the U.S. sought to keep peace and promote the maintenance of peace; that it believed in cooperative effort for the preservation of peace by pacific and practicable means; that this country as a signatory to the Kellogg-Briand Pact had renounced war as an instrument of national policy; and that "public opinion in the United States has expressed its emphatic determination that the United States keep out of war". Mr. Davis was instructed to keep in mind the interest of the United States in peace in the Pacific and in the Far East as evidenced by the Washington Naval Conference, the statements relating to foreign policy made by the President in his Chicago address of October 5, 1937, and the U.S. Government's statement of October 6 on the controversy between China and Japan. In the view of this Government the primary function of the Conference was "to provide a forum for constructive discussion, to formulate and suggest possible bases of settlement, and to endeavor to bring the parties together through peaceful negotiation".

It was emphasized to Davis that if the U.S. were to avoid an ultimate serious clash with Japan, some practical means must be found to check Japanese conquest and to make effective the collective will of the powers which desired the settlement of international controversies by peaceful means; that the Conference might be an agency for bringing to bear upon Japan every moral pressure directed toward bringing about a change in Japanese attitude and policy. Finally, Davis was instructed to "observe closely the trend of public opinion in the United States and take full account thereof."

== November 15 declaration ==
On November 15, 1937, the Conference adopted a declaration affirming that the representatives of 15 states considered the conflict between China and Japan to be of concern to all countries parties to the Nine-Power Treaty and the Kellogg-Briand Pact. In the presence of this difference between the views of the Conference and the Japanese Government, the Conference considered that there was no opportunity at the time for carrying out its terms of reference so far as they related to bringing about peace by agreement.

== Conclusion of conference ==
On November 24, the Nine-Power Treaty Conference convened for the last time and then adjourned indefinitely, without producing any measures that would stop Japanese aggression. At this point, the Washington System had completely collapsed.

In a declaration, dated November 24, 1937, the Conference stated that it strongly reaffirmed the principles of the Nine-Power Treaty; that it believed that a satisfactory settlement between China and Japan could not be achieved by direct negotiation between the parties to the conflict alone and that an acceptable agreement could be achieved only by consultation with other powers principally concerned; that it strongly urged that hostilities be suspended and resort be had to peaceful processes; that the Conference deemed it advisable temporarily to suspend its sittings; that the conflict remained, however, a matter of concern to all the powers assembled at Brussels; and that the Conference would be called together again when it was considered that deliberations could be advantageously resumed.

The United States delegate reported at the conclusion of the Conference that it had demonstrated the "unwillingness of Japan to resort to methods of conciliation" and that the Japanese continued to insist that the issues between Japan and China were exclusive to those two countries whereas the Conference powers, with the exception of Italy, affirmed that the situation was of concern to all members of the family of nations.

In his report, General Chen Cheng wrote that throughout much of the Shanghai campaign, sound military strategy was often supplanted by political strategy. It was the nation's tragedy that political strategy, especially the one as precarious as the hope for foreign intervention, forced the troops to make exorbitant sacrifices in Shanghai and led almost to total annihilation. He wrote that because China was weak, it was in dire need of foreign help and had to sacrifice just to prove its capacity to fight and will to resist. By the end of the battle, even though hundreds of thousands of Chinese troops died just to make the point that China was ready to sacrifice, the final hope for a western intervention never materialized.
