= Nine-Power Treaty =

1922 treaty affirming the sovereignty and territorial integrity of China

Treaty Between the Nine Powers Concerning China
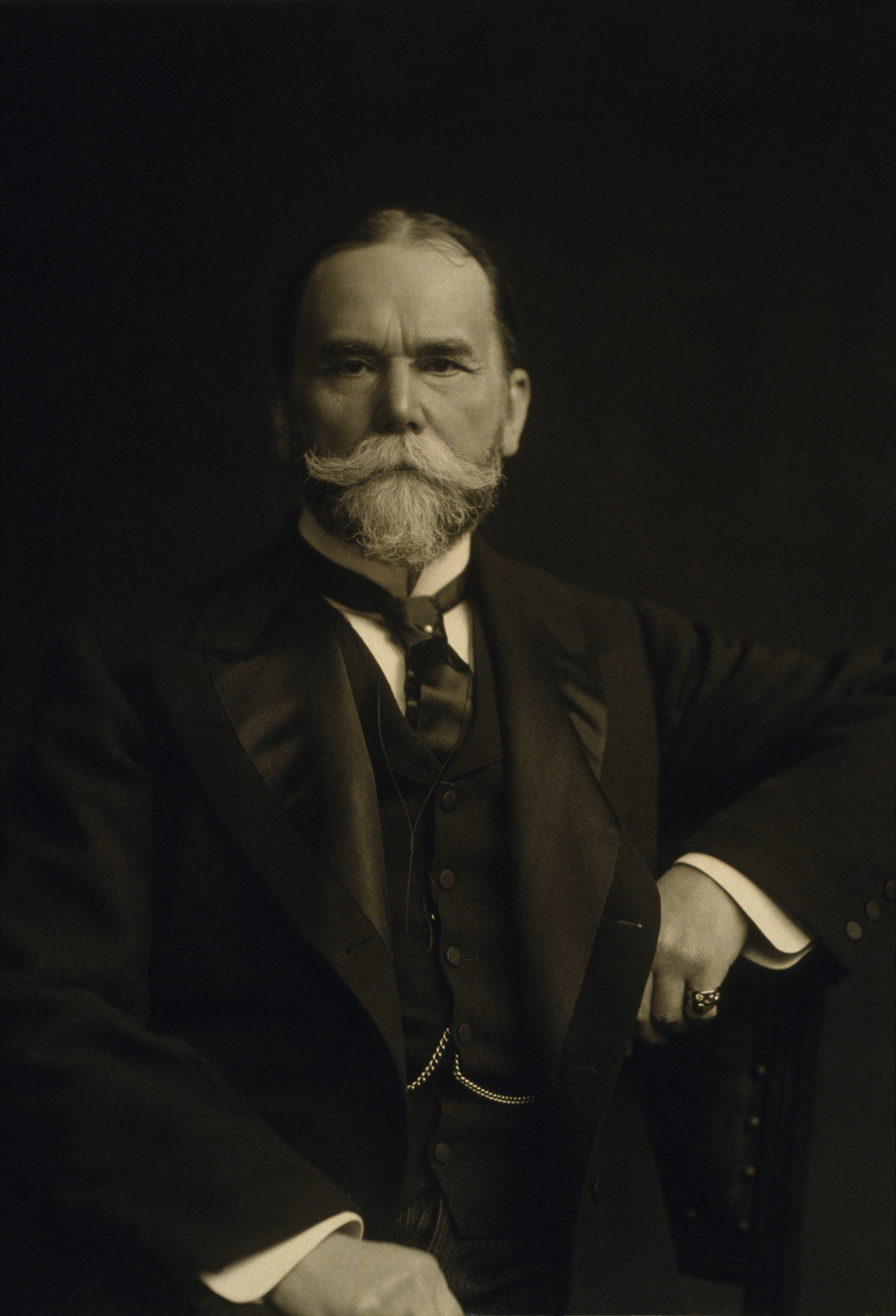
- United States Secretary of State John Hay, the driving force behind the Open Door policy.
- Type: International multilateral treaty
- Context: International codification of the Open Door Policy and stabilization of post-WWI East Asia
- Drafted: November 1921 – January 1922
- Signed: February 6, 1922
- Location: Washington, D.C., United States (Memorial Continental Hall)
- Effective: August 5, 1925
- Condition: Ratification by all signatory powers
- Expiry: 1939 (De facto collapse following the outbreak of the Second Sino-Japanese War)
- Mediators: Warren G. Harding (President of the United States)
- Negotiators: Charles Evans Hughes (U.S. Secretary of State); Elihu Root (U.S. Delegate); Kijūrō Shidehara (Japanese Ambassador to the U.S.); Alfred Sze (Chinese Minister to the U.S.); Arthur Balfour (British Representative)
- Parties: United States; Republic of China; Empire of Japan; United Kingdom; French Third Republic; Kingdom of Italy; Belgium; Netherlands; Portugal
- Ratifiers: United States Senate (ratified March 30, 1922); All other signatory nations
- Depositary: Government of the United States
- Depositaries: Washington, D.C.
- Citations: 38 LNTS 277
- Languages: English; French

Full text
- Nine-Power Treaty at Wikisource
- Severely violated by Japan via the 1931 Mukden Incident and the 1937 invasion of China, rendering the framework broken before WWII.

The Nine-Power Treaty (Kyūkakoku Jōyaku (Japanese: 九カ国条約)) or Nine-Power Agreement (Chinese: 九國公約; pinyin: jiǔ guó gōngyuē) was a 1922 treaty affirming the sovereignty and territorial integrity of the Republic of China as per the Open Door Policy. The Nine-Power Treaty was signed on 6 February 1922 by all of the attendees to the Washington Naval Conference: Belgium, China, France, the United Kingdom, Italy, Japan, the Netherlands, Portugal, and the United States.

== Open Door Policy ==
United States Secretary of State John Hay had issued the "Open Door Notes" of September–November 1899, followed by a diplomatic circular in July 1900, asking that all of the major world powers with vested interests in Qing-dynasty China declare formally that they would maintain an "open door" to allow all nations equal rights and equal access to the treaty ports within their spheres of influence in China. Fearing that the powers of Europe and that Empire of Japan were preparing to carve China up into colonies, Hay also added provisions that Chinese territorial and administrative integrity should be maintained.

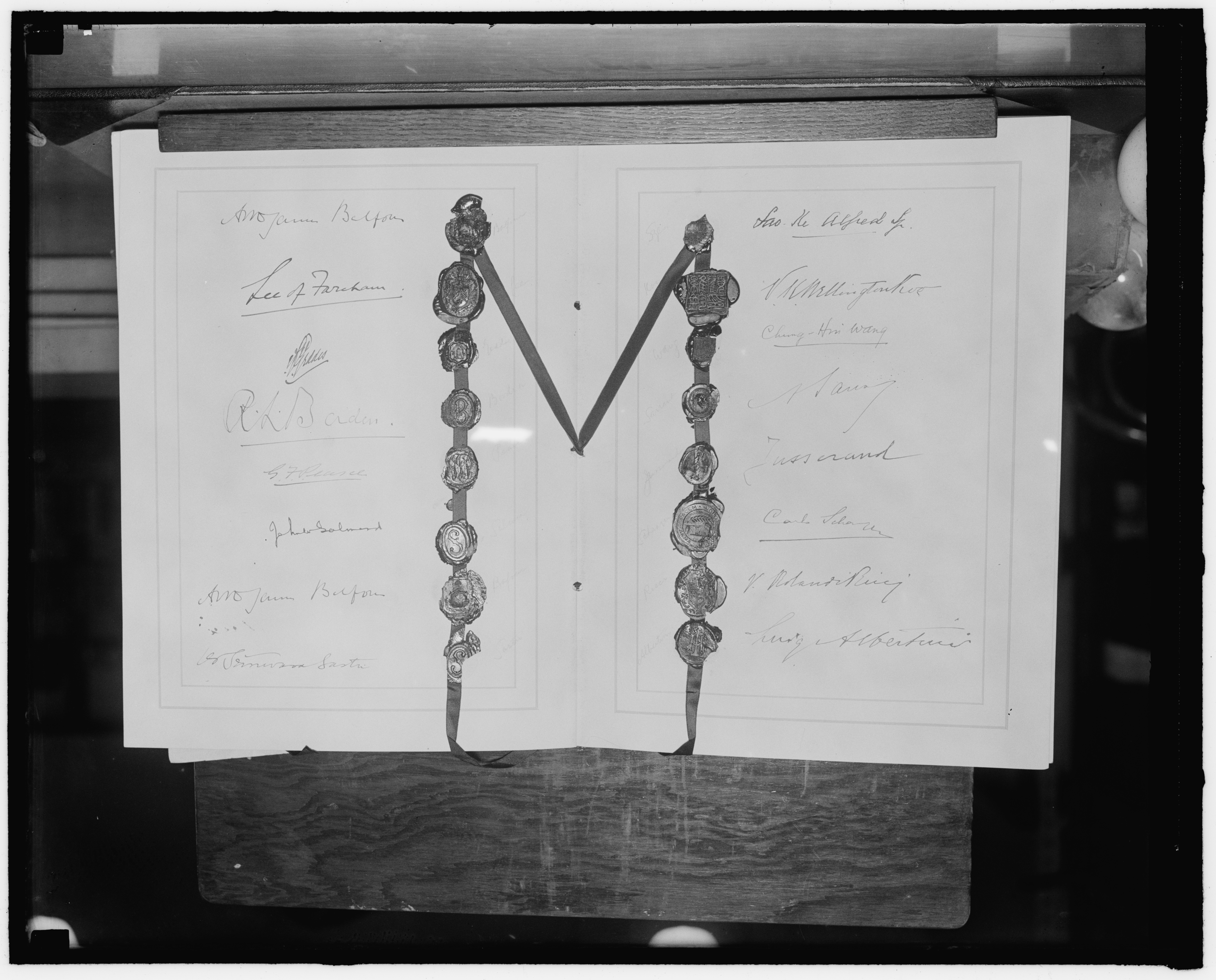
Copy of the treaty

Although no nation specifically affirmed Hay’s proposal, Hay announced that each of the powers had granted consent in principle, and treaties made after 1900 make reference to the Open Door Policy. Nonetheless, competition between the various powers for special concessions within China, including railroad rights, mining rights, loans, treaty ports open to foreign trade, and extraterritorial privileges continued unabated.

The United States was leery of Japanese designs on China, especially after the Russo-Japanese War (1904–1905) and the Twenty-One Demands (1915), and repeatedly signed agreements with the Japanese government pledging to maintain a policy of equality in Manchuria and the rest of Mainland China. Those agreements concluded with Lansing–Ishii Agreement in 1917, which was soon shown to be completely ineffective.

== Washington Naval Conference ==
During the Washington Naval Conference of 1921–1922, the United States government again raised the Open Door Policy as an international issue, and had all of the attendees (United States, Republic of China, Imperial Japan, France, the United Kingdom, Italy, Belgium, Netherlands, and Portugal) sign the Nine-Power Treaty which intended to make the Open Door Policy international law.

The Nine-Power Treaty, concurrent with the Shantung Treaty of the Washington Naval Conference, effectively prompted Japan to return territorial control of Shandong province, of the Shandong Problem, to the Republic of China. The Nine-Power Treaty was one of several treaties concluded at the Washington Naval Conference. Other major agreements included the Four-Power Treaty, the Five-Power Treaty, and the Shangtung Treaty.

== Effectiveness ==
The Nine-Power Treaty lacked any enforcement regulations, and when it was violated by Japan during its invasion of Manchuria in 1931 and creation of Manchukuo, the United States could do little more than issue protests and impose economic sanctions.

In November 1937, the signatories of the Nine-Power Treaty convened in Brussels for the Nine Power Treaty Conference after the outbreak of the Second Sino-Japanese War but to no avail. However, the treaty eventually had a role in checking Japanese aggression during the 1932 Battle of Shanghai.

World War II effectively ended the Nine-Power Treaty.

== Sources ==
- Baer, George (1996). One Hundred Years of Sea Power: The U.S. Navy, 1890-1990. Stanford University Press. ISBN 0-8047-2794-5.
- Ellis, L. Ethan. Republican foreign policy, 1921-1933. Rutgers University Press, 1968. pp. 79–136.
- Fenwick, C. G. "The Nine Power Treaty and the Present Crisis in China". American Journal of International Law 31.4 (1937): 671-674. JSTOR 2190677.
- Lamb, Margaret (2001). From Versailles to Pearl Harbor: The Origins of the Second World War in Europe and Asia. Palgrave Macmillan. ISBN 0-333-73840-3.
- Myer, Carl L (1936). Treaty Relations Between the United States and the Far East (with Special Reference to the Four-Power, Five-Power, and Nine-Power Treaties). Library of Congress Legislative Reference Service. ASIN B0008D24WG.
