= Mount Buckley =

Mountain in Ross Dependency, Antarctica

Mount Buckley (84°58′S 163°56′E) is an ice-free peak, 2,645 metres (8,680 ft) high, which is the central and highest summit of Buckley Island, a mountain massif at the head of Beardmore Glacier. It was discovered by the British Antarctic Expedition, 1907–09, and named for George Buckley of New Zealand, a supporter of the expedition.
