= Havlagah =

Yishuv strategic policy during the Arab revolt in Palestine

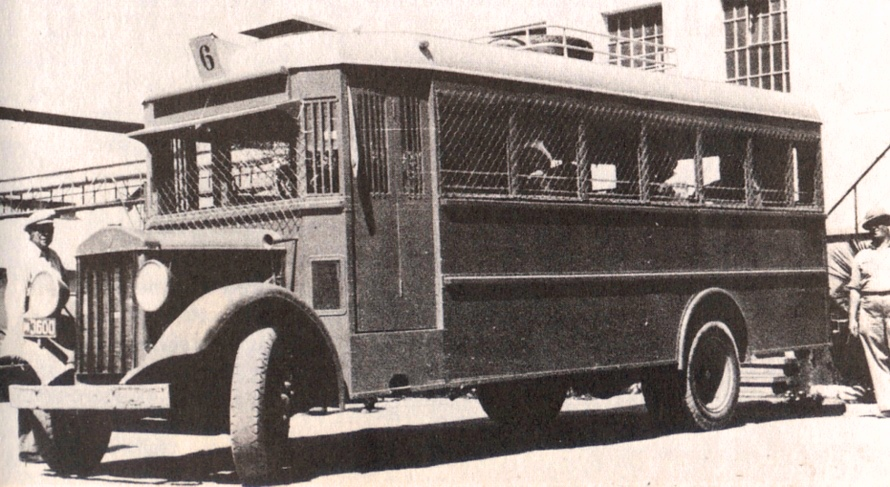
Example of the Havlagah strategy: a bus used by Jews with mesh covering the doors and windows in order to protect against Arab attacks during the 1936–1939 Arab revolt in Palestine.

Havlagah (Hebrew: הַהַבְלָגָה, romanized: ha-Havlagah, lit. 'The Restraint') was the strategic policy of the Yishuv during the 1936–1939 Arab revolt in Palestine. It called for Zionist militants to abstain from engaging in acts of retaliatory violence against Palestinian Arabs in the face of Arab attacks against Jews, and instead encouraged the Jewish community to respond to the attacks through non-violent means, such as by fortifying their settlements.

The policy was supported by the Yishuv's political leadership and many left-wing Zionists. It was adopted by Haganah, the main Zionist paramilitary in Mandatory Palestine, as an official operational strategy.

On the other hand, Irgun, Lehi, and other like-minded Zionist paramilitaries rejected the policy and engaged in indiscriminate violence against the Arab community.

== Support ==
The Havlagah policy was seen by many Jews, including the Zionist leadership, as a source of pride; it was a framework by which they morally differentiated themselves from their Arab rivals.

=== Jewish National Council of Palestine ===
The Jewish National Council posted an announcement in support of the policy:

Not with pouring innocent blood our holies' blood would be forgiven, but with new methods to promote our project and a never-ending aiming at new actions for our freedom. For our deep sorrow, Jerusalem had seen revenge actions at Arabs, which had stained the honor of the Jewish settlement and put in danger the peace of Jerusalem. The National Council gathering... horrified about these crimes, subverting the moral basics of Judaism and Zionism, spreading hatred in this region's nations and can bring a tragedy for the Jewish settlement and the whole land.

=== Workers' Party of the Land of Israel ===
Berl Katznelson, a leader of Mapai, stated that the Havlagah policy is a form of self-defense meaning "righteousness of weapon" and not hurting innocent life:

Havlagah means our weapon will be pure. We learn weapon, we carry weapon, we resist those who come to attack us, but we do not want our weapon to be stained with blood of innocents... Havlagah is both a political and a moral system, caused by our history and reality, our behavior and the conditions of our fight. If we were not loyal to ourselves and adopted a different strategy, we would have lost the fight a long time ago.

David Ben-Gurion, who later became the first Israeli prime minister, supported the Havlagah policy for more practical reasons. He noted that the restraint would bring about a good relationship with Britain and a generally positive sentiment to the Zionist ideology in the world, thereby helping the Jewish effort:

For political reasons, we should not act like the Arabs... The Arabs are fighting England, and their political interest is to fight England because they want to banish it from the land they believe belongs to them. We do not wish to banish England; on the contrary, we want to get it closer to this land, attract it, make it purchase this land and help us return to the Land of Israel.

=== Chief Rabbinate of Palestine ===
Yitzhak HaLevi Herzog, the erstwhile Palestinian Chief Rabbi, also supported the policy:

We are now standing in a very hard position... I said to one man who came to argue with me: If I will be shot and become a moribund, I would command all of Israel and the Yishuv to be careful and to abstain [from] any revenge actions. We should not learn the way of the violent non-Jews. What have we reached for two years? A great achievement, Kiddush HaShem, and here in the Land of Israel, the Yishuv showed for two years a pure spirit, gave an expression for this Jewish institute, yes, this is a great achievement...

== Opposition ==
Irgun, reacting to the Arab attacks with more violence and rejecting the general consensus of the Yishuv, referred to themselves as the "Havlagah breakers". Their vision was attacking offensively for guaranteed self-defense, and Irgun militants consequently engaged in indiscriminatory acts of violence that included targeting Arab civilians in response to Arab attacks on Jewish civilians.

=== Ze'ev Jabotinsky and Revisionist Zionists ===
Ze'ev Jabotinsky, leader of the Revisionist movement said:

... I have mentioned the word "Havlagah", a rare word, never heard before in modern, every-day-life Hebrew language in the Land of Israel. It seems this word is now the most common and hated word in the Land of Israel... The Jews should not distort the facts and complain. In the Land of Israel there are young political activists from the left and the right who are not afraid to clash with British soldiers, who are forcing them to act like cowards. They do not fear about their own lives, they fear for the destruction of the 1917 Balfour declaration and the violation of the alliance between England and Jewish people... Any indigenous people will fight foreign settlers as long as they believe there is a chance to get rid of the foreign settlement danger. This is how the Arabs in the Land of Israel are acting and will act in the future, as long as they have the spark in their hearts that they could stop the transformation of Palestine into the Land of Israel... Therefore our settlement can (only) grow under a force which is not dependent upon the local population, behind an "iron wall" that the local population could not break.

— Ze'ev Jabotinsky

=== Irgun ===
David Raziel, commander of Irgun, said that violent reaction will bring an end to the Arab terrorism, because the hostile Arabs "understand power only":

The Arab terrorism and its loyal friend; the Jewish restraint, created a situation in which a Jew must avoid many jobs because death was waiting for him on the roads, while an Arab could go anywhere he wants in freedom and do everything he wishes, even in a pure Jewish environment. That is how the Jews' financial lives suffered while the Arabs continued with their normal lives and normal jobs. Defensive actions only will never bring victory. If the purpose of war is breaking the enemy's spirit, it is impossible without breaking his power, so it is obvious that defensive actions only are not enough ... All these calculations lead to one conclusion: one who does not want to be defeated has no option but attack. ... He should storm his enemy and break his power and desire. Before the enemy will do his attack, he must neutralize the enemy's ability to attack ...

— David Raziel

Part of a proclamation 5 months before the 1948 Arab–Israeli War:

"End the passive self-defense! We shall go to the killers' nests and eliminate them! We do not have a quarrel with the Arab people. We seek peace with the near-by nations. But we will cut off the hands of murderers with no mercy. And the murderers are not only inflamed Arab rioters, they are also – or mostly – the emissaries of Nazi sympathizers in Britain."

== In Israel ==
=== Second Intifada (2000–2005) ===
Ariel Sharon, shortly after his election as Israeli Prime Minister in the 2001 elections, expressed an unexpected response to the Palestinian terrorism, declaring that "Restraint is Power". In the first two weeks of Sharon's leadership, 20 Israeli civilians were killed by terrorist attacks and Sharon suffered serious criticism from fellow Likud members, such as Benjamin Netanyahu. In this period the terrorist attacks against Israel (such as the Dolphinarium discotheque bombing) escalated. In Sharon's February 2002 national speech he said:

I know it is not easy to speak in these days, but continue to be patient. I said restraint is power and I say today – insistence is power too. We have already proved that. It is hard for us – for me – but I request you to continue with this (the restraint). The financial situation and the security situation are not easy, but together, and together only, we can overcome it.

— Ariel Sharon

Shortly after March 2002, when 130 Israeli civilians were killed by terrorist attacks, Israel commenced Operation Defensive Shield.

== See also ==
- Labor Zionism
- Black Sunday, 1937
