= Koonya (1887) =

Australian steamboat

Coordinates: 34.042876°S 151.206777°E

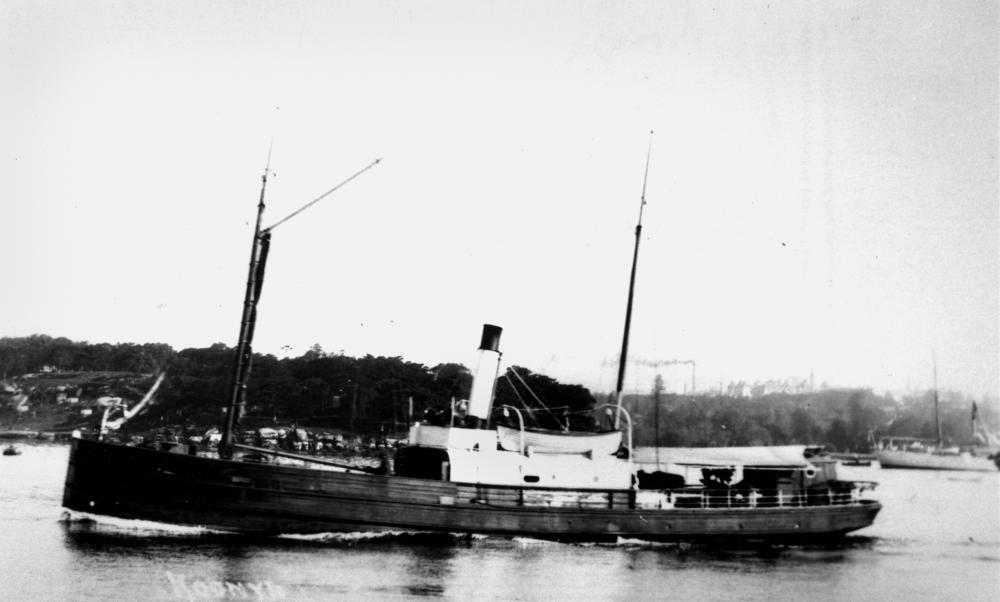
- SS Koonya

History
- Name: Koonya
- Owner: Moruya Steam Navigation Company
- Port of registry: Sydney
- Builder: William Bayes Hobart, Tasmania, Australia
- Completed: 1887
- Identification: Registration number: 17/1896; Official number: 57614
- Fate: Lost 25 January 1898 at Doboy reef off North end of Cronulla Beach Port Hacking

General characteristics
- Type: Wood carvel Steamer screw
- Tonnage: 119 GRT
- Displacement: 80 NRT
- Length: 32.67 m
- Beam: 5.913 m
- Draught: 2.926 m
- Installed power: Compound 30 hp
- Crew: Unknown

The Koonya was a wood carvel screw steamer built in 1887 at Hobart, that was wrecked when it stuck the shore at Doboy reef whilst carrying passengers & cargo between Moruya and Sydney and was lost off Cronulla Beach, Port Hacking, New South Wales on 25 January 1898.

The vessel was originally built by William Bayes of Hobart and owned by the Risby Bros merchants and used to trade between Hobart and the Tasman's Peninsula as well as running a number of pleasure cruises. In 1888 the ownership changed and the vessel started trading to the West Coast of Tasmania often used to carry gold, silver and tin back from the mines on the west coast. During this period it was involved with two collisions and a number of smaller incidences. Finally in 1898 ownership was transferred to the Moruya Steam Navigation Company and the vessel commenced weekly runs between Sydney and Moruya before finally running ashore to the south of Sydney.

== Construction ==
The SS Koonya was named in the Tasmanian aboriginal dialect after the portion of the island Sorell The vessel was custom built for the Risby Bros merchants in Tasmania by the well-known local shipbuilder William Bayes at Tilly's shipyard, Battery Point. at the time it was thought that the vessel

"was in every way creditable to that gentleman, who had both designed and built her. Mr. Hayes was to a certain extent a self-taught man, and as a consequence the boat was all the more a credit to him. (Cheers.) It would be a loss, to the whole colony were such a man to leave its shores, therefore he trusted that sufficient inducement would be always provided to keep him here. (Hear, hear.)"

The vessel was originally intended to be launched on Saturday 7 May 1887 but owing to the unfavourable state of the tide the ceremony was postponed until Tuesday 10 May 1887 where some 400 spectators watched.

Mr. Arthur Risby's eldest daughter performed the ceremony of christening the new craft. The chocks were immediately knocked away, and the vessel glided gradually into the water amidst the cheering of the bystanders. The launch may be termed highly successful, no hitch of any kind taking place, and from the time the first chock was knocked away, 10 minutes did not elapse until the vessel rode in her native element

On the afternoon of the launch, the Koonya was towed around to the crane wharf to have the boiler fitted the next day and the work of fixing the engines and otherwise finishing her. After the launch and the machinery being fitted the steamer was again slipped for several weeks, and several extensive additions made, and she received her final touches on the stocks in Mr. Lucas' yards, Queen's Domain. Her engines were fitted by Messis. Kennedy and Co., and no expense has been spared in painting and decorating both cabins and hull. When originally built the vessel was described at the time of her launching as:

The general appearance of the new craft is built on more symmetrical lines, the Koonya promises to be a fast steamer, and should soon make a name for herself, and prove a profitable investment to her owner, who intends to put her in the Channel and Sorell trade The Koonya is rigged as a fore-and-aft schooner, with a flush deck, surrounded with a Tasmanian Blackwood hand-rail. Her keel, frame, kelson, and bottom planking’s are of blue gum, with a top of Oregon pine, whilst the decks and beams are of kauri, and every bit of timber in her is well seasoned and of the best possible quality. Her dimensions are as follows:- Length on the keel, 110 feet 0 inches (33.53 m)., beam, 20 feet 0 inches (6.10 m)., depth, 9 feet 6 inches (2.90 m)., and she has a carrying capacity of 120tons. on a draft of 7 feet 0 inches (2.13 m) of water. Her engines, which arrived here in the SS Chollerton, are from the well-known works of Ross and Duncan, Glasgow, the firm, and are on the compound surface condensing principle, having a nominal horse-power of 30. The cylinders have an 18 inches (0.46 m) stroke, with a high and-low-pressure of 18 and 26. She is also fitted with a novelty in the shape of a Duncan's patent propeller. A fine commodious cabin, 25 feet 0 inches (7.62 m) x 20 feet 0 inches (6.10 m) is fitted aft, and the owners intend to have it upholstered without regard to expense. On the left of the cabin are the officers quarters, whilst a special compartment for ladies occupies the right side. Coming up on deck a fine bridge spans the vessel amidships, on which the wheel and steering gear is situated. Altogether the boat is a perfect model of her class, and a credit to both builder and owner.

When the vessel made is initial water trial, despite the rain, a large number of spectators assembled on the New Wharf to watch the new boat make her first start. At

About half-past 2 o'clock the word was given to cast off shore lines, and the Koonya glided into midstream, heading for Kangaroo Point Bluff. A wheel is one of the few remaining necessities of the Koonya, but this want was temporarily replaced by lines attached to the rudder, and which were manipulated by two men. Among the bystanders were quick to observe this, and indulged in a little badinage at the expense of the steersman. Some time was spent in cruising about midstream, and the head of the Koonya was turned northward, and after proceeding up the river some little distance it was resolved to return and run the measured mile accordingly the boat was headed down stream, and with 1001b. of steam on it was found that she ran the distance in 6min. 5sec, or at the rate of nearly 10 miles per hour. As the engines are at present new, and therefore work stiffly, the owners calculate that they will shortly be able to considerably exceed that rate but taking it altogether it may fairly be reckoned a very good performance

== Service history ==
=== Risby’s Bros August 1887 – November 1888 ===
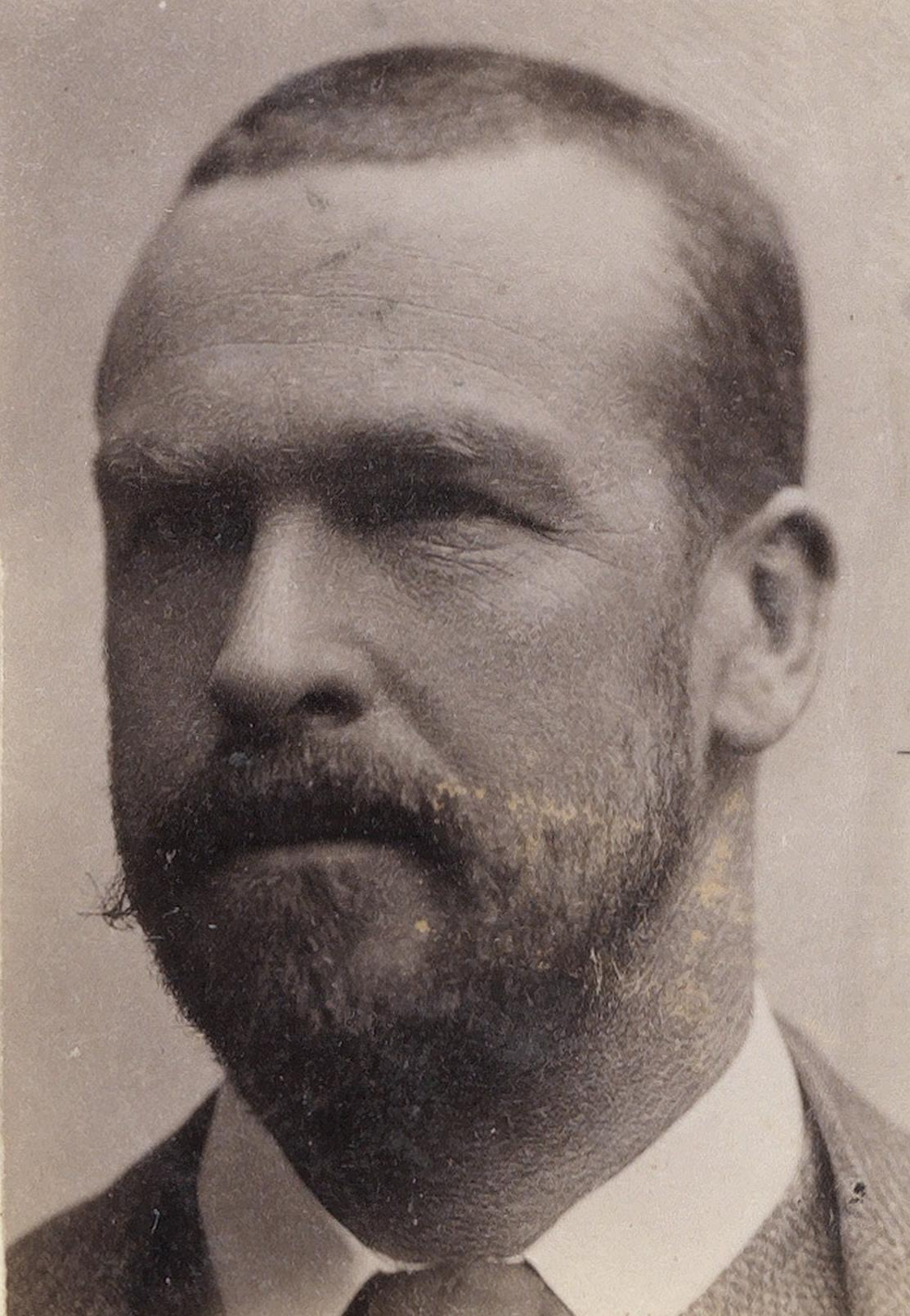
Arther Risby commissioned the SS Koonya to be built

When initially launched Messrs. Risby's Bros secured Mr. William Wilson as the captain, who had until recently held a similar position on board the barque Natal Queen, and Risby's Bros were considered fortunate in having secured the services of such "a genial skipper and good mariner as he is known to be". They then received a packet license for the conveying passengers between Hobart and Tasman's Peninsula to Sorell and Channel ports. The vessel's maiden voyage was between Hobart, Tasman's Peninsula, East Bay Neck, and Lewisham on Monday 15 August 1887, with" a profusion of bunting being displayed from the rigging " it was then intended that the vessel leave Hobart every Monday and Thursday at 8:00 a.m., returning from Lewisham, via intermediate calling places every Tuesday and Friday.,

Within a month of this first voyage the Koonya ran aground alongside the wharf, at North West Bay and hours after midnight the Koonya was refloated, and had a good run back to Hobart. By 16 January 1888 the SS Koonya had broken two propellers by striking sunken piles at Cascades and Impression Bay. This was the first of many such accidents; later a craft was engaged in shifting the sunken piles away from the steamers track. In April 1888 William Wilson, master of the SS Koonya, was charged by the harbour master, Captain Riddle, with a breach of the Marine Board regulations by carrying an excessive complement of passengers on board the steamer. The SS Koonya had taken a government charter on her first trip to the West Coast of Tasmania and a large number of Government men and a greater number of passengers were on board as there were no means of getting these men round to Trial Harbour except by water. The trip occupied only 23 hours, there was no danger or inconvenience William Wilson, master of the SS Koonya admitted the breach of the regulations and was given a penalty of 5s for each passenger carried over the number prescribed by law, in addition to a fine of two guineas, with professional and other costs.

=== United Steamship Co. November 1888 – May 1896 ===
We are informed by Captain Miles that he has purchased the SS. Koonya from Messrs. -Risby Bros, for the sum of £4,500. Captain Miles resold her shortly afterwards to the -United Steamship Co., of Launceston, at an advance. The new owners of the Koonya intend, to run a weekly service between Hobart and Macquarie Harbour.

The vessel was handed over to the United Steamship Co on Monday 19 November 1888. In January 1889 the Koonya was altered affecting her passenger accommodation as when re surveyed she was entitled to carry.

Sea Condition	Original Number of Passengers	Revised Number of Passengers
In smooth water	375	347
In partly rough water	228	211
In rough water	160	151
At sea (including crew)	32	40

In October 1889 there was an accident aboard the vessel:

The obliging chief officer of the SS Koonya met with an accident by getting one of his feet crushed, which has necessitated his being obliged to lay up for a time, and another man has been engaged to perform his duties on the ship

By September 1890 the current Captain of the Koonya (Captain Cordell) was leaving to be replaced by Captain J. Madden who had come from the Centennial.

The Koonya again threw off a blade of her propeller while on a trip from Strahan and was required to be slipped to have another fitted. Again while on an excursion to New Norfolk on 10 November 1890 she again lost a propeller, the vessel had left New Norfolk.

on the return journey shortly after 4 O’clock, and all went well until about a mile of the distance had been covered when she collided with some rocks, the result being that the propeller was seriously injured, making a perceptible difference in her speed. Pilot Richardson, who was in charge of the vessel, attributes this accident to a mishap to the steering gear. But little excitement was occasioned-a few of the female passengers indulging in screaming. The journey was pursued, and when Hearing the bridge it was seen that the danger signal was flying, indicating that the bridge would not be opened for vessels to pass through until the up and down trains, 'hen due, had passed. It was decided to bring the Koonya up alongside the pier on the northern side of the bridge, but on the order to "go astern" being given and the engines reversed It was quickly discovered that the propeller, was not sufficiently powerful in its injured condition to take the way off the vessel, and though lines were put out, and every endeavour made to check her, she crashed into the swing portion of the bridge, striking one of the girders with such violence as to bond a portion of it, this having the effect of rendering the bridge unworkable. One of the wheels was also injured. The Koonya was not injured in any degree, a valuable testimony to the stability of her build. It was fortunate that the tide was flowing, for had it been ebbing the vessel would have collided with far greater force. The accident was one in which no blame apparently attaches to anyone. The passengers were brought into town by the special train in connection with the Colebrook races The Koonya will have to remain in her present berth till the bridge can be repaired.

==== Koonya and Pinafore collision ====
The vessel was again involved with significant incidents within six weeks. She collided with another vessel, which was left partially submerged; and the next day stripped three blades off her propeller on a floating log.

A collision occurred on Christmas afternoon between the steamers Koonya and Pinafore. The Koonya, which was returning from her pleasure trip to Oyster Cove, collided with the Pinafore, smashing her stern to the water-line, but sustaining no damage to herself. The Pinafore immediately began to fill, but with the aid of some men the master succeeded in transferring some heavy timber from aft to the fore part of the vessel. Thus trimmed, the Pinafore was taken in tow by the Victory, and towed to the end of the New Wharf, where she now lies partially submerged. The Koonya, when coming down from New Norfolk yesterday, struck on a log lying in the river, and stripped three blades off her propeller, which will necessitate her being slipped.

At around this time the owners of the Koonya decided to remove her from her long-held Hobart-to-Strahan route and place her on the run between Launceston and the west coast. At the time she was described as "a popular boat and will, no doubt, maintain her reputation in her new service" with a pleasant ceremony taking place in the cabin at the time of the final Hobart-to-Strahan run which involved a few of the many friends of Captain Madden, Mr. Thomas Williams, the engineer, and Mr. L. Pridmont, the provider.

In mid-1891 a

sad accident happened at Trial Harbour yesterday morning. The steamer Koonya was leaving the harbour when her boat got adrift. Two lumpers, named Thomas Bowen and William Evans, went to pick up the boat, when their own boat capsized and both men drowned. The bodies have not yet been recovered. Bowen leaves a wife and seven children.

==== Koonya and Pioneer collision ====
On the morning of 16 July 1891 at 6 a.m. the SS Pioneer was coming from the northward and was off the shore at Trial Harbour when a steamer's light appeared, coming from the southward, which turned out to be those of the Koonya. Soon after the Koonya struck the Pioneer, and the Pioneer immediately began to take on water quickly.

Captain MacCallum (of the Pioneer) hailed Captain Madden, of the Koonya, and told him he was in a sinking condition, and asked to be towed into Strahan. This was done, and the Pioneer jettisoned her deck cargo, and a part of that in her hold. While being towed, however, she began to fill very rapidly, and at the request of her captain a boat was sent from the Koonya to stand by. The crew of the Pioneer were eventually taken off, and the vessel sank stern first, about eight miles from Strahan, between 9 a.m. and 10 a.m.

The Pioneer was built in Melbourne, in 1874 for the Westernport trade, and after some service there was placed in the Melbourne and Circular Head trade, and afterwards in the Port Kembla-Sydney trade. Whilst thus employed she was purchased by Captain E. T. Miles for the Tasmanian East Coast trade, and arrived here in April, 1889, under the command of Captain Chaplin. She was built of wood, was 95ft. long, with a beam of 16ft, and a depth of 7ft 0in. Soon after her arrival she was thoroughly overhauled, fitted with new machinery, and practically made a new vessel, upon which she was put in the Hobart-Strahan trade by Messrs. T. A. .Reynolds and Co. She continued in this 'trade until early in April of this year, when .he became the property of Mr. J. S. Lee, of the Duck River, and since that time she has been employed in the West Coast carrying trade. Her registered tonnage was 78 tons, her carrying capacity 120 tons. Captain A. McCallum was her commander. It is sup- posed that the Pioneer is not insured.

At the Marine Court Inquiry it was found That the master of the Koonya, William Madden, was primarily at fault, and the Court ordered the suspension of William Madden's master's certificate for three months, and adjudged him to pay the Nautical Assessor's fee of £3 5s. Captain T. H. Holyman, of the ketch Violet, took command of the SS. Koonya during the suspension of Captain Madden's certificate. The Koonya continued on quietly till her next change of ownership.

=== Moruya Steam Navigation Company and sinking ===
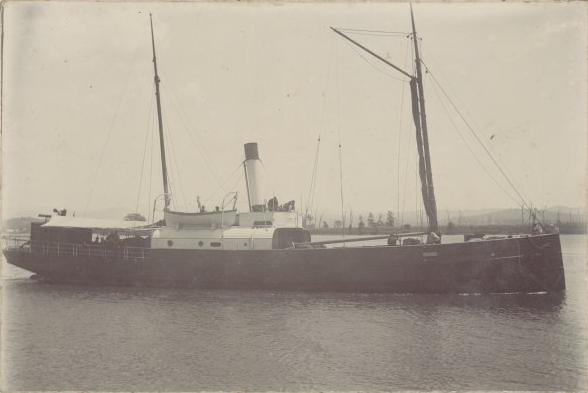
SS Koonya While owned by the Moruya Steam Navigation Co

On Tuesday 12 May 1896 the Steamer Koonya was sold at auction to the Moruya Steam Navigation Company. Koonya was placed into weekly trips between Sydney and Moruya. The vessel had a relatively uneventful life till her shaft broke off near Jervis Bay on 10 June 1897. She was towed into the bay by the steamer Murray during the night. It took approximately a fortnight till the vessel returned to her regular journeys.

When the Kameruka sank in October 1897, the Koonya sailed with the Kameruka's part salvaged cargo aboard, consisting of 25 tons of butter and a large quantity of cheese and cream, all in good condition. The remainder of the cargo from the Kameruka was damaged, and was abandoned.

== Wreck ==
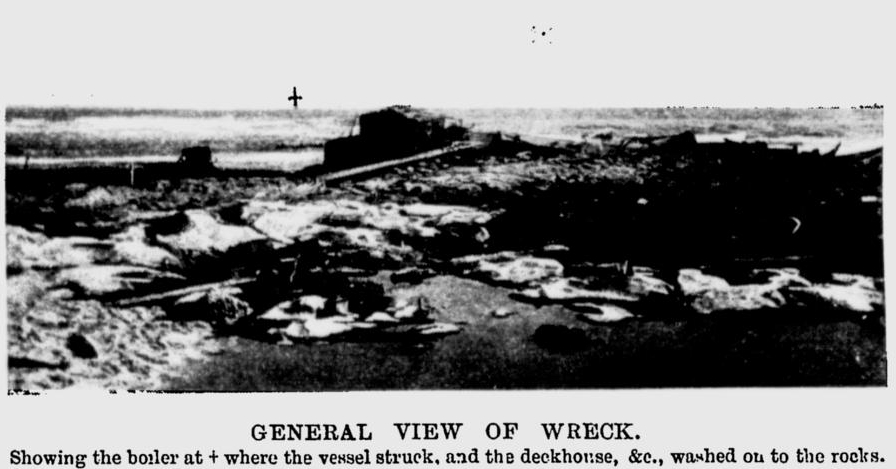
Picture of wreckage of the SS Koonya on the shore

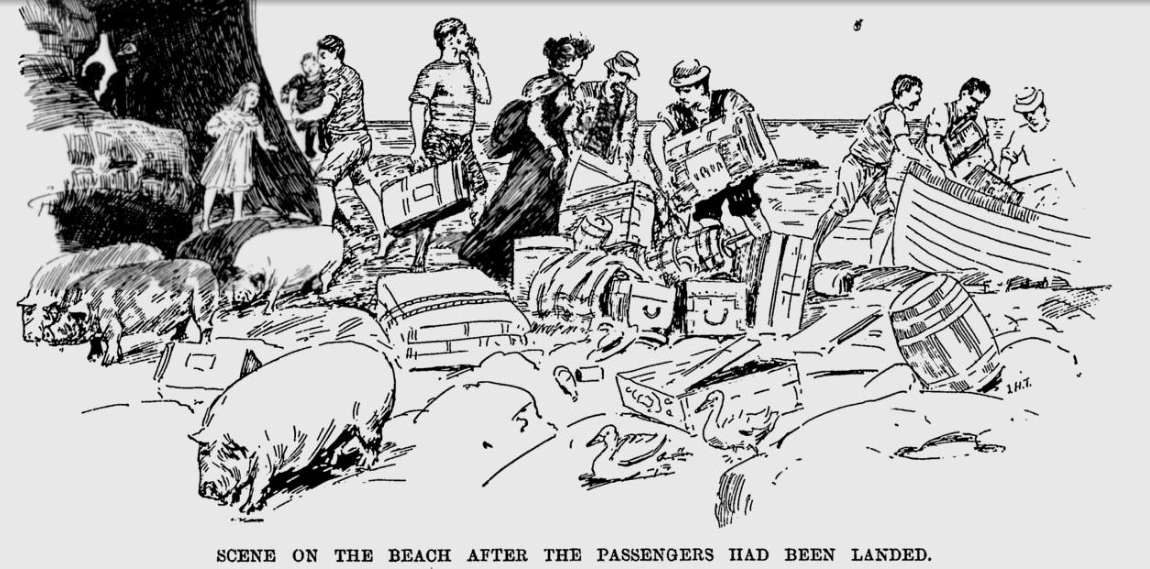
Scene on the beach as the Passengers and Cargo of SS Koonya came ashore

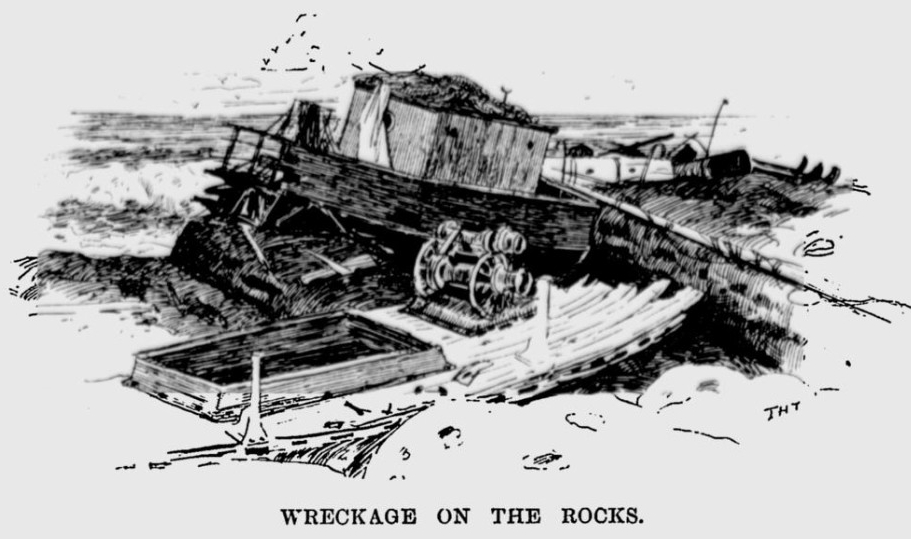
Sketch of the Wreckage from the SS Koonya

Early in the morning of Tuesday 25 January 1898 the smart little coasting steamer Koonya in a thick fog ran aground at the northern end of Cronulla Beach outside Merries Reef onto Doboy reef about three-quarters of a mile from the shore.

The steamer left Moruya at 10 a m on Monday for Sydney, with 14 passengers, amongst whom were a number of ladies and children All was right until about 3 a.m. yesterday, the weather being intensely thick and raining, when the steamer ran ashore on a fungus-growth patch at the northern- most end of Cronulla Beach The land could not be seen, and there is no light there. The captain was on the bridge, it being his watch, he having relieved the mate at midnight .The master is Captain T .Nicholson, and his chief officer Mr F Basclain. Immediately the vessel struck all hands were at once on deck, and the stewardess routed out the ladies and children, and lifebelts were supplied. There was a heavy sea, and the belts were put round the passengers. Soon after the Captain, who behaved coolly, told the people there was no real danger. They might take the belts off, as he could easily land them at daylight. No seas broke aboard the steamer lying on her side in a comparatively sheltered spot.

The women and children all got on the bridge. When daylight came in the boat was launched and took a line ashore. This was made fast to a tree, the vessel being about 50 or 60 yards from the land. By these means all the passengers were got ashore- that is, that the crew worked the boat between the ship and shore by the hand-line thus established, the women and children being landed first, next the male passengers, and afterwards their luggage and the effects of the crew, with the exception of those of the stewardess, which were lost, Miss Rankin being so busy looking after those in her charge that her personal goods were overlooked. The passengers speak in unmeasured terms of praise of Miss Rankin's noble efforts in helping the women and children during the trying time They also have a good word for the master and crew After getting ashore an impromptu camp was put up, in winch the whole party breakfasted, plenty of everything being available by boat from the vessel

Very soon after, however, whether owing to the tide rising and the heavy easterly swell setting in (wind at time of wreck was S E to E), the vessel began to range about, and presently broke in halves, and at high water only a little of her stern could be seen Then the action of the sea soon smashed her up, and wreckage was strewn along the beach Cheese were particularly in evidence, and some 20 pigs out of 25 that were on board were seen gambolling on the beach At this time no person had put in an appearance at the scene, and the captain sent a message into Sutherland, whence it was dispatched to Sydney, asking for conveyances to be sent to take the people to the hotel at Port Hacking In response to this message a conveyance came, and took the party with their effects to the hotel The road is a pretty rough one, so that progress was slow, and the people had to get out and walk at intervals At the hotel all their requirements were attended to The vessel struck the Doboy reef about three-quarters of a mile from the shore the vessel was going at the rate of about eight knots...., and she broke up in a few hours The stern portion of the vessel, with the ladies' cabin intact, was washed up on the rocks to high-water mark, where it remained fast.

The list -Mrs. Jones Miss F Holder, Mrs. Warren and four children, Mrs. Walters and one child, Mrs. Craig, Messrs Cleary, Hopkins, M. Dean, Murphy, W Smith, Master Jeffrevs, Captain Holder

The Cargo 1222 cheese, 100 bags corn, 310 bags bark, 14 bags potatoes, 1 case fish, 12 hides, 3 kegs and 7 boxes butter, 7 boxes eggs, 6 blocks granite, 39 pigs, and sundries

The Koonya was a wooden screw steamer of 119 tons, built 10 years ago in Hobart, and owned by the Moruya Steam Navigation Company She was insured for £2500

Thomas Nicholson, skipper of the Koonya, said that he had been in command of the boat about 13 months, or it might be a little more trading between Sydney, Moruya, Wagonga, and Montague Island The wreck was sold at auction for £50 to Mr. Einerson after having start at a £5 bid

== Wreck Site & Wreckage ==
The vessel struck the Doboy reef about three-quarters of a mile from the shore the steamer ran ashore on a fungus-growth patch at the northernmost end of Cronulla Beach and the crew took a line ashore. This was made fast to a tree, the vessel being about 50 or 60 yards from the land When talking about the grounding of the Marjorie the site was described as

The only inhabitants are a handful of fisher folk, who manage to keep their craft in a little rockbound inlet called Boat Harbour. It is hard by that the Marjorie struck-a mile to the south of the Koonya wreck some years ago. She just missed the main reef In the vicinity-the Doughboy bombora-and managed to run into a narrow and shallow channel in the Merries.

In February 1898 The Sydney Mail had three pictures of the wreck of the Koonya.
