= Jewish resistance =

Jewish resistance may refer to:

- Jewish Resistance Movement, a Jewish underground movement in Mandate Palestine
- Jewish resistance in German-occupied Europe
