= Night of the Trains =

1945 sabotage of railway infrastructure

- Operation Party; Part of Jewish insurgency in Mandatory Palestine
- Type: Sabotage
- Location: Mandatory Palestine
- Planned by: Jewish Resistance Movement
- Target: British railway infrastructure
- Objective: Sabotage British railways
- Date: 1 November 1945; 80 years ago
- Executed by: Palmach, Irgun, Lehi
- Casualties: 1 Irgun fighter, 1 Lehi member, 2 British, 4 Arabs killed

The Night of the Trains (or Operation Party) was a sabotage operation of the British railways in Palestine ("Palestine Railways") on November 1, 1945. The operation was one of the first carried out by the Jewish Resistance Movement, before its official establishment, and symbolized its founding.

== Operation ==
During the operation Palmach units sabotaged a network of railways around the country and blew up three British guard boats in Jaffa port and in Haifa, and a combined Irgun–Lehi unit attacked Lydda railway station, which is the key junction between the Haifa – El Kantara main line and the Jaffa–Jerusalem railway. An estimated 1,000 men were involved in the operations.

Approximately fifty Palmach units, which included sappers and guard, severely damaged 153 points along the railway system in Mandate Palestine, primarily at railway junctions and bridges above them. The operations took place around 11:00 p.m., fully synchronized in order to prevent a British response. Shootings occurred in two places with no casualties. Over 242 breaks in the railway lines were made, and a stationmaster's office, telephone installation, and petrol wagon were bombed.

At the same time, the Palmach's marine unit, the Palyam, sank three British guard boats, two in Haifa and one in Jaffa. These boats were part of the closure imposed on the shores in order to prevent Jewish immigration. In Haifa Yohai Ben-Nun led the operation and in Jaffa, Yossi Harel and Zalman Cohen did, after a briefing by Yitzhak Sadeh. In both cases the sappers arrived in boats, dived under the British boats, and attached explosives with a delay mechanism to the boats.

That same night an Irgun unit, led by Eitan Livni, raided a train station in Lod. During exchanges of fire, the fighters destroyed one train engine and damaged six others. During the raid, an Irgun fighter, two British people (one soldier and one policeman), and four Arabs were killed. The operation took a relatively heavy toll, most likely because the raiding team was late in arriving at the target, meaning that British officials were already on high alert. A Lehi unit launched a sabotage operation against the oil refinery in Haifa, but the explosives detonated prematurely as they were being carried, and as a result the Lehi member carrying them was killed. Severe damage was caused to the facility, but the oil tanks, which were the intended target, were left untouched.

A subsequent confrontation at Ramat Hakovesh lead to the area becoming a "No Go" area for British forces. Two weeks later the District Office in Tel Aviv was set on fire and in the riots that followed, involving 3rd Battalion, The Parachute Regiment, six Jews were killed.

== Aftermath ==
The operation raised morale in the Yishuv, after the heavy restrictions by the British on Aliyah and settlement. The operation mostly created satisfaction within the Yishuv leadership and Palmach and Haganah members that saw that they were able to simultaneously operate a large number of units in a large number of locations. David Ben-Gurion wrote to the leadership of the Haganah that this operation has its rewards—though they may not be immediate. The response in Britain was great as well. Government officials condemned the operation and the press published detailed articles about the sabotage actions.

== Bibliography ==
- The Palmach—Its Warriors and Operation, Uri Brener, special edition for Palmach national convention, 1978
- Palmach: Plugot Hamahatz shel Hahaganah, 1941–1949 Meir Pa'il, Avraham Zohar and Azriel Ronen (Hebrew)
