= Jewish insurgency in Mandatory Palestine =

1944–1948 paramilitary terror campaign

- Part of the intercommunal conflict in Mandatory Palestine
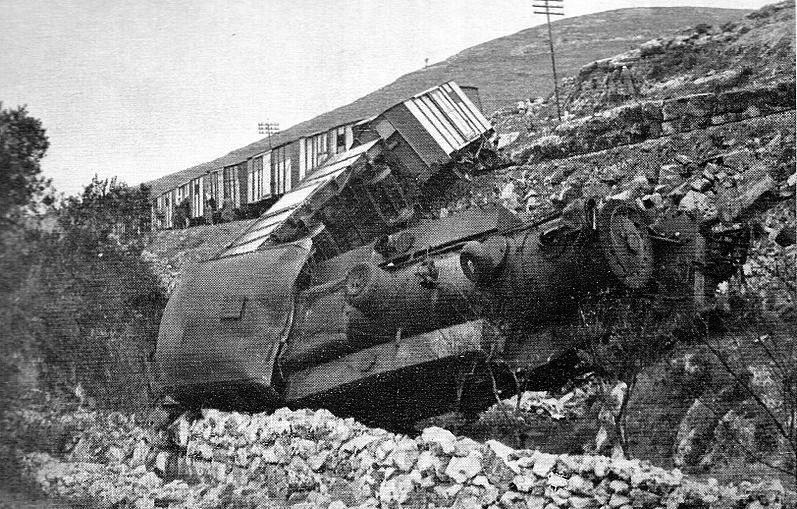
- Palestine Railway K class 2-8-4T steam locomotive and freight train derailed from the Jaffa and Jerusalem line after being sabotaged by Jewish insurgents in 1946
| Date | 1 February 1944 – 14 May 1948 (4 years, 3 months, 1 week and 6 days) |
| Location | Mandatory Palestine |
| Result | Zionist victory; British forces unable to suppress insurgency; Insurgency turned British public opinion against the deployment in Palestine, leading to Britain deferring the issue to the United Nations; 29 November 1947: UN Partition Plan passes and the civil war in Mandatory Palestine begins |

Belligerents
| United Kingdom; (United Kingdom) British Army; (United Kingdom) Royal Navy; (United Kingdom) Royal Air Force; (United Kingdom) Royal Marines; Palestine Police Force | Jewish National Council; Irgun (1944–48); Lehi (1944–48); Haganah (1945–46); Palmach; Hish; Him |

Commanders and leaders
| Sir Evelyn Barker; Sir Alan Cunningham; Harold MacMichael; Sir Gordon MacMillan; John Vereker, 6th Viscount Gort; John Rymer-Jones; William Nicol Gray | Menachem Begin; Amichai Paglin; Yitzhak Shamir; Eitan Livni; Nathan Yellin-Mor; Moshe Sneh; Yisrael Galili |

Strength
| British Police: 4,000 policemen British Armed Forces: 100,000 troops (peak strength) | Haganah: 21,000 troops; Palmach: 3,000 troops; Irgun: 4,000 troops Lehi: 500 troops |

Casualties and losses
| 141 killed 475 wounded (August 1945 – August 1947) | ~40 killed, executed, or committed suicide (August 1945 – August 1947) |

In the final years of the British Mandate for Palestine (1944–48), tensions between the British authorities and the Zionist movement escalated into an armed insurgency. Zionist militias and underground groups—including Haganah, Lehi, and Irgun—carried out a paramilitary campaign against British rule in Mandatory Palestine. The tensions between the Zionist underground and the British mandatory authorities rose from 1938 and intensified with the publication of the White Paper of 1939. The Paper outlined new government policies to place further restrictions on Jewish immigration and land purchases, and declared the intention of giving independence to Palestine, with an Arab majority, within ten years. Though World War II brought relative calm, tensions again escalated into an armed struggle towards the end of the war, when it became clear that the Axis powers were close to defeat.

The Haganah, the largest of the Jewish underground militias, which was under the control of the officially recognised Jewish leadership of Palestine, remained cooperative with the British. But in 1944 the Irgun, an offshoot of the Haganah, launched a rebellion against British rule, thus joining Lehi, which had been active against the authorities throughout the war. Both were small, dissident militias of the right-wing Revisionist movement. They carried out attacks against British military, police, and administrative targets, driven in part by opposition to British restrictions on Jewish immigration under the White Paper and limits on Jewish land purchase.

The armed conflict escalated during the final phase of World War II, when the Irgun declared a revolt in February 1944, ending the hiatus in operations it had begun in 1940. Starting from the assassination of Baron Moyne by Lehi in 1944, the Haganah actively opposed the Irgun and Lehi, in a period of inter-Jewish fighting known as the Hunting Season (The Saison), effectively halting the insurrection. However, in autumn 1945, following the end of World War II in both Europe (April–May 1945) and Asia (September 1945), when it became clear that the British would not permit significant Jewish immigration and had no intention of immediately establishing a Jewish state, the Haganah began a period of co-operation with the other two underground organisations. They jointly formed the Jewish Resistance Movement. The Haganah refrained from direct confrontation with British forces, and concentrated its efforts on attacking British immigration control, while Irgun and Lehi attacked military and police targets. The Resistance Movement dissolved amidst recriminations in July 1946, following the King David Hotel bombing. The Irgun and Lehi started acting independently, while the main underground militia, Haganah, continued acting mainly in supporting Jewish immigration. The Haganah again briefly worked to suppress Irgun and Lehi operations, due to the presence of a United Nations investigative committee in Palestine. After the UN Partition Plan resolution was passed on 29 November 1947, the civil war between Palestinian Jews and Arabs eclipsed the previous tensions of both with the British. However, British and Zionist forces continued to clash throughout the period of the civil war up to the termination of the British Mandate for Palestine and the Israeli Declaration of Independence on 14 May 1948.

Within the United Kingdom, there were deep divisions over the war in Palestine. Dozens of British soldiers, Jewish militants, and civilians died during the campaigns of insurgency. The conflict led to heightened antisemitism in the United Kingdom. In August 1947, after the hanging of two abducted British sergeants by the Irgun, there was widespread anti-Jewish rioting across the United Kingdom. The conflict also caused tensions in Anglo-American relations.

== Background ==
=== Between the World Wars ===
Although both the 1917 Balfour Declaration and the terms of the League of Nations British Mandate of Palestine called for a national home for the Jewish people in Palestine, the British did not accept any linkage between Palestine and the situation of European Jews. After the Nuremberg Laws of 1935 many German Jews sought refuge abroad, and by the end of 1939 some 80,000 had been given refuge in Great Britain itself.

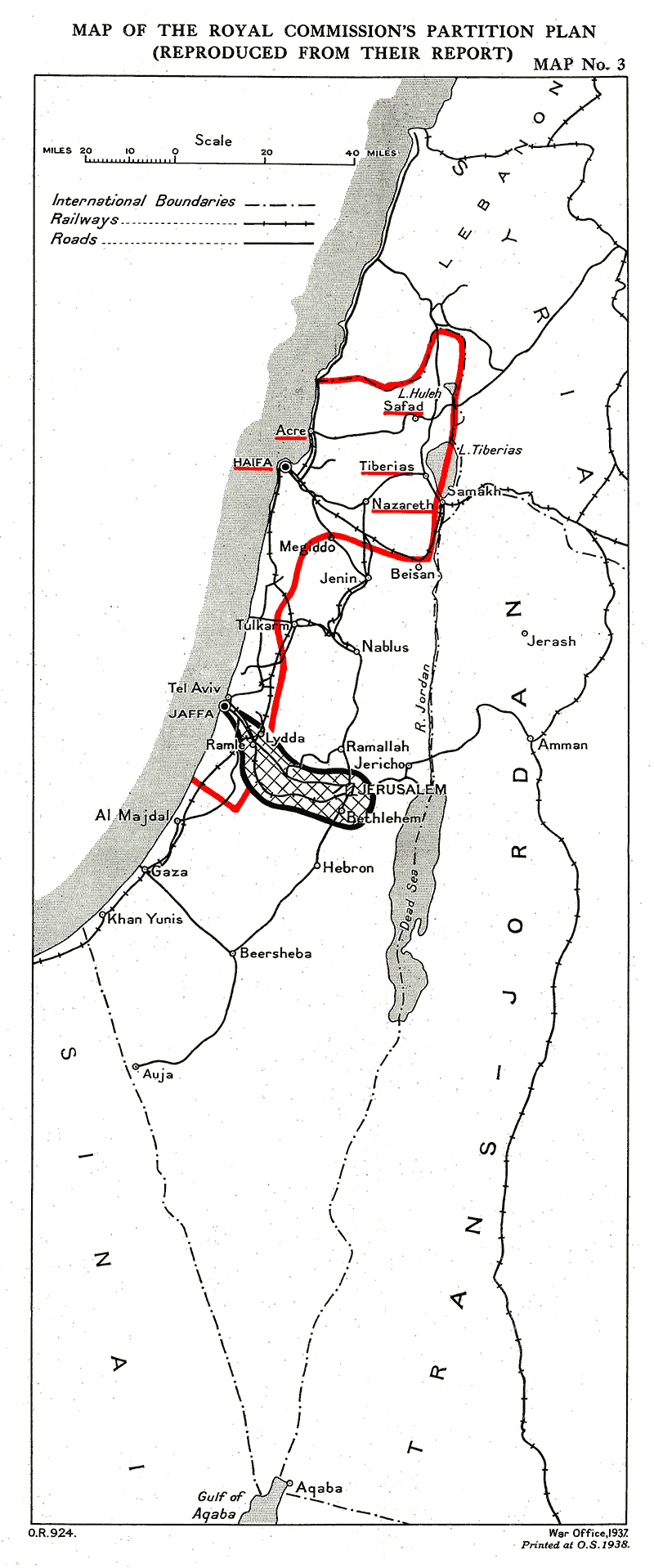
Peel Commission Partition Plan, July 1937

In 1936–37, soon after the start of the Arab uprising in Palestine, Earl Peel led a commission to consider a solution. The Peel Commission proposed a partition of Palestine that involved the compulsory resettlement of some Arab and Jewish inhabitants. It was not acceptable either to the Arab or to the Jewish leaders, though David Ben-Gurion remarked in 1937, "The compulsory transfer of the Arabs from the valleys of the proposed Jewish state could give us something which we have never had, even when we stood on our own during the days of the First and Second Temples." The twentieth Zionist Congress resolved in August 1937 that: "the partition plan proposed by the Peel Commission is not to be accepted"; but it wished "to carry on negotiations in order to clarify the exact substance of the British government's proposal for the foundation of a Jewish state in Palestine".

A further attempt was made in the Woodhead Commission, also known as the "Palestine Partition Commission", whose report was published in late 1938. A government statement (Cmnd 5843) followed on 11 November 1938. It concluded that: "His Majesty's Government, after careful study of the Partition Commission's report, have reached the conclusion that this further examination has shown that the political, administrative and financial difficulties involved in the proposal to create independent Arab and Jewish States inside Palestine are so great that this solution of the problem is impracticable." The brief St. James Conference followed in early 1939.

Britain also attended the international Évian Conference in 1938 on the issue of providing for refugees from Germany. Palestine was not discussed as a refuge because it might worsen the ongoing Arab revolt; Zionists naturally hoped that Palestine would be the principal destination for all such refugees.

=== British immigration restrictions and the 1939 White Paper ===
In the 1920s, the British imposed restrictions on Jewish immigration to Palestine and the ability of Jews to buy land, claiming that these decisions were taken due to concerns over the economic absorptive capacity of the country. In the 1930s, British authorities set a quota for immigration certificates and authorised the Jewish Agency to hand them out at its discretion. Shortly before the outbreak of World War II, the British introduced the White Paper of 1939. The White Paper rejected the concept of partition of Palestine into Jewish and Arab states and announced that the country would be turned into an independent binational state with an Arab majority. It severely curtailed Jewish immigration, allowing for only 75,000 Jews to migrate to Palestine from 1940 to 1944, consisting of a yearly quota of 10,000 per year and a supplementary quota for 25,000 to cover refugee emergencies spread out over the same period. Afterward, further Jewish immigration would depend on the consent of the Arab majority. Sales of Arab land to Jews were to be restricted.

In reaction to British restrictions, illegal immigration to Palestine began. Initially, Jews entered Palestine by land, mainly by slipping across the northern border, where they were aided by the border settlements. In the early 1930s, when crossing the northern border became more difficult, other routes were found. Thousands of Jews came to Palestine on student or tourist visas, and never returned to their countries of origin. Jewish women often entered into fictitious marriages with residents of Palestine to be granted entry for family reunification purposes. In 1934, the first seaborne attempt to bring Jews to Palestine happened when some 350 Jews of the HeHalutz movement in Poland who were unwilling to wait for certificates sailed to Palestine on the Vallos, a chartered ship. Two more ships carrying illegal immigrants arrived in 1937, and several more arrived in 1938 and 1939. These voyages were mainly organised by the Revisionist Zionist Organisation and the Irgun. Until 1938, the Jewish Agency opposed illegal immigration, fearing that it would impact the number of immigration certificates issued.

Overall, between 1929 and 1940, a period of mass Jewish immigration known as the Fifth Aliyah occurred despite British restrictions. Nearly 250,000 Jews (of whom 20,000 later left) immigrated to Palestine, many of them illegally.

=== During World War II (1939–1944) ===
The Second World War erupted when Mandatory authorities of Palestine were at the final stages of subduing the armed Arab revolt of 1936–1939. All Jewish organisations, including the Zionists in Europe also played a major role in the Jewish resistance to the Nazis in Europe, automatically allied with the Allied forces, including the British.

The Yishuv temporarily put aside its differences with the British regarding the White Paper, deciding that defeating the Nazis was a more urgent goal. The leader of Palestine's Jews, David Ben-Gurion, issued a call for Jews to "support the British as if there is no White Paper and oppose the White Paper as if there is no war". During the war, Palestinian Jews volunteered in large numbers to serve in the British Army, serving mainly in North Africa. Of the 470,000 Jews in Palestine at the time, some 30,000 served in the British Army during the war. There was a Jewish battalion attached to the British Army's 1st Battalion, Royal East Kent Regiment stationed in Palestine.

With the decline of the Arab Revolt by September 1939, the tensions among Jews and Arabs eased as well. During the war, among the Palestinian Arabs, the Nashashibi clan supported the British, while another Arab Palestinian faction, led by exiled Amin al-Husseini, supported the Axis powers. Haj Amin al-Husseini became the most prominent Arab collaborator with the Axis powers.

The Palestine Regiment was formed in 1942, combining three Jewish and one Arab battalions, reaching altogether 3,800 volunteers. It was involved in activities at the Mediterranean scene of the war, sustaining casualties during the North African Campaign. The Special Interrogation Group was also formed in 1942 as a commando unit composed of German-speaking Palestinian Jews. It performed commando and sabotage operations during the Western Desert Campaign.

The Jewish underground group Irgun ceased all anti-British activities by September 1939, and supported the British. An Irgun unit was sent to assist British forces fighting in the Middle East. In 1941, Irgun's David Raziel was killed while fighting in the Kingdom of Iraq with the British against that country's pro-Axis regime. Irgun also provided the British with intelligence from Eastern Europe and North Africa and allowed members to enlist in the British Army.

However, in August 1940, Irgun member Avraham Stern formed Lehi, a breakaway group which favoured armed struggle against the British to force them out of Palestine and immediately establish a Jewish state. Stern was unaware of the Nazis' intent to exterminate the Jews and believed that Hitler wanted to make Germany judenrein through emigration. Stern proposed an alliance with Nazi Germany, offering the Germans help in conquering the Middle East and driving out the British in exchange for the establishment of a Jewish state in Palestine, which would then take in European Jewry. This proposal, which never received a reply, cost Lehi and Stern much support. Stern became a pariah among the Jews in Palestine, and was himself killed by British police in 1942.

During the war, a special paratrooper unit in the British Army composed of Jewish men and women from Palestine was active. The unit's members were sent into occupied Europe, mainly by airdrop, to help organise and participate in local resistance activities on the ground. Some 250 men and women volunteered, of whom 110 underwent training and 37 were infiltrated.

In December 1942, when the mass murder of European Jewry became known to the Allies, the British continued to refuse to change their policy of limited immigration, or to admit Jews from Nazi controlled Europe in numbers outside the quota imposed by the White Paper, and the Royal Navy prevented ships with Jewish refugees from reaching Palestine. Some ships carrying Jewish refugees were turned back towards Europe, although in one instance, about 2,000 Jews who were fleeing Europe by sea were detained in a camp in Mauritius and were given the option of emigrating to Palestine after the war. The British also stopped all attempts by Palestinian Jews to bribe the Nazis into freeing European Jews. At the time that the Holocaust became known to the Allies, there were 34,000 Jewish immigration certificates for Palestine remaining. In 1943, about half the remaining certificates were distributed, and by the end of the war, 3,000 certificates remained.

In September 1944, the Jewish Brigade was formed, based on the Palestine Regiment core. The brigade consisted of nearly 5,000 volunteers, including three former Palestine Regiment battalions, the 200th Field Regiment, Royal Artillery and several supporting units. The brigade was dispatched to participate in the Italian campaign in late 1944 and later took part in the Spring 1945 offensive in Italy against the German forces.

== History ==
=== British restrictions on Jewish immigration ===
During the 1945 British election, Labour pledged that if they returned to power, they would revoke the White Paper of 1939, permit free Jewish immigration to Palestine and turn Palestine into a Jewish national home that would gradually evolve into an independent state. Labour Chancellor Hugh Dalton issued a statement calling for the population transfer of Arabs and even examining the possibility of further expanding the borders of a future Jewish state. However, the new Labour Foreign Secretary, Ernest Bevin, decided to maintain heavy restrictions on Jewish immigration. Bevin favoured the White Paper's policy of turning Palestine into an Arab state with a Jewish minority that would have political and economic rights. He feared that the creation of a Jewish state would inflame Arab opinion and jeopardise Britain's position as the dominant power in the Middle East. Bevin also believed that most displaced Holocaust survivors should be resettled in Europe instead of Palestine.

Due to the British immigration restrictions, the Jewish Agency Executive turned to illegal immigration. Over the next few years tens of thousands of Jews sailed towards Palestine in overcrowded vessels in a program known as Aliyah Bet, despite the almost certain knowledge that it would lead to incarceration in a British prison camp (most ships were intercepted). The overwhelming majority were European Jews, including many Holocaust survivors, although some North African Jews were also involved.

In Europe former Jewish partisans led by Abba Kovner began to organise escape routes taking Jews from Eastern Europe down to the Mediterranean where the Jewish Agency organised ships to illegally carry them to Palestine. British officials in the occupied German zones tried to halt Jewish immigration by refusing to recognise the Jews as a national group and demanding that they return to their places of origin. The British government put diplomatic pressure on Poland, the source of a large number of the Jewish refugees, to clamp down on Jewish emigration, as Poland freely permitted Jews to leave without visas or exit permits, but their efforts proved futile. The Polish government supported the emigration since it allowed them to avoid the responsibility of having to deal with property claims from Polish Jews who were returning home, only to find their property now in the hands of others. In 1947, British Secret Intelligence Service (MI6) launched Operation Embarrass, a clandestine operation to blow up empty ships in Italian ports that were preparing to take Jewish refugees to Palestine, by having operatives attach limpet mines to the hulls of vessels. From summer 1947 to early 1948, five such attacks were carried out, destroying one ship and damaging two others. Two other British mines were discovered before they detonated. A report stated that "only 1 out of some 30 ships carrying illegal immigrants reached their destination."

In the early stages of illegal immigration, small coastal craft were used to bring in Jewish refugees, but large vessels were soon used. In total, some 60 ships were employed, including 10 ships acquired as war surplus from US boneyards. Among the crews were Jewish American and Canadian volunteers. In order to prevent Jewish illegal migrants reaching Palestine a naval blockade was established to stop boats carrying illegal migrants, and there was extensive intelligence gathering and diplomatic pressure on countries through which the migrants were passing or from whose ports the ships were coming. When an illegal immigrant ship was spotted, it would be approached by warships, and would often maneuver violently to avoid being boarded. British boarding parties consisting of Royal Marines and paratroopers would then be sent to take control of the ship. On 27 ships, they were met with some level of resistance, including 13 cases of violent resistance, during which boarding parties were opposed by passengers armed with weapons such as clubs, iron bars, axes, firebombs, scalding steam hoses, and pistols. Royal Navy ships would ram transports, and boarding parties forced their way onto the ships and engaged in close-quarters hand-to-hand fighting to gain control. In five instances, firearms were used. During these encounters, two Royal Navy warships were damaged in collisions with immigrant ships. Seven British soldiers were killed during battles to take control of immigrant ships – most of whom drowned after being pushed overboard by passengers. Six passengers were also killed. From 1945 to 1948, some 80,000 illegal immigrants attempted to enter Palestine. About 49 illegal immigrant ships were captured and 66,000 people were detained. Some 1,600 others drowned at sea.

In 1945, the Atlit detainee camp was reopened. The camp had been built in the 1930s to hold illegal Jewish immigrants fleeing Europe, and during World War II it had been used to hold Jewish refugees fleeing the Holocaust, who were often held for an extended period of time before being released. As more and more illegals began arriving in Palestine, the camp was reopened. In October 1945, a raid by the Palmach freed 208 inmates. One week after the King David hotel bombing in July 1946, four ships carrying 6,000 illegal immigrants arrived in Haifa, completely overflowing the Atlit camp. The British government, which had known for some time that it would be unable to contain Jewish immigration, established internment camps on the island of Cyprus to detain all illegal immigrants. About 53,000 Jews, mostly Holocaust survivors, passed through these holding facilities.

British officials in the liberated zones tried to halt Jewish immigration, and did not recognise the Jews as a national group, demanding that they return to their places of origin. Jewish concentration camp survivors (displaced persons or DPs) were forced to share accommodation with non-Jewish DPs some of whom were former Nazi collaborators, now seeking asylum. In some cases former Nazis were given positions of authority in the camps, which they used to abuse the Jewish survivors. Food supplies to Jewish concentration camp survivors in the British zone were cut to prevent them from assisting Jews fleeing Eastern Europe. In the British zone they were refused support on the grounds that they were not displaced by the war.

Troops in the U.S. zone were also not helping survivors but in 1945, U.S. President Harry S. Truman sent a personal representative, Earl G. Harrison, to investigate the situation of the Jewish survivors in Europe. Harrison reported,

[S]ubstantial unofficial and unauthorized movements of people must be expected, and these will require considerable force to prevent, for the patience of many of the persons involved is, and in my opinion with justification, nearing the breaking point. It cannot be overemphasized that many of these people are now desperate, that they have become accustomed under German rule to employ every possible means to reach their end, and that the fear of death does not restrain them.

The Harrison report changed U.S. policy in the occupied zones, and U.S. policy increasingly focused on helping Jews escape Eastern Europe. Jews escaping post-war anti-Semitic attacks in Eastern Europe learned to avoid the British zone and generally moved through American zones.

In April 1946, the Anglo-American Committee of Enquiry reported that given a chance, half a million Jews would immigrate to Palestine:

In Poland, Hungary and Rumania, the chief desire is to get out. ... The vast majority of the Jewish displaced persons and migrants, however, believe that the only place which offers a prospect is Palestine."

A survey of Jewish DPs found 96.8% would choose Palestine. In reality less wanted to go to Palestine but DP's responded to Zionist requests that they write Palestine.

The Anglo-American Committee recommended that 100,000 Jews be immediately admitted into Palestine. U.S. President Truman pressured the British to accede to this demand. Despite British government promises to abide by the committee's decision, the British decided to persist with restrictions on Jewish migration. Foreign Secretary Bevin remarked that the American pressure to admit 100,000 Jews into Palestine was because "they do not want too many of them in New York". Prime Minister Clement Attlee announced that 100,000 Jews would not be permitted into Palestine long as the "illegal armies" of Palestine (meaning the Jewish militias) were not disbanded.

In October 1946, in fulfillment of the recommendation of the Anglo-American Committee, Britain decided to allow a further 96,000 Jews into Palestine at a rate of 1,500 a month. Half this monthly quota was allocated to Jews in the prisons on Cyprus, due to fears that if the number of Jewish prisoners in the Cyprus camps kept growing, it would eventually lead to an uprising there.

On July 18, 1947, the Royal Navy intercepted the Exodus 1947 a ship laden with 4,515 refugees en route to Palestine. The passengers resisted violently, and the boarding ended with two passengers and one crewman dead. Bevin decided that rather than being sent to Cyprus, the immigrants on board the Exodus would be returned to the ship's port of origin in France. Bevin believed that sending illegal immigrants to Cyprus, where they then qualified for inclusion into legal immigration quotas to Palestine, only encouraged more illegal immigration. By forcing them to return to their port of origin, Bevin hoped to deter future illegal immigrants. However, the French government announced that it would not permit the disembarkation of passengers unless it was voluntary on their part. The passengers refused to disembark, spending weeks in difficult conditions. The ship was then taken to Germany, where the passengers were forcibly removed at Hamburg and returned to DP camps. The event became a major media event, influencing UN deliberations, damaging Britain's international image and prestige, and exacerbating the already poor relationship between Britain and the Jews.

=== The insurgency begins ===
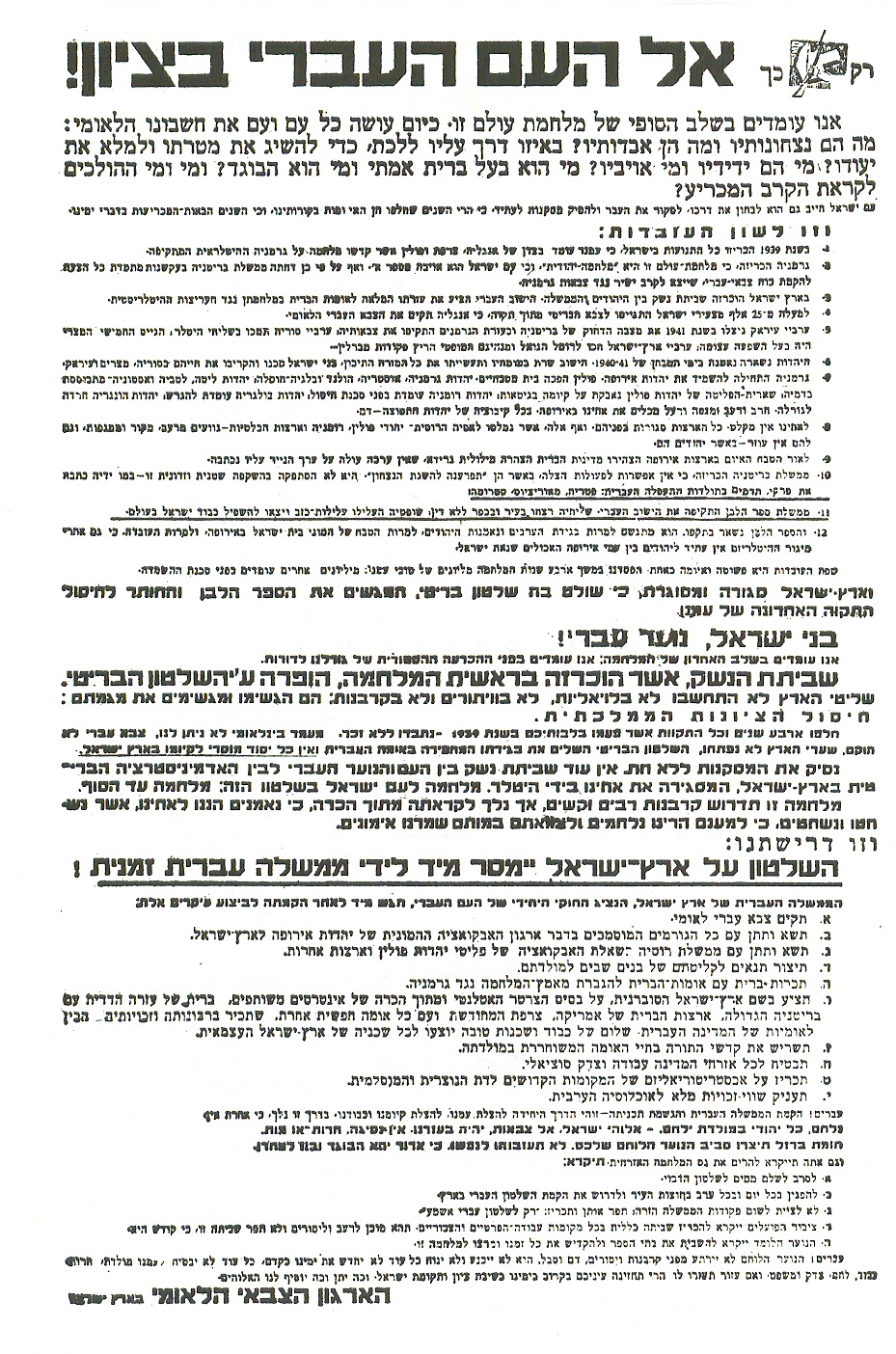
Irgun's declaration of revolt, February 1, 1944

There is a general agreement among historians that the Jewish underground in Palestine refrained from an opened struggle against Britain, as long as the joint enemy of Germany was still at large. This approach changed towards the beginning of 1944, with withdrawal of Axis forces from the Mediterranean and the advances of the Red Army in Eastern Front. With the general feeling that the Axis forces in Europe were nearing their defeat, the Irgun decided to shift its policy from cease-fire to an active campaign of violence, as long as it would not be hurting the war effort against Nazi Germany.

In the autumn of 1943, the Irgun approached Lehi and proposed jointly carrying out an insurrection. The Irgun was now led by Menachem Begin, who had headed Betar in Poland before arriving in Palestine with the Polish forces in exile and going underground. Begin believed that the only way to save European Jewry was to compel the British to leave Palestine as fast as possible and open the country to unrestricted Jewish immigration. He devised a new strategy designed to pressure the British, proposing a series of spectacular underground operations that would humiliate the British and cause them to respond with repressive measures that would antagonise the Yishuv, alienate Britain's allies, and cause controversy among the British public. Begin believed that the insurgency would turn Palestine into a "glass house" with the world's attention focused on it, and that the British, faced with a choice between continued repression or withdrawal, would in the end choose to withdraw. So as not to harm the continuing war effort against Nazi Germany, Begin decided to hold off on attacking British military targets until Germany was defeated.

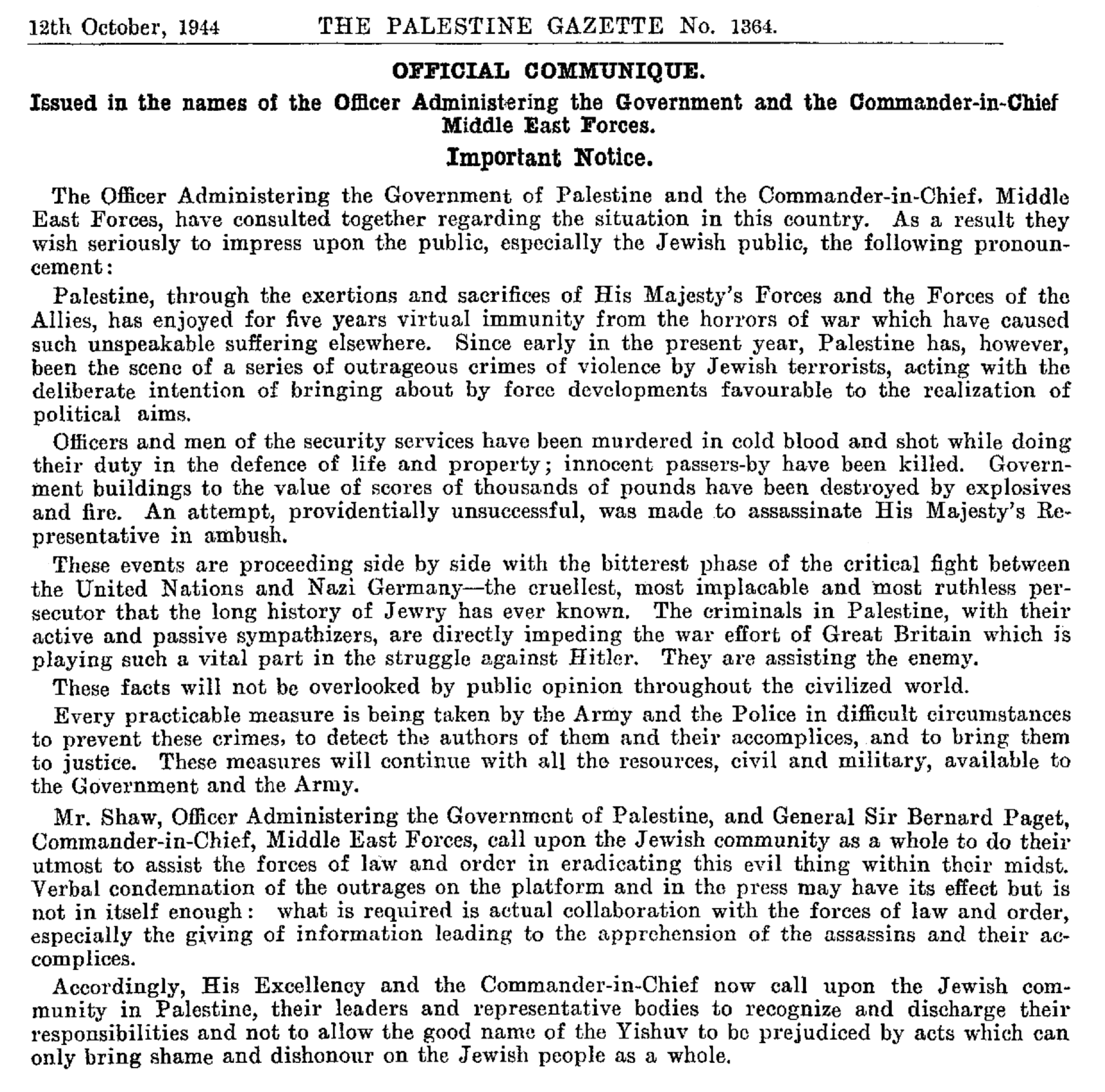
Britain condemns Jewish terrorism during the war

On 1 February 1944, the Irgun declared a revolt against British rule, declaring that "there is no longer any armistice between the Jewish people and the British Administration in Eretz Israel which hands our brothers over to Hitler", and demanding the immediate transfer of power to a provisional Jewish government. On February 12, the Irgun bombed the immigration offices in Jerusalem, Tel Aviv, and Haifa. Two days later, two British constables were shot dead by Lehi members after stumbling on them pasting up posters and attempting to arrest them. On February 27, the Irgun bombed the income taxes offices in Jerusalem, Tel Aviv, and Haifa. On March 13, a Jewish police officer was killed by Lehi in Ramat Gan. Six days later, a Lehi member was shot and killed by police. With Lehi squads sent out to kill police in retribution, the British security forces remained in their stations. On March 23, Lehi members shot and killed two British constables and wounded a third in Jaffa. That same day, the Irgun attacked the police's Criminal Investigation Department (CID) stations in Jerusalem, Jaffa and Haifa. Six British police officers and two Irgun fighters were killed, and the CID stations in Haifa and Jaffa were successfully bombed. Three days later, the British reacted by imposing curfews on Jerusalem, Tel Aviv, and Haifa, and ran identity parades. On April 1, another Jewish constable was killed and a British constable wounded in a Lehi shooting attack. On April 5, Lehi commander Mattityahu Shmulevitz was arrested, but managed to shoot and wound one of the arresting officers.

The rebellion caused growing alarm within the Jewish Agency, which saw the revolt as a challenge to its own authority as the legitimate democratic leadership of the Yishuv, and as a gamble with the future of the Yishuv. On April 2, 1944, the Jewish Agency approved a program of opposition under which efforts would be made to stop "extortion and terror", anti-dissident propaganda would be increased, and attempts would be made to isolate the Irgun and Lehi. In practice, propaganda was increased and assistance was offered to Jews whose contributions had been extorted, but the Jewish Agency failed to take serious measures. However, it did share intelligence with the authorities. On April 6, police acting on intelligence provided by the Jewish Agency surrounded a Lehi safehouse in Yavne'el and raked it with machine gun fire, mortally wounding one Lehi member while the remaining two shot themselves rather than surrender. Haganah intelligence had operated against the Irgun and Lehi since February but had so far failed to stop their activities. On May 17, the Irgun raided and successfully occupied the central broadcasting station in Ramallah, but the plan to transmit an Irgun broadcast from the station failed after the radioman could not work the equipment.

The British responded to the attacks by instituting searches and snap roadblocks, which became routine in Palestine. Between April 1 and May 6, the security forces arrested 81 suspects, including Aryeh Ben-Eliezer, a member of the Irgun high command, who was arrested on April 17. In spite of this, the underground organisations continued their operations. On July 14, the Irgun bombed the Land Registry Office in Jerusalem, killing two Arab constables, and the following day an explosives truck was seized and a British constable killed in another Irgun attack.

On August 8, 1944, Lehi ambushed the car of British High Commissioner Harold MacMichael in an attempt to assassinate him. Although two others in the car were wounded, MacMichael escaped serious injury. The authorities subsequently imposed a collective fine of £500 on the nearby Jewish settlement of Givat Shaul over the assassination attempt. On August 23, the Irgun mounted arms raids on the CID barracks at Jaffa, Abu Kabir, and Neve Sha'anan, seizing fourteen rifles. The British Army mounted its first cordon and search operation in Palestine on September 5 in Petah Tikva, which was known as an insurgent hotbed. The British arrested 46 people in the operation but failed to find Menachem Begin, who was hiding in Petah Tikva under an assumed name, after failing to search the area where he was hiding. Begin subsequently moved to Tel Aviv.

In response to a British ban on the blowing of the Shofar at the Western Wall that had been imposed in 1930 for public security reasons to avoid a violent Arab reaction, the Irgun devised an operation designed to force the British to back down. The Irgun publicly threatened a violent reaction if on September 27, the Yom Kippur holiday, the police attempted to stop the blowing of the shofar. The Irgun in fact had no intention of shooting in the midst of a large Jewish crowd at the Western Wall, but planned a series of attacks on four police Tegart fortresses. If the British would withdraw in the face of the Irgun threat, the attacks would seem unconnected to the threats of violence at the Western Wall, and if they defied the Irgun and attempted to stop the blowing of the shofar, the attacks on the fortresses would be the Irgun's response. On September 27, the authorities allowed the shofar to be blown at the Western Wall. This represented a major psychological victory for the Irgun, which had successfully coerced a major concession from the British authorities which damaged their credibility. On the same night, the Irgun attacked the fortresses. The attacks on the fortresses at Haifa, Beit Dagon, and Qalqilya failed after collapsing into firefights with the security forces. One Irgun fighter was wounded in the attack in Haifa and another four in the raid in Qalqilya. The raid on the fortress at Katra was successful. The Irgun attackers broke into the station and killed two British soldiers and two police constables, then made off with the arms and ammunition. Two days later, Assistant Superintendent Tom Wilkin of the Palestine Police was assassinated by Lehi.

In October 1944, the Jewish Agency decided to take action to suppress the insurrection, and the Haganah opened a training course for 170 men to wage an anti-Irgun campaign which would come to be known as the Saison, or "Hunting Season", on October 20. Meanwhile, the British continued to make arrests, with 118 Irgun suspects detained in the previous two months. On October 21, the British deported 251 Irgun and Lehi suspects in custody to internment camps in Africa, a practice which was to continue up to 1947. Although the Jewish Agency publicly protested, it continued to plan the Saison.

On November 6, 1944, Lehi assassinated Lord Moyne, the British Minister of State in the Middle East, in front of his home in Cairo. His British Army chauffeur was also killed in the incident. The two Lehi gunmen responsible were subsequently arrested, tried, and executed by the Egyptian authorities. The Jewish authorities sharply condemned the assassination.

Jewish Agency and Lehi leaders met in secret before the Saison began. While the exact contents of the meeting were disputed by both sides, it is known that Lehi suspended its activities for six months, and the Saison was not extended to Lehi. In two secret Haganah-Irgun meetings, the Irgun refused Haganah demands to suspend activities against the British and Begin was unconvinced by the Haganah's insistence that Britain would take action to form a Jewish state after the war. At the end of the last meeting, Haganah leader Eliyahu Golomb told Menachem Begin "We shall step in and finish you."

=== The Hunting Season period ===
In November 1944, the Haganah launched the Saison. Haganah men from the Palmach and SHAI abducted Irgun members to hand over the British. The Haganah and Jewish Agency also passed extensive intelligence on the Irgun to the British authorities, who were able to make numerous arrests and discover Irgun safehouses and arms caches. More than 1,000 Irgun members were handed over to the British by the Haganah during the Saison. The Haganah established secret prisons in kibbutzim where it held and interrogated Irgun men it had captured. The Haganah tortured Irgun men in its captivity to gain information. The Saison effectively suspended the Irgun's activities.

However, the Jewish Agency was suspected by the British authorities of using the Saison for political reasons, often handing in information on people it found politically objectionable but who were unconnected with the Irgun. This caused difficulty for the police, which had to find the actual insurgents among those detained.

While there was a strong desire within the Irgun to retaliate, Begin ordered a policy of restraint, insisting that the Jewish Agency would realise with time that the Saison was against the Yishuv's interests. As a result, the Irgun took no retaliatory actions and chose to wait it out. Its ability to act under coercion improved, and new members unknown to the Haganah were brought in. Over time, the enthusiasm within the Haganah for carrying out the Saison began to decline, especially due to the reports of torture and the necessity of acting as informants for the British. There were a growing number of defections from the Saison campaign. In March 1945, at a meeting of Haganah leaders in charge of the Saison at kibbutz Yagur, it was decided to stop the Saison. As the Saison wound down, the Irgun was able to resume attacks against the British in May, and successfully carried out widespread telegraph sabotage, blowing up hundreds of telegraph poles. However, attempts to bomb oil pipelines were foiled by the Haganah and an attempt to bomb government targets with clockwork mortars failed after they were discovered by the British, most having already been disabled by heavy rain. The Haganah ended the Saison in March 1945. However, the Irgun was still recovering from the devastating effects of the Saison, and could not yet mount major operations. As a result of the victory of the Labour Party, which was seen as being even more pro-Zionist than the Conservative Party, in the 1945 British general election which was held on July 5, the Irgun announced a grace period of a few weeks to allow for a satisfactory British initiative.

=== The Jewish Resistance Movement ===
British Government Statement of Information regarding the attacks

With the Labour victory, the Yishuv waited for an initiative. While Labour had expressed highly pro-Zionist positions, it decided against implementing them, as the alienation of the Arabs that would follow any imposed pro-Zionist solution would result in a threat to British hegemony in the Middle East and damage British economic interests. On August 25, the British Colonial Office informed Chaim Weizmann that the Jewish immigration quota would not be increased. As a result, the Jewish Agency began to consider military action as pressure mounted within the Haganah to strike at the British. As a result, the Jewish Agency reached out to the Irgun and Lehi to discuss a covert alliance, and negotiations began in August. At the end of October 1945, the Haganah, Irgun, and Lehi joined as the Jewish Resistance Movement, under which they worked under a unified command structure consisting of members of all three organisations and coordinated their activities. The Haganah also lent the Irgun command of 460 Palmach fighters and provided it with funding. While the Irgun and Lehi would continue to pursue a full-scale revolt against the British, the Haganah envisioned a more limited campaign to pressure the British into acceding to Zionist demands, tying attacks mainly to targets involving the issue of immigration.

Although September 1945 was relatively quiet, tensions rose. The Irgun continued distributing propaganda pamphlets and wall posters. The British continued to conduct searches and arrests and began dispatching military reinforcements to Palestine. The Haganah began operations on October 10, when the Palmach raided the Atlit detainee camp, freeing 208 Jewish illegal immigrants who were being held there. One British police officer was killed in the raid. On the night of October 31/November 1, the Haganah, Irgun, and Lehi carried out the Night of the Trains. The Haganah concentrated on attacking the railway network and the coast guard. Palmach units planted explosive charges across the railway system throughout Palestine, creating 242 breaks in the railway lines, while a stationmaster's office, a railway telephone installation, and a petrol wagon were also bombed. The Palmach's naval arm, the Palyam, sank two British coast guard boats in Jaffa. The Irgun attacked the Lydda railway station, destroying a locomotive and damaging six others. One Irgun fighter, a British soldier and policeman, and four Arabs were killed. Lehi attacked the oil refinery in Haifa. However, the explosives detonated prematurely as they were being carried, killing the Lehi fighter carrying them and severely injuring another. While severe damage was caused to the facility, the oil tanks, which had been the intended targets of the attack, remained intact.

On November 13, British Foreign Secretary Ernest Bevin presented the British government's new policy on Palestine in a speech to the House of Commons, under which the limits on Jewish immigration would continue and all sides would be consulted before a plan would be presented to the United Nations. In a press conference following his speech, Bevin stated that Britain had only undertaken to establish a Jewish home in Palestine and not a state. The news outraged the Yishuv and resulted in two days of rioting in Tel Aviv. The riots broke out on the evening of November 14 as Jewish mobs torched government offices and stoned police and soldiers. The British imposed a curfew on Tel Aviv but on November 15, large numbers of Jews violated the curfew and continued rioting, overturning vehicles including a military truck which was burned, tearing up a section of the railway line, attacking shops, a post office, and a branch of Barclays bank, and throwing homemade grenades. British forces repeatedly opened fire at rioters and used baton charges. Five Jewish rioters were killed and 56 were injured, of whom one later died from their injuries. Tel Aviv was subsequently under curfew until November 21. Palestine was relatively quiet until November 25, when the Palmach attacked British police stations at Hadera and near Herzliya which were used as watch points to detect illegal Jewish immigration, using automatic fire and explosives. Six British and eight Arab policemen were wounded. British troops and police subsequently carried out search operations on November 25 and November 26 against the Jewish settlements of Givat Haim, Hogla, Shefayim, and Rishpon, looking for insurgents and arms. They met violent resistance from Jewish civilians in the settlements as well as large numbers of Jews from outside who raced to confront the British, and clashes broke out which resulted in 8 Jews killed and 75 wounded, while the British reported 65 soldiers and 16 policemen injured. The Palmach proposed ambushing British forces returning from search operations, but Jewish Agency head David Ben-Gurion rejected the plan. The Mandate was again quiet until December 27, when the Irgun and Lehi launched coordinated attacks on the CID headquarters in Jerusalem, the CID station in Jaffa, and the Royal Electrical and Mechanical Engineers workshop in Tel Aviv. The security forces lost 10 dead, six British policemen and four African colonial troops, and 12 wounded, while one Irgun fighter was killed. The British reacted with a large cordon and search operation in Jerusalem and the Tel Aviv area, with searches and curfews lasting until January 5.

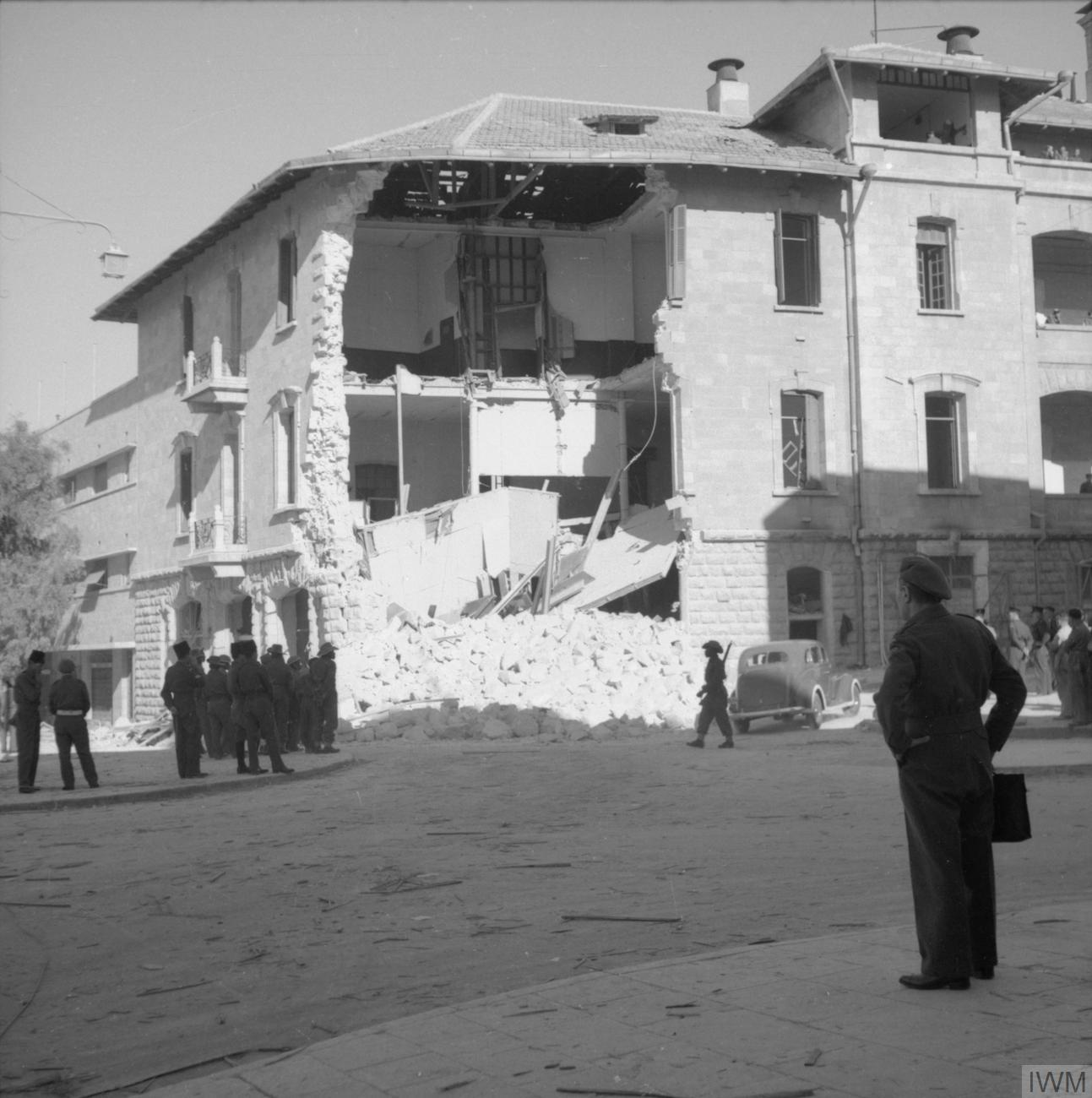
Aftermath of the bombing of CID headquarters in Jerusalem

Throughout this period, British forces continued to grow in strength. By 1946, the British security forces carried out constant patrols in urban areas, and roadblocks and observation posts were established throughout Palestine. The authorities established security zones for government, army, and police installations, which were heavily guarded compounds ringed with barbed wire and sandbags. The largest, in Jerusalem, was dubbed "Bevingrad" by the Jewish population. The security forces mounted frequent search operations and arrests. Those suspected of insurgent activity could be held without trial and were often sent to internment camps in Africa. The mail and overseas cable traffic was also monitored.

On January 12, 1946, the first serious insurgent operation of the year occurred when the Irgun derailed a British payroll train with a bomb, injuring three constables. The Irgun fighters made off with 35,000 pounds. On January 19, the Irgun launched coordinated attacks in Jerusalem, bombing an electrical substation to black out the area as assault teams descended on the police headquarters and central prison located in the Russian Compound and the Palestine Broadcasting Service studios. While the attackers succeeded in damaging the police headquarters and prison with explosives and withdrawing, a British Army patrol intercepted the Irgun fighters on their way to attack the radio station. In the firefight that followed, a British officer and two Irgun fighters were killed, while a third was wounded and taken prisoner. As the attackers retreated, they left mines to slow pursuers. A British Army truck detonated one of the mines, and a police bomb disposal expert was killed attempting to defuse another. Two days later, the Palmach again bombed the police coast guard station at Givat Olga, killing a British soldier, while a Palmach attack on the Royal Air Force radar station on Mount Carmel failed when the bomb left by a Palmach team was defused in time. In late January and early February, the Irgun conducted two successful arms raids against RAF facilities. On February 5, the police headquarters at Safed was attacked and on the following day, an attack on a King's African Rifles camp in Holon killed an African soldier and a British officer. African soldiers stationed in the camp subsequently rioted and killed two Jews and wounded four. On February 20, the Palmach successfully bombed the RAF radar station on Mount Carmel, injuring eight RAF personnel, and the following day, the Palmach attacked the Police Mobile Force stations at Shefa-'Amr, Sarona, and Kfar Vitkin. Four Palmach fighters were killed in the attack on the police station at Sarona.

In an operation known as the "Night of the Airfields", the Irgun and Lehi simultaneously attacked three Royal Air Force airfields at Lydda, Qastina, and Kfar Sirkin on February 25, destroying fifteen aircraft and damaging eight. One Irgun fighter was killed during the retreat from Qastina. This was followed up with an Irgun arms raid on the Sarafand army camp on March 7. Although the Irgun force succeeded in making off with stolen arms, four Irgun fighters were captured, two of them wounded. On March 22, a British soldier was killed in Tel Aviv by a mine. The Irgun then carried out a major operation against the railway network on April 2, destroying five railway bridges, destroying a railway station, and cutting the Acre-Haifa line. One Irgun fighter was killed during the operation. However, during the retreat, a large part of the Irgun force was spotted from a British reconnaissance plane as it fled toward Bat Yam and was surrounded by British soldiers. Another Irgun fighter was killed and 31 were captured, including Eitan Livni, the Irgun Chief of Operations. Livni's place was subsequently taken by Amichai Paglin. Paglin then began planning an arms raid to make good the losses and planned an attack on a Ramat Gan police station, which occurred on April 23. Although the Irgun managed to make off with looted arms, the raid developed into a firefight in which two Irgun fighters and an Arab constable were killed, and one Irgun fighter, Dov Gruner, was wounded and captured. Two days later, Lehi followed up with an attack on a car park in Tel Aviv occupied by the British 6th Airborne Division. Lehi fighters burst into tents, shooting soldiers in their beds and looting arms, firing at soldiers responding, and then retreating, laying mines to cover their retreat, one of which was detonated by a soldier. Seven paratroopers were killed in the attack. The British were outraged by the attack. Major General James Cassels, told the acting mayor of Tel Aviv that he held the Jewish community responsible. The British imposed a collective punishment on the population of Tel Aviv, imposing a dawn to dusk curfew on the city roads and closing all cafes, bars, cinemas, and other places of entertainment and socialisation until May 12. The authorities had seriously considered more severe penalties such as demolishing all houses around the car park including those that had played no role in the assault and imposing a collective fine on the entire city but had decided against all other options due to them being politically undesirable or impractical. In the aftermath of the attack, soldiers of the 6th Airborne Division rampaged in Netanya, Be'er Tuvia, and Givat Haim, attacking residents and vandalizing property.

In addition, a major successful act of non-violent resistance against the British known as the Birya affair took place in March 1946. After British soldiers had discovered arms during a search of the Jewish settlement of Birya in the northern Galilee, they arrested all 24 inhabitants and declared the settlement an occupied military zone. On March 14, thousands of Jewish youths organised by the Haganah resettled Birya, only to be driven off by British tanks and armored cars hours later. They reappeared the same night and settled it for the third time. On March 17, the British agreed to the presence of 20 Jewish inhabitants on the site.

On June 10, the Irgun carried out another railway sabotage operation in the Lydda district, the Jerusalem to Jaffa line, and Haifa, bombing six trains. Three days later Irgun fighters Yosef Simchon and Michael Ashbel, two Irgun fighters who had participated in the arms raid on Sarafand camp and had been wounded and captured, were sentenced to death by a British military court. The Irgun immediately set out to find British hostages. Meanwhile, attacks on railway infrastructure continued. On the night of June 16/17, the Haganah carried out an operation known as the Night of the Bridges. Palmach units attacked eleven road and railway bridges along the borders with Lebanon, Syria, Transjordan, and Egypt to suspend the transportation routes used by the British Army. Nine of the eleven bridges were successfully destroyed. The attack on road bridge at Nahal Kziv failed and developed into a firefight, with 14 Palmach fighters killed. The attack on the Nahal Kziv railway bridge was subsequently called off. This was followed up by a Lehi raid on the Kishon railway workshops in Haifa on the night of June 17. The raiders destroyed a locomotive and set some buildings on fire. Two Lehi fighters were accidentally killed by an explosion during the sabotage operations. However, Lehi had underestimated the time in which the British could react, and as the raiders retreated in a truck, they ran into a British roadblock manned by troops with heavy machine guns and supported by armor. The British fired on the truck, killing nine of the attackers and wounding thirteen. The surviving members of the assault team were all captured. The following day, the Irgun succeeded in taking British hostages with which to bargain over the lives of its two fighters who had been sentenced to death. Five British officers were abducted in an Irgun raid on a British officer's club in Tel Aviv. The British responded with a massive search operation in Tel Aviv, which was placed under curfew, and searches in other suspected areas. During a search in Kfar Giladi, two Jews were killed and seven injured while resisting. The next day, another British officer was abducted in Jerusalem and taken to a hideout in the city, but he managed to escape after nearly two days in captivity. Curfews and searches continued and the Jewish Agency requested the release of the officers. The Irgun released two of the hostages, as it would be easier to hide three hostages as opposed to five, and to lend weight to the threat to the lives of the remaining three officers. The Irgun released the two officers in Tel Aviv and threatened that if Simchon and Ashbel were executed, it would kill the three remaining hostages. The Jewish Agency and Haganah announced that their intervention had secured the release of the officers but the Irgun denied it. The Irgun followed up with a raid on a diamond polishing plant, stealing a substantial quantity of diamonds to finance operations.

=== Breakup of the Jewish Resistance Movement ===
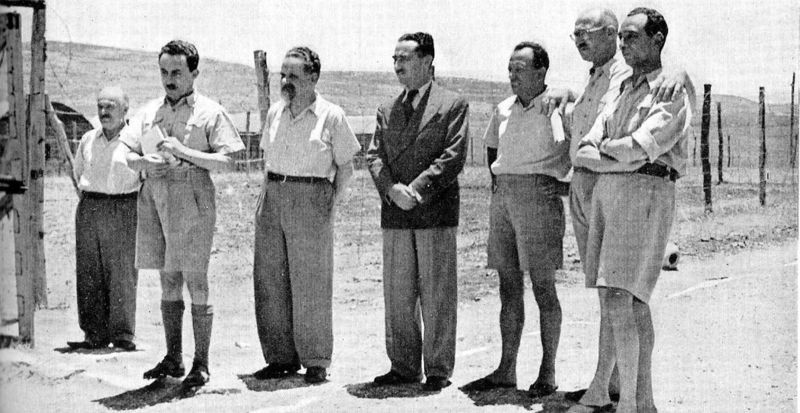
Zionist leaders arrested during Operation Agatha, in a detention camp in Latrun

By June 1946, the British were increasingly certain that the Haganah, acting under Jewish Agency orders, was involved in insurgent activities despite the protestations of innocence by Jewish Agency leaders. Following the Night of the Bridges, High Commissioner Alan Cunningham decided to move against the Jewish Agency and Haganah. As a result, the British planned a massive military and police operation called Operation Agatha, under which Jewish institutions and settlements would be raided and mass arrests carried out against Jewish leaders and Haganah members. The objective of the operation was to find documentary evidence of Jewish Agency complicity in insurgent attacks and of an alliance between the Haganah, Irgun, and Lehi, to break the military power of the Haganah, and to prevent a unilateral declaration of a Jewish state. The operation began on June 29 and continued until July 1. It was known as the Black Sabbath in the Yishuv. Curfews were imposed throughout Palestine as British troops and police raided the Jewish Agency headquarters in Jerusalem, its offices in Tel Aviv, and other Zionist institutions, confiscating nine tons of documents. The British searched 27 Jewish settlements and discovered fifteen arms caches, including one of the Haganah's three central arsenals at kibbutz Yagur, which was a major blow to the Haganah's efforts to prepare militarily for independence. British search parties encountered fierce resistance by the residents of many of the settlements searched, and four Jews were killed while resisting British searches. The British arrested 2,718 Jews, including four members of the Jewish Agency Executive, seven Haganah officers, and nearly half of the Palmach's fighters. They were detained indefinitely without trial.

However, although Cunningham had decided on firm military action, he chose not to have the two Irgun fighters under sentences of death executed given the Irgun threat to kill the British officers it was holding hostage if the British carried out the executions. On July 3, he commuted the sentences of Yosef Simchon and Michael Ashbel to life imprisonment, and the Irgun released its remaining British hostages the following day.

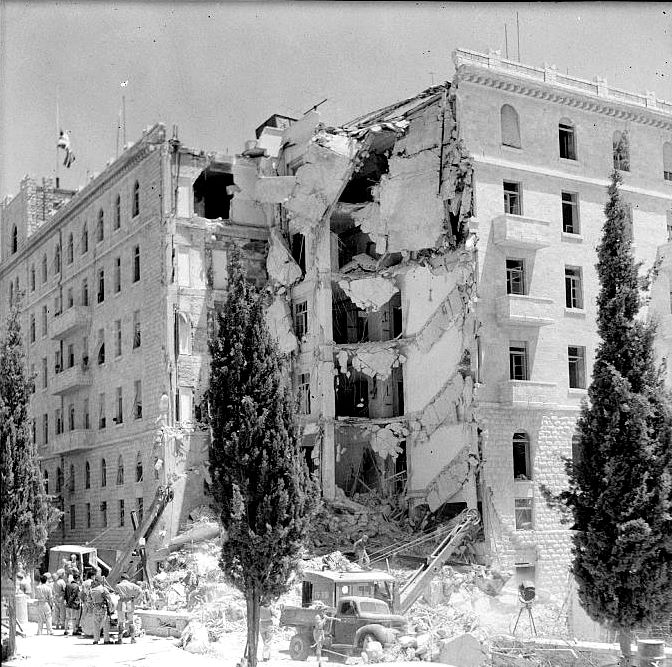
The King David Hotel following the explosion

The documents seized from the Jewish Agency were stored at the King David Hotel. It had been requisitioned by the British for use as a military and government headquarters, although part of it continued to function as a hotel. In order to destroy incriminating documents regarding Jewish Agency and Haganah involvement in the campaign as well as the identities of Haganah members, the Haganah began jointly planning an attack on the King David Hotel with the Irgun. Although the Haganah repeatedly requested that the operation be delayed due to political considerations, the Irgun decided to press ahead and on July 22, carried out the King David Hotel bombing. Irgun fighters successfully infiltrated the hotel and planted bombs before fleeing under fire. One Irgun fighter was killed and another wounded when the attackers were fired on while retreating. An Irgun telephone warning to evacuate the hotel was not taken seriously, and the hotel had not been evacuated when the bombs exploded. The bombing destroyed much of the southern wing of the hotel, which housed the government secretariat and military headquarters. A total of 91 people were killed: 41 Palestinian Arabs, 28 British nationals including 13 British soldiers, 17 Palestinian Jews, 2 Armenians, 1 Russian, 1 Greek, and 1 Egyptian. Most of the dead were staff of the hotel or Secretariat.

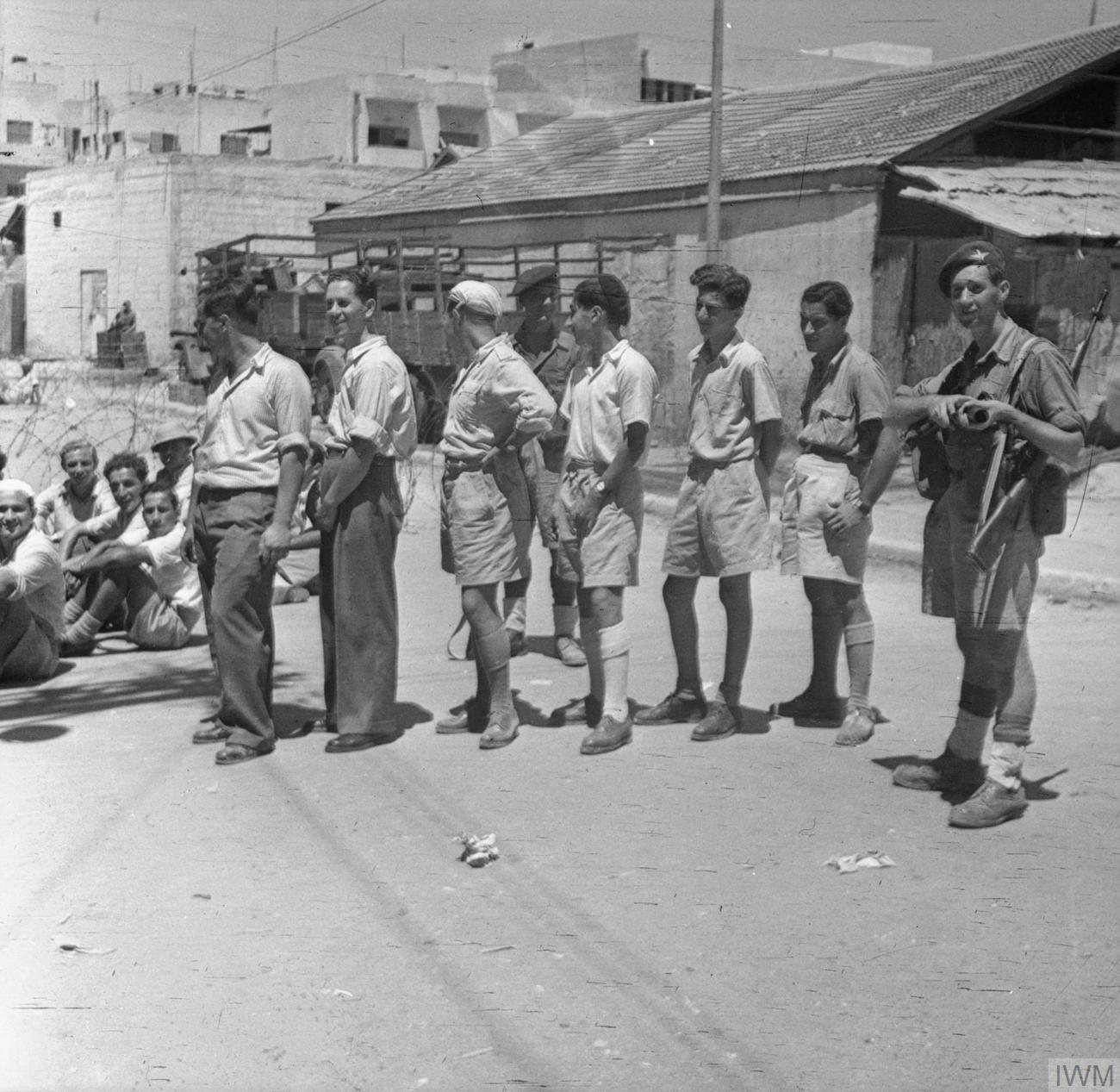
Jewish civilians guarded by a soldier of the Parachute Regiment wait to be interrogated during Operation Shark

The British responded to the bombing with Operation Shark, a cordon and search operation in which the entire city of Tel Aviv and the Jewish Quarter of Jaffa would be cordoned off and searched building by building and the entire Jewish population except for the elderly and children were to be screened. The British chose to search Tel Aviv due to faulty intelligence that the bombers had come from Tel Aviv, when in fact they had been based in Jerusalem. The operation was conducted from July 30 to August 2, during which British forces searched tens of thousands of buildings and screened most of the Jewish population. Tel Aviv was placed under curfew for 22 hours a day with residents only allowed to leave their homes for two hours every evening. A total of 787 arrests were made, and according to former Irgun high command member Shmuel Katz, the operation succeeded in arresting "Almost all of the leaders and staff of the Irgun and Lehi, and the Tel Aviv manpower of both organizations." Among the underground leaders arrested was Yitzhak Shamir, a member of the Lehi high command. He was subsequently interned in Africa. Irgun leader Menachem Begin escaped capture by hiding in a secret compartment that had been built into the wall of his home. In addition, the Jewish neighborhoods of Jerusalem were kept under curfew for 16 days.

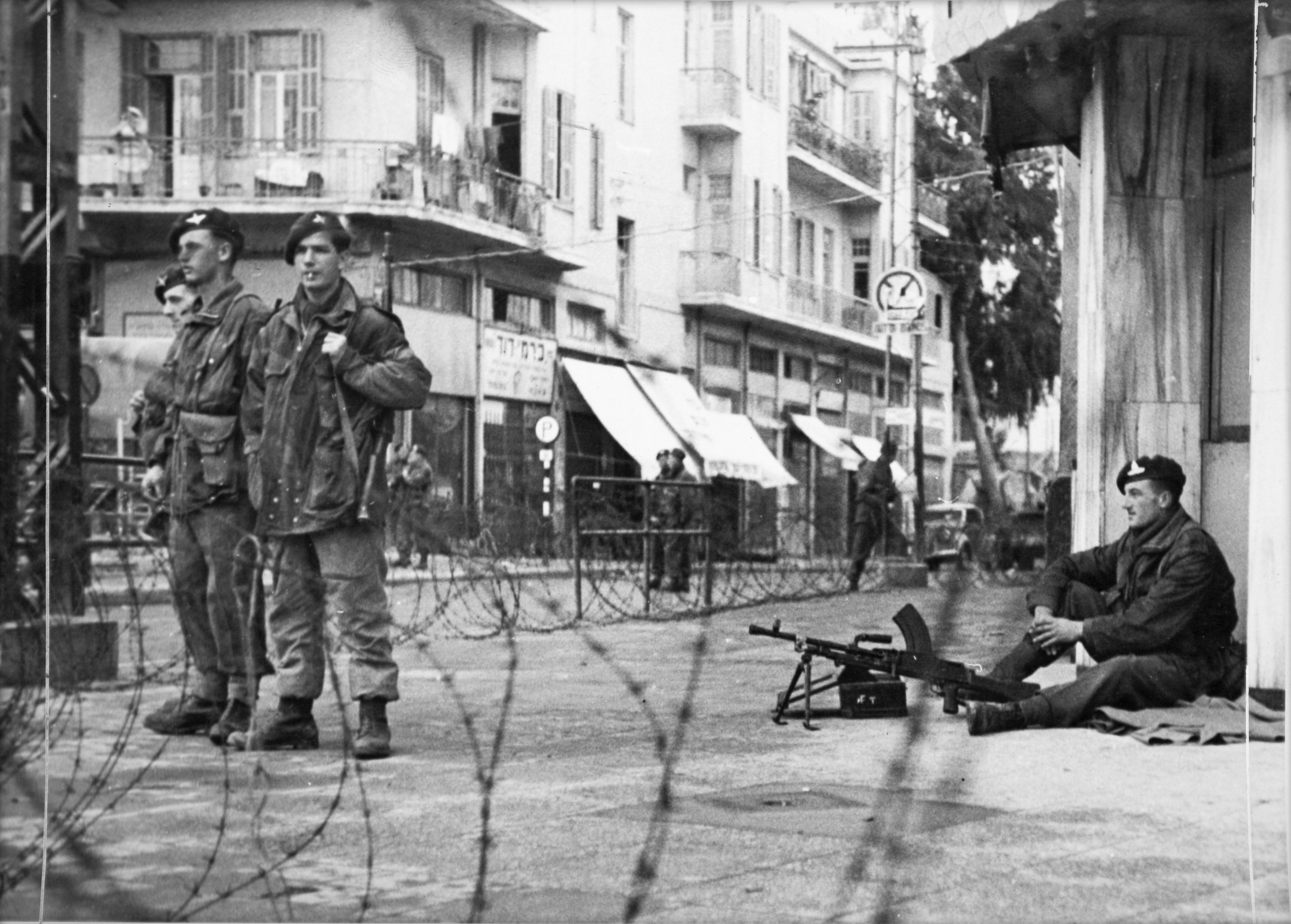
British troops occupying an intersection in Tel Aviv during Operation Shark

In the aftermath of the bombing, the head of the British forces in Palestine, General Sir Evelyn Barker, responded by ordering British personnel to boycott all:

Jewish establishments, restaurants, shop, and private dwellings. No British soldier is to have social intercourse with any Jew. ... I appreciate that these measures will inflict some hardship on the troops, yet I am certain that if my reasons are fully explained to them they will understand their propriety and will be punishing the Jews in a way the race dislikes as much as any, by striking at their pockets and showing our contempt of them.

Barker, whose forces participated in the capture of the Bergen Belsen concentration camp, made many antisemitic comments in his letters to Katy Antonius and was relieved of his post a few weeks after issuing the statement. A few months after his return to England, Barker was sent a letter bomb by the Irgun, but it was detected before it exploded. The Jewish Agency was issuing constant complaints to the British administration about antisemitic remarks by British soldiers: "they frequently said 'Bloody Jew' or 'pigs', sometimes shouted 'Heil Hitler', and promised they would finish off what Hitler had begun. Churchill wrote that most British military officers in Palestine were strongly pro-Arab."

As a result of Operation Agatha and Operation Shark, the Jewish Agency decided to end the Jewish Resistance Movement, which was formally dissolved on August 23. From then on, the Haganah would concentrate mainly on illegal immigration and mount occasional Palmach raids on British targets associated with stopping illegal immigration, while the Irgun and Lehi would focus on continuous military operations against the British. The Jewish Agency would continue to publicly denounce Irgun and Lehi operations but would not take action to suppress the two organisations.

=== Resurgence ===
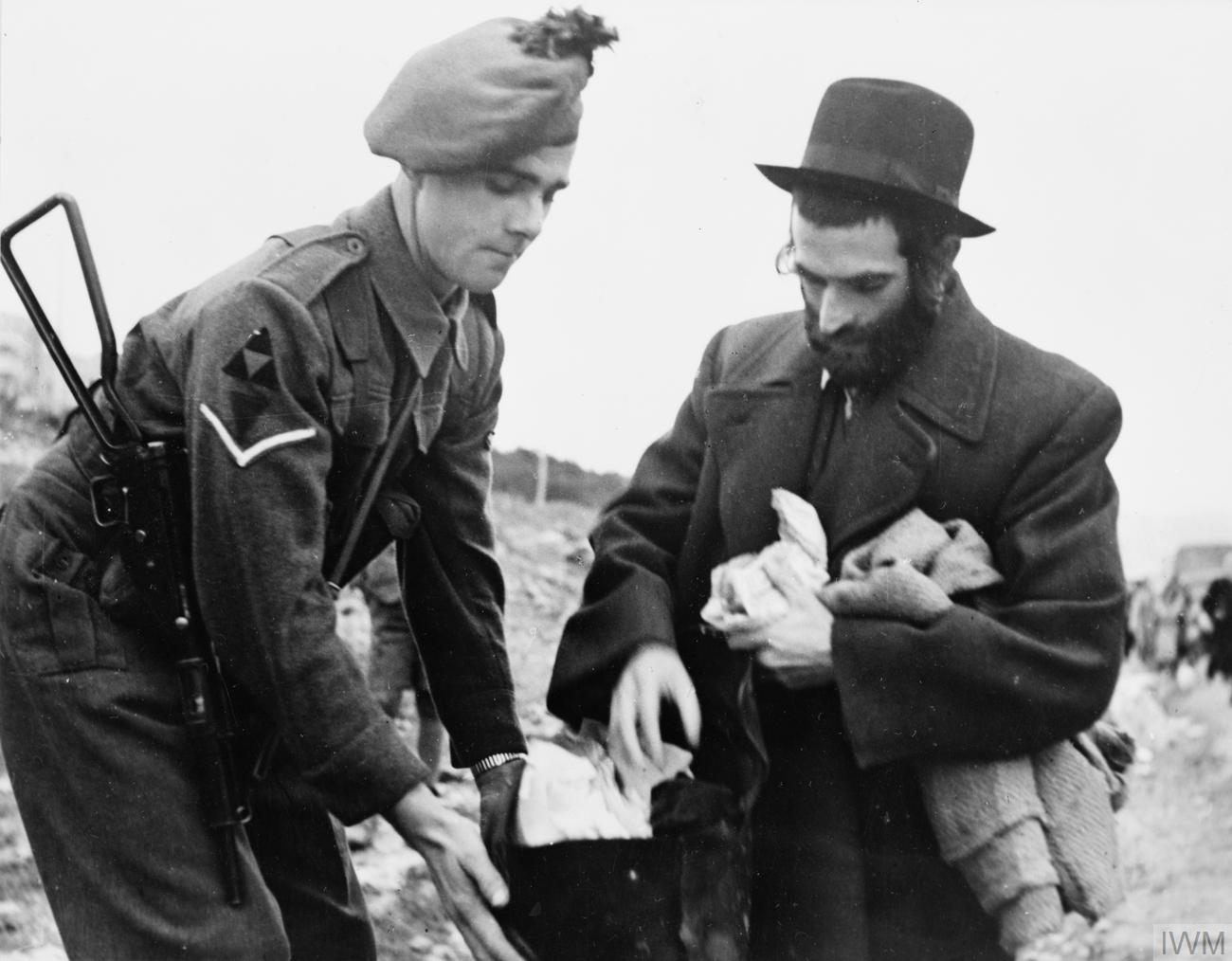
A British soldier inspects a Jewish civilian at a roadblock near Jerusalem following the Night of the Beatings

Following Operation Shark, the Mandate was relatively quiet until September, though in August the Palmach sabotaged the British transport ships Empire Rival and Empire Heywood, which were used to deport illegal Jewish immigrants to the Cyprus internment camps. In September, attacks picked up again, starting with two assassinations carried out by Lehi on September 9: British Army intelligence officer Desmond Doran was killed in a grenade attack on his home, and police sergeant T.G. Martin, who had been responsible for Yitzhak Shamir's arrest, was shot dead at a tennis court. In the early morning hours of September 10, a British soldier was killed when Jewish insurgents ambushed army vehicles with automatic fire near Petah Tikva. On September 20, a railway station in Haifa was bombed and a British soldier was shot dead in Tel Aviv two days later. On September 31, a British soldier was killed by automatic fire in an ambush while en route from Lydda to Netanya by motorcycle. In October, Jewish insurgents began using vehicle mines against British vehicles. Eight British soldiers were killed in mine attacks throughout October. Another two were killed and five injured by bombs hidden inside dustbins and a shop shutter which detonated as they passed. In addition, a shooting attack against two British airmen in Jerusalem killed one and seriously wounded the other one, and British police officer William Bruce was shot dead in an assassination by the Palmach as vengeance over allegations that he had tortured Palmach prisoners. On October 30, the Irgun raided the Jerusalem railway station. The British had advance knowledge of the plan and a police team opened fire on the raiders, wounding four of them and forcing them to retreat after depositing the explosives. Four of the attackers were later captured including two of the wounded ones. One of them was Meir Feinstein, who was tried and sentenced to death for his role in the action. The interior of station was subsequently badly damaged and a British constable killed when the bombs the raiding party left behind exploded during an attempt to remove them. The following day, Irgun operatives in Italy bombed the British Embassy in Rome, which seriously damaged the building. The Italian authorities subsequently arrested Irgun suspects and discovered an Irgun sabotage school in Rome. One of the Irgun members arrested was Israel Epstein, a childhood friend of Irgun commander Menachem Begin who worked in propaganda and liaison duties for the Irgun high command. He was shot dead while trying to escape custody.

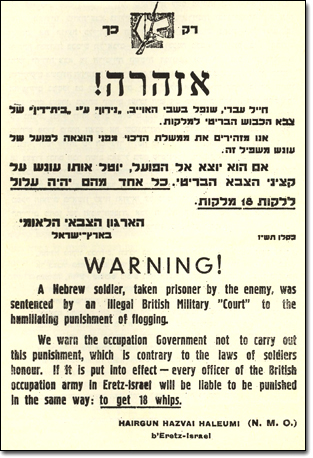
Irgun poster warning the British not to carry out the planned flogging of an Irgun member prior to the Night of the Beatings

November saw continued escalation. On November 9, three British policemen were killed after entering a house booby-trapped with explosives after being lured there through a phone call. Two more policemen were killed by bombs two days later. On November 14, widespread attacks with electrically-detonated mines were carried out against the railway system. On the evening of November 17, a 15-cwt police truck hit a mine near Tel Aviv. Three British policemen and a Royal Air Force sergeant were killed, and three other police and RAF personnel in the truck were wounded. In the aftermath of the attack, enraged British troops rampaged through Hayarkon Street in Tel Aviv, causing damage to several cafes and injuring 29 Jews. Within the following two days, a British officer was killed when a mine exploded during a bomb disposal operation on a railway line near Kfar Sirkin and the income tax office in Jerusalem was bombed, killing a Jewish worker. Nine more British soldiers were killed in vehicle mine attacks against military traffic in December, and another two were killed when a vehicle laden with a time bomb detonated in front of the Sarafand base.

On December 29, the Irgun carried out an operation known as the Night of the Beatings. After three Irgun members were arrested for a December 13 bank robbery carried out to finance the Irgun's activities, a court convicted them and handed down heavy prison sentences. One of the Irgun members, Binyamin Kimchi, was also sentenced to be flogged 18 times in addition to his prison term. The Irgun warned the British that it would whip British officers if the flogging was carried out. Kimchi was flogged on December 28, and the following day, Irgun teams set out to abduct British soldiers and give them eighteen lashes. In Netanya, a British officer was abducted from a hotel, taken to a eucalyptus grove and flogged, then returned to the hotel. A British soldier was seized in a cafe in Rishon LeZion and flogged in the street, and two sergeants were abducted from a hotel in Tel Aviv, tied to a tree in a public park, and lashed eighteen times. During the operation, a car carrying a five-man Irgun team ran into a British roadblock and in the firefight that followed, one of the Irgun fighters was killed and the remaining four captured. A variety of weapons and two whips were found in the car. Three of the captured Irgun members – Yehiel Dresner, Mordechai Alkahi, and Eliezer Kashani, were subsequently sentenced to death. From December 30 to January 17, 1947, the British mounted cordon and search operations in Netanya, Petah Tikva, Rishon LeZion, Tel Aviv, and Rehovot. Over 6,000 people were screened, of which a small percentage were detained, and a meager amount of weapons and ammunition was found. Meanwhile, Irgun and Lehi operations continued. A series of attacks took place on the night of January 2. A British soldier was killed in a mine attack on a Bren gun carrier in Kiryat Motzkin. Grenade attacks were conducted against four military facilities in Jerusalem. A number of vehicles were mined and police and military facilities in Tel Aviv and near Kiryat Haim were attacked with mortars, bombs, and gunfire. The Irgun also attacked the British military headquarters at Citrus House in Tel Aviv, and a Jewish policeman was killed in the raid. British troops and Irgun fighters exchanged fire, and an attempt was made to destroy armored cars parked outside the building with flamethrowers, but British fire directed at the Irgun flamethrower operators forced them to retreat. Throughout the following days three military and police vehicles were mined, causing a number of injuries, and the Hadera railway station was attacked. In what has been described as the first car bombing in history, Lehi bombed the district police headquarters in Haifa on January 12, using a bomb-laden truck which was parked next to the building and abandoned before exploding. Two British and two Arab policemen were killed. During this time, the British continued to reinforce their garrison in Palestine and stringent restrictions on the movement of British personnel were imposed to lessen their vulnerability. Soldiers were instructed to only walk in groups of not less than four when off base and to avoid cafes.

After Irgun fighter Dov Gruner was sentenced to death by a military court in Jerusalem on January 24, the Irgun abducted two British hostages: a retired British major, H.A.I Collins, from his home in Jerusalem, and a British judge, Ralph Windham, from his courtroom in Tel Aviv as he was hearing a case. The British immediately imposed a curfew on Tel Aviv and large parts of Jerusalem and Haifa. After the Jewish Agency was informally told that Gruner's execution would not be carried out, the two men were released.

In early February 1947, the British launched Operation Polly, an evacuation of all non-essential British civilians from Palestine. A number of mine attacks were carried out in February, and oil pipelines were sabotaged. A mortar attack on Ein Shemer airfield occurred on February 19, and a British civilian and two Jews were killed in an attack on Barclays Bank in Haifa.

=== Martial law period ===
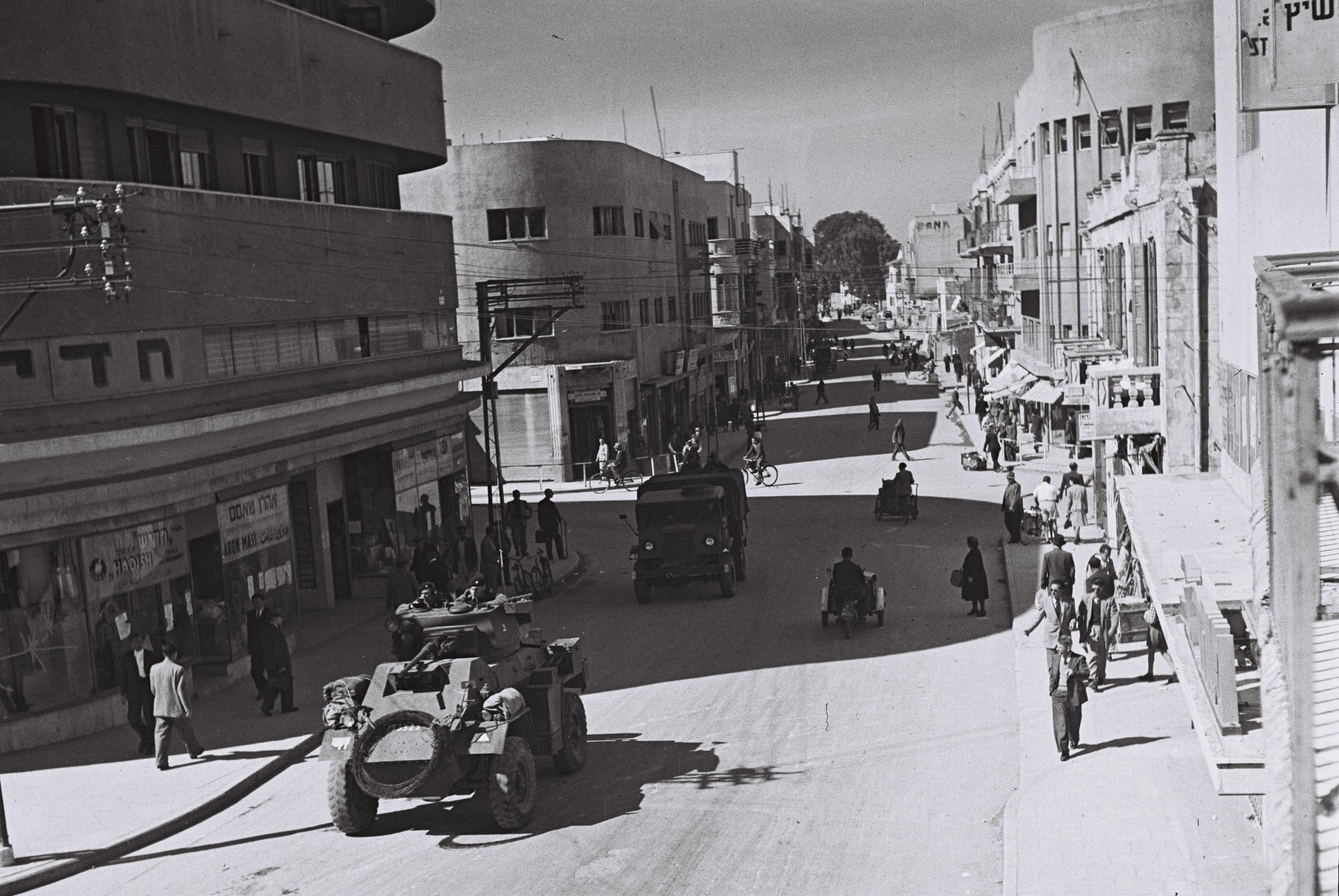
British Army vehicles patrol a street in Tel Aviv during a three-hour break in the curfew

The Palestine administration had increasingly threatened the application of martial law to Jewish areas as a response to continued insurgent activity. The Irgun was curious about what effects martial law would have and decided to deliberately provoke it by launching a wave of attacks throughout Palestine on March 1.

On March 1, 1947, the Irgun launched a series of attacks throughout Palestine, beginning with an attack on the Goldsmith officer's club, a British Army officer's club located in the Jerusalem security zone. Under the cover of machine gun fire, an Irgun assault team drove up to the club in a stolen army truck, which drove through a gap in the barbed-wire defenses surrounding, the entrance to a military parking lot near the club. Three Irgun fighters clad in British Army battle dress jumped from the truck and tossed explosive charges into the building before quickly retreating. The explosion caused heavy damage to the building and killed 13 people inside: four soldiers including two officers and nine civilian employees, including the club's Italian general manager. During the attack, a British police vehicle nearby was raked by machine gun fire, killing a policeman and wounding three others. The Irgun also carried out mine attacks on the inter-urban roads against British military vehicles. Two soldiers were killed when a scout car detonated a mine on the Haifa-Jaffa Road and another soldier was killed by a vehicle mine in Tel Aviv. Army depots at Hadera, Pardes Hanna, and Beit Lid were attacked with mortar and machine gun fire, and 15 vehicles were destroyed in an attack on an army vehicle lot in Haifa. A total of 18 people were killed, including 13 civilians.

The British swiftly imposed curfews and conducted searches. On the following day, the authorities declared martial law in the Tel Aviv metropolitan area, in an area encompassing the cities and towns of Tel Aviv, Ramat Gan, Bnei Brak, Givatayim, and Petah Tikva, in the Sharon plain, and in four Jewish neighbourhoods of Jerusalem. In the Tel Aviv region, the operation was codenamed Operation Hippo while in Jerusalem it was codenamed Operation Elephant. Up to 300,000 Jews were affected. Jewish residents in areas under martial law were put under curfew for all but three hours of a day. Civil services were suspended and jurisdiction over civilian criminal offenses was transferred from civilian courts to military courts. Most telephone services were cut off, driving non-security forces vehicles was prohibited, and movement in and out of the affected areas required a permit. British soldiers conducted searches throughout the affected areas. Soldiers were granted policing authority and were told to shoot curfew violators on sight. Pedestrians and motorists were fired at by troops in Tel Aviv, and a Jewish official had his car riddled by bullets. In Jerusalem, British troops killed two Jewish civilians during the martial law period, including a four-year-old girl standing on the balcony of her home in Jerusalem. Martial law was imposed both to search for Irgun and Lehi members and to inflict economic losses on the Yishuv as a collective punishment over the failure of the Jewish Agency and the Jewish population to cooperate with the authorities in suppressing the insurgency.

In spite of this, Irgun and Lehi attacks both inside and outside the zones under martial law continued. On the day martial law was declared, three British soldiers were killed in a vehicle mine attack on Mount Carmel in Haifa, and another soldier was killed by a mine in Hadera. Attacks on military and police facilities and vehicles, as well as railway sabotage, continued throughout the period of martial law. The Haifa Municipal Assessments Office was destroyed on March 5, and two days later, Irgun assault teams simultaneously attacked three targets in Tel Aviv, including army headquarters at Citrus House. On March 12, the Irgun carried out a pre-dawn assault on the Royal Army Pay Corps camp at the Schneller Orphanage in Jerusalem, which was located in an area under martial law, within a British security zone. After breaking through the peripheral fortifications and cutting through barbed wire, they set explosive charges on the facility under covering fire. The resulting explosion heavily damaged the facility and killed a British soldier. On March 14, an oil pipeline in Haifa and a section of the railway line near Be'er Ya'akov were blown up.

Martial law was lifted on March 17 after 15 days. The authorities announced that 78 people had been arrested for suspected insurgent activity, of whom 15 were identified as Lehi members, 12 as Irgun members, and the rest "connected." The Yishuv suffered an estimated $10 million in economic losses as a result of martial law. Attacks had continued throughout the martial law period, and between March 1 and March 13, 14 British personnel and 15 civilians were killed in insurgent attacks. The attacks on security forces and oil pipeline sabotage continued after martial law was lifted, with an officer killed in an attack in Ramla on March 20 and a soldier killed in a mine attack on the Cairo-Haifa train at Rehovot. A British officer and policeman were killed in a shooting attack on March 29.

=== Peaking of the insurgency ===
In the early morning hours of March 31, Lehi carried out the most devastating attack on the oil industry of the campaign. Two bombs were detonated in the Haifa oil refinery, causing the facility to burst into flames. The oil tanks burned uncontrollably for nearly three weeks, with the fires only coming under control on April 18. The underground organisations continued their campaign. Two British constables were shot in Jerusalem on April 8, one of whom died. A series of Irgun attacks took place in Tel Aviv, Haifa, and Netanya. Faced with continued attacks, the British reacted with collective punishment and the death penalty in order to reassert authority. On April 14, the authorities evicted 110 Jews from their homes in the Haifa neighbourhood of Hadar HaCarmel as collective punishment for a mine attack on a British jeep on a nearby road ten days prior. On April 16, four Irgun fighters who had been sentenced to death – Dov Gruner, Yehiel Dresner, Mordechai Alkahi, and Eliezer Kashani – were executed in Acre Prison. The following day, the authorities scheduled the executions of Irgun fighter Meir Feinstein and Lehi fighter Moshe Barazani, who had been sentenced to death and were awaiting execution in Jerusalem Central Prison, for April 21. The Irgun attempted to find British hostages to save their lives, but having anticipated this, the British confined almost all of their troops to barracks or within the security zones, and Irgun patrols fruitlessly wandered the streets in search of a vulnerable soldier. However, the Irgun did manage to smuggle a grenade to Feinstein and Barazani. Although they originally planned to kill their executioners with the grenade, after learning that a rabbi was to accompany them to the gallows, they committed suicide by detonating the grenade while embracing each other, with the grenade lodged between them, a few hours before their scheduled executions. The Irgun subsequently tried to kidnap Britons to hang as a reprisal, but consistently failed. On April 18, an Irgun fighter was killed in an attack on a British armored vehicle with the intention of capturing its occupants. The Irgun finally gave up after a group of Irgun members seized a British businessman from a bar but spared his life after learning he was Jewish.

The Irgun and Lehi continued to carry out normal military operations during this period. On April 18, a British soldier was killed in an attack on a medical facility, and a Red Cross depot was bombed with numerous soldiers injured two days later. An Irgun fighter was also killed On April 21, attacks on military cars took place at three locations and two jeeps were mined. On April 22, the Cairo-Haifa train was mined near Rehovot and sprayed with gunfire after the derailment. Five British soldiers and three civilians were killed. Another soldier was killed in an attack in Jerusalem. On April 25, a bomb-laden van that had been stolen from Palestine Post and Telegraph was used to bomb a Palestine Police facility at Sarona, killing four British constables. The following day, Lehi assassinated Albert Conquest, the Assistant Superintendent of Police, who was the head of the Haifa CID.

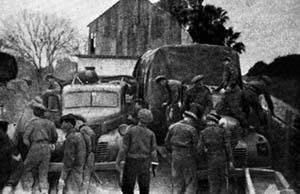
Irgun men in British Army uniforms, preparing to stage the Acre Prison break

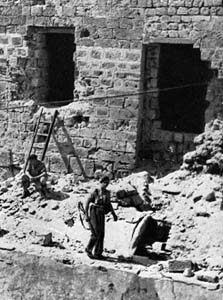
The Acre Prison wall after the break

On May 4, 1947, the Irgun carried out the Acre Prison break. An Irgun convoy in the guise of a British military convoy entered Acre and Irgun fighters disguised as British soldiers blew a hole in the wall of Acre Prison with explosive charges, while the 41 Irgun and Lehi members who had been designated as escapees rushed forward and blasted through the inner gates with explosive charges that had been smuggled to them. As they escaped, they lit a fire and tossed grenades to cause further confusion inside the prison. The prisoners escaped through the hole and boarded trucks, which then fled Acre along the designated escape route. Meanwhile, Irgun blocking squads mined all the roads into Acre except the designated escape route and an Irgun squad launched a mortar attack on a British Army camp before withdrawing to delay any response. Five British soldiers were injured in a mine explosion. However, one of the blocking squads failed to withdraw in time and was captured. The first escape truck ran into a British roadblock and all of the escapees were killed or recaptured, including one accidentally killed by friendly fire. The second truck took a burst of fire but managed to get away. In total, four in the Irgun attacking party were killed and five captured, and five of the escapees were killed. Of the 41 designated escapees, 27 managed to escape, along with 214 Arab prisoners.

Two days after the raid on Acre Prison, a special police unit commanded by Roy Farran abducted Alexander Rubowitz, an unarmed 17-year-old Lehi member who was subsequently killed by Farran, resulting in a scandal. Farran was tried but acquitted over the affair.

The Irgun and Lehi continued regular attacks such as railway sabotage, bombings, minings, shooting attacks, and oil pipeline sabotage. Four policemen and two soldiers were killed between May 12 and May 16. However, the most pressing issue for the Irgun high command was the capture of five men in the attacking party during the raid on Acre Prison. There was a certainty that they would be tried and convicted of capital offenses and while two of them, Amnon Michaelov and Nachman Zitterbaum, were legally minors and thus too young to hang, the three others, Avshalom Haviv, Meir Nakar, and Yaakov Weiss, were not. The Irgun immediately began looking for hostages. Two policemen were abducted from a swimming pool in Herzliya but escaped shortly afterward. During this period, the Haganah carried out a campaign that the Irgun dubbed the "Little Saison". Due to the presence of the United Nations Special Committee on Palestine (UNSCOP), which arrived on June 16 to investigate conditions in Palestine and recommend a solution, the Haganah acted to restrain the Irgun, foiling several Irgun operations. One Haganah member was killed by an explosive device when the Haganah foiled a potentially catastrophic attack against Citrus House. However, the Haganah did not directly collaborate with the security forces and hand underground fighters over to the British as it had done during the Saison. On the same day that UNSCOP arrived, a British military court sentenced Haviv, Nakar, and Weiss to death. The Irgun's continued search for hostages faced further complications when Lehi decided to avenge the death of Alexander Rubowitz with attacks on British personnel. Fearing that it would be even more difficult to find hostages with the additional security precautions, the Irgun asked Lehi to hold off on its planned attacks, and Lehi agreed to hold off for a week. After attempts to capture a police official and an administrative officer failed, Lehi launched a series of shooting attacks. Three British soldiers were killed in an attack in Tel Aviv, and a British officer was killed in an attack on a cafe in Haifa. Four soldiers were also wounded in an attack on a beach in Herzliya.

On July 11, the Irgun abducted two British soldiers, Sergeants Clifford Martin and Mervyn Paice, in Netanya as hostages for the three Irgun members who had been sentenced to death. The British Army subsequently threw a cordon around Netanya and twenty Jewish settlements in the surrounding area in an operation codenamed Operation Tiger. Martial law was imposed, and the residents were kept under curfew as troops searched the area for the sergeants. The Haganah, which was still involved in the "Little Saison", also conducted searches for the sergeants. At the same time, the Jewish authorities requested that the lives of the three condemned Irgun members be spared. The sergeants were kept in a bunker underneath a diamond factory which the security forces failed to find despite searching the factory twice.

Throughout July, the Irgun and Lehi launched a massive number of attacks, while the Haganah also carried out actions against the British, with the Palmach attacking the radar station on Mount Carmel and sabotaging the British transport ship Empire Lifeguard in Cyprus. In the final two weeks of July, over 100 attacks took place in which the security forces lost 13 dead and 77 wounded with only one Jewish insurgent killed.

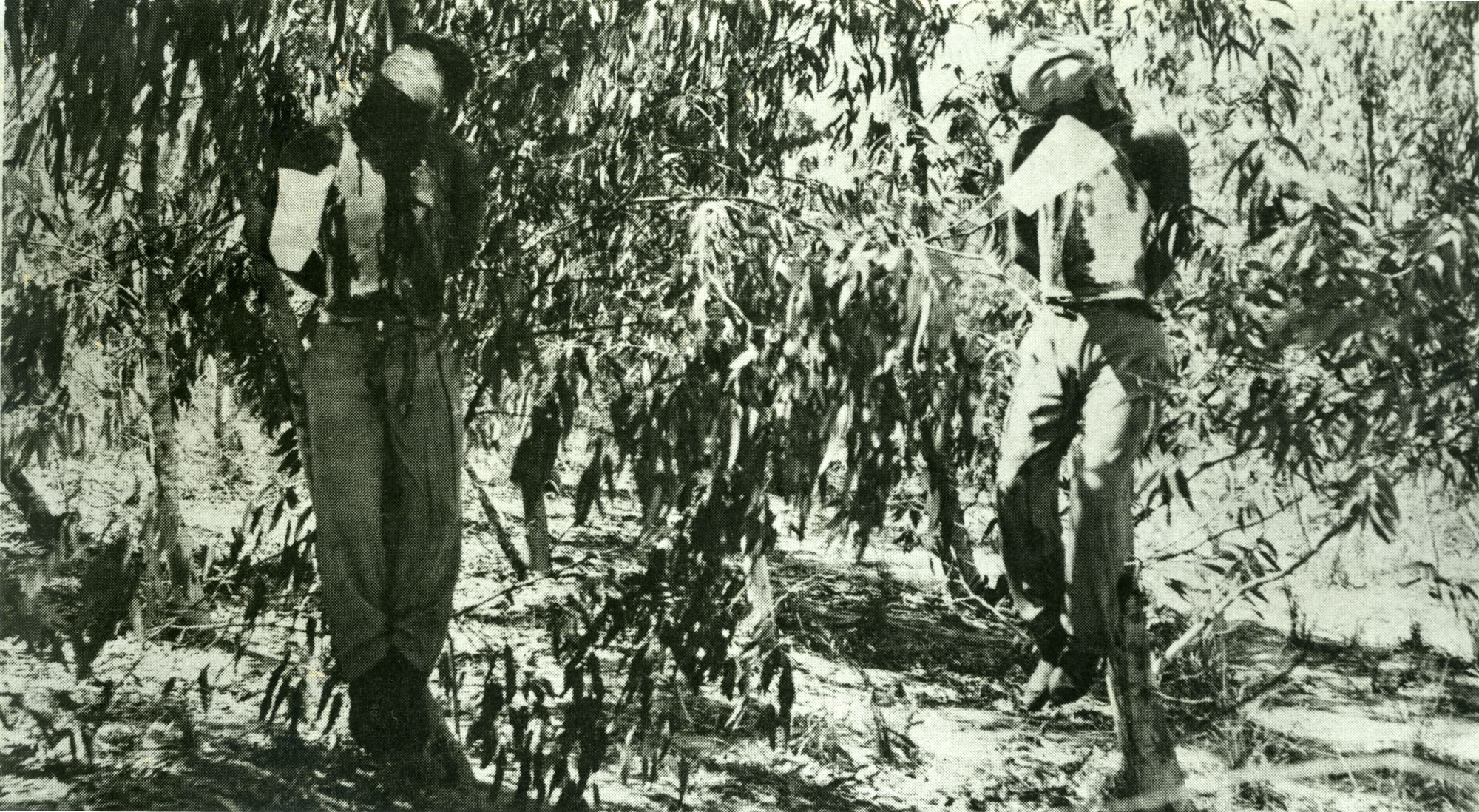
The bodies of the hanged British sergeants as they were found

On July 29, the British authorities executed Haviv, Nakar, and Weiss in Acre Prison. In what became known as the Sergeants affair, the Irgun retaliated by killing Martin and Paice and hanging their bodies in a eucalyptus grove in Netanya. The bodies were booby-trapped with an explosive mine which exploded as Martin's body was being cut down, injuring a British officer. The incident caused widespread outrage among the security forces in Palestine and the British public and government. British police rampaged in Tel Aviv, killing five Jewish civilians and wounding 15. Antisemitic rioting broke out in Britain in response to the killings. The British reacted by arresting 35 Jewish political leaders including the mayors of Tel Aviv, Netanya, and Ramat Gan and held them without trial, the Revisionist Zionist youth movement Betar was banned and its headquarters was raided, and the army was authorised to punitively demolish Jewish homes, with a Jewish home in Jerusalem demolished on August 5 after an arms cache was discovered there during a routine search.

The sergeants' hangings have been widely seen as a turning point which finally broke British will to remain in Palestine. The consensus gradually formed in Britain that it was time to leave Palestine. Meanwhile, the Irgun launched a new wave of attacks on the railway system and an Irgun member was killed in an attack on an RAF billet in Jerusalem. Three British policemen were killed when the Irgun bombed the Jerusalem Labor Department building on August 5. Throughout August, with widespread outrage among British soldiers as a result of the hangings of the sergeants, Jewish civilians were repeatedly shot at by British troops. A Jewish man in Rishon LeZion was killed when British troops fired on a group of men at an outdoor soft drink stand and shot at Jewish police called in to investigate before escaping, and a nine-year-old child was killed by indiscriminate gunfire in a Jewish settlement in the Shomron. Despite this, the conflict began to taper off as clashes between Jews and Arabs picked up.

=== Final phase of the insurgency ===
In September 1947, the British cabinet decided to evacuate Palestine. Although some shooting and bombing attacks took place from September to the end of November which killed a number of soldiers and policemen, including an Irgun bombing of police headquarters in Haifa which drew attention due to the technical sophistication involved. At the end of October renewed Haganah–Irgun clashes broke out during which the Haganah shot two Irgun men in Rishon LeZion, but the clashes died out. Five Lehi members including three female members were also killed in a raid on a Lehi safehouse in Raanana, which provoked reprisal killings of British soldiers, police, and civilians by Lehi.

On November 29, 1947, the United Nations recommended partitioning Palestine into Jewish and Arab states as per the United Nations Partition Plan for Palestine in UN General Assembly Resolution 181. Almost immediately, the Mandate collapsed into civil war between the Jewish and Arab populations. The insurgency against the British continued, although the Haganah, Irgun, and Lehi focused on fighting the Arabs. One notable incident during this time was the Cairo–Haifa train bombings, which killed 28 British soldiers.

The British Mandate ended on May 15, 1948, with the State of Israel declaring its independence on the previous day, which was followed by the outbreak of the 1948 Arab–Israeli War between Israel and its neighbouring Arab states.

=== Propaganda campaign ===
The insurgency was coupled with a local and international propaganda campaign to gain sympathy abroad. The Yishuv authorities publicised the plight of Holocaust survivors and British attempts to stop them from migrating to Palestine, hoping to generate negative publicity against Britain around the world. Ben-Gurion publicly stated that the Jewish insurgency was "nourished by despair", that Britain had "proclaimed war against Zionism", and that British policy was "to liquidate the Jews as a people." Of particular significance was the British interceptions of the blockade runners carrying Jewish immigrants. The SS Exodus incident in particular became a major media event. Propaganda against the British over their treatment of the refugees was disseminated around the world, including claims that the Exodus was a "floating Auschwitz". In one incident, after a baby died at sea aboard an Aliyah Bet ship, the body was publicly displayed to the press after the ship docked in Haifa for transfer of the passengers to Cyprus, and journalists were told that "the dirty Nazi-British assassins suffocated this innocent victim with gas."

Through a well-organised international propaganda campaign, Irgun and Lehi reached out to potential international supporters, particularly in the United States and especially among American Jews, who became increasingly sympathetic to the Zionist cause and hostile to Britain. Their propaganda claimed that: Britain's restrictions on Jewish immigration were a violation of international law, as it violated the terms of the mandate; British rule in Palestine was oppressive and had turned the country into a police state; British policies were Nazi-like and anti-Semitic; the insurgency was Jewish self-defence; and the insurgents were winning and British withdrawal from Palestine was inevitable. This propaganda, coupled with statements and actions by British officials and members of the security forces interpreted as anti-Semitic, gained the insurgents international credibility and served to further tarnish Britain's image.

Britain was at this time negotiating a loan from the United States vital to its economic survival. Its treatment of Jewish survivors generated bad publicity and encouraged the U.S. Congress to stiffen its terms. Many American Jews were initially politically active in pressing Congress for a suspension of the loan guarantees, but Jewish groups and politicians later retracted their support and came out in favour of the loan, fearing accusations of disloyalty to the United States. U.S. President Harry S. Truman put extensive pressure on the British government over its handling of the Palestine situation. The post-war conflict in Palestine caused more damage to Anglo-American relations than any other issue.

=== The British decide to leave Palestine ===
From October 1946, opposition leader, Winston Churchill, began calling for Palestine to be given to the United Nations.

During the insurgency, the British government organised a conference in London between Zionist and Arab representatives and attempted to mediate a solution. However, these talks proved fruitless. The Arabs were unwilling to accept any solution except a unified Palestine under Arab rule, and while the Zionists adamantly refused this proposal, instead suggesting partition. After realising that the Arabs and the Jews were both unwilling to compromise, Bevin began considering turning the Palestine question over to the United Nations.

Britain increasingly began to see its attempts to suppress the Jewish insurgency as a costly and futile exercise, and its resolve began to weaken. British security forces, which were constantly taking casualties, were unable to suppress the insurgents due to their hit-and-run tactics, poor intelligence, and a non-cooperative civilian population. The insurgents were also making the country ungovernable; the King David Hotel bombing resulted in the deaths of a large number of civil servants and the loss of many documents, devastating the mandatory administration, while IED attacks on British vehicles began to limit the British Army's freedom of movement throughout the country. The Acre Prison break and the floggings and hangings of British soldiers by the Irgun humiliated the British authorities and further demonstrated their failure to control the situation. At the same time, attacks carried out on economic targets cost Britain almost £2 million in economic damage; meanwhile, Britain was paying about £40 million a year to keep its troops in Palestine, while at the same time the country was going through a deep economic crisis as a result of World War II, with widespread power cuts and strict rationing, and was heavily dependent on American economic aid. There were also indications, such as several successful bombings in London and the letter-bombing campaign against British politicians, that the insurgents were beginning to take the war home to Britain. In addition, British treatment of Holocaust survivors and tactics in Palestine were earning Britain bad publicity around the world, particularly in the United States, and earned the British government constant diplomatic harassment from the Truman administration.

In January 1947, all non-essential British civilians were evacuated from Palestine. On February 14, 1947, British Foreign Secretary Ernest Bevin informed the House of Commons that the Palestine question would be referred to the United Nations. Meanwhile, depending on perspective, a low-level guerrilla war, or campaigns of terrorism, continued through 1947 and 1948. Eventually, Jewish insurgency against the British was overshadowed by the Jewish-Arab fighting of the 1947–48 Civil War in Mandatory Palestine, which started following the UN vote in favour of the United Nations Partition Plan.

In 1947, the United States chapter of the United Jewish Appeal raised $150 million in its annual appeal – at that time the largest sum of money ever raised by a charity dependent on private contributions. Half was earmarked for Palestine. The Times reported that Palestine brought more dollars into the sterling zone than any other country, save Britain.

In April 1947 the issue was formally referred to the UN. By this time over 100,000 British soldiers were stationed in Palestine. Referral to the UN led to a period of uncertainty over Palestine's future. A United Nations committee, the United Nations Special Committee on Palestine (UNSCOP) was sent to investigate the problem. On August 31, 1947, UNSCOP recommended that Palestine be partitioned into Jewish and Arab states. On September 20, 1947, the British cabinet voted to evacuate Palestine.

Although the insurgency played a major role in persuading the British to quit Palestine, other factors also influenced British policy. Britain, facing a deep economic crisis and heavily dependent on the United States, was facing a massive financial burden over its many colonies, military bases, and commitments abroad. At the same time, Britain had also lost the centerpiece of the rationale of its Middle East policy after the end of the British Raj in Colonial India. Britain's Middle East policy had been centered around protecting the flanks of its sea lines of communication to India. After the British Raj ended, Britain no longer needed Palestine. Finally, Britain still had alternative locations such as Egypt, Libya, and Kenya to base its troops.

=== Partition and civil war ===
The United Nations Special Committee on Palestine recommended partition, and on 29 November 1947 the United Nations General Assembly voted to recommend the partition of Palestine into two states – an Arab and a Jewish one. The partition resolution (181) intended administration of Palestine to be in the hands of five UN representatives and assumed free Jewish immigration into the Jewish area even before the creation of a Jewish state:

The mandatory power shall use its best endeavours to ensure that an area situated in the territory of the Jewish state, including a seaport and hinterland adequate to provide facilities for a substantial immigration, shall be evacuated at the earliest possible date and in any event not later than 1 February 1948.

Britain refused to comply with these conditions on the grounds that the decision was unacceptable to the Arabs. It neither allowed Jewish immigration outside the monthly quota, nor granted control to the UN representatives (who became known as the "five lonely pilgrims"). A statement issued by the British Ambassador to the UN stated that the inmates on Cyprus would be released with the termination of the mandate. The British also refused to cooperate with the UN commission that was sent to monitor the transition; when the commission's six members arrived in Palestine in January 1948, British High Commissioner Alan Cunningham allotted them an unventilated Jerusalem basement from which to work out of. They were gradually reduced to foraging for food and drink and prevented from carrying out their duties.

Over the remaining period of British rule, British policy was to ensure that the Arabs did not resist Britain or blame it for partition. Convinced that partition was unworkable, the British refused to assist the UN in any way that might require British forces to remain on Palestinian soil (to implement it) or turn their army into a target for Arab forces. On the other side, "The Yishuv perceived the peril of an Arab invasion as threatening its very existence. Having no real knowledge of the Arabs' true military capabilities, the Jews took Arab propaganda literally, preparing for the worst and reacting accordingly."

As the British began to withdraw during the closing months of the mandate, civil war erupted in Palestine between the Jews and Arabs. During this period, as well as restricting Jewish immigration, Britain handed over strategic military and police positions to the Arabs as they abandoned them and froze Jewish Agency assets in London banks. However, the British generally stayed out of the fighting and only intervened occasionally. Even so, they were still sometimes caught in the crossfire or deliberately attacked for their weapons. There is little evidence that Bevin, despite his hostility to Zionism, wanted to strangle the incipient Jewish state at birth. Instead, his main concern seems to have been to ensure that Egypt retained control of the parts of the Negev they were occupying, so that Britain had a land link between Egypt and Jordan.

On 22 February 1948, as part of the civil war, Arab militants detonated a truck laden with explosives in Ben Yehuda Street in Jerusalem, killing about 60 people. Two British deserters assisted in this attack; Eddie Brown, a police captain who claimed that his brother had been killed by the Irgun, and Peter Madison, an army corporal. They had been recruited by Holy War Army commander Abd al-Qadir al-Husayni. In revenge, Lehi mined two trains. The first such attack, which took place on 29 February, hit the military coaches of a passenger train north of Rehovot, killing 28 British soldiers and wounding 35. Another attack on 31 March killed 40 people and injured 60. Although there were soldiers on board, all of the casualties were civilians.

The Haganah had previously spared the railway bridge at Rosh HaNikra during their 1946 Night of the Bridges operation. Following the late-1947 announcement that the British would withdraw from Palestine months ahead of schedule, however, the bridge was destroyed by the 21st Battalion under the Palmach in late February 1948 to hinder Lebanese arms shipments to Arab forces opposing the UN Partition Plan. As repairs were prohibitively expensive, the tunnels were later completely sealed. This ended the only connection between the European and North African standard gauge railway networks.

In April 1948, the Security Council called upon all governments to prevent fighting personnel or arms from entering Palestine.

Afrer five and a half months of civil war in Palestine, Jewish forces, led by the Haganah, consolidated their hold on a strip of territory on the coastal plain of Palestine and the Jezreel and Jordan Valleys, crushed the Palestinian Arab militias, and Palestinian society effectively collapsed.

== Aftermath: British policy during the 1948 War ==
As all the League of Nations mandates were to be taken over by the new United Nations, Britain had declared that it would leave Palestine by 1 August 1948, later setting the date for the termination of the mandate as 15 May; on 14 May 1948 the Zionist leadership announced the Israeli Declaration of Independence. Several hours later, at midnight on 15 May 1948, the British Mandate of Palestine officially expired and the State of Israel came into being.

Hours after the end of the Mandate, contingents of the armies of four surrounding Arab states entered Palestine, setting off the 1948 Arab–Israeli War. As the war progressed, the Israeli forces gained an advantage due to a growing stream of arms and military equipment from Europe that had been clandestinely smuggled or were supplied by Czechoslovakia. In the following months, Israel began to expand the territory under its control.

Throughout the 1948 war, 40 British officers served with the Jordanian Army (then known as the Arab Legion), and the Arab Legion's commander was a British General, John Bagot Glubb.

On 28 May 1948, the United Nations Security Council debated Palestine. The British proposed that the entry of arms and men of military age into Palestine should be restricted. At the request of the United States, the ban was extended to the whole region. A French amendment allowed immigration so long as soldiers were not recruited from immigrants.

The British had by this time released almost all inmates of the Cyprus internment camps, but continued to hold about 11,000 detainees, mainly military-age males, in the camps. Authorities in the British, as well as American occupation zones in Germany and Austria imposed restrictions on the emigration on males of military age to Israel during the war.

In October 1948, Israel began a campaign to capture the Negev. In December 1948, Israeli troops made a twenty-mile incursion into Egyptian territory. Under the terms of the Anglo-Egyptian treaty the Egyptians could appeal for British help in the event of an Israeli invasion, however the Egyptians were concerned to avoid any such eventuality. During this period, the Royal Air Force began mounting almost daily reconnaissance missions over Israel and the Sinai, with RAF planes taking off from Egyptian airbases and sometimes flying alongside EAF warplanes. On 20 November 1948, the Israeli Air Force shot down a British reconnaissance plane over Israel, killing two airmen.

On 7 January 1949, Israeli forces shot down five British fighter planes after a flight of RAF planes overflew an Israeli convoy in the Sinai and were mistaken for Egyptian aircraft. Two pilots were killed and one was captured by Israeli troops and briefly detained in Israel. The UK Defence Committee responded to this incident and a Jordanian request by sending two destroyers carrying men and arms to Transjordan. Israel complained to the UN that these troops were in violation of United Nations Security Council Resolution 50. Britain denied this, claiming the resolution did not apply to Britain and that the troops were not new to the region as they had been transferred from Egypt. The British also managed to prevent shipments of aviation spirit and other essential fuels from reaching Israel in retaliation.

As the IDF drove into the Negev, the British government launched a diplomatic campaign to prevent Israel from capturing the entire area. Britain viewed the Negev as a strategic land bridge between Egypt and Transjordan that was vital to both British and Western interests in the Middle East, and were anxious to keep it from falling into Israeli hands. On 19 October 1948, Sir Alexander Cadogan, the British representative to the United Nations, pressed for sanctions against Israel. The British believed that it would be in their and the West's strategic interest if they maintained de facto control of a land bridge from Egypt to Transjordan, and Foreign Secretary Ernest Bevin tried to persuade the US government to support his position and force Israel to withdraw. In particular, Bevin hoped to restrict Israel's southern border to the Gaza–Jericho–Beersheba road. The British ambassador in Cairo, Sir Ronald Campbell, advocated military intervention against Israel to stop the IDF's drive into the Negev in a January 1949 cable to Bevin. However, the British diplomatic campaign failed to persuade the US government to take action against Israel, with US President Harry S. Truman referring to the Negev as "a small area not worth differing over". Mounting international and domestic criticism forced an end to Britain's attempts to intervene in the war, and Bevin ordered British forces to stay clear of the Israelis in the Negev.

The British cabinet ultimately decided that action could be taken to defend Transjordan, but that under no circumstances would British troops enter Palestine.

On 17 January 1949 the Chief of Staff briefed the cabinet on events in the Middle East. Minister of Health, Aneurin Bevan, protested at the decision to send arms to Transjordan, taken by the Defence Committee without cabinet approval. He complained that British policy in Palestine was inconsistent with the spirit and tradition of Labour Party policy and was supported by the Deputy Prime Minister, Herbert Morrison and Chancellor of the Exchequer, Stafford Cripps.

In January 1949, the British cabinet voted to continue supporting the Arab states, but also voted to recognise Israel and release the last Jewish detainees on Cyprus. The last detainees began leaving Cyprus in January, and shortly afterward, Britain formally recognised Israel.

== Casualties ==
The National Army Museum estimates around 750 British soldiers and police officers were killed in the insurgency while the Soldiers of Oxfordshire Museum states that 784 British soldiers and civilians were killed. According to military historian David A. Charters, the following casualties sustained from August 1945 to August 1947, as recorded by British authorities, is shown below:

| | Killed | Wounded | Total |
|---|---|---|---|
| British | 141 | 475 | 616 |
| Jewish insurgents | 40 | 23 | 63 |
| Jewish others | 25 | 115 | 140 |
| Arabs | 44 | 287 | 331 |
| Others | 10 | 12 | 22 |
| Totals | 260 | 912 | 1172 |

== Timeline ==
Chronological timeline of insurgent activities (1939–1948)

=== 1939 ===
- June 12 – A British explosives expert was killed trying to defuse an Irgun bomb near a Jerusalem post office.
- August 26 – Two British police officers, Inspector Ronald Barker and Inspector Ralph Cairns, commander of the Jewish Department of the C.I.D., were killed by an Irgun mine in Jerusalem.

=== 1944 ===
- February 12 – British immigration offices in Jerusalem, Tel Aviv, and Haifa were attacked by Irgun.
- February 14 – Two British constables were shot dead when they attempted to arrest Lehi fighters pasting up wall posters in Haifa.
- February 18 – A police patrol shot and killed a Jewish civilian who had not replied swiftly enough to its challenge.
- February 24 – A British police official and four CID officers were wounded in bombings.
- February 27 – Simultaneous bombing attacks were launched against British income tax offices.
- March 2 – A British constable was shot and severely wounded after coming upon Irgun fighters putting up a poster.
- March 13 – Lehi killed a Jewish CID officer in Ramat Gan.
- March 19 – A Lehi member was shot dead while resisting arrest by the CID in Tel Aviv. Lehi retaliated with an attack in Tel Aviv that killed two police officers and wounded one.
- March 23 – Irgun fighters led by Rahamim Cohen raided and bombed the British intelligence offices and placed explosives. A British soldier and Irgun fighter were killed. An Irgun unit led by Amichai Paglin raided the British intelligence headquarters in Jaffa, and Irgun fighters led by Yaakov Hillel raided the British intelligence offices in Haifa.
- April 1 – A British constable was killed and another wounded.
- July 13 – Irgun fighters broke into and bombed the British intelligence building on Mamilla street in Jerusalem.
- September 29 – A senior British police officer of the Criminal Intelligence Department was assassinated by Irgun in Jerusalem.
- November 6 – Lehi fighters Eliyahu Bet-Zuri and Eliyahu Hakim assassinated British politician Lord Moyne in Cairo. Moyne's driver was also killed.
- November 1944 to February 1945 – the "Hunting Season": the Haganah actively cooperates with the Mandate authorities in the suppression of the Irgun

=== 1945 ===
- January 27 – A British judge was kidnapped by Irgun and released in exchange for Jewish detainees.
- February/March – end of the so-called "Hunting Season", the Haganah cooperation with the authorities against the Irgun.
- March 22 – Lehi members Eliyahu Bet-Zuri and Eliyahu Hakim were hanged in Cairo.
- August 14 – Irgun fighters overpowered and disarmed two British sentries, and then blew up the Yibne Railway Bridge.
- October – The Jewish Resistance Movement, a cooperation between the Haganah, Irgun, and Lehi is activated by the Jewish Agency until August 1946
- October 10 – Haganah fighters raid the Atlit detainee camp, which was being used by the British to hold thousands of illegal Jewish immigrants from Europe, freeing 208 inmates. The raid was planned by Yitzhak Rabin, commanded by Nahum Sarig, and executed by the Palmach.
- November 1 – Night of the Trains – Haganah fighters sabotaged railroads used by the British, and sank three British guard boats. At the same time, an Irgun unit led by Eitan Livni raided a train station in Lod, destroying a number of buildings and three train engines. One Irgun fighter, two British soldiers, and four Arabs were killed.
- December 27 – Irgun fighters raided and bombed British Intelligence Offices in Jerusalem, killing seven British policemen. Two Irgun fighters were also killed. Irgun also attacked a British Army camp in Northern Tel Aviv. In the exchange of fire, a British soldier and Irgun fighter were killed, and five Irgun fighters were injured.

=== 1946 ===
- January 19 – Jewish fighters destroyed a power station and a portion of the Central Jerusalem Prison with explosives. During the incident, two insurgents were killed and one wounded and captured and a British officer was killed in a firefight.
- January 20 – Palmach attacked the Givat Olga Coast Guard Station. One person was killed and ten were injured during the raid. A Palmach attempt to sabotage the British radar station on Mount Carmel was thwarted. Documents seized by the British indicated that the attacks were retaliation for the seizure of a Jewish immigrant ship two days before.
- February 22 – Haganah fighters attacked a police Tegart fort with a 200 lb bomb.
- February 23 – Haganah fighters attacked British mobile police forces in Kfar Vitkin, Shfar'am and Sharona. In the firefight that followed, four Haganah members were killed.
- February 26 – Irgun and Lehi fighters attacked three British airfields and destroyed dozens of aircraft. One Irgun fighter was killed.
- March 6 – A military truck carrying 30 Irgun fighters disguised as British soldiers approached a British army camp at Sarafand, where the fighters infiltrated into the armoury and stole weaponry. An exchange fire began after the fighters were discovered. The remaining weapons and ammunition in the armoury were destroyed by a mine, and the truck then drove off at high speed. Four Irgun fighters were captured, two of them women. Two of the captured fighters were wounded.
- March 25 – A Palmach squad attempting to cover the arrival of the Jewish immigrant ship Wingate, which was interceptd by the British, encountered a British tank unit. Palmach member Bracha Fuld was killed in the subsequent exchange of fire.
- April 2 – Irgun launched a sabotage operation against the railway network in the south, inflicting severe damage. The retreating fighters were surrounded after being spotted by a British reconnaissance aircraft. Two British policemen were killed, and three British soldiers were wounded. Two Irgun fighters were killed, four wounded, and 31 arrested.
- April 23 – Dozens of Irgun fighters disguised as British soldiers and Arab prisoners infiltrated the Ramat Gan police station, then ordered the policemen into the detention cell at gunpoint, blasted open the door to the armoury and looted it. Irgun porters loaded the weapons onto a waiting truck. A British policeman on the upper story shot dead the Irgun Bren gunner covering the raid from a balcony on the building opposite the police station, then fired at the porters, who continued to load weapons under fire. One Irgun member was killed as he ran to the truck, and Irgun commander Dov Gruner was wounded and subsequently captured by the British. After the weapons had been loaded, the truck drove off to an orange grove near Ramat Gan.
- April 25 – Lehi fighters attacked a Tel Aviv car park that was being used by the British Army's 6th Airborne Division, killing seven British soldiers and looting the arms racks they found. They then laid mines and retreated. Some British soldiers retaliated by damaging Jewish property.
- June 16–17 – Night of the Bridges – Palmach carried out a sabotage operation, blowing up ten of the eleven bridges connecting British Mandatory Palestine to the neighbouring countries, while staging 50 diversion ambushes and operations against British forces throughout Palestine. Palmach lost 14 dead and 5 wounded in the operation. The British responded with raids on Kfar Giladi, Matsuba, and Bet HaArava, encountering only minor resistance. Three Jews were killed, 18 wounded, and 100 detained.
- June 17 – Lehi attacked railroad workshops in Haifa. Eleven Lehi members were killed during the attack.
- June 18 – Irgun fighters took six British officers hostage. They were later released after the death sentences passed on two Irgun fighters were commuted.
- June 20 – British troops searching for the six officers abducted on June 18 killed two Jewish militants.
- June 29 – Operation Agatha – British military and police units began a three-day operation, searching three cities and Jewish settlements throughout Palestine and imposing curfews, arresting 2,718 Jews and seizing numerous arms and munitions which were found unexpectedly. The Jewish Agency building was raided, and numerous documents were confiscated. During the operation, four Jews were killed and 80 injured.
- July 22 – King David Hotel bombing – Irgun fighters bombed the King David Hotel in Jerusalem, which was home to the central offices of the British Mandatory authorities and the headquarters of British forces in Palestine and Transjordan. A total of 91 people were killed, including 28 British soldiers, policemen and civilians. Most of the dead were Arabs. Another 46 people were injured. Irgun suffered two casualties when British soldiers became suspicious and fired at a group of Irgun fighters as they fled from the scene, wounding two. One of them later died from his injuries.
- July 29 – British police raided a bomb-making workshop in Tel Aviv.
- July 30 – Operation Shark - Tel Aviv was placed under a 22-hour curfew for four days as 20,000 British soldiers conducted house-to-house searches for Jewish militants. The city was sealed off and troops were ordered to shoot curfew violators. British troops detained 500 people for further questioning and seized a large cache of weapons, extensive counterfeiting equipment, as well as $1,000,000 in counterfeit government bonds that was discovered in a raid on the city's largest synagogue.
- August – The Haganah ceased its cooperation with the Irgun, and Lehi (the "Jewish Resistance Movement")
- August 13 – A crowd of about 1,000 Jews attempted to break into the port area of Haifa as two Royal Navy ships departed for Cyprus with 1,300 illegal immigrants on board, and a ship with 600 more was escorted into the port. British soldiers fired on the crowd, killing three and wounding seven.
- August 22 – Palyam frogmen attached a limpet mine to the side of the British cargo ship Empire Rival, which had been used to deport Jewish immigrants to Cyprus. A hole was blown in the ship's side.
- August 26 – British troops searched two Jewish coastal villages for three Jews involved in the Empire Rival incident. During the operation, 85 persons, including the entire male population of one of the villages, were detained.
- August 30 – British soldiers discovered arms and munitions dumps in Dorot and Ruhama.
- September 8 – Jewish fighters sabotaged railroads in fifty places in Palestine.
- September 9 – Two British officers were killed by an explosion at a public building in Tel Aviv. A British police sergeant, T.G. Martin, who had identified and arrested Lehi leader and future Israeli Prime Minister Yitzhak Shamir, was assassinated near his Haifa home.
- September 10 – British forces imposed a curfew and searched for militants in Tel Aviv and Ramat Gan, arresting 101 people and wounding four.
- September 15 – Jewish fighters attacked a police station on the coast near Tel Aviv, but were driven off by gunfire.
- September 20 - Bombed Haifa Station
- October 6 – A member of the Royal Air Force was shot and killed.
- October 8 – Two British soldiers were killed when their truck detonated a mine outside Jerusalem. A leading Arab figure was wounded in another mine attack, and mines were also found near government house.
- October 30 – Irgun launched an attack on the Jerusalem Railway Station, killing a police sapper and causing heavy damage. One of the attackers, Meir Feinstein, was captured.
- October 31 – The British embassy in Rome was damaged by an Irgun bomb.
- November 1–2 – Palmach sank three British naval police craft.
- November 9–13 – Jewish underground members launched a series of land mine and suitcase bomb attacks against railroad stations, trains, and streetcars, killing 11 British soldiers and policemen and 8 Arab constables.
- November 17 – Three British policemen and a Royal Air Force sergeant were killed when their truck hit a mine near Lydda.
- November 18 – British police in Tel Aviv attacked Jews on the streets and fired into houses in retaliation for the mine attack that occurred the previous day. Twenty Jews were injured. Meanwhile, a British engineer trying to remove mines planted near an RAF airfield was killed and four other men were injured when one of the mines exploded.
- November 20 – Three people were injured when a bomb exploded in the Jerusalem tax office.
- November 25 – The Jewish immigrant ship Knesset Israel was captured by four British destroyers. Efforts to force the Jewish refugees onto deportation ships were met with resistance. Two refugees were killed and 46 wounded. Haganah attacked the Givat Olga police station and the Sydna-Ali coastal patrol station, wounding six British and eight Arab policemen.
- November 26 – The British launched a massive search operation and established a 1,000-man cordon on the Plain of Sharon and in Samaria, looking for the perpetrators of the previous days attacks and illegal weapons. Jewish settlers put up violent resistance to the soldiers. The British reported 65 soldiers and 16 policemen wounded, while the Jews had 8 dead and 75 wounded.
- October 8 – Two British soldiers were killed and three wounded when their truck hit a mine.
- October 31 – The British embassy in Rome was bombed by the Irgun, wounding three.
- December 2–5 – Six British soldiers and four other persons were killed in bomb and mine attacks.
- December 28 – An Irgun prisoner who had been sentenced to 18 years in prison and 18 lashes was whipped.
- December 29 – Night of the Beatings – Irgun fighters kidnapped and flogged six British soldiers. The British responded by ordering their soldiers back into army camps and setting up roadblocks. A car with five armed Irgun men carrying a whip was stopped. British soldiers opened fire, killing one Irgun fighter. The remaining four were arrested.

=== 1947 ===
- January 2 – A British soldier was killed when the Bren gun carrier he was riding was hit by a mine. The Irgun also launched a flamethrower attack against a military car park in Tiberias.
- January 8 - Twelve Irgun members were arrested in Rishon LeZion.
- January 5 – Eleven British soldiers were injured in a grenade attack on a train in Banha carrying British troops to Palestine from Egypt.
- January 12 – A Lehi member drove a truck bomb into a police station in Haifa, killing two British and two Arab constables, and wounding 140.
- January 26 – A retired British major, H. Collins, was abducted in Jerusalem, badly beaten, and chloroformed. A British judge was kidnapped the following day. Both men were released when British High Commissioner Alan Cunningham threatened martial law unless the two men were returned unharmed. Collins subsequently died from chloroform poisoning, as the chloroform had been improperly administered by his captors.
- March 1 – Irgun bombed the Officers Club on King George Street in Jerusalem, killing 17 British officers and wounding 27, resulting in martial law that lasted 16 days. Immediately after martial law was declared, two Jews were shot and killed, one of them a four-year-old girl standing on the balcony of her home. During the period of martial law, 78 Jews suspected of membership in the Jewish resistance were arrested.
- March 2 – Three British soldiers were killed by a landmine disguised as a stone that detonated as their vehicle was passing on Mount Carmel.
- March 3 – A mine blew up a British scout car near Tel Aviv, killing three soldiers and injuring one.
- March 4 – Five British soldiers were injured when their truck was wrecked by a mine near Rishon LeZion, and four Arabs were injured when a Royal Air Force vehicle was blown up by a mine near Ramla. A British military office in Haifa was bombed, and a small-scale raid hit an army camp near Hadera.
- March 9 – A British Army camp was attacked in Hadera.
- March 11 – Two British soldiers were killed.
- March 12 – Irgun attacked the Schneller Camp, which was being used as a barracks and office of the Royal Army Pay Corps. One British soldier was killed and eight were wounded. A British camp near Karkur was also raided, shots were fired at the Sarona camp, and a mine exploded near Rishon LeZion.
- March 23 – One British soldier was killed when a train on the Cairo-Haifa line hit a mine in Rehovot.
- March 29 – A British officer was killed when Jewish fighters ambushed a British cavalry party near Ramla.
- April 2 – The Ocean Vigour, a British freighter used to transport captured illegal immigrants to Cyprus, was damaged in a bomb attack by Palyam, the naval force of the Palmach.
- April 3 – A British military truck was damaged and blown off the road by a mine in Haifa, injuring two soldiers of the 6th Airborne Division. The British transport ship Empire Rival was damaged by a time-bomb while en route from Haifa to Port Said.
- April 7 – A British patrol killed Jewish militant Moshe Cohen.
- April 8 – A British constable was killed in retaliation for Cohen's death. A Jewish boy was also killed by British troops.
- April 13 – The Jewish immigrant ship Theodor Herzl was captured by the British. Three Jewish refugees were killed and 27 injured during the takeover.
- April 14 – The Royal Navy captured the Jewish immigrant ship Guardian. Two Jews were killed and 14 wounded during the takeover.
- April 17 – The British Army leave centre in Netanya was attacked by three Jewish fighters who shot a sentry dead, tossed three bombs and then escaped.
- April 19 – Four Irgun fighters (Dov Gruner, Yehiel Dresner, Mordechai Alkahi and Eliezer Kashani) were hanged by British authorities. Irgun retaliated with three attacks; a British soldier was killed during a raid on a field dressing station near Netanya, a civilian bystander was killed during an attack on a British armoured car in Tel Aviv, and shots were fired at British troops in Haifa.
- April 21 – Irgun member Meir Feinstein and Lehi member Moshe Barzani killed themselves in prison with grenades smuggled to them in hollowed-out oranges, hours before they were to be hanged.
- April 22 – A British troop train arriving from Cairo was bombed outside Rehovot, killing five soldiers and three civilians, and wounding 39. In a separate incident, two British soldiers were killed in Jerusalem.
- April 25 – Lehi bombed a British police compound, killing four policemen.
- April 26 – A British police official was assassinated.
- May 4 – Acre Prison break – Irgun members working with Jewish prisoners inside Acre Prison managed to blow a hole in the wall, and assault the prison, freeing 28 Jewish prisoners. Nine Irgun and Lehi fighters, including commander Dov Cohen, were killed during the retreat. Five Irgun fighters and eight escapees were later captured.
- May 6 – A British counter-terrorism unit led by Roy Farran abducted 17-year-old Lehi member Alexander Rubowitz, later torturing and killing him.
- May 12 – Two British policemen were killed by Jewish fighters in Jerusalem.
- May 15 – Two British soldiers were killed and seven injured by Lehi. A British policeman was also killed in an ambush.
- May 16 – A British constable and a Jewish police superintendent were assassinated.
- June 4 – Eight Lehi letter bombs addressed to high British government officials, including Prime Minister Clement Attlee, were discovered in London. A British soldier was killed in Haifa.
- June 28 – Lehi fighters opened fire on a line of British soldiers waiting in line outside a Tel Aviv theater, killing three soldiers and wounding two. One Briton was also killed and several wounded in a Haifa hotel. A Jewish fighter was also wounded.
- June 29 – Four British soldiers were wounded in a Lehi attack at a Herzliya beach.
- July 17 – Irgun carried out five mining operations against British military traffic in the vicinity of Netanya, killing one Briton and wounding sixteen.
- July 16 – A British soldier was killed by a vehicle mine near Petah Tikva.
- July 18 – A British soldier was killed.
- July 19 – Irgun attacked four locations in Haifa, killing a British constable and wounding twelve. A British soldier was also killed.
- July 20 – A British soldier was killed.
- July 21 – A Haganah raid knocked out a British radar station in Haifa that was being used to track Aliyah Bet ships. Elsewhere, mortar shells were fired at the headquarters of the British 1st Infantry Division in Tel Litwinsky, a British staff car near Netanya was fired on, and a British soldier was killed when his truck hit a mine near Ra'anana.
- July 25 – A British soldier was killed and three others were injured when their jeep hit a mine near Netanya. Jewish fighters also blew up railway track near Gaza and damaged a railway bridge near Binyamina.
- July 26 – Two British soldiers were killed by a booby trap.
- July 27 – Seven British soldiers were wounded in an ambush and mine explosions.
- July 29–31 – The Sergeants affair – British authorities hanged Irgun fighters Avshalom Haviv, Yaakov Weiss and Meir Nakar. In retaliation, Irgun hanged British intelligence corps sergeants Mervyn Paice and Clifford Martin, who had previously been abducted and held as hostages, afterwards re-hanging their bodies from trees in a eucalyptus grove near Netanya. A mine laid underneath exploded as one of the bodies was being cut down, injuring a British officer. In a separate incident, two British soldiers were killed and three wounded by a land mine near Hadera planted by Irgun fighters. British soldiers and policemen reacted by rampaging in Tel Aviv, breaking windows, overturning cars, stealing a taxi and assaulting civilians. Groups of young Jews then began stoning British foot patrols, causing them to be withdrawn from the city. Upon learning of the stonings, members of mobile police units drove to Tel Aviv in six armored cars, where they smashed windows, raided two cafes and detonated a grenade in the second one, and fired into two crowded buses. Five Jews were killed and fifteen wounded.
- August 1 – An anti-British riot broke out during the funeral procession of the five Jews killed the day before, and 33 Jews were injured. In Jerusalem, an attack by Jewish fighters on a British security zone in Rehavia was repulsed. One attacker was killed and two captured.
- August 5 – Three British police officers were killed by a bomb at the Jerusalem Department of Labor building.
- August 9 – Irgun bombed a British troop train north of Lydda, killing the Jewish engineer.
- August 15 - 2 Arabs (including 13-year-old boy) killed in Jaffa, 1 Jew killed in Kfar Saba, 1 Arab killed in [Ramat Gan].
- August 15 - Orange Grove attack by Haganah: 11 Arabs, including 4 children (3 girls and a 3-year-old boy), their parents and adult sibling were killed in an orange grove outside Tel Aviv. The Haganah claimed responsibility, four workers were killed by machine gun fire and the family of seven when the house they were sleeping in was dynamited.
- August 18 – A British police cadet was killed on Mount Zion.
- August 22 – Two British soldiers were injured when the military truck they were travelling in was hit by a mine.
- September 3 – A postal bomb sent by either Irgun or Lehi exploded in the post office sorting room of the British War Office in London, injuring two.
- September 21 – A British messenger was killed.
- September 26 – Irgun fighters robbed a bank, killing four British policemen.
- September 27 – A Jewish illegal immigrant was killed by the British.
- September 29 – 10 killed (4 British policemen, 4 Arab policemen and an Arab couple) and 53 injured in Haifa police headquarters bombing by Irgun. One ton of explosives in a barrel was used for the bombing and Irgun said it was done on the first day of Sukkot to avoid Jewish casualties.
- September 29 - Irgun bombed the Cairo–Haifa train, twenty miles south of Haifa partially derailing it. One person was hospitalised.
- October 13 – Two British soldiers were killed in Jerusalem.
- November 11 – British security forces raided a building in Ra'anana in which Lehi was holding a firearm course for a group of young recruits. The British opened fire, killing four teenagers aged 15–18 and their 19-year old instructor. Three teenagers aged 16–17 years were left severely wounded. Police and other testimony disagreed on whether the recruits posed a threat to the soldiers. The weapons inside the building were confiscated.
- November 14 – Four Britons were killed in Tel Aviv and Jerusalem.
- November 17 – 2 Britons (a soldier and a constable) killed and 28 others wounded in bombing/shooting at Jerusalem cafe.
- November 29 – UN Partition Plan is passed.
- December 8 – 4 Arabs and 4 Jews (including a woman and a 3-year-old) were killed during an Arab attack on Beit Yaakov outside Tel Aviv (this was the first mass Arab attack on a Jewish village).
- December 9 – 7 Jews and 1 Arab died in clashes in Haifa. A British soldier was also killed in Haifa and another seriously wounded by molotov cocktails thrown at their cars by Jewish insurgents.
- December 10 – A British soldier was killed and another wounded in Haifa. Two Arabs wounded in an Irgun bombing in Haifa later died.
- December 11 – 11 Jews and 9 Arabs were killed and 46 Arabs and 14 Jews injured, one British soldier was wounded and died later.(AP reported 41 total deaths, other sources reported 35). Nine of the Jewish deaths along with four injuries occurred during an attack on a bus convoy near Hebron. Four of the Arab deaths and 30 of the wounded were from bombing of a Lebanese-Arab bus in Haifa.
- December 12 – Jewish underground bombing attacks on buses in Haifa and Ramla killed 2 British soldiers, 20 Arabs and 5 Jews. Thirteen of the Arab deaths occurred during a Jewish attack on the village of Tira near Haifa. One Arab was wounded in another Jewish attack on the village of Shefat. A British Airways bus was attacked and burned near Lydda by Arabs, four people (including one Czech official) were killed.
- December 13 - Irgun bombings: 3 Arabs killed and 22 wounded (3 critically) by bombs thrown from taxi at Jerusalem's Damascus Gate, the casualties included children. A bomb thrown from a car into a Jaffa cafe killed 6 Arab adults (including an 11-year old) and injured 40 others (three were under 12). 24 armed Jewish men dressed as soldiers attacked the village of Yehudiya near Petah Tikva shooting guns and blowing up houses, 7 Arabs were killed (two women and two children, 3 and 4 years old among them) and 7 others seriously wounded (two women and girl of 4 among them).
- December 14 - 14 Jews were killed and 9 injured along with 2 British soldiers when troops from the Trans-Jordan Army fired on a bus convoy near Beth Nabala. The Jordanian troops were said to be responding to a grenade attack from the convoy. An 18-month-old Arab toddler was killed and a man wounded by a grenade thrown at an Arab bus in Jerusalem. A Jewish policeman was killed near Beersheba
- December 16 - 2 Jews and one Arab killed near Beersheba. Three Arabs killed near Gaza (reportedly by Arab assailants).
- December 18 - Haganah attack on [Al-Khisas]: 10 Arabs including five young children were killed when two cars of gunmen drove through the village firing guns and blew up two houses. The raid was ordered by Haganah as a reprisal attack for the killing of two Jewish settlement policemen.
- December 24 - 4 Arabs and 2 Jews killed, 26 wounded in shootings on streets and buses in Haifa.
- December 25 – Lehi members machine-gunned two British soldiers in a Tel Aviv cafe.
- December 29 – Two British constables and 11 Arabs were killed and 32 Arabs wounded when Irgun members threw a bomb from a taxi at Jerusalem's Damascus Gate.

=== 1948 ===
- February 12 – A British soldier was killed by a sniper in Haifa.
- February 19 – Two British soldiers were killed.
- February 23 – Two British policemen were killed.
- February 29 – As part of the Cairo–Haifa train bombings, Lehi fighters mined a train that included coaches used by British troops north of Rehovot, killing 28 British soldiers and wounding 35.
- March 3 – A British soldier was killed by a Jewish sniper.
- March 29 – A British soldier was killed by a vehicle mine in Jerusalem.
- April 6 – Irgun fighters led by Ya'akov Meridor raided the British Army camp at Pardes Hanna, killing seven British soldiers.
- April 20 – Jewish snipers attacked British soldiers and policemen throughout Haifa, wounding two policemen and a soldier. British forces returned fire and killed five snipers.
- April 28 - British troops intervened to stop Operation Hametz, leading to a small battle with the Irgun. The intervention succeeded in preventing a Jewish takeover of Jaffa, albeit it failed to expel the Irgun from Menashiya due to stiff resistance. To put pressure on Ben-Gurion to rein in the Irgun, British planes flew over Tel Aviv and also bombed Haganah positions in Bat Yam. Eventually the British issued an ultimatum to Ben-Gurion, threatening to bomb Tel Aviv if he didn't stop the Irgun offensive. The next day, an agreement was reached in which Haganah fighters would replace the Irgun in Menashiya, and the Haganah pledged not to attack Jaffa until the end of the Mandate. British troops were allowed to reoccupy the police fort in Menashiya, but the town remained in Jewish hands.
- May 3 – A Lehi book bomb posted to the parental home of British Major Roy Farran was opened by his brother Rex, killing him.
- May 14 – Israeli declaration of independence.

== Effects ==
=== Effect upon mutual British–Arab interests ===
Anglo-Arab relations were of vital importance to British strategic concerns both during the war and after, notably for their access to oil and to India via the Suez Canal. Britain governed or protected Oman, Sudan, Kuwait, the Arab Emirates, Bahrain and Yemen, had treaties of alliance with Iraq (the Anglo-Iraqi Treaty (1930) and the Anglo-Iraqi Treaty (1948)) and Egypt (Anglo-Egyptian Treaty of 1936). Transjordan was granted independence in 1946 and the Anglo-Jordanian Treaty of 1948 allowed Britain to station troops in Jordan and promised mutual assistance in the event of war.

=== Effects upon independence movements worldwide ===
According to the BBC documentary The Age of Terror: In the Name of Liberation, the successful Jewish struggle for independence in Palestine helped inspire numerous violent campaigns for independence in other countries of the world at the time, such as by the Malayan Communist Party in the Malayan Emergency and the FLN in the Algeria War. EOKA also used Irgun tactics in the Cyprus Emergency. Political scientist John Bowyer Bell, who studied both the Irgun and the Irish Republican Army, noted that many IRA men whom he interviewed in the 1960s had studied Menachem Begin's memoir The Revolt, and used it as a manual for guerrilla warfare. Nelson Mandela studied the book and used it as a guide in planning the ANC's guerrilla campaign against the apartheid government of South Africa. The Palestine Liberation Organization also drew inspiration from the Irgun's success. In 2001, invading US forces in Afghanistan found a copy of The Revolt and other books on the Jewish insurgency in the library of an Al-Qaeda training camp.

== See also ==
- 6th Airborne Division in Palestine
- Israel–United Kingdom relations
- List of modern conflicts in the Middle East
- Suez Crisis
- Violent conflicts in the British Mandate of Palestine
