= Jewish Resistance Movement =

Alliance of armed groups (1945–1946)

תנועת המרי העברי Jewish Resistance Movement
- Active: 1945–1946
- Disbanded: August 1946
- Country: Mandatory Palestine
- Allegiance: Yishuv
- Role: Defense of Yishuv

Commanders
- Notable commanders: Moshe Sneh; Yisrael Galili; Nathan Yellin-Mor; Menachem Begin

The Jewish Resistance Movement (Hebrew: תנועת המרי העברי, Tnu'at HaMeri Ha'Ivri, literally Hebrew Rebellion Movement), also called the United Resistance Movement (URM), was an alliance of the Zionist paramilitary organizations Haganah, Irgun and Lehi in the British Mandate of Palestine. It was established in October 1945 by the Jewish Agency and operated for some ten months, until August 1946. The alliance coordinated acts of sabotage to undermine the British authority in Mandatory Palestine.

The Zionist Movement had high hopes for the Labour administration elected in Britain after the Second World War. The latter, however, continued to apply the policies laid down in the White Paper of 1939 which included restrictions on Jewish immigration to Palestine.

Negotiations began for the formation of the movement in August 1945 at the behest of Haganah leaders Moshe Sneh and Israel Galili. At the end of October of the same year, an agreement was signed forming the "Jewish Resistance Movement". The leadership of the new movement included four representatives: Two from the Haganah (Sneh and Galili), a representative of the Irgun (Menachem Begin) and a representative of Lehi (Nathan Yellin Mor).

In order to coordinate the activities of the groups, a civilian committee known as "Committee X" was made up of six members, representatives of the various political stream, (including Levi Eshkol). The operations board, who approved operations plans, was made up of Yitzhak Sadeh (of the Palmach), Eitan Livni (of the Irgun) and Yaakov Eliav (1917–1985) (of the Lehi).

During the movement's existence, eleven major operations were carried out, eight of them by the Palmach and Haganah, and three by the Irgun and Lehi, as well as many smaller operations. Notable among these were:

- The release of 200 members of Aliyah Bet from the detention camp in Atlit
- The bombing of railroads and train stations on the Night of the Trains (Nov. 1945)
- The bombing of dozens of bridges around the country in the Night of the Bridges (June 1946)
- Attacks on British police stations
- Bombing of the King David Hotel in Jerusalem, where 91 people were killed, including 28 British citizens, 41 Palestinian Arabs, 17 Palestinian Jews, two Armenians, a Russian, an Egyptian, and a Greek.

In August 1946, in the wake of the King David Hotel bombing, Chaim Weizmann, president of the World Zionist Organization appealed to the movement to cease all further military activity until a decision on the issue had been reached by the Jewish Agency. The Jewish Agency backed Weizmann's recommendation to cease activities, a decision reluctantly accepted by the Haganah, but not by the Irgun and the Lehi. The JRM was dismantled and each of the founding groups continued operating according to their own policy.

== See also ==
- International Federation of Resistance Fighters – Association of Anti-Fascists
- Islamic Resistance Movement (Hamas)
- The Revolt – a book by the leader of the Irgun
- Right to resist – human right
