= List of Irgun members =

This is a list of notable members of the Irgun, either having been listed by the Irgun's website or by reputable independent sources.

Former Irgun members have held positions of highest influence in the Israeli political and security establishments since independence, and the lasting effect of the ideology espoused by groups such as the Irgun and the Lehi continues to be a source of active research and debate among responsible historians and political observers to this day.

== Irgun chief commanders ==
- Jabotinsky, Zeev (1880–1940) – leader of the Irgun
- Tehomi, Avraham (1903–1990) – first commander in chief (1931–37)
- Bitker, Robert (1907–1977) – second commander in chief (1937–38)
- Moshe Rosenberg (1890–1989) – third commander in chief (1937–38)
- Raziel, David (1910–1941) – fourth commander in chief (1938–39; 1939–41) and aluf (high commander) of the Irgun
- Kalai, Hanoch (1910–1979) – fifth commander in chief (1939)
- Meridor, Yaakov (1913–1995) – sixth commander in chief (1941–43) and seren (military leader) of the Irgun; Likud member of the 10th Knesset.
- Begin, Menachem (1913–1992) – the last commander in chief (1943–48); first Likud Prime Minister of Israel.

== The Gallows ==
The Irgun's Olei Hagardom (Jews who were hanged or committed suicide while awaiting execution during the British occupation) are as follows.

- Alkahi, Mordechai (1925–1947)
- Ben-Yosef, Shlomo (1913–1938)
- Dresner, Yehiel (1922–1947)
- Feinstein, Meir (1927–1947)
- Gruner, Dov (1912–1947)
- Haviv, Avshalom (1926–1947)
- Kashani, Eliezer (1923–1947)
- Nakar, Meir (1926–1947)
- Weiss, Yaakov (1924–1947)

== Senior commanders ==
- Aharoni, Yaakov-Sika; took part in operations against Arab rioters in the 1930s, and during World War II, accompanied David Raziel on an Irgun reconnaissance mission in Iraq on behalf of the British, in which Raziel was killed. Took part in the first attack on British intelligence offices in Jerusalem, and in raids on police stations. He was arrested several times and finally exiled to Africa, returning in 1948.
- Amitai, Shmuel (1920–1998), joined the Irgun after illegally immigrating to Palestine and joining the Betar company at Be'er Yaakov. Transferred to Jerusalem in 1944 and served as an assistant to the Irgun district commander, before being transferred to the coastal plain and served as district commander in Netanya and in the Southern District.
- Amitzur, Bezalel (1916–2011) – held various senior command positions in the Irgun, and became a member of the High Command in 1945. Was district commander of the Dan-Sharon area and briefly served as district commander of Jerusalem in 1947. He was involved in the organization of numerous Irgun operations, and personally participated in one of them, the attack on Lydda airfield. He was later chairman of the board of directors of Maman Aerospace, and founded the Irgun Museum at Jabotinsky House.
- Amrami, Yaakov (1916–1996) – joined the Irgun in 1937 while working as a policeman, and acted as an informant for the Irgun within the police. Became commander of the Irgun's intelligence service in 1945, and in 1947, was sent to Europe to buy weapons and dispatch them to Palestine. Later, he set up the Hadar publishing house, which mainly published books connected with the anti-British underground. Wrote a book entitled Hadvarim Gdolim Hem Me-itanu (Hadar, 1994).
- Ashbel, Michael (1922–1947) known as Mike. Took part in the bombing of British intelligence offices in Jaffa and a raid on the Lydda military airfield. Captured in an arms raid in Sarafand military camp and sentenced to death together with Irgun member Yosef Simchon. After the Irgun captured two British officers, their sentence was commuted to life in prison. Michael was shot and severely wounded during the Acre Prison break, and died from his injuries after several hours. He wrote several songs which became well known throughout Israel ('Little Sarah – Upon Barricades' etc.)
- Assaf, Avraham (1914–1980), joined the Irgun in 1936 one year after illegally immigrating from Hungary, and took part disembarking illegal immigrants on the Sharon coast. Was the Irgun's district commander in Netanya from 1946 to July 1947. During his tenure, arms raids against British facilities were carried out, and he also played a role in the Sergeants affair. Following the establishment of Israel, he became director of a construction company.
- Avinoam, Yitzhak (1921–2015) – Head of Irgun intelligence branch, and Irgun district commander in Jerusalem from 1945 to 1947. Irgun operations carried out in the Jerusalem area during his time as district commander include a bombing of the local British intelligence offices, the King David Hotel bombing, the bombing of the Goldschmidt Officer's Club, and the attack on the Schneller Camp. Arrested in March 1947, exiled to Eritrea, and returned to Israel in July 1948.
- Avni, Yosef – took part in a bombing of the British intelligence offices in Jerusalem, the King David Hotel bombing (where he commanded the first group ("the porters") that arrived at the King David Hotel prior to Yisrael Levi's "strike force"), and the attack on the Schneller Camp. Arrested in 1947 and detained in Latrun, he was released in March 1948 and took part in the attack on Deir Yassin (where he was wounded during an attack on the Mukhtar's house).
- Ben-Eliezer, Aryeh (1913–1970) – co-founder, Committee for the Rescue of European Jewry and later on the Committee for National Liberation. Elected to the Knesset as a Herut member and served as Deputy Speaker.
- Cohen, Dov ("Shimshon") (1915–1947) Served in the British army until 1945. Joined the Irgun and took part in a large number of actions, including an attack on the Lydda military airfield and a major railway sabotage operation. Commanded the Acre Prison break while dressed as a Royal Engineers captain, in which he was killed while trying to save his men.
- Cohen, Ben-Zion ("Giora") – Served in the British Army and joined the Irgun after demobilization in 1946. Participated in actions against the British and battles against the Arabs. He served as a senior commander in the capture of Deir Yassin and was deputy commander in the capture of Malha. Later joined the IDF and attained the rank of Major, and "participated in various security projects within the framework of Raphael (The Authority for Development of Weapons)."
- Cohen, Rahamim ("Gad"); commanded the Fighting Force in Jerusalem in early 1944, and led the first attack on the British intelligence offices in Jerusalem's Russian Compound. While leading a September 1944 attack against a police station in Haifa, his hand was shattered while holding a live grenade. He continued to lead the operation, and following its completion, was taken to hospital, where he was arrested and exiled to Africa, returning in 1948.
- Corfu, Haim (1921–2015) – joined the Irgun in 1937 and built explosives and mines for Irgun use. He took part in the assassination of CID officers Ralph Cairns and Ronald Barker, personally detonating the remotely-controlled mine that killed them. In 1944, he was responsible for the bombing of the Income Tax Offices, and was subsequently arrested and interned in Africa, returning to Israel in 1948. Later became an Israeli politician.
- Efrat, Dov; became deputy district commander of Jerusalem in 1944, and then district commander. In August 1945, he was arrested and found to be carrying a parcel containing detonators. He was sentenced to seven years in prison, but was freed in the Acre Prison break.
- Eliav, Yaakov ("Yashka") (1917–1985) – was in charge of the Irgun's Jerusalem operations in 1938. During the split within the Irgun, sided with Avraham Stern and became one of the founders of the Lehi, and later, its Chief Operating Officer for several years.
- Elis, Shraga (1921–2014) – commanded the Irgun's Fighting Force in Jerusalem from 1944–45 and took part in numerous operations, among them an attack on British intelligence offices which he commanded. In June 1945, he was transferred to the Planning Division in Tel Aviv. He took part in planning the King David Hotel bombing and performed a reconnaissance mission inside the hotel as part of the preparations. He also had a part in the attack on the British officers club at Goldschmidt House, the Acre Prison break, and the Battle of Jaffa.
- Franckel, Isidore – Irgun French National Commander; founding leader of the Revisionist Movement Herut of France; President of the Zionist Federation of France and one of the founders of Hatzohar – Union of Zionists-Revisionists.
- Goldshmid, Yehoshua ("Gal") (1925–1948) – took part in King David Hotel bombing, commanded the attack on Camp Schneller, planned the attack on Deir Yassin, and led the capture of the police academy at Sheikh Jarrah in Jerusalem on May 14, 1948. Killed in action on May 19, 1948, during an Arab Legion counterattack on the police academy. The youngest Irgun member to be commander of Jerusalem.
- Grosbard, David (1915–1990) – was a member of the Irgun High Command and the Planning Division. He set up the Irgun's clandestine radio service, medical service, and workshops for the production of mortars, Sten guns, and explosives. Took part in a 1947 arms raid against an RAF base. He later served as a member of the central institutions of the Herut movement and manager of the Herut newspaper.
- Heichman, Aharon – listed by other sources as a High Commander; later a manager of ZOA House in Tel Aviv.
- Hillel, Yaakov ("Asher") – according to the Irgun website, "took part in reprisals against Arabs rioters", in the blowing up of income tax offices in Haifa and in the embarkation of the Altalena from France.
- Kaplan, Benjamin (1927–1948) – participated in telephone and railway sabotage, an attack on an RAF airfield, arms raids against British installations, sabotage against the telephone network, and a mortar attack on a British Army. Arrested in April 1946 following a massive railway sabotage operation during which he wounded a British sergeant, he was sentenced to life in prison, but freed in the Acre Prison break after 13 months of imprisonment. After his escape, he was appointed commander of the Fighting Force in Netanya. He had a leading role in the Sergeants affair, personally leading the Irgun squad that abducted two British sergeants and later attending the hangings. He subsequently partook in operations against the Arabs, including the Battle of Jaffa in April 1948. In May 1948, shortly after Israeli independence, he was killed in action during the War of Independence.
- Katz, Shmuel (1914–2008) – was a member of the Irgun High Command, and focused on propaganda and overseas contacts, including with Irgun members abroad. He was one of the founders of the Herut movement and a member of the First Knesset; was later invited by Menachem Begin to be his propaganda adviser.
- Koenig, Zvi ("Yishai") (1924–1948), took part in the attack on Lydda military airfield, an arms raid at the Sarafand military camp, and the raid on the Ramat Gan police station, during which he was wounded in the arm and leg. He was arrested and detained in the Latrun camp, but was released and resumed his Irgun activities before the British left. Fought in the War of Independence. After settling in Ramat Raziel and being appointed regional commander of the Judean Hills area, he was killed in a road accident.
- Kook, Hillel – together with other Irgun members, was active in the United States from 1940 to 1948 under the name "Peter Bergson". He was active in disseminating propaganda and raising funds for the Irgun. Took part in the establishment of the Committee for the Rescue of European Jewry, and the Hebrew Committee for National Liberation. Elected to the First Knesset as a Herut member.
- Landau, Haim ("Avraham") (1916–1981) – was a senior commander in the Irgun, as well as a Herut founder and Knesset member. He held positions in the Begin government.
- Lapidot, Yehuda ("Nimrod") – took part in railway sabotage and had commanding roles in the assault on Ramat Rachel and Deir Yassin, as well as in Operation Kedem; later a professor of biochemistry, adviser to Begin, and noted author.
- Lankin, Eliyahu ("Benyamin") (1914–1994) – commanded the Altalena; later a battalion commander in the IDF, and a member of the first Knesset.
- Lev-Ami, Shlomo (1919–2011), member of the high command.
- Levi, Yisrael ("Gideon") (1926–1990) – commanded the Irgun squad that carried out the King David Hotel bombing, and personally set the fuses. Took part in many other Irgun operations, among them a bombing of British intelligence offices in Jerusalem.
- Levi, Yosef ("Uzi") (1916–1948)
- Livni, Eitan (1919–1992) – took part in the Night of the Trains attack, a joint Irgun-Lehi-Haganah bombing of the country's railroad network on October 31-November 1, 1945, during which he commanded an Irgun raid on a railway station. Became Chief Operations Officer of the Irgun, and in this capacity, supervised the planning and execution of operations. He was arrested in April 1946 following a major railway sabotage operation, but freed in the Acre Prison break. He was then sent to Europe to organize clandestine actions against British targets before returning to Israel to take part in the War of Independence. Later active in the Herut movement and served as member of the Eighth, Ninth and Tenth Knessets; father of Foreign Affairs Minister Tzipi Livni. Eitan's gravestone bears a map of Greater Israel with borders extending out to the Jordan River.
- Malatzky, Menachem; Held senior positions in the Irgun's intelligence service, and was appointed district commander of Haifa and the Northern District. He was arrested in a major railway sabotage operation in April 1946. He managed to briefly escape during the Acre Prison break, but was wounded and swiftly recaptured. He was transferred to Jerusalem Central Prison, and managed to escape in February 1948. Later co-founded the Shelah publishing house.
- Mazali (Pshadetzky) Aryeh (1917–1983), took part in an attack against the British police station in Gedera in 1944, and later appointed commander of Haifa and the North District. He was arrested by the British and detained in Africa until 1948.
- Meiten, Shmuel
- Meridor (Vizhvolovsky) Eliyahu ("Dan") (1914–1966) – active in the Herut movement and member of the Fourth, Fifth and Sixth Knesset; father of Finance Minister Dan Meridor.
- Nathanson, Isser (1916–1977) – later joined the Department of Physics at Hebrew University of Jerusalem.
- Paglin, Amichai ("Gidi") (1922–1978) – became the Irgun Chief of Operations from 1946 when Eitan Livni was caught. Paglin had a role in planning and organizing over 200 Irgun operations against both the British and Arabs, some of which he participated in personally. Some the actions he had a leading role in were the King David Hotel bombing, the attack on the British officer's club at Goldschmidt House, attacks on British military airfields, the Acre Prison break, the abduction and hanging of two British sergeants, numerous arms raids, and the conquest of Jaffa. He also oversaw the manufacturing of weapons such as mortars, mines, and improvised flamethrowers in the Irgun's underground weapons factories. The IDF refused to enlist him in 1948, and he returned to his family's industrial oven business. He built the oven in which Adolf Eichmann's body was burnt. Following Menachem Begin's election, he was appointed counter-terrorism adviser to the Prime Minister, but died in a traffic accident in 1978.
- Raanan, Mordechai (1922–2003) – joined the Irgun in 1938, and was appointed Jerusalem district commander in 1947. Had a key role in planning the Deir Yassin assault. Later established the Israel Printing Press and Nativ Publishing House.
- Raz, Yaakov (1919–1938) Among the first Irgun members to fall. He took part in attacks against Arabs in reprisals for attacks against Jews, and was severely wounded after being caught trying to plant a bomb in an Arab market. After being arrested and interrogated by the British police while in hospital, Raz, apparently fearing he would divulge secret information while delirious, committed suicide by tearing off his bandages and allowing himself to bleed to death. Israeli national poet Uri Zvi Greenberg wrote a song in his honor.
- Russo, Nissim Ben-Yaakov (1933–2006) – "Participated in the blowing up of the King David Hotel, the attack on the British officers club and many other operations. Was seriously wounded in ambush by British military while attempting to carry out another operation."
- Salomon, Dov ("Yishai"; b. 1925), took part in the attack on Qastina airfield and a sabotage operation against the railway bridges near Rehovot. Commanded the attack on the British officer's club at Goldschmidt House, and was deputy commander of the Acre Prison break.
- Shamir, Petachia – Held various positions in the Irgun, and rose to become deputy district commander of Tel Aviv. Following the death of Yosef Levy during the Battle of Jaffa, he became district commander. Was later Herut founder, serving as head of its Organizational Division; also served as Betar commissioner
- Simchon, Yosef (1926–1955), participated in the bombing of British intelligence offices in Jaffa and the attack on Qastina airfield. In March 1946, he participated in an Irgun arms raid against the Sarafand military base, during which he and Michael Ashbel were captured and given death sentences, after the Irgun seized British hostages. Was freed in the Acre Prison break and returned to Irgun activity.
- Stern, Avraham ("Yair") (1907–1942) Split with the IZL in 1940 following the IZL decision for a unilateral cease-fire during the war. Founded the Lehi and gave it its anthem and ideology.
- Sudit-Sharon, Eliezer ("Kabtzan") (1925–2011)
- Tahori, David ("Yitzhak") – took part in the September 29, 1947 Haifa police station bombing, in which 4 British policement, 4 Arab policemen and 2 Arab civilians were killed, and 46 persons injured.
- Tamler, Eliyahu ("Yehoshua"; 1919–1948). Born Eduard (Edi) Samuel Tamler in Zastavna, Romania (Bucovina). Participated in the 1948 Jerusalem prison break, became the Irgun commander for the Tel-Aviv & Jaffa district, and was killed by a British shell on April 29, 1948.
- Tamir, Shmuel (1923–1987) – commanded the 1944 bombing of the Income Tax Offices in Jerusalem, and in 1946 was appointed deputy district commander and head of intelligence in Jerusalem. Was arrested by the British in March 1947 and exiled to Kenya until 1948. Later became a lawyer and had a part in the Rudolf Kastner case. He was also a Knesset member (1965–80), and Minister of Justice in the Begin government (1977–80)
- Tavin, Eliezer-Yaakov (1919–1994), senior intelligence officer in the Irgun, abducted by the Haganah during the Hunting Season and later released. He was sent to Europe to create Irgun cells in Europe, and was in charge of the Irgun's 1946 bombing of the British Embassy in Rome.
- Zeroni, Benyamin (1914–2008)

== Other members ==
The Irgun's exact membership roster is not known, and like many paramilitary and clandestine organizations, was somewhat nebulous; and in any case certain highly notable early Irgun members (such as Yitzhak Shamir) simply are not listed on the Irgun website. The following persons have been attributed by reputable sources as having significant roles, either as bona fide IZL members, assets or close affiliates.

- Yitzhak Shamir, joined the Irgun in 1937; joined the Stern faction in 1940; was a senior commander in Lehi after Stern's assassination.
- Uri Avnery, joined as a teenager (1938–1942); later became a radical socialist activist. In 1945 he would publish a pamphlet, "Terrorism: the infantile disease of the Hebrew revolution".
- Yosef Meller (1927–2010), participated in the Sergeants affair. Drove the vehicle during the abduction, attended the hangings, and the re-hangings of the bodies in the orange grove. Later owned a popular gift shop in Netanya. At the time of his death, he was the last surviving participant in the Sergeants affair.
- Benjamin M. Emanuel, passed "secret codes" to Menachem Begin. A Chicago pediatrician, he is father to Rahm Emanuel, Ari Emanuel and Ezekiel J. Emanuel.
- Natan Yellin-Mor (1913–1980), co-editor of the Irgun's newspaper in Poland from 1938–39. Illegally immigrated to Palestine and joined Lehi, where he became a member of its high command. Was one of the planners of Lord Moyne's assassination. Later became an Israeli politician and pacifist.
- Sanford H. Margalith (1926–2018) Recognized by Ripley's Believe it or Not for joining United States Marines at age 13, then going on to join the Army at 15 and Navy at 16. He was decorated in the US with numerous medals for bravery, and also was awarded a Purple Heart. In 1947–48 he was part of a team that collected, assembled and shipped weapons from US to Israel. Per the Daily News in New York in April 1948 the FBI and cops discovered a cache of rifles, pistols, hand grenades and other arms destined for Palestine. His colleagues were arrested. He moved to Israel where he worked for the Irgun in Intelligence as well as participated in armed combat.
- Kalman Magen (1929–1974), Israeli general.
- Maks Birnbach (1920–2007), participated in raising funds and support in America.
- Abraham Stavsky, who procured the Altalena for the Irgun (though not a member); also said to be active in the so-called Bergson Group (the Irgun delegation to the U.S.)
- Mordechai Olmert (1908–1998), among the founders of the Irgun, later an Israeli politician and father of Prime Minister Ehud Olmert
- Uzzi Ornan, bomb-maker, detained by the British in 1944 and exiled in Africa. Later became a linguist and a political activist
- Elie Wiesel. As a student in Sorbonne, Wiesel translated from Hebrew to Yiddish for the Irgun newspaper Zion in Kamf (November 1947 – January 1949). He later was awarded the Nobel Peace Prize in appreciation for his lifelong activities on behalf of persecuted peoples of the world as well as for his educational activities regarding the Holocaust, of which he himself was a survivor.
- Shmuel Krauskopf (1917–2006), covert operations (Political Assassinations by Jews: A Rhetorical Device for Justice, By Nachman Ben-Yehuda). Shmuel was also a member of the Jewish Brigade.

== Contract affiliates ==
Persons of notable affiliation to the Irgun, but who were probably not members in any formal sense.

- Lt. Monroe Fein, the U.S. naval officer who captained the Altalena.

== ZZW / IZL issues ==
The whole issue of the Żydowski Związek Wojskowy (known in Hebrew as Irgun Zvai Leumi and in English as the National Military Organization), the Revisionist Zionist resistance organization in Warsaw under the time of the German occupation, is rather complicated due to the ZZW's being largely ignored by the "mainstream" Irgun in Israel, while all the same there are ZZW members such as Dawid Wdowinski who pointedly describe theirs as a bonafide IZL faction.
