= Amichai Paglin =

Head of the Israeli paramilitary group Irgun

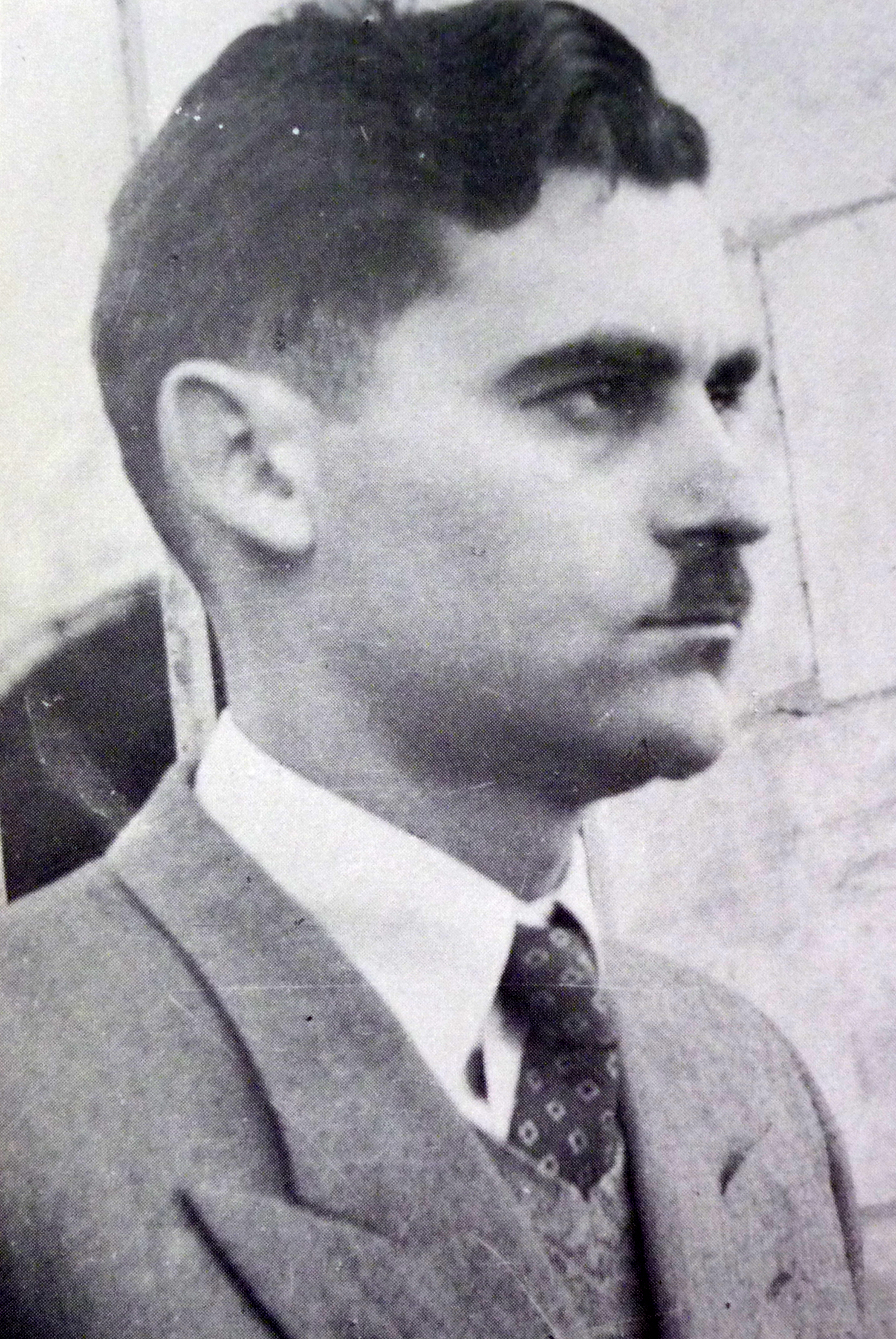
- Native name: עמיחי פאגלין
- Born: December 1, 1922 Tel Aviv, Mandatory Palestine
- Died: February 25, 1978 (aged 56) Tel Aviv, Israel
- Allegiance: Haganah; Irgun

Amichai Paglin, codename "Gidi" (Hebrew: עמיחי פאגלין; December 1, 1922 – February 25, 1978) was an Israeli businessman who served as Chief Operations Officer of the Irgun during the Mandate era. He planned and personally led numerous attacks against the British during the Jewish insurgency in Palestine, including the notorious King David Hotel bombing, commanded the battle to conquer Jaffa in the 1947–48 Civil War in Mandatory Palestine, and participated in the 1948 Arab–Israeli War. Following independence, he ran an industrial oven factory together with his father, and was later appointed Prime Minister Menachem Begin's counter-terrorism adviser. Only a few months after his appointment, however, Paglin died in a car crash.

== Biography ==
Amichai Paglin was born in Tel Aviv, the son of Gershon and Sima Paglin. His family had immigrated from Lithuania in 1920. Paglin attended Tel Nordau elementary school and Balfour high school. He was in the same class as Lehi fighter Eliyahu Bet-Zuri and future IDF Chief of Staff Tzvi Tzur.

At a young age he joined the Haganah, and was appointed the signaller of Efraim Dekel, the commander of Shai (the Haganah intelligence unit). He participated in a squad commander course, and expected to participate in significant operations against the British. However, to his disappointment, he was commanded to scrape posters off walls and to do other simple activities.

== Activity in the Irgun ==
Paglin's family was associated with the Labor Movement. His older brother, Neriel, was a member of the Palyam, the naval commando unit of the Haganah's strike force, the Palmach, and was an assistant to Haganah commander Yisrael Galili. Neriel was one of the 23 Palyam soldiers who died on the ship Ari HaYam when it sank off of Vichy-controlled Lebanon in May 1941, during Operation Boatswain, a mission for the Allies. This frustrated Amichai greatly, who felt that his brother had given his life for the British, and yet the British did not open Palestine to Jewish immigration. This encouraged him to join the more anti-British Irgun.

He joined the "Hayil Kravi" (Combat Corps) of the Irgun and immediately began acting as a simple soldier. He participated in one of their first operations, the Irgun's bombing of the Immigration Department in Haifa, carried out as a protest against the British refusal to allow large numbers of Jewish refugees into Palestine. Afterwards, he participated in attacks against the Income Tax offices and the CID building in Tel Aviv.

Paglin stood out for his courage, his technical knowledge, his fertile imagination, and his daring and original plans to strike the enemy. Menachem Begin (the leader of the Irgun), would later write about him, "this amazing young man, his military ability borders, without doubt, on the genius...."

In 1946, after the arrest of Eitan Livni, the Chief Operations Officer of the Irgun, "Gidi" was appointed to the position in his place. In this position he planned over 200 attacks: both against the British, and in the 1947–1949 Palestine war, against the Arabs. In many of these attacks, he personally participated.

Paglin planned the King David Hotel bombing, the attack on the British Air Force base at Qastina, the Goldschmidt House officers club bombing, the Acre Prison break, and led the Irgun squad that hanged two British sergeants from trees near Netanya, as a response to the hanging of convicted Irgun members by the British. He also led the battle for Jaffa in the 1947–1949 Palestine war and an unsuccessful attempt to conquer Ramle.

After the Irgun merged with the Israel Defense Forces in the coastal area, he transferred to Jerusalem, where the Irgun continued as an independent entity. He participated in the joint attempt to break the siege on Jerusalem's Old City (together with the Haganah and the Lechi).

When the Irgun tried bringing the Altalena arms ship, Begin did not believe that the IDF would shoot at the Jews of the Irgun. Paglin warned him that they would likely attack, and therefore should direct the ship elsewhere. In the end, Paglin was correct, and fighting broke out. As the ship was being shelled, Paglin headed towards Ramat Gan in an attempt to capture the seat of government. However, he was detained by IDF soldiers. He eventually managed to escape, but it was too late to help the Altalena or threaten the government. In the end, the Irgun was disbanded and integrated into the IDF.

When the Irgun disbanded, there was an agreement that three commanders from the Irgun would be appointed as generals in the new army. Paglin attempted to be drafted twice, but was rejected due to "health reasons" (apparently by direct order of Prime Minister David Ben-Gurion.)

== After 1948 ==
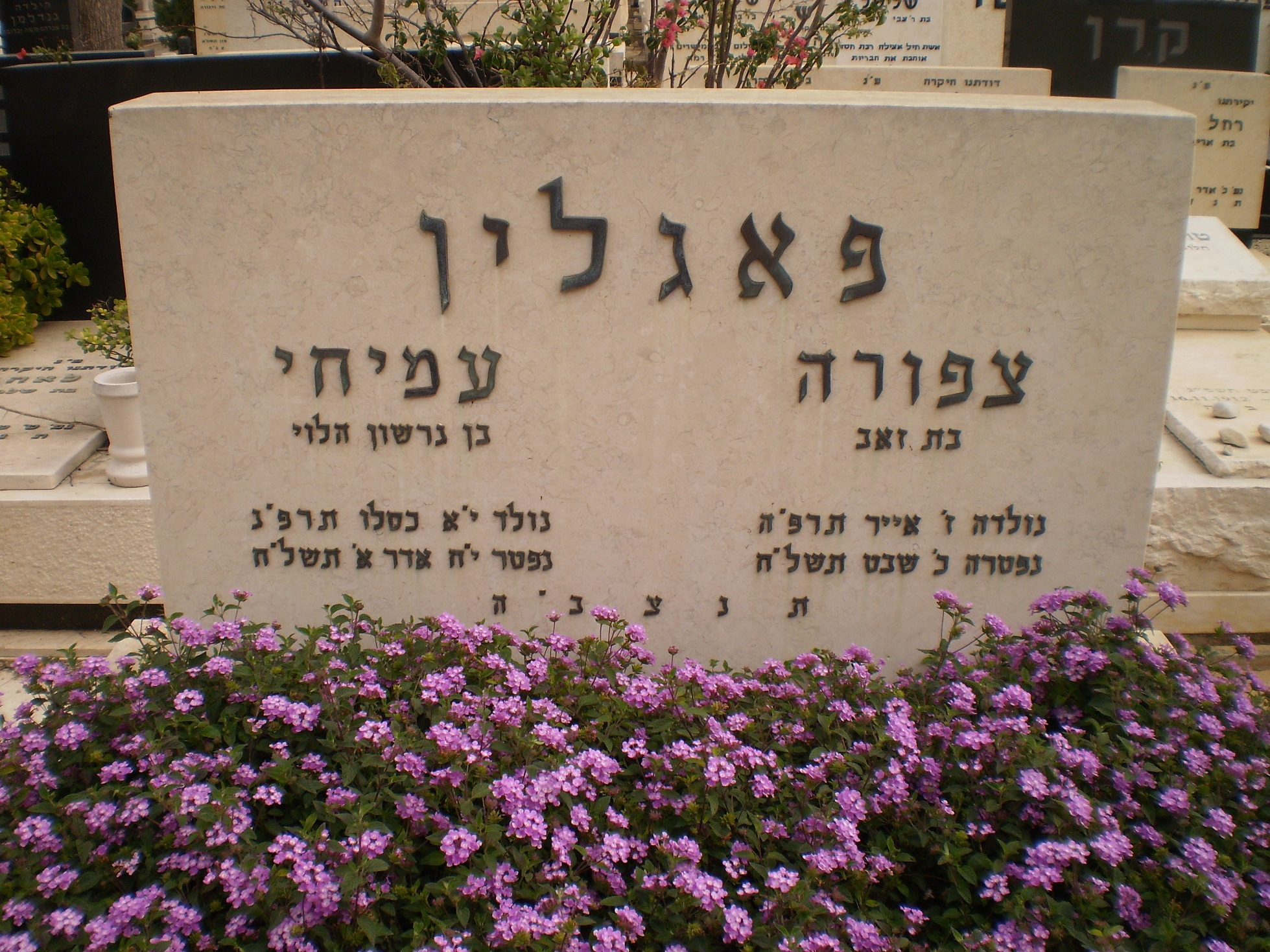
Grave of Amichai and Tzipora Paglin

He married Tzipora Perl, who served with him in the underground. They had two children, a son named Neriel and a daughter named Galia. Together with his father Gershon, he built a factory in Petah Tikva for industrial ovens, which became famous for building the oven in which the body of Nazi war criminal Adolf Eichmann was cremated after his execution in Israel.

Paglin was not active in political life, but continued to deal with military and security matters. However, in 1966, Shmuel Tamir challenged Begin for the leadership of the Herut Party. Tamir invited Paglin to speak, where he attacked the management of the party as well. But when the party recovered from its divisions, Paglin became close with Begin again.

In the period leading up to the Six-Day War in 1967, the Mossad considered a plan to sink a large boat full of mortar in the Suez Canal to prevent all passage. The difficulty was finding a way to sink the boat fast enough before the Egyptians would have a chance to move it. Due to his creativity and experience, Paglin was approached. He quickly came up with plans, but due to the sudden breakout of war, the operation never occurred.

In September 1972, Paglin conspired with Rabbi Meir Kahane, Avraham Hershkowitz, and Yosef Schneider, then members of the Jewish Defense League, to smuggle weapons to Rome and take over the Libyan embassy, kill half of those present, and then escape, as revenge for the murder of the eleven Israeli athletes in Munich. Paglin had a number of weapon stores, which he had gathered from the Sinai Campaign and the Six-Day War. He delivered to Hershkowitz two Carl Gustav submachine guns, two 9mm Beretta pistols, three hand grenades and ammunition for rifles and pistols. The crate, which arrived at the El-Al luggage department disguised as biscuit baking equipment on September 13, aroused suspicion and the contents were discovered. Hershkowitz was arrested on September 15 (and claimed that Kahane had handed them over to the authorities). Paglin was arrested on September 19 and the attorney Shmuel Tamir was hired to represent him. Paglin admitted to Tamir that he gave into temptation and fell victim to one time weakness. Through his aunt, former Knesset Member Beba Idelson, he sent a message to Prime Minister Golda Meir saying that he was willing to meet with her and explain that there was no underground movement against the State. During the trial, Tamir hinted that Rabbi Kahane (who was not arrested) had collaborated with the authorities, and questioned why Kahane's passport wasn't confiscated. During the trial, Paglin received favorable treatment, and stayed at the police station in Nes Tziona and at the Basel Hotel in Tel Aviv. At the end of the trial those involved received light sentences, and Paglin received a one-year suspended sentence. MK Benjamin Halevy, a former Supreme Court judge, summarized the affair in this way: "As a former Irgun member, with serious experience in the underground, Paglin was caught in a trap by people far less serious."

When the Likud took power in 1977, Prime Minister Begin appointed Paglin as his counter-terrorism adviser. He invested in this position his characteristic enthusiasm and diligence. However, a few months after his appointment, he was killed in a traffic accident with his wife Tziporah, when an elderly driver suffered a heart attack, lost control of the wheel, and collided into his car.

The Irgun Museum on the Jaffa coast, Beit Gidi, is named after him.
