= Ramleh War Cemetery =

Ramleh Cemetery
- Commonwealth War Graves Commission
- Used for those deceased 1917–1948
- Established: 1917
- Location: 31°55′47″N 34°53′08″E near Ramla, Israel
- Total burials: 3,300 (World War I); 1,168 (World War II); 525 (Mandatory Palestine); 892 (non-Commonwealth)
- Unknowns: 964 (World War I)
- Commemorated: 328 (inaccessible cemeteries)

Burials by nation
- Commonwealth Soldiers First World War : United Kingdom 1,705; India 479; New Zealand 87; Australia 60; South Africa 6 Canada 1 Commonwealth Soldiers Second World War: United Kingdom 1,082; India 37; South Africa 29; Australia 11; New Zealand 7 Canada 1 Other Soldiers First World War; German Empire 17; Other Soldiers Second World War; Poland 272; Italy 41; Arab World 11; Germany 10; Other 12; First World War Memorial; Egypt 269; India 72; Ottoman Empire 29; German Empire 4 Second World War Memorial other 34

Ramleh Commonwealth War Graves Commission Cemetery and Memorial to the Missing is for personnel of both World Wars and the period of Mandatory Palestine. It is located in the town of Ramla in Israel.

The cemetery grounds were assigned to the United Kingdom in perpetuity by the municipality of Ramla in recognition of the sacrifices made by the British Empire in the defence and liberation of Palestine during the war. It is the largest cemetery for Commonwealth forces in Israel.

== Location ==
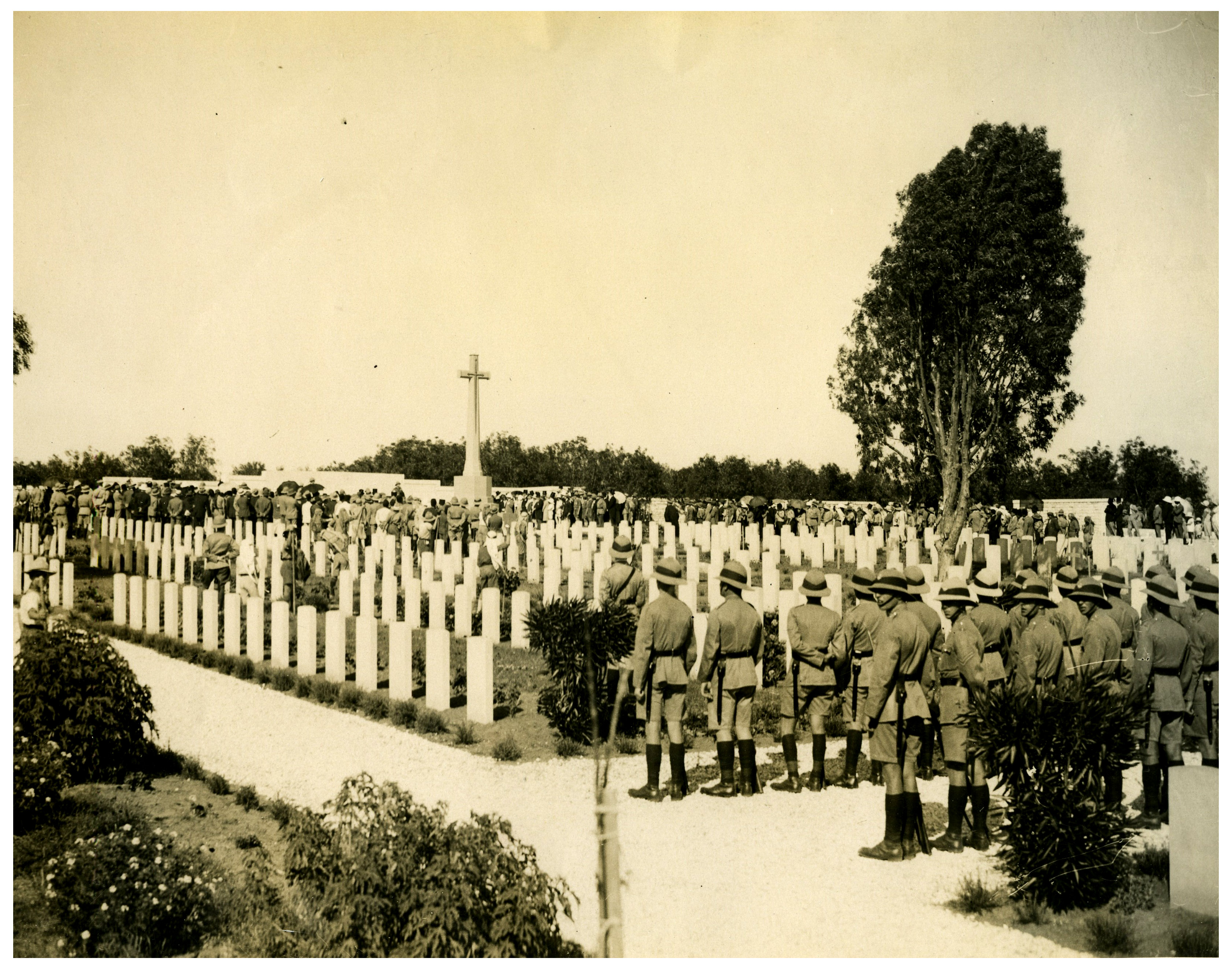
Unveiling of the cemetery on 6 May 1927

The cemetery lies on a plain looking towards the hills of Judea in the general direction of Jerusalem. The location is close to the site of the Battle of Junction Station (13 to 14 November 1917). The cemetery was in use throughout the period of Mandatory Palestine, including the World War II, up to the start of May 1948. British burials of the few troops who stayed until end of June 1948 in order to finish the evacuation are buried in Khayat Beach War Cemetery in Haifa.

== Noted burials ==
One notable grave from the World War I period is that of politician and soldier Neil Primrose. Among others buried in the cemetery are the two British sergeants, Mervyn Paice and Clifford Martin, who were hanged by the Irgun in 1947 in response to the death sentences carried out on three of their members by the British Mandate authorities.

In 2010, the grave of a British soldier named Harry Potter, killed in a pre-World War II gun battle in 1939, was listed on the Ramle's tourism website after becoming a popular tourist spot following the worldwide fame of the fictional wizard with the same name.

== See also ==
- Gaza War Cemetery
- The Sergeants affair
