= Avshalom Haviv =

Irgun underground member (1926–1947)

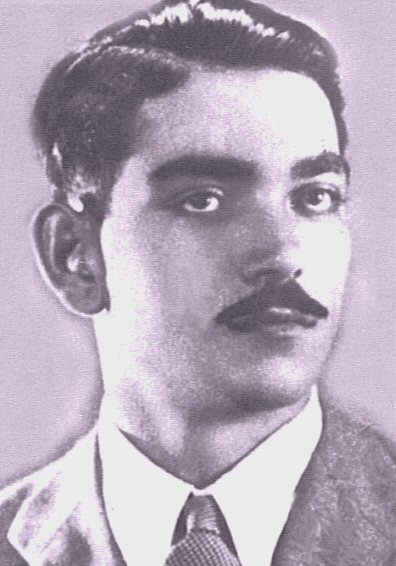
- Native name: אבשלום חביב
- Born: June 18, 1926; Haifa, Mandatory Palestine
- Died: July 29, 1947 (aged 21) Acre Prison, Acre, Mandatory Palestine
- Cause of death: Execution by hanging
- Buried: Safed Old Jewish Cemetery, Israel
- Allegiance: Irgun; Palmach
- Conflicts: Jewish insurgency in Mandatory Palestine: Acre Prison break (executed)

Avshalom Haviv (Hebrew: אבשלום חביב; June 18, 1926 – July 29, 1947) was a member of the Irgun underground organization in Mandatory Palestine, and one of the Olei Hagardom executed by the British authorities during the Jewish insurgency in Palestine. His hanging, along with that of two other Irgun members, triggered the Irgun's retaliatory hangings of two British sergeants.

== Childhood and adolescence ==
Avshalom Haviv was born on June 18, 1926 (Tammuz 6, 5686, according to the Jewish calendar), in Haifa. His father, Eliezer Haviv, was a well-known leather merchant. His mother was Rivkah Haviv. Haviv grew up and received his education in Jerusalem, residing with his family on Straus Street. In his youth, he studied at the Tachkemoni School, and as a high school student in Beit Hakerem he was drawn towards Zionist ideas. His school essays expressed opinions on the achievements of the Zionist party and the policy of the British government, which then ruled Palestine. In an essay entitled "The Aspirations of an Enslaved Youth" he included the passage:

My aspiration is: one language will take hold in the land, not German, not Yiddish will be spoken in the land of Israel, but rather the language of the Tanakh, the ancient language of Hebrew. My ambition is the aliyah of all of the nation of Israel into the land of Israel and those that will dwell here on the two sides of the Jordan river, and the land that was promised to us by the English will be only ours. In this hoped-for time there will be here a Hebrew state like all states. Amen, ken yihyeh ratson! ["Amen, may it be your will!", a phrase used in the Jewish liturgy]

== The underground ==
At age 15, Haviv joined the Irgun Zionist underground movement and received the nickname "Efraim." He was initially part of Hatam - the Irgun's propaganda unit.

On finishing high school, Haviv joined the Palmach, the elite fighting force of the Haganah as a condition for being allowed to study at university, as the Jewish Agency obliged all Jewish high school graduates to spend a year either working on a kibbutz or serving in the Palmach. He underwent military training at Ein Harod. On October 10, 1945, he participated in a Palmach raid on the Atlit detainee camp to free Holocaust survivors being held by the British authorities as illegal immigrants. The raid freed 208 inmates, among them Yaakov Weiss, who would go on to join the Irgun and eventually be hanged alongside Haviv.

About a month after his release from the Palmach, he returned to Jerusalem and began to study Hebrew literature, philosophy, and economics at the Hebrew University of Jerusalem, and at the same time returned to the Irgun. Gradually, he spent more and more time on operations with the Combat Corps of the Irgun (the HaK, hayil kravi), and as a result ended his university studies. In many operations, Haviv took on the job of machine gunner, mainly participating in attacks on the British police's Criminal Investigation Department (CID) in Jerusalem and on the government income tax offices, as well as in mining operations in the Jerusalem-Bethlehem area against British security traffic. On January 19, 1946, Haviv participated in an attack on the Central Prison in Jerusalem's Russian Compound in a failed attempt to free Jewish underground prisoners, in which two of the raiders and a British soldier and policeman were killed. On March 1, 1947, Haviv took part in an Irgun attack on a British officer's club in Goldschmidt House, which was in Jerusalem's Russian Compound. The attack took place on Shabbat, and Haviv, who was traditionally religious, left the synagogue during prayer. Haviv provided covering fire with a Bren gun for an Irgun sapper team which tossed explosive charges into the Goldschmidt House, leveling the building. During the operation, Haviv burned his hand on the gun barrel, but stayed at his post until the end of the mission.

Haviv took part in the Acre Prison break on May 4, 1947, in which Irgun fighters raided Acre Prison to free Jewish underground prisoners. Haviv was the leader of a blocking squad that laid mines to delay British pursuers, allowing the getaway trucks carrying escaped prisoners and retreating raiders to escape. Dov Salomon, a senior commander participating in the operation who was responsible for calling away the blocking squads, forgot to tell Haviv that the operation was over. As a result, his squad was left behind during the withdrawal. During the retreat from Acre Prison, other Irgun members shouted at him that the operation was over, but Haviv felt he had to wait for a formal order from Salomon before withdrawing. Thus, his team did not withdraw from their post. Haviv and four other men; Meir Nakar, Yaakov Weiss, Amnon Michaelov, and Nahman Zitterbaum, were left behind. Haviv and his men were still at their post when the British arrived. Accounts as to what happened next vary. According to some sources, they managed to hold the British at bay until their ammunition ran out, while the prosecutor allegedly stated that Haviv claimed to be a Haganah observer when he was arrested.

== Trial and verdict ==
The trial began on Wednesday, May 28, 1947, after a delay of two days due to Yaakov Weiss' illness. The judges were Colonel M.E. Fell (the President of the Court), Major D. Lee Hunter, and Captain I. Stewart. The accused sang the Zionist anthem Hatikvah to the members of the court, whereupon the judges stood up to be later rebuked by the presiding judge for shaming the court. Haviv asked to read a declaration in response to the judge's question, but was told by the President of the Court that he was there to answer questions, not to recite declarations. When Haviv insisted, two policemen were ordered to bring him forward by force. Meanwhile, the accused disrupted the trial by not answering the judge's questions, asking their friends to answer for them, or alternatively got up from their places or pretended to doze off. When witnesses were called to testify, the defendants chatted among themselves and exchanged jokes. In isolated incidents the defendants referred to the events preceding their trial. Avshalom got up and asked one of the witnesses, a British soldier who was present during his detention: "Can you explain to me precisely what you meant when you said to me 'gas chambers are a game compared to what is expected for you in Israel'?" When they weren't answering questions, the defendants continued to talk amongst themselves and to draw caricatures of members of the court.

The trial lasted 14 days and 35 witnesses were called before the time came for the defense to present its case. The defendants, who originally opposed the authority of the court to judge them, also opposed defense proceedings. Despite this each defendant prepared a long affidavit with statements opposing tyrannical British rule, which were delivered on June 10, 1947. In his affidavit, Haviv equated the Irish War of Independence and American Revolution to the Jewish underground struggle:

"... if you were wise, British tyrants, and would learn from history, the example of Ireland and America would be enough to convince you that you ought to hurry out of our country which is enveloped in the flames of holy revolt, flames which are not extinguished but only flare up the more with every drop of blood shed by you or in the fight against you."

He finished his speech with these words:

"... you, whose wasted pride removes you from your thought, what for you and for the free soul which is ready to endanger its life and even to sacrifice its life for the sake of freedom?... You are amazed: how it occurred that these Jews of whom we thought to be cowards, who were close to slaughter for generations, rose against our reign, fight against our armies and even nullify our orders, scorn death?... And certainly the matter is simpler than it seems to you. With two things the essential character of our generation was stabilized: the land of our birth and the disaster in exile. The land of our birth is what unified us and gave strength to our remnant, bravery to our hearts and hope for our future... It is what held for us the powerful tradition of the Maccabees and Bar Kochba, and on the other side a disaster without example in the exile. It is what taught us, that we stand in a system not just on our freedom, but rather the fact of our existence... It is what taught us that if we don't fight—we will be destroyed, and it is what held fear for each and every one of us. In every land people stand before you who are no longer afraid. For what shall they be afraid of? Is it death that will be feared by the members of a people from whom millions died in one horror, without reason and without end; in our remembrance of our destroyed friends—our hearts abound with joy that we were not crushed like them, because in our lot fell the holy prerogative to fight for our land, to be on the land of our birth, to write a chapter of courage and to leave a testament, not of cowardice and slaughter, but rather of strength and a battle for freedom, for the coming generations... And even this you will certainly not understand, when I, a young Hebrew man, who stands before a five-fold threat of murder, raise up my heart and my God in heaven, and give praise and thanks on the right that let me suffer for my land and my people, and say will all my existence: Blessed art thou, Lord our God, King of the Universe, who has granted us life, sustained us, and enabled us to reach this season! [the shehecheyanu blessing]"

On June 16 the court convened at 11:10. Lieutenant Colonel Norman, vice commander of the British forces in Palestine also attended the proceedings. The lawyers entered 15 minutes late and complained to the presiding judge about being subjected to a security check. This was part of the enormous ring of protection surrounding the court. The check even extended to cigarette cases, matches, and fountain pens.

In unison, the indicted parties sat bound and sang songs from the Betar Revisionist Zionist youth movement, which were translated for the many foreign journalists in attendance. The defendants entered the hall under heavy guard with chains on their hands and legs. It was reported that Haviv refused to raise his legs for the manacles to be put on and in a loud voice answered the British jailer "If the British mandate wants to put handcuffs on me, may it submit!" The shackles were only removed shortly before the assembly of the panel of the court. The accused reassured their families "We will yet laugh at them, and if not us, others will laugh." The presiding judge declared that all accused had been found guilty of discharging a firearm and illegally possessing explosives. At the request of the judges, lawyers brought forward documents concerning the ages of Michaelov and Nachman Zitterbaum.

Consultation over the verdict lasted for nearly two hours during which time observers and journalists were transferred by the police to a grated porch under the sun. The resentment of the journalists over this "confinement" didn't help. After two hours, the presiding judge entered the hall wearing a red hat, a sign that the verdict was death. He informed the condemned that they were sentenced to "hanging until their spirit departs". Amnon Michaelov and Nachman Zitterbaum were sentenced to imprisonment "until the commissioner chooses to free them" due to their youth. When they heard the verdict, the accused started singing, with the crowd in the hall joining them in a rendition of "Hatikvah". Immediately afterwards, the entire crowd was put onto the barred porch for three quarters of an hour until the jury left. It was reported that the crowd were told anyone trying to leave would "be shot where they stood". The condemned parties were loaded into an armored vehicle that then made its way to the Acre Prison. Haviv's mother exercised self-control when the verdict was declared and remained silent throughout.

According to the newspaper Davar, which carried out investigations in Haviv's household, his family had held on to the hope that he would be saved through a visit by the UN council. Haviv sent a message to his family: "We are ready to sabotage, the question is how ready are you for it?" On the 29th of Tammuz, anniversary of the release of Irgun leader Ze'ev Jabotinsky, Haviv and the two other condemned men were promoted from group leader (rosh kvutza) to sergeant (samal). The Irgun approached the UN council and asked them to annul the death sentence. This was in light of the UN calling on all sides to refrain from violence during the investigation, and also based on a similar event that had occurred in Greece along with the fact that no one from the security forces lost their life in the attack on the Acre Prison – the only victims were underground fighters. During the UN council investigation, support developed for intervention in the affair, but after the matter was brought to the chairman of the council and after stormy deliberations behind closed doors, it was decided on June 23 not to adopt a position contrary to the decision of the British mandate. A hostile government request for a conference concerning the three convicts worsened relations between the parties, and shortened the duration of the UN Council's stay. David Ben-Gurion, Chaim Weizmann, and the chief rabbis, all pleaded with the chief commissioner for amnesty. Many other bodies joined in the call for amnesty, including the council of the Sephardic union, the council of Ramat Gan, American students, and even the New York Post and Czech newspapers.

The convicted men passed their time in the chamber studying and reciting Psalms. When the prisoners' rabbi Aryeh Levin visited them they received him happily and asked him to report that they were in strong condition. On July 8 at 01:00 the army commander confirmed the verdicts. In due course the Irgun would capture two British sergeants and guarantee that if the death sentence went ahead, they would hang the sergeants as "an eye for an eye".

== Ascending the gallows ==
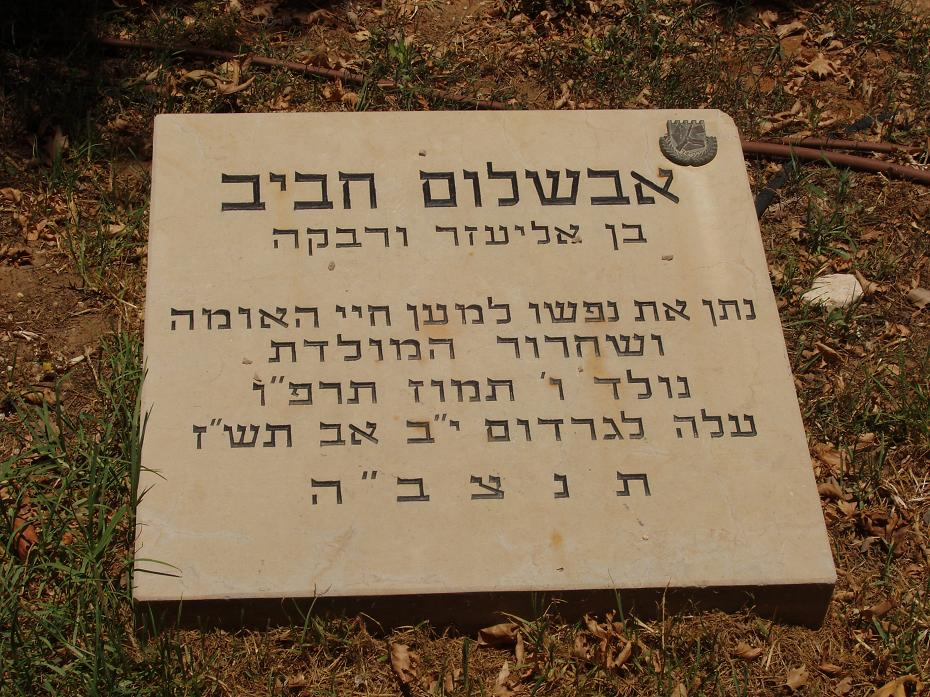
Monument on the grave of Avshalom Haviv

On the night of Monday, July 28, the prisoners heard the sound of the Hatikvah coming from the condemned men's cells. Suddenly the rumor spread that they would be hanged that night. Throughout the whole night the three condemned men sang songs of the underground and the rebellion. At 02:00, the chief Sephardic Rabbi of Haifa, Nissim Ohana, came to see them. He spent fifteen minutes encouraging them, although the Rabbi ended up being heartened by the prisoners. Amnon Michaelov, who was judged with them and was in Acre Prison at the same time testified:

"They called to us: 'Don't worry. Don't be ashamed. Be encouraged and strong. We are not afraid in the face of death.' Their last call was: 'Avenge our blood!' Don't worry for us. Thank you for what you said to us and for the warm well-wishes.' They are certainly strong. Strong like none who have been found in the Jewish people for two thousand years."

Michaelov says that later that night the doors of the corridor opened and the hangman approached the convicts' cell together with some policemen, a military doctor and the manager of the prison in Nablus.

Some time afterwards, prisoners once more heard the "Hatikvah" breaking from the area of the oubliette. All Jewish prisoners then joined in the singing, which rang throughout the building. After twenty minutes, at 04:00 on Tuesday, the prisoners heard Haviv singing Hatikvah as he was led to the gallows. His voice then stopped when he was hanged at 4:03. Haviv died on July 29 at the age of 21. Meir followed and like Haviv, sang until his last moments. Twenty minutes later his body was brought out, and at 04:25 Yaakov Weiss ascended the gallows, where he too sang the "Hatikvah" with other prisoners joining in.

== Aftermath ==
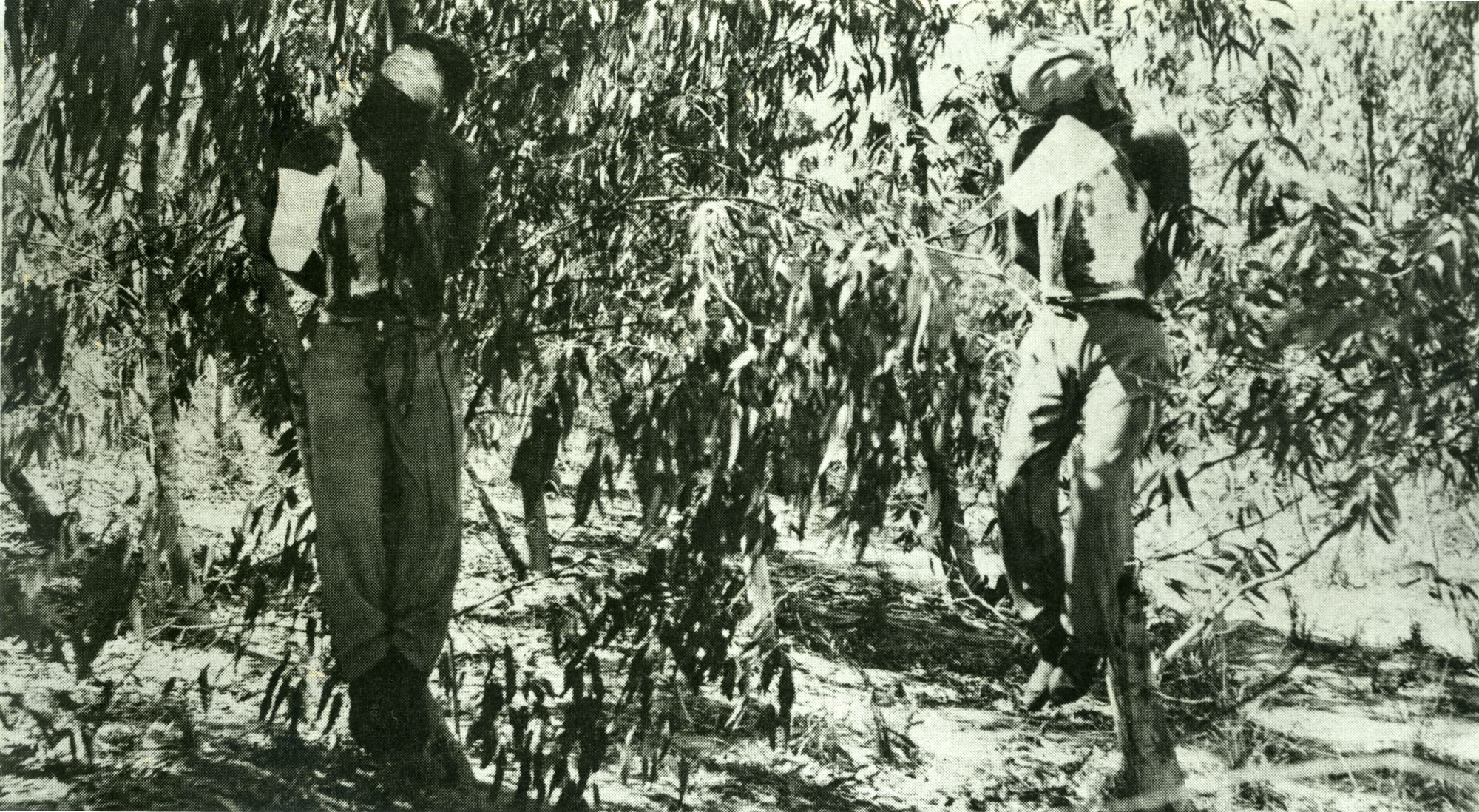
Two British soldiers hanged by the Irgun in retaliation

On the following day, July 30, at 10:00, the funeral cortege of the three fighters proceeded towards the graveyard in Safed Old Jewish Cemetery in a convoy led by a military vehicle followed by a family car and the "chevra kadisha". Nakar was first to be buried followed by Weiss and Haviv. The shock among Jewish communities in Mandatory Palestine was deep at the time, coming as it did on top of the SS Exodus incident.

Charlton resigned as manager of the Acre Prison on the same day. It is known that he refused to execute the men personally and a replacement had to be brought in.

On July 30, the Irgun carried out its threat to kill the two British sergeants it had kidnapped earlier. The soldiers were hanged and their bodies booby-trapped and left in a grove near Netanya. This operation shocked Britain, despite the explicit threat beforehand, and brought to an end hanging of Jews in the British Mandate of Palestine. Meir Nakar, Yaakov Weiss and Avshalom Haviv were the last to ascend the British gallows.

Today, Haviv, along with the other Olei Hagardom, is revered as a national hero in Israel. Streets have been named for him, and postage stamps bearing his image have been issued. The letters he wrote to his family and girlfriend Gila have since been compiled into a book titled Four Steps to the Gallows.

== See also ==
- Olei Hagardom
