= The Sergeants affair =

1947 incident in Mandate Palestine

Coordinates: 32°18′20″N 34°52′38″E

- Part of the Jewish insurgency in Mandatory Palestine
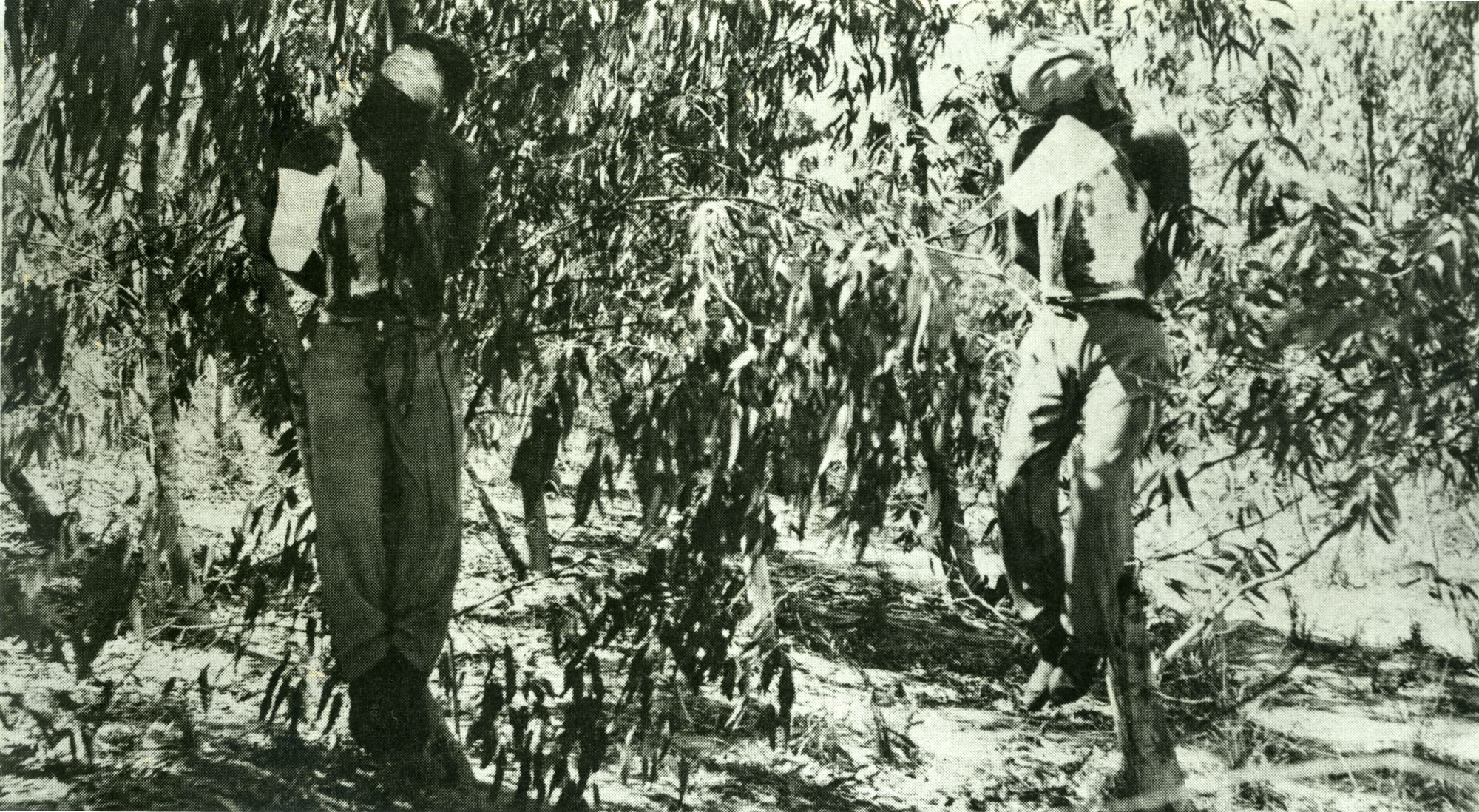
- The hanged bodies of Sergeants Clifford Martin (left) and Mervyn Paice (right)
Date	29-31 July 1947
Location	Mandatory Palestine
Result	British public opinion turns against the war in Palestine, leading to Britain's withdrawal; Anti-Jewish riots in the United Kingdom and reprisals against Jewish civilians in Palestine

Belligerents
Irgun	United Kingdom: Mandatory Palestine

Commanders and leaders
Menachem Begin; Amichai Paglin	(Mandatory Palestine) Gordon MacMillan

Casualties and losses
3 hanged	2 hanged 1 wounded
- 5 Jewish civilians killed in reprisals by British security forces

The Sergeants affair (Hebrew: פרשת הסרג'נטים) was a terrorist attack that took place in July 1947 during Jewish insurgency in Mandatory Palestine, in which the Zionist paramilitary organization Irgun abducted two British Army Intelligence Corps NCOs, Sergeant Clifford Martin and Sergeant Mervyn Paice, and threatened to hang them if the death sentences passed on three Irgun militants—Avshalom Haviv, Meir Nakar, and Yaakov Weiss—were carried out. The three had been captured by the British during the Acre Prison break, tried, and convicted on charges of illegal possession of arms, and with "intent to kill or cause other harm to a large number of people". When the three men were executed by hanging, the Irgun killed the two sergeants and hung their booby-trapped bodies in a eucalyptus grove near Netanya. When the bodies were found, the booby trap injured a British officer as they were cut down.

The crime was widely condemned in both Palestine and the United Kingdom. After news of the deaths became widely known, enraged British security forces rampaged in Tel Aviv, in which five Jews were killed and another 15 were wounded. Instances of anti-Jewish rioting and looting broke out in several British cities.

There is general consensus that the incident heavily contributed to Prime Minister Attlee's decision to permanently evacuate all British Forces until the end of the Jewish insurgency and the civil war between Jews and Arabs. The permanent evacuation of all British Forces in Palestine, along with the Palestine Police Force, created a power vacuum in the area, from which the 1948 Arab–Israeli War ensued after David Ben-Gurion declared Israeli independence the same day on which the British abandoned the area. Menachem Begin, the commander of Irgun, was barred from entry to the United Kingdom and rejected for a visa to the United States for many years afterwards.

== Background ==
In the late 1940s, as the third decade of British Mandate over Palestine was ending, many within and outside of Britain were calling to end the Mandate. They were led by opposition leader Winston Churchill, who denounced Britain's costly occupation of Palestine for no economic benefit.

Trying to maintain control and civil order (a Mandate requirement if nothing else), the British enacted the Defence Emergency Regulations in September 1945. These regulations suspended Habeas Corpus and established military courts. They prescribed the death penalty for various offences, including carrying weapons or ammunition illegally and membership in an organisation whose members commit these offences. As World War II ended, a Jewish insurgency began, with the Zionist groups Irgun and Lehi attacking British targets in order to compel the British to leave Palestine. The insurgency was a response to Britain's implementation of the White Paper of 1939, which greatly restricted Jewish immigration and land purchases.

The British authorities began applying the death penalty against captured Jewish militants. The first member of a Jewish underground group, Shlomo Ben-Yosef, was executed in 1938 for his part in an unsuccessful shooting attack on Arab civilians who were travelling on a bus.

During an Irgun attack on a British military base, Irgun fighters Michael Ashbel and Yosef Simchon were arrested. They were sentenced to death on 13 June 1946. There were many pleas and petitions for clemency by various institutes and Jewish leaders, which were not effective. Irgun decided to threaten to carry out its own "gallows regime", declaring a policy of reprisal killings. Five days later, Irgun kidnapped five British officers in Tel Aviv, and another one the following day in Jerusalem. The Irgun then threatened to hang its hostages if Ashbel and Simchoni were executed. Two weeks later, following intense and secret negotiations, Ashbel and Simchon's sentences were commuted to life imprisonment. The officers were released the next day.

In January 1947 another Irgun militant, Dov Gruner, was sentenced to death for shooting and placing explosives with intent to kill during an Irgun raid on a Palestine Police Force station in Ramat Gan in April 1946. On 26 January, two days before Gruner's scheduled execution, Irgun kidnapped a British intelligence officer in Jerusalem. The next day, on 27 January, Irgun men also kidnapped a British judge, Ralph Windham, who was president of the Tel Aviv District Court. 16 hours before the scheduled execution, the British forces commander announced an "indefinite delay" of the sentence, and Irgun released its hostages.

Meanwhile in Britain, Churchill, now the leader of the Opposition, demanded a special meeting on the subject, and on 31 January 1947, a four-hour discussion in the British Parliament took place, with Churchill demanding the suppression of the "terrorists in Palestine".

On 16 April 1947, Gruner and three other Irgun militants, Yehiel Dresner, Mordechai Alkahi and Eliezer Kashani, who were caught during the Night of the Beatings, were executed. Five days later two other prisoners, Meir Feinstein of Irgun and Moshe Barazani of Lehi, were scheduled to be hanged for, respectively, the bombing of a Jerusalem railway station in which a policeman was killed and the attempted assassination of a senior British officer. However, a few hours before they were due to be executed they committed suicide using an improvised grenade smuggled to them by their colleagues. Irgun commander Menachem Begin was enraged by the executions, and ordered his men to abduct and hang British soldiers in retaliation. However, the British Army, well aware of possible retaliation, took precautions. As Begin would later recall, "our units went out on the roads, on to the streets in the towns. But the military were literally not to be found."

4 May 1947 saw the Acre Prison break: the Irgun engineered a mass escape from Acre Prison, with the aim of freeing 41 Irgun and Lehi prisoners. Some 28 Jews and almost 200 Arabs managed to escape. However, nine Jewish fighters (both escapees and perpetrators of the prison break) were killed. Among the attacking party, three were killed and five were captured. While two of those arrested, Amnon Michaelov and Nachman Zitterbaum, were minors, and thus too young to be executed under British law, the other three, Avshalom Haviv, Yaakov Weiss and Meir Nakar, were not. The Irgun High Command had no doubt that they would be tried and convicted of capital offences, and the Irgun immediately set out to find British hostages. All of the arrested Irgun militants refused to accept British judicial authority. However they were tried by a military court and Haviv, Weiss, and Nakar were sentenced to death.

In an attempt to forestall the likely death sentences, the Irgun kidnapped two British military policemen, a sergeant and a private, at a swimming pool in Ramat Gan on 9 June. However, the attempt to use them as hostages failed, as 19 hours later British troops found the hiding place and rescued them. Two days later the three Irgun militants were sentenced to death. All that was needed for the sentences to be carried out was approval from the Commander in Chief. Irgun resumed, with increased urgency, its kidnapping attempts, which proved difficult due to British precautions against abductions: British soldiers were largely confined to heavily-guarded security zones that had been established throughout Palestine, and standing orders required troops to move around in groups of at least four. Matters were further complicated by Lehi's actions in retaliation to the killing of one of their members, Alexander Rubowitz, who was allegedly murdered in captivity by Major Roy Farran. Lehi decided to carry out revenge attacks and the Irgun was concerned over the fact that it would be even more difficult to find hostages if Lehi began gun battles in the streets. Lehi agreed to hold off its attacks for a week, and Irgun carried out two unsuccessful abduction attempts. The first, on 22 June, saw Assistant Superintendent of Police C.J.C. Pound escape from his would-be captors in Jerusalem. On 25 June, an abduction squad in Jerusalem attempted to seize administrative officer Alan Major and hit him on the head with a hammer, but Major managed to struggle free. After the week passed, Lehi carried out two attacks in Tel Aviv and Haifa which killed two British soldiers and wounded five. These attacks resulted in even tighter security precautions.

UNSCOP (the United Nations committee which was asked to recommend the future government of Palestine) visited the region and an appeal was made to the committee to intervene on the convicted men's behalf. On 2 July, an appeal by UNSCOP on behalf of the condemned men was rejected, and on 8 July, three weeks after the sentences were passed, they were confirmed by the commander. Due to the concurrent visit of UNSCOP the executions were postponed.

== Kidnapping ==
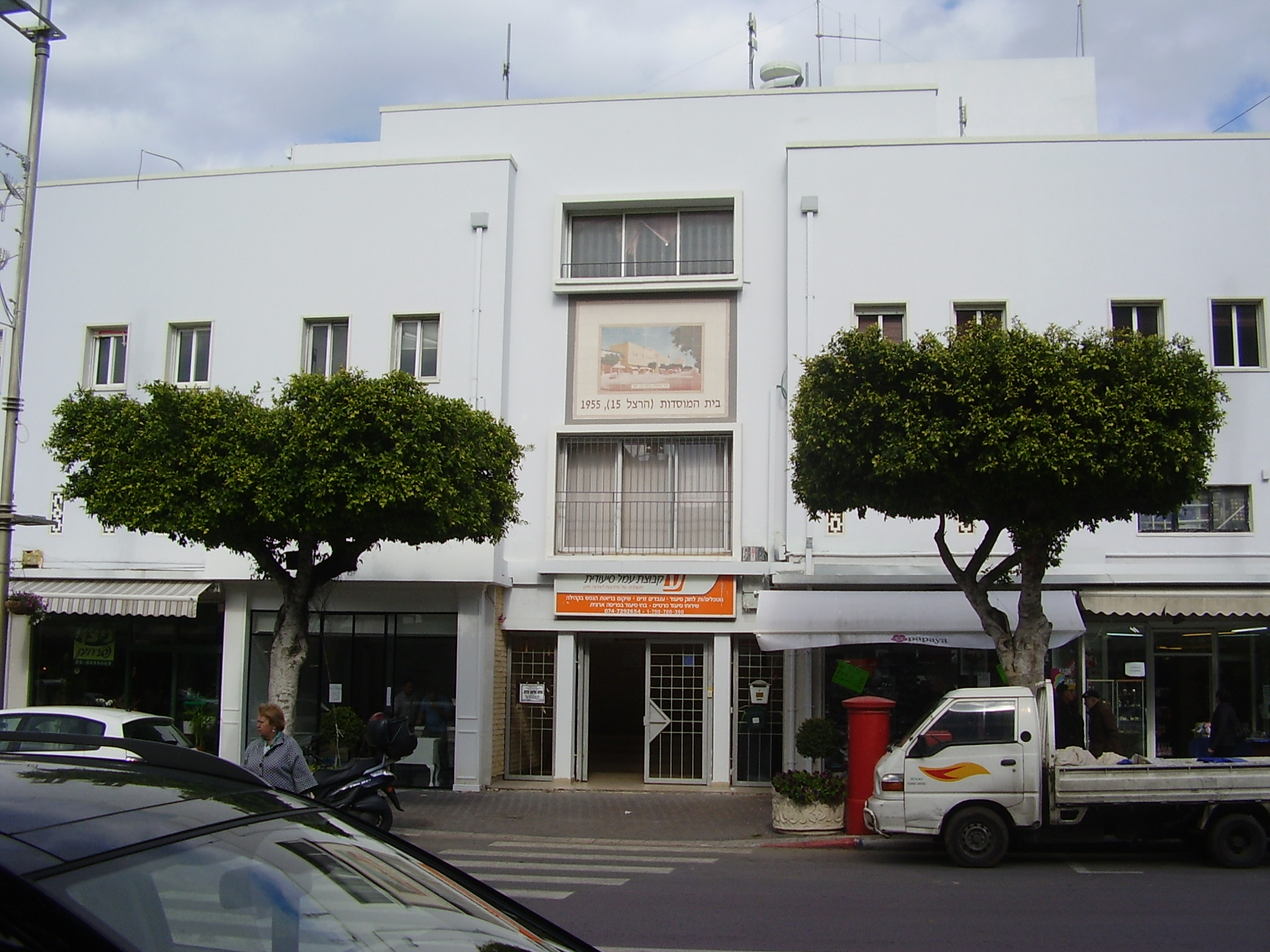
The site of the abduction

Several weeks earlier, Irgun had learned about a Jewish refugee from Vienna named Aaron Weinberg, who had fled to Palestine and was working as a clerk at a British military resort camp in north Netanya. This information was already known to the local SHAI (the intelligence arm of the Haganah) commander, Yehoshua Bar-Ziv. Weinberg, who was a SHAI agent, was entrusted by Bar-Ziv with striking up a relationship with two sergeants from the British Army Intelligence Corps, Clifford Martin and Mervyn Paice, who used to spend a lot of time in the camp.

The sergeants were of interest to SHAI since they belonged to the field security unit and worked with the Tulkarm police, which was in charge of the Sharon district. Their mission was to circulate within the local population and pick up information on the Irgun and Lehi and their supporters. They often operated in civilian clothes and were not subject to standing orders intended to prevent abduction attempts. Notably, they did not have to leave camp in groups of four, and sometimes went unarmed. Weinberg was very successful in his task, and occasionally got the sergeants to go out to the Netanya beach.

On one of those visits, on the night of Saturday, 4 July, they were noted by an Irgun member sitting in the Gan Vered café who heard them speaking English and who followed them back to the camp. Based on his information, a week later Irgun made arrangements to kidnap them in the hope that they would return to the café.

On 11 July 1947, a group of Irgun men retrieved weapons, chloroform, cloths and ropes from a hidden cache. After the recent failures, the Irgun militants in Netanya were sceptical regarding the chances of this kidnapping attempt. Because of this they did not go to any great lengths to cover their tracks, considering the complicated operation they were planning: they did not steal or borrow a vehicle or bring in non-local members who were less likely to be recognised. Furthermore, Yosef Meller, a longtime Netanya resident and newly recruited Irgun member, volunteered to use his black taxi cab, which was well known around town, for the kidnapping. The abduction operation was led by Benjamin Kaplan, who had been freed in the Acre Prison break. At nightfall one basic precaution was taken; the taxi's licence plates were changed in an attempt to prevent it being recognised in the course of the abduction.

That evening Weinberg and the intended victims showed up once more at the café. Martin and Paice were in civilian clothes, were unarmed, were outside their camp at hours typically forbidden for British soldiers to be outside camp, and were not part of a group of four. After being informed that his intended victims were there, Kaplan posted his men around the coffee shop and along the road leading north to the camp and waited for an opportunity to perform the abduction. Weinberg and the two sergeants did not leave the coffee shop until after midnight. The two sergeants had decided to walk Weinberg home before returning to camp. Meller's cab, with Kaplan and three others inside, started after them. It pulled over and the four men emerged, masked and holding guns, and assaulted their targets. After resistance by one of the sergeants, they were forced into the car and Meller drove off. Weinberg was left, under guard, in an orchard in north Netanya, from where he was later taken to another orchard and released.

The hostages were taken to the inactive "Feldman" diamond polishing plant in the industrial area on the south side of Netanya, and were held in a specially-built underground chamber that had been built in the plant's cellar. It was sealed with an aluminium-ringed airtight hatch that was hidden by a thick layer of sand, and there were sandbags under the hatch to prevent any hollow sound if it were tapped. Inside was a canvas bucket, a week's supply of food and two cylinders of oxygen which the sergeants were instructed to use to refresh the air in their cell. Every few days while they were there, the bucket was emptied and the food restocked.

== The search for Paice and Martin ==
Weinberg remained in the orchard until daybreak, and was found by a watchman at 5:30 AM. He reported the kidnapping to the British Army. Shortly afterwards he was interviewed by the Palestine Police Force, and gave them the details of what had happened. Reports of the kidnapping also reached the Haganah in Netanya. Oved Ben-Ami, the mayor of Netanya, called an emergency council meeting. He did not invite the Revisionist party members, who were identified with the Irgun. The decision was made in accordance with the Yishuv's position, which was published the next day, calling the kidnapping a provocation that might jeopardise what hope was left for clemency for the Irgun members condemned to death. It pleaded for every decent civilian to assist in the search for the hostages.

Meanwhile, Haganah set out to find and release the kidnapped men, by force if necessary. Until that time period, the Haganah had avoided collaboration with the British authorities since the end of the Saison, and on occasion, it had mounted anti-British operations and collaborated with the Irgun and Lehi. However, in the summer of 1947, it began trying to sabotage Irgun and Lehi operations as part of the "Little Saison" due to the fact that UNSCOP was present in Palestine at the time. As a result, it assisted in the search. The SHAI commander in the region arrived in order to personally oversee the search. Unlike the British, the Haganah was familiar with the area, and knew every potential hideout within a ten-mile radius. Despite this, it found no trace of the hostages. Searches by the Jewish Settlement Police and the Palestine Police's Criminal Investigations Department were also fruitless.

Yehoshua Bar-Ziv, who had resigned as SHAI commander in Netanya in the meantime, provided his successor with information about a recently built underground bunker under the house of Irgun member Haim Banai in Ramat Tiomkin. They were convinced that this was where the hostages were kept, and passed that information to Haganah.

All the while, Ben-Ami was desperately trying to pacify the British authorities and promise them that Yishuv would do anything to find the hostages. However, after his conversation with Netanya council members of the Revisionist party, he published an announcement in a newspaper saying that he had been told by Irgun that the hostages would not be returned until the condemned Irgun members' fate was made clear. Subsequently, the British Army placed a cordon around Netanya and the surrounding area of Emek Hefer, which had 20 outlying settlements, a total area of 15,000 people, and on 13 July, began an extensive search effort, codenamed Operation Tiger, to find the sergeants. The area was placed under martial law as 5,000 British troops conducted searches and questioned residents. A total of 1,427 people were interrogated during the operation. Local residents were kept under curfew, and Netanya became a virtual ghost town; its streets were empty save for patrolling British soldiers and armoured vehicles.

At this point Haganah believed that they had accurate information on the location of the hostages. The information made it all the way up to the Haganah chief of staff, Yisrael Galili who passed it on to the Haganah high commander and chairman of the Jewish Agency, David Ben-Gurion. Although the Haganah, acting under the Jewish Agency's direction, had at times cooperated with the Irgun and Lehi and carried out anti-British operations, it was at the time conducting the "Little Saison" against the two groups, attempting to suppress their activities by foiling some of their operations. Galili, who opposed any collaboration with the British, had ordered preparations for a forced release by the Haganah. Ben-Gurion thought that a forced release, no matter by whom, would lead to the hanging of the condemned in Acre, and Irgun's finger would be pointed at the Agency, Haganah and SHAI. He therefore made two decisions: First, the hostages were to be released by force; but not by Haganah, as Galili suggested, but by the British. Second, the information regarding the location of the hostages was to be passed anonymously not only to the British, but to Ben-Ami as well. By doing this he hoped to give the impression that Ben Ami had passed the information to the British. Ben-Gurion was relying on this, plus Ben Ami's call to the Netanya residents "to leave no stone unturned" to attract reprisals from Irgun if the hostages were rescued.

On 17 July, British MPs Richard Crossman and Maurice Edelman appealed for the release of the sergeants, as did other public figures and private citizens in Britain. The father of Mervyn Paice wrote a letter to Menachem Begin asking him to spare his son's life. The letter was sent to Palestine addressed to the commander of the Irgun. In Palestine, a postal worker who was a member of the Irgun ensured it found its way to Begin, who in an open radio broadcast on Kol Tsion HaLokhemet (the Irgun's radio station) responded "You must appeal to your government that thirsts for oil and blood."

=== Leak of information to Irgun ===
Ben-Gurion's plan did not work. In the course of a meeting with Revisionist party member Yaakov Chinsky, Ben Ami told him that Haganah knew the kidnapped soldiers were being imprisoned under Banai's house. Chinsky, who knew the information was wrong, passed it to Avraham Assaf, the Irgun's district commander in the Netanya area. Assaf knew the hostages were not in Banai's cellar, but it did contain the equipment used in the kidnapping, and he thought its discovery might assist the British in finding the kidnappers or their hostages. He therefore arranged to have the evidence removed.

The next day, during the extension given by the British to the Yishuv for the Haganah to conduct its own search, the residents of Netanya were placed under curfew. The British, acting on the information from Haganah, decided to search Banai's house. In the late afternoon the neighbourhood was surrounded by military vehicles, including tanks and armoured cars. Banai and his neighbours were arrested as searches began. However, as the equipment had already been removed, nothing was found.

All the while the hostages were kept in the polishing plant. They had been drugged with chloroform during their abduction and when they came to, Kaplan told them they had been taken hostage. On the advice of Amichai Paglin, the Irgun's Chief of Operations, who arrived from Tel Aviv on the day of the kidnapping, a decoy was arranged: a pick-up truck was loaded with kidnapping equipment and sent to Herzliya, where it was left at the beach, leaving clear traces. Paglin also arranged for oxygen tanks to be brought to the bunker, before returning to Tel Aviv.

=== Near discovery of hostages by police ===
The diamond polishing plant where the hostages were being held was searched twice by the British, but both searches failed to turn up the hostages.

A few hours after Paglin's departure, an incident took place that could have led to the discovery of the hostages: the two lookouts at the plant noticed a police car patrolling the area. Fearing it was heading towards the plant, they hid themselves. The police car was on routine patrol and went on its way, but the guard in the nearby plant noticed them slipping through the window, assumed they were burglars, and called the police.

On an ordinary day the police might not have taken his report seriously, but this time a strong force was sent to investigate, accompanied by a plainclothes officer. They conducted a search of the plant. However, one of the plant's owners, who did not know about Irgun's unauthorised use of his property, naively convinced them there was nothing in there to concern them. Having found nothing, the policemen left the scene.

The plant was later searched a second time by a British patrol. As the soldiers pushed open the doors, an Irgun guard inside heard them and escaped through a back window. The soldiers heard him and conducted a painstaking search of the plant, but failed to find the hatch.

== Hangings ==
=== Execution of Haviv, Weiss and Nakar ===
On 16 July, after three days, the curfew around Netanya was lifted, although the town itself remained isolated. The search continued unsuccessfully, but the cordon was lifted after two weeks, on 26 July. Ben Ami assessed that the British had resolved to hang the condemned men despite the risk to the hostages.

Ben Ami's assessment was correct. On 27 July an official radio announcement said the High Commissioner, Alan Cunningham had given the order to carry out the executions, which were scheduled for 29 July. The superintendent of Acre Prison, Major G.E.G. Charlton, refused to preside over the executions due to the fact that they were to be carried out in secret, rather than in the traditional way, with the execution date announced well in advance and the families of the condemned allowed to visit them prior to the event. He was subsequently relieved of his position. The Inspector of Prisons, Mr. Hackett, was appointed superintendent in his place, and he along with Andrew Clow, the superintendent of Nablus jail, would serve as the chief hangman. On 28 July, it was announced that the three would die the following day. The announcement cast a pall over the Yishuv. The Jewish Agency and Palestine's Ashkenazi Chief Rabbi Yitzhak Herzog made last-ditch appeals for the lives of the men to be spared, but to no avail. The Irgun immediately reiterated its warning that the hostages would also die in response. British forces carried out unsuccessful, last-ditch searches in Jerusalem, Kfar Saba, and Ness Ziona for the two sergeants.

On 29 July, at the break of dawn, Haviv, Weiss and Nakar were executed. At 2:00 AM, they were visited by Rabbi Nissim Ohana, the Chief Rabbi of Haifa, who administered final prayers to them and carried out a message to their family and friends: "Do not grieve too much, what we have done we did out of conviction." Shortly before 4:00 AM, the prison superintendent, accompanied by high military and police officials, arrived at the death cell. Between 4:00 and 5:00, each man was escorted to the gallows and hanged. As they approached the gallows, they sang Hatikvah and were joined by other Jewish prisoners. The bodies were left hanging from the gallows for twenty minutes before being cut down and carried away. Haviv, Weiss, and Nakar thereby became the last of the group known as the Olei Hagardom. In a letter to Menachem Begin, an Irgun prisoner named Chaim Wasserman described the executions:

"Early this morning our three comrades went heroically to the gallows. We were already aware of what was going to happen between four and five in the morning and pressed against the bars with bated breath watching haplessly what was going on around the cell. The prison superintendent, Major Charlton, had left the place yesterday afternoon and was not seen again. Toward evening a party of hangmen arrived. The officers went in and informed the condemned men they were to be executed between four and five in the morning. Their reply was to sing "Hatikvah" and other songs in powerful voices. They then shouted to us that the hangings would begin at four o'clock, in this order: Avshalom Haviv, Meir Nakar, Yaakov Weiss. They added: 'Avenge our blood! Avenge our blood!' We shouted back, 'Be strong! We are with you, and thousands of Jewish youth are with you in spirit.' They replied, 'Thanks,' and went on singing. At two a Sephardi rabbi whom we could not recognize from afar was brought and stayed in the cell 15 minutes. At four in the morning Avshalom began singing "Hatikva," and we joined in loudly, pressing against the bars. At once armed police came up to the visitors' fence near our cell. At 4:03 Avshalom was hanged. At 4:25 we were shaken by the powerful singing of Meir. Hardly able to breathe, we nevertheless joined in. He was hanged at 4:28. At five o'clock the voice of Yaakov, this time alone, penetrated our cell, singing "Hatikva." Again we joined in. Two minutes later he was hanged. Each of the bodies was left hanging twenty minutes before being carried off, one by one. The chief hangmen were Hackett, Inspector of Prisons, and Clow, superintendent of the Nablus jail. At dawn we informed the prison officers through an Arab warder that we would not be responsible for the life of any Englishman who dared enter the jail yard. We declared a fast and prayed. Later in the morning we found the following inscription on the wall of the cell of the condemned: 'They will not frighten the Hebrew youth in the Homeland with their hangings. Thousands will follow in our footsteps.' Next to it was the Irgun insignia and their three names in the order they were executed."

On 30 July, the three men were buried in Safed. Their funeral cortege was led by a military vehicle. The entire Jewish population of Safed attended the funeral.

=== Killing of Paice and Martin ===
When news began leaking that the three men were to be executed and a country-wide curfew would be imposed at 11:00 PM, Paglin was at a movie. After being called out and told the news, he hurried to Begin's safe house, where he was meeting with members of his high command, where doubts were being raised over the feasibility of hanging the sergeants with the British and Haganah on high alert. Paglin, who had not been allowed to venture into British-controlled areas by the high command for the previous six months, asked to take personal charge of the operation. He was convinced that the sergeants could be hanged inside the plant, and the bodies could be moved to an orange grove and hung there, since attempting to move the two alive would be too great a risk. Since the hangings were meant as a 'lesson for all to see', Irgun wanted the bodies hung up in public. That was so clear that the mayor of Tel Aviv, Israel Rokach, feared Irgun would hang them in the city's main square, while in Netanya it was feared that they would be hanged on local lamp posts. Begin approved Paglin's plan. Paglin then slipped out of the house and drove to Netanya in his car, where he collected four Irgun men; Benjamin Kaplan, Yoel Kimchi, Avraham Rubin, and Yosef Meller. They arrived at the diamond plant in the afternoon.

In Netanya, they had observed that the streets were filled with British military vehicles patrolling the town, and as a result, they were in a rush to carry out the hangings quickly, lest they get caught in the act. Starting at around 6:00 PM, Paice and Martin were individually taken out of the hatch, hustled into the next room, hooded, tied by the wrists and ankles, stood on a chair, had a noose placed around their necks and then, by the kicking away of the chair, hanged. The first man to be pulled out asked if he could write a message, but was told that there was no time. After twenty minutes, the bodies were taken down.

=== Movement of the bodies ===
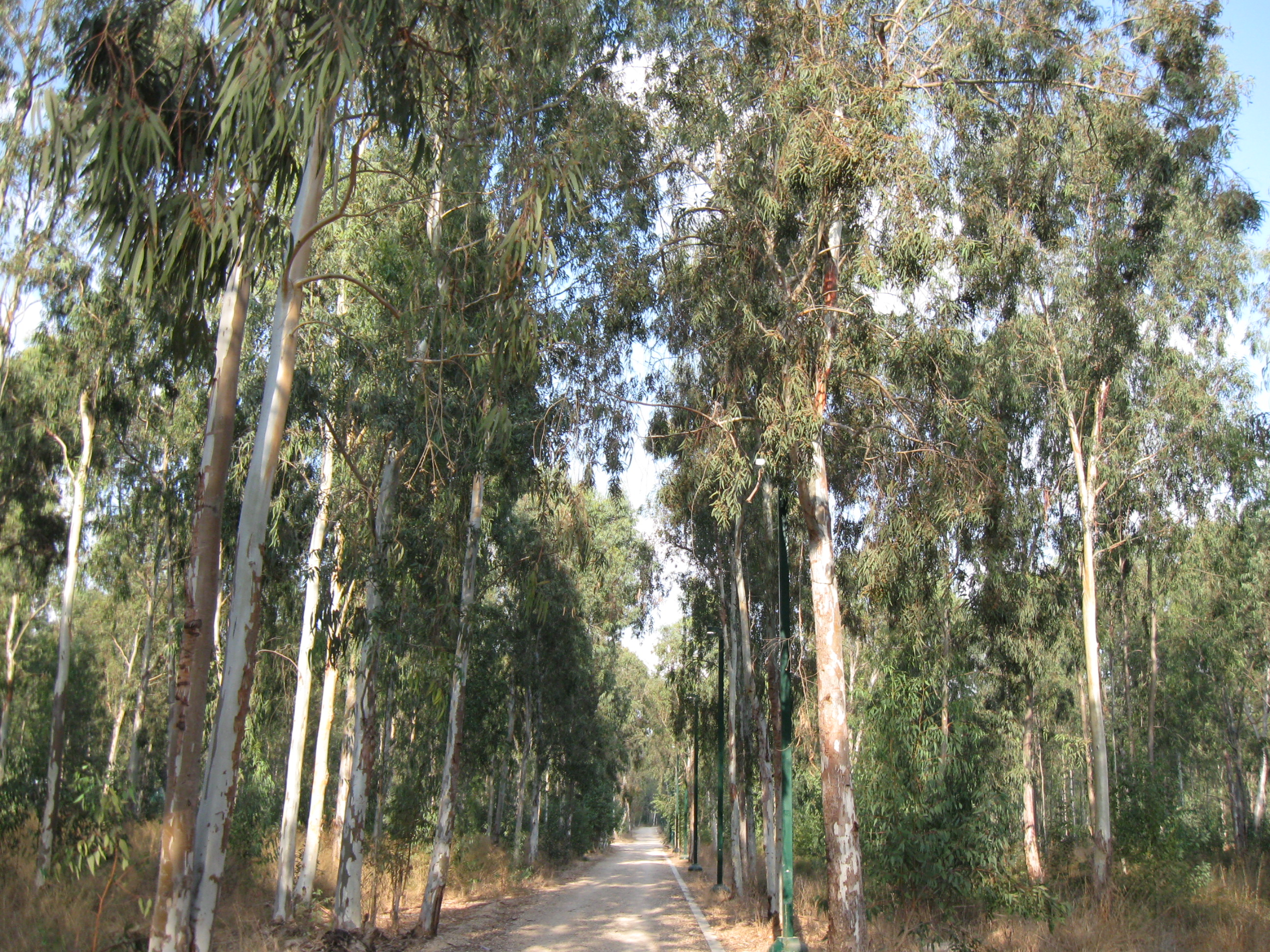
The grove where the sergeants' bodies were hanged

The next day, early in the morning of 30 July, a taxi brought from Tel Aviv, so as not to be recognised, arrived at the plant. Meanwhile Meller was looking for a route to move the bodies without risking arrest. After several hours such a route was found, and at 9:00 the order was given to move the bodies into the cab. The Irgun group concealed the bodies in bags and moved them out of the plant in broad daylight. They were seen doing this by workers at the neighbouring plants.

Many of those were Haganah members, and several of them asked what was in the bags. The Irgun members lied, saying that the bags contained guns, at which point some of the workers suggested that they should be confiscated. One of the Irgun men, David Dahari, took out his pistol and threatened to fire if any of them touched the bags, so they backed off.

From that point time was critical for the Irgun group; it was clearly a matter of time before SHAI—and the British—were informed that Irgun were moving possible bodies. They drove east to a eucalyptus grove near the village of Even Yehuda, about four km from Netanya. They hung the bodies from two adjacent trees and pinned notes to them which read:

Two British spies held in underground captivity since July 12 have been tried after the completion of the investigations of their "criminal anti-Hebrew activities" on the following charges: Illegal entry into the Hebrew homeland. Membership of a British criminal terrorist organisation known as the Army of Occupation which was responsible for the torture, murder, deportation, and denying the Hebrew people the right to live. Illegal possession of arms. Anti-Jewish spying in civilian clothes. Premeditated hostile designs against the underground. Found guilty of these charges they have been sentenced to hang and their appeal for clemency dismissed. This is not a reprisal for the execution of three Jews but a "routine judicial fact."

An anti-personnel mine was then set. Most accounts say that this was buried below the bodies, where it would have targeted anyone cutting them down.

== Reactions in Palestine ==
At 11:00 on 30 July the Irgun publicly announced the hangings with an announcement on its clandestine radio station and on posters pasted on walls throughout Palestine. The British security forces and Haganah searched intensively for the bodies, but had not found them by the end of the day. Fearing that the mine they had planted might injure a Haganah patrol, the Irgun telephoned the Netanya town council, giving the location of the bodies and a warning about the mine.

The bodies were located by a Jewish Settlement Police patrol, who, because of the warning, stayed clear. At 5:30 AM on 31 July, the policemen reported having seen two corpses hanging from eucalyptus trees but that they had not approached them. About three hours later, police, a British Army unit of the Welsh Guards, civilian officials, and journalists arrived at the scene. They observed that the bodies had been partly stripped, their shirts wrapped around their heads and that the bodies appeared "blackened, bloodied."

Having thoroughly checked the surrounding area, the officer in command, Captain D.H. Galatti, began cutting down the body of Clifford Martin using a knife fastened to a pole. When it fell, the mine went off, blowing Martin's body to pieces and knocking sideways the tree from which Paice's body was hung. Despite jumping back, the captain received wounds to his face and a shoulder.

According to a Palestine Police report:

They were hanging from two eucalyptus trees five yards apart. Their faces were heavily bandaged so it was impossible to distinguish their features... Their bodies were a dull black colour and blood had run down their chests which made it appear at first that they had been shot.... The press were allowed to take photographs of the spectacle. When this had been done, it was decided to cut down the bodies. The RE [Royal Engineers] captain and CSM [company sergeant major] lopped branches off the tree which held the right hand body, and started to cut the hang rope with a saw. As the body fell there was a large explosion... The two trees had been completely blown up and their [sic] were large craters where the roots had been. One body was found horribly mangled about twenty yards away... The other body had disintegrated, and small pieces were picked up as much as 200 yards away.

As news regarding the bodies became known throughout Netanya, the residents, fearing reprisals, began stocking food and some even left the city. The council called upon the residents not to believe false rumours.

Shmuel Katz delivered a statement to the Irgun press:

We recognize no one-sided laws of war. If the British are determined that their way out of the country should be lined by an avenue of gallows and of weeping fathers, mothers, wives, and sweethearts, we shall see to it that in this there is no racial discrimination. The gallows will not be all of one color.... Their price will be paid in full.

The first response came from Ben-Ami, who said that "of all the crimes committed to this day in this country this is the most despicable one, defiling our war of liberation.... I testify that most of our population made desperate efforts to free the kidnapped and prevent this disgrace."

The Yishuv's official institutions gave similar responses, condemning the perpetrators as murderers of two innocent persons, who took upon themselves the authority to decide in life and death issues.

The American consul in Jerusalem Robert Macatee wrote regarding the affair that:

During the time of the Nazis it was a commonplace to hear the opinion that Hitler and his followers were deluded to the point where their sanity was questionable. If such generalizations are permissible, it may be well to question whether the Zionists, in their present emotional state, can be dealt with as rational human beings.

=== Reprisals by British security forces ===
On the evening of 31 July, groups of British policemen and soldiers went on the rampage in Tel Aviv, breaking the windows of shops and buses, overturning cars, stealing a taxi and assaulting members of the Jewish community. Groups of young Jews then took to the streets and started stoning police foot patrols, which were then withdrawn from the city.

On learning of the stonings, without waiting for orders, members of mobile police units temporarily based at the Citrus House security compound drove into Tel Aviv in six armoured vehicles. These policemen opened fire on two buses, killing one Jew and injuring three others on the first bus and killing three more Jews on the second. Policemen also beat passersby, smashed shop windows, and raided two cafés, detonating a grenade in one of them. In one café, they attempted to abduct a Jew, and were beaten back by the patrons. Five Jews were killed and 15 injured. The dead were identified as Tova Harson, Victor Yedidia Mizrahi, Ze'ev Novakovsky, Kalman Reich, and Yosef Azpai.

Investigators tried to find who was responsible for the killings, examining each armoured car's guns and ammunition, but the guns had been cleaned and ammunition replenished. Members of the regular mobile patrols who must have known the truth were interrogated, but refused to divulge any information. In the end, a few policemen were disciplined and the Lydda mobile police units reformed, but no criminal charges were brought.

On 1 August, Paice and Martin were buried in the Ramleh Commonwealth War Graves Commission cemetery, while at the funeral for some of the Jews killed in the police reprisals, mourners and police clashed again; one Jew was killed and 33 more Jews were injured.

Reprisals against the Yishuv by members of the security forces continued into the following month. On 1 August, a man was killed in Rishon LeZion when a group of Jews standing at a soft drink stand was fired on from a British military vehicle. Jewish policemen called to the scene were also shot at by British soldiers, with none injured. On 29 August, a nine-year old child was killed when a Jewish settlement was fired on from a nearby British Army camp.

=== Government reactions ===
On 5 August, the British arrested 35 Jewish political leaders in Palestine, all of whom were members of the Revisionist party or the right-wing branch of the General Zionists' party. The mayors of Netanya, Tel Aviv, and Ramat Gan were among those arrested due to them being "known to be able to contact the terrorists." They were held without trial in the Latrun detention camp. The British authorities also announced that henceforth, all Palestinian Jews were forbidden to leave the country until further notice. A long-standing plan to outlaw the Revisionist youth movement Betar as a fertile recruiting ground for the Irgun and Lehi was implemented. Betar's headquarters were occupied, and Revisionist newspapers were shut down.

Cunningham authorised the British Army to begin demolishing Jewish homes, a tactic it had previously failed to use during the Jewish insurgency. A Jewish home where an arms cache had been discovered in a routine search was demolished in Jerusalem on 5 August.

== Reactions in Britain ==
=== Public and media reaction ===
Condemnations of the Irgun came from all sections of British society and media. Under the headline 'Murder in Palestine' The Times commented that: 'it is difficult to estimate the damage that will be done to the Jewish cause not only in this country but throughout the world by the cold-blooded murder of the two British soldiers.... The Manchester Guardian, while urging the government that it was 'time to go' from Palestine, similarly noted that the hangings were 'a greater blow to the Jewish nation than to the British government.'

=== Condemnation of the Irgun by British Jews ===
The Jewish Chronicle reported on the issue. In one passage, the JC expressed Anglo-Jewry's shame at the act: 'Although the general public in Britain recognise that Jewry in this country are powerless to prevent the outrages, British Jewry cannot but feel a deep sense of shame that these murders have been committed.' Harold Soref, the editor of the Jewish Monthly, complained that "the victims of Hitler are being replaced in the popular imagination and sentiment by the victims of the Irgun Zvai Leumi."

JC editor John Shaftesley's words, while articulating Anglo-Jewry's abhorrence, can also be interpreted as a plea to British society not to blame Anglo-Jewry for the 'cold-blooded murder of the two British sergeants,' or to seek revenge against the community. Shaftesley's plea was ignored by some, and during the bank holiday weekend, which began on 1 August 1947, and throughout the following week, British Jews across the country felt the powerful impact of the incident, facing a sharp rise in hatred, abuse and ultimately rioting.

=== Riots ===
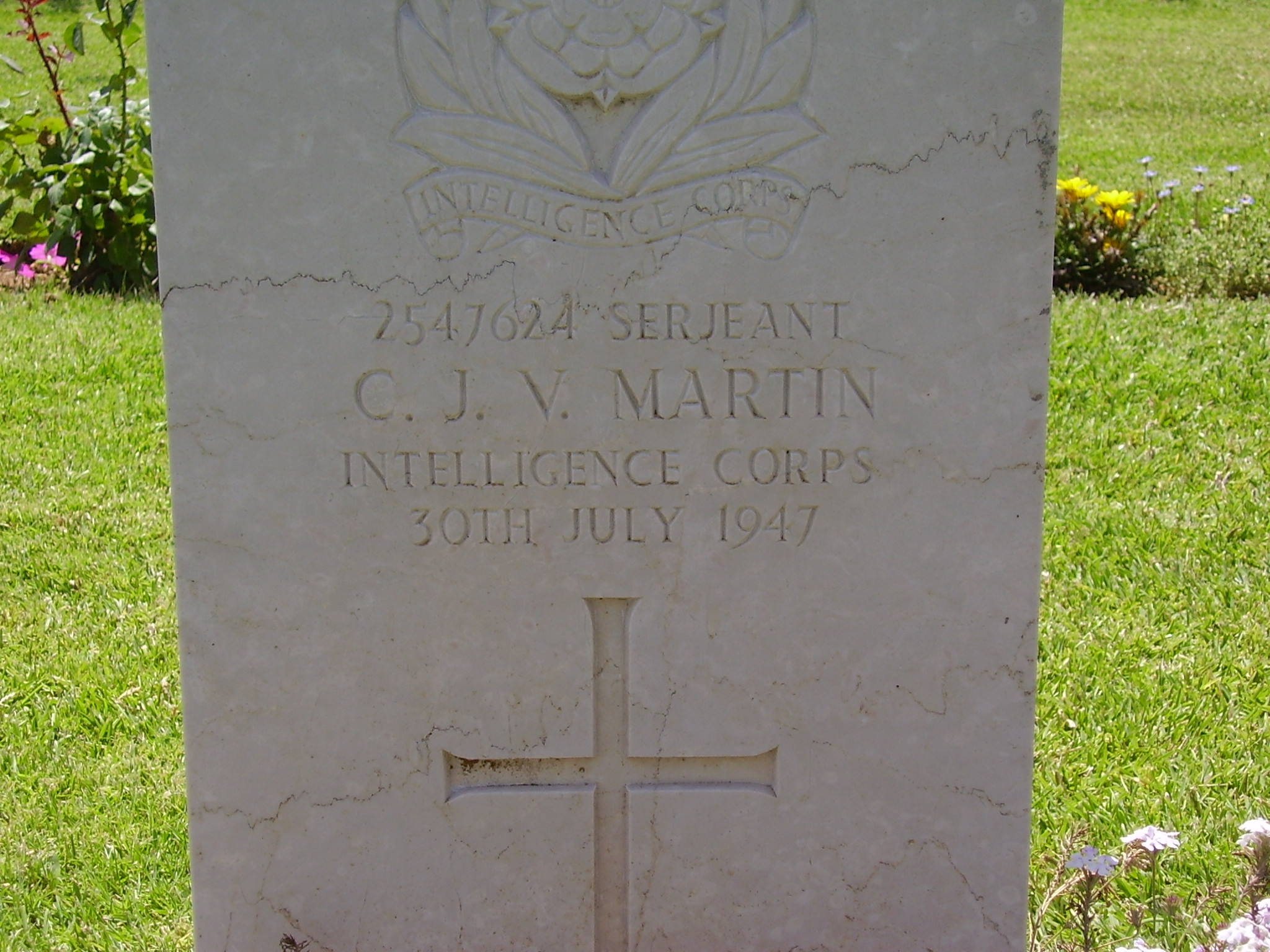
Headstone of Sergeant Clifford Martin (INT CORPS) in Ramla British Military Cemetery, Israel

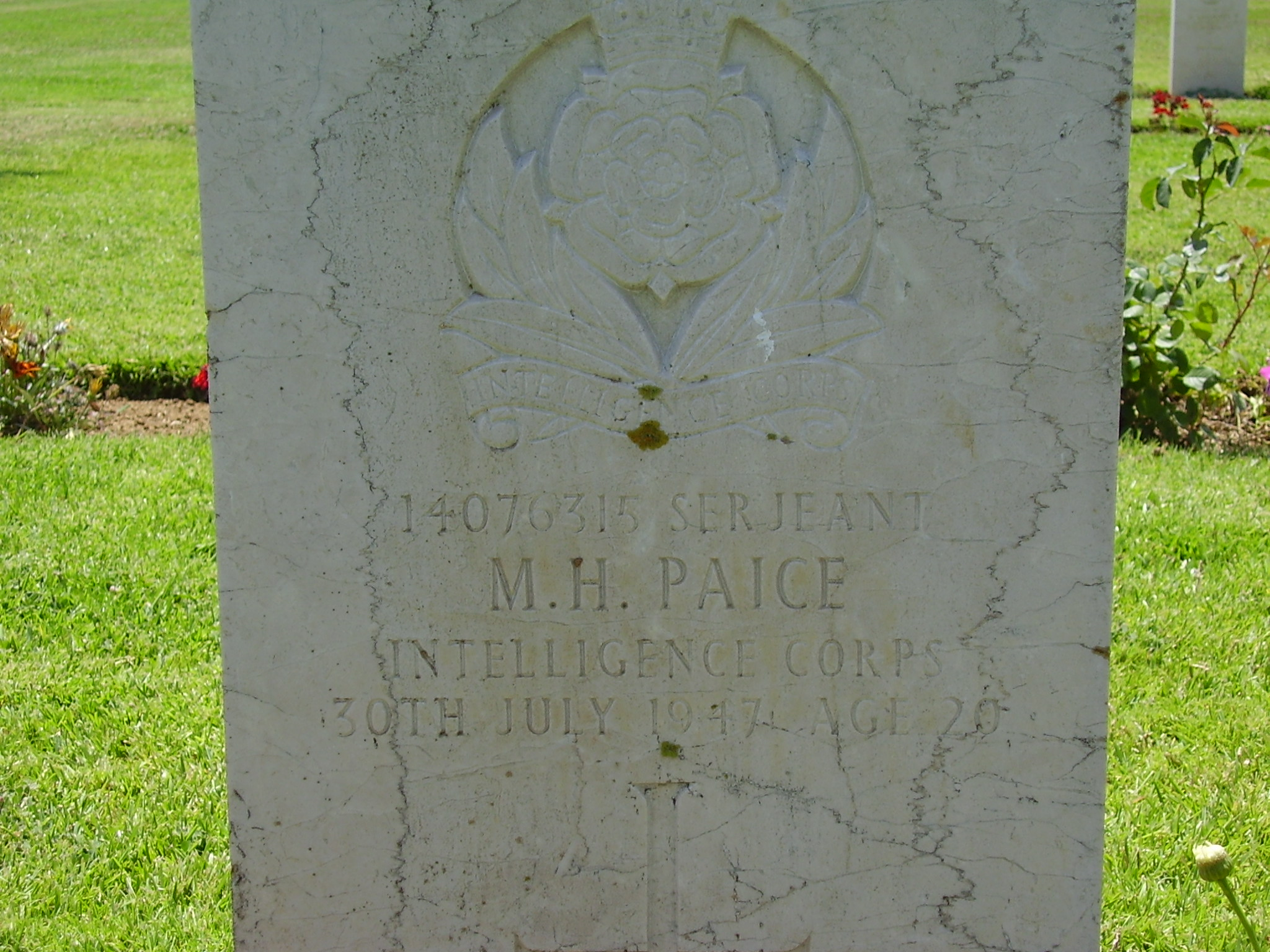
Headstone of Sergeant Mervyn Paice (INT CORPS) in Ramla British Military Cemetery, Israel

On a summer bank holiday weekend, Friday, 1 August 1947, anti-Jewish violence and rioting began. The tabloid press reported the "Irgun murders" in graphic detail. The Daily Express carried a large picture on the front page, showing the victims as they were found with hands tied behind their backs, shirts wrapped around their heads and hung from eucalyptus trees under the headline: "Hanged Britons: picture that will shock the world". The violence began in Liverpool and subsequently spread across Britain's urban centres from London to Glasgow.

Synagogues and easily recognisable Jewish properties and symbols throughout Britain were targeted by attackers. In Hendon, London, windows of the Raleigh Close synagogue were smashed and a piece of paper was found with the words "Jews are sin". Blackpool and St John's Wood synagogues received telephone calls threatening that they would be blown up, and the walls of Plymouth Synagogue were attacked and marked with anti-semitic signs and slogans: "Hang all Jews" and "Destroy Judah". In other attacks on Jewish targets, gravestones in a Jewish cemetery were uprooted in Birmingham, "Hitler was right" was daubed on properties in North Wales, and Jewish property in Halifax, Pendleton, Lancashire, Bolton, Holyhead and Southend were also attacked. In Glasgow, Scotland, bricks were thrown through the windows of Jewish shops. In Plymouth, synagogues were attacked and a dummy mine was placed at the entrance of a Jewish-owned tailor shop. In Birmingham, a half-block long and three foot high sign was painted into a wall declaring: "Gentiles Arise. Resist Jewish enterprise. Remember Paice and Martin." The back door of the JC representative's home in Cardiff was marked "Jews—good old Hitler". On 5 August 1947, The Times and Jewish Chronicle reported that in Eccles near Manchester, a crowd of 700 people "cheered each hit" as missiles pelted Jewish properties smashing their windows.

==== Liverpool ====
The most intensive and longest-lasting rioting took place in Liverpool. For over five days the city saw violence and looting, and the Lord Mayor issued an appeal to the city "to assist the police in the prevention of attacks on property and shops supposedly owned by Jews". Incidents included a synagogue being burnt down in West Derby and attacks in Liverpool City Centre in which "over a hundred windows belonging to Jewish owners were shattered". In total over 300 Jewish properties were affected by the rioting in Liverpool, and the police made 88 arrests. As he sentenced a rioter, Jack Piggott, to six months in prison for leading a mob and smashing the window of a Jewish-owned shop, one judge warned that there was "no excuse for these anti-Jewish demonstrations—they are both un-British and unpatriotic."

=== Denunciations of antisemitic violence ===
Denunciation of the rioting was expressed from within and without Anglo-Jewry. In a clear indicator of the severity of the disturbances, Home Secretary James Chuter Ede gave a written statement to Parliament regarding the matter.

The Manchester Guardian (the former name of The Guardian before it moved its head office to London) called the violence "a disgrace".

The Jewish Chronicle, which since Shaftesley's appointment as editor had assiduously followed a restrained and sensitive editorial line regarding Anglo-Jewry's position in society, was provoked by the rioting to explicitly express its anger and disillusionment with Anglo-Jewry's treatment by its compatriots.

The Association of Jewish Ex-Servicemen placed a wreath at the plinth of the Cenotaph with the inscription: "In memory of Sergeant Martin and Sergeant Paice, who died doing their duty in Palestine. From the Jewish ex-Service comrades of the British forces."

== Aftermath ==
The UNSCOP committee, which operated in Palestine at that time, could not have ignored the act. However, it was soon overshadowed by a new crisis over the Exodus, a Haganah-operated ship laden with 4,500 Jewish displaced persons, which set sail from France and was refused entry to Palestine, instead being sent back to Port-de-Bouc.

The hanging of the British sergeants has been described as a major factor in the British decision to evacuate Palestine. J. Bowyer Bell referred to the affair as the "straw that broke the Mandate's back", and wrote that it was a major factor that resulted in a consensus to evacuate Palestine. In 1961, Arthur Creech Jones, who had been British Colonial Secretary in 1947, wrote that the "deadly blow against British patience and pride" caused by the hangings was one of four major factors that had pushed the British cabinet to the decision to evacuate Palestine in September 1947, the other three being the inflexible and irreconcilable political demands of the Arabs and Jews, the unrelenting pressure that stationing a large garrison in Palestine to deal with the Jewish insurgency as well as threats of greater Zionist resistance and an Arab uprising put on an already strained British economy, and the mounting criticism over the government's failure to replace the White Paper of 1939 with a new policy. Colonel Archer Cust, who had been Chief Assistant to the Chief Secretary of Palestine, said that "The hanging of the two British sergeants did more than anything to get us out" in a 1949 lecture to the Royal Empire Society. Colonel William Nicol Gray, who had been Inspector-General of the Palestine Police Force at the time, later told an Israeli journalist that he believed the event, together with the Night of the Beatings and the Acre Prison break, sufficiently shook the government to consider leaving Palestine. Gray stated that "An empire can permit itself to be unjust, even tyrannical and terrifying. It can permit itself defeats on the battlefield or in the diplomatic arena but it cannot allow itself one thing: to lose prestige and become a laughingstock. When the underground killed our men, we could treat it as murder but when they erected gallows and executed our men, it was as if they were saying 'we rule here as much as you do', and that no administration can bear. Our choice was obvious. Either total suppression or get out, and we chose the second."

Menachem Begin claimed in his book The Revolt that the "cruel act" was one of the events which tipped the balance in the British withdrawal from Palestine. During the last interview of his life in 1991, Begin said that the decision to hang the sergeants was the most difficult decision he made as Irgun commander, but said that "after the brutal act there were no more hangings of Jews in Palestine." Former Irgun high command member Shmuel Katz later said that "The British understood that after the Olei Hagardom went to the noose with their heads held high and after the sergeants were hanged, there was no more scope for escalation. The game was over."

In a November 1948 letter regarding an entrance visa to the United States for Menachem Begin, Robert A. Lovett wrote that it might spark a conflict with Britain, due to Begin's association with Irgun acts including the hangings of Paice and Martin.

Elie Wiesel depicted a fictionalised version of the event in his 1961 novel Dawn, which was adapted into a film in 1985. Bernice Rubens' novel The Sergeants' Tale is based on the event as well. The British television series The Promise also features a fictionalised account of the event.

A memorial grove to the sergeants was established in Netanya and still exists.

On June 28 1948, as the British Army was leaving Haifa, the last 12 Jewish prisoners held by the authorities were released. These included five youths suspected of being involved in the hanging.

== See also ==
- List of kidnappings
- Corporals killings
