= Meir Nakar =

Iraqi Jewish paramilitary member (1926–1947)

- Native name: מאיר נקר
- Born: July 26, 1926; Jerusalem, Mandatory Palestine
- Died: July 29, 1947 (aged 21) Acre Prison, Acre, Mandatory Palestine
- Cause of death: Execution by hanging
- Buried: Safed, Israel
- Allegiance: Irgun
- Conflicts: World War II; Jewish insurgency in Mandatory Palestine: Acre Prison break (executed)

Meir Nakar (Hebrew: מאיר נקר; July 26, 1926 – July 29, 1947) was a member of the Irgun in pre-state Mandatory Palestine and one of 12 Olei Hagardom.

== Early life and army service ==
Meir Nakar was born in Jerusalem to a poor Orthodox-Jewish family of Iraqi-Jewish origin, one of five brothers and a sister. His father was a shoemaker. At age 12, he left school and began working to support his family, and a year later, he joined the Betar Zionist youth movement.

At age 15, he tried to enlist in the British Army to fight in World War II, but was rejected. When he was 17, he tried again and succeeded, using a forged birth certificate. He served in Egypt, Cyprus, and Southern Europe, initially as a quartermaster and then as a motorcycle dispatch rider. The antisemitism he encountered during his military service solidified his Zionist views. After being discharged in 1946, he returned home and joined his father in the shoemaking business. At the same time, he joined the Irgun underground movement, and received the nickname "Yehiam".

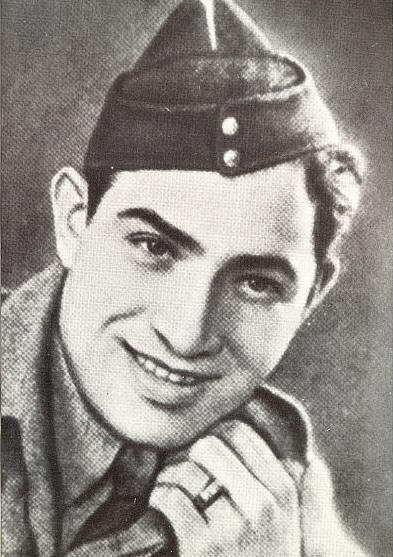
Nakar in his British Army uniform

== The underground ==
For the first five months of his Irgun service, Nakar was active in recruitment and propaganda, but then moved into the Irgun's Combat Corps. He participated in the Irgun attack on the Goldschmidt Officer's Club in Jerusalem, which killed 17 people.

On May 4, 1947, he participated in the Acre Prison break, an Irgun raid against Acre Prison to free imprisoned Jewish underground members. Nakar was a member of one of the blocking squad that laid mines on nearby roads to delay British forces pursuing the attackers and escapees as they retreated. The mining operation was successful, but during the retreat, Dov Salomon, one of the commanders of the operation who was responsible for calling away the blocking squads, forgot about his squad. As a result, his squad was left behind, and was still waiting at its post when the British arrived and arrested them. Others from the blocking squads taken prisoner were Avshalom Haviv, Yaakov Weiss, Amnon Michaelov, and Nachman Zitterbaum.

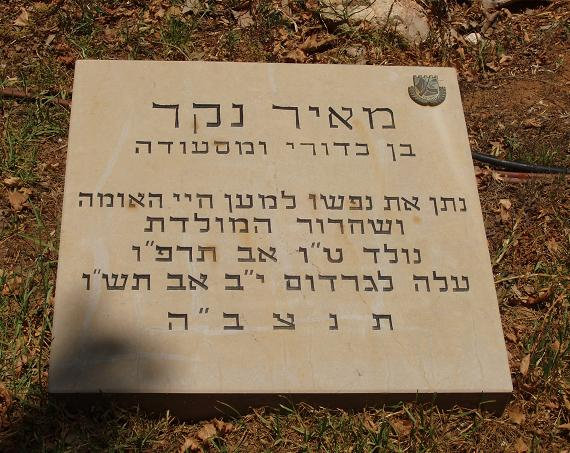
Monument for Meir Nakar

== Trial and execution ==
The trial of the five captured Irgun fighters before a British military court in Jerusalem began on May 28, 1947. The defendants mostly refused to take part in the proceedings, denied the court's authority to try them, and when given the opportunity to defend themselves, gave defiant anti-British speeches. On June 16, the five were found guilty of discharging a firearm and possessing explosives. Nakar, Weiss, and Haviv were sentenced to death, while Michaelov and Zitterbaum, who were underage, received life sentences.

Subsequently, Nakar, Weiss, and Haviv were transferred to a condemned cell in Acre Prison, where they spent their time writing letters and studying the Book of Psalms. On July 8, the commander of British forces in Palestine confirmed the death sentences. On July 12, the Irgun abducted two British sergeants, Clifford Martin and Mervyn Paice, in Netanya, and threatened to hang them if the death sentences were carried out.

Despite the threat to the sergeants' lives, British High Commissioner Alan Cunningham ordered the executions to go ahead. In the early morning hours of July 29, 1947, Haviv, Weiss, and Nakar were hanged in Acre Prison. Each man sang Hatikvah on his way to the gallows, joined by the other Jewish prisoners.

== Aftermath ==
The day after the execution, the three men were buried in Safed.

Following the hangings, the Irgun carried out its threat and hanged the two sergeants in retaliation. Their bodies were found hanging from trees in a eucalyptus grove near Netanya, and were booby-trapped with a mine, which injured a British officer as he cut one of them down. The act deeply shocked and angered the British public, and is seen as a major catalyst in the British decision to withdraw from Palestine later that year.

Today, Nakar and the other Olei Hagardom are revered by Israel as national heroes, and streets have been named in his honor in Tel Aviv, Jerusalem, and Beersheba.
