= Yaakov Weiss =

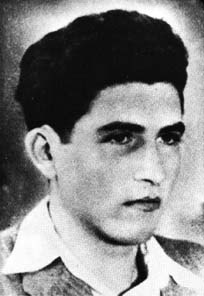
- Native name: יעקב וייס
- Born: 15 July 1924; Nové Zámky, Czechoslovakia
- Died: 29 July 1947 (aged 23) Acre Prison, Acre, Mandatory Palestine
- Cause of death: Execution by hanging
- Buried: Tzfat, Israel
- Allegiance: Irgun
- Conflicts: World War II; Jewish insurgency in Mandatory Palestine: Acre Prison break (executed)

Yaakov Weiss (Hebrew: יעקב וייס; 15 July 1924 – 29 July 1947) was a Hungarian Jew born in Czechoslovakia and member of the Irgun, a Jewish guerrilla organization in Mandatory Palestine. After saving hundreds of Jews during Holocaust, in which his own mother died, he illegally immigrated to Palestine, joined the Irgun, and fought the British during the Jewish insurgency in Palestine. He was one of three Irgun members executed for their part in the Acre Prison break, which triggered the Irgun's retaliatory hanging of two British soldiers.

Weiss, the last Zionist insurgent to be executed by British authorities in Mandatory Palestine, is memorialized today as one of 12 Olei Hagardom.

== Early life ==
Yaakov (Imre) Weiss was born in 1924 in Nové Zámky, Czechoslovakia, to a Hungarian-speaking Jewish family, the son of Joseph and Helena Weiss. He had one sister, Edith. At age 10 he was sent to the Hebrew Gymnasium in Munkács. He developed Revisionist Zionist views and joined the Betar youth movement.

== Activities during the Holocaust ==
In 1943, following his father's death and with World War II underway, Weiss fled to Budapest, hoping to get to Palestine from there. While in Budapest, he frequently disguised himself as a Hungarian military officer or an SS officer, stole birth certificates and passports, and used the fraudulent documents to save hundreds of Jews. He would frequently travel to ghettos, especially those in Miskolc, Debrecen, Košice, and Eger, and demand the Nazi authorities release individual Jews he picked out, producing forged documents "proving" they were Christians. However, he did not manage to produce documents for his mother and sister in time to prevent their deportation to Auschwitz, where his mother was murdered but his sister survived.

== Emigration to Palestine and Irgun activities ==
In summer 1944, Weiss managed to escape to Switzerland, and studied at the University of Geneva. In 1945, he boarded an Aliyah Bet ship headed for Palestine. It was intercepted by the Royal Navy, and Weiss was interned at Atlit detainee camp. On 9 October 1945 the Palmach raided the camp and freed 208 inmates, Weiss among them. One of his rescuers was Avshalom Haviv, who would eventually be hanged alongside him.

Weiss moved to Netanya, where he worked as a menial laborer and jewelry retoucher. He joined the Irgun, which was then conducting an insurrection against the British authorities in Palestine with the goal of compelling them to leave so a Jewish state could be established. He was assigned to the Combat Corps and adopted the nom de guerre "Shimon". He took part in two raids on the British military resort camp near Netanya, mining operations against British security traffic, the bombing of a road bridge, and in railway sabotage.

On 4 May 1947 he took part in the Acre Prison break, an attack against Acre Prison, a British fortress prison in the city of Acre, during which 28 Jewish underground prisoners were freed. Weiss was part of a blocking squad that laid mines to cover the retreat of the attackers and escapees by delaying any British pursuers. However, Weiss was captured, along with Avshalom Haviv, Meir Nakar, Amnon Michaelov, and Nahman Zitterbaum.

== Trial and execution ==
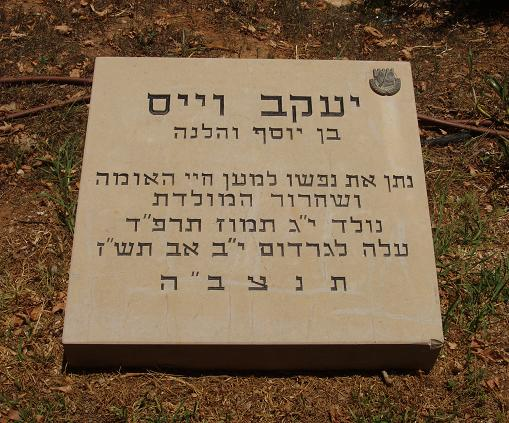
Memorial plaque to Yaakov Weiss

The five men were tried on capital charges of discharging a firearm and illegally possessing explosives in a military court, though Michaelov and Zitterbaum were too young to be sentenced to death. During their trial, the men refused to participate, disrupted the proceedings, and spent their time joking among themselves and drawing caricatures of members of the court. When given the opportunity to speak in their own defense, each of them gave defiant anti-British speeches. During his speech, Weiss stated:

"We hold your threats of murder in contempt. We know the outcome of this fight and that is why we are calm, even happy - knowing we are among those who are directly bringing about the fulfillment of attaining our people's freedom."

When the three men were sentenced to death, they broke into song, singing Hatikvah. They were taken to Acre Prison. While they were awaiting execution, the Irgun abducted British sergeants Clifford Martin and Mervyn Paice in Netanya and threatened to hang them if Haviv, Weiss, and Nakar were executed. However, the threats were ignored, and General Alan Cunningham, the High Commissioner for Palestine, ordered that the executions be carried out.

Haviv, Weiss, and Nakar were hanged in Acre Prison early on the morning of 29 July 1947, with Weiss being the last one executed. Each of them went to their deaths singing Hatikvah, with the rest of the Jewish prisoners joining in. The next day, they were buried in Safed.

== Aftermath ==
The Irgun subsequently carried out its threat to hang Sergeants Martin and Paice; the two men were killed and their bodies were hanged from trees and booby-trapped with a mine that injured an officer trying to cut one of them down. This incident shocked and enraged the British authorities and public, and led to violent reprisals by British troops that killed five Jews in Tel Aviv and several days of antisemitic rioting in British cities. However, it also led to the suspension of the death penalty in Palestine, and has been cited as a major catalyst for the eventual British withdrawal from Palestine.

Yaakov Weiss is remembered in Israel as one of the 12 Olei Hagardom, Palestinian Jewish fighters who were hanged or committed suicide while awaiting execution during the Mandate era. As with the other Olei Hagardom, streets have been named after him throughout Israel.
