= Acre Prison break =

Prison break in Palestine in 1947

Coordinates: 32.9237°N 35.0694°E

- Part of Jewish insurgency in Mandatory Palestine
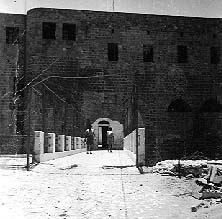
- Acre Prison
- Location: Mandatory Palestine
- Planned by: Irgun
- Commanded by: Dov Cohen †
- Target: Acre Prison
- Objective: Free Irgun and Lehi members from Acre Prison
- Date: May 4, 1947; 79 years ago
- Executed by: Irgun
- Outcome: 27 Irgun and Lehi members escaped; 214 Arab prisoners escaped
- Casualties: Nine Irgun members killed, five Irgun members captured (three later executed)

The Acre Prison break was an operation undertaken by the Irgun on May 4, 1947, in the British Mandate of Palestine, in which its men broke through the walls of the Central Prison in Acre and freed 27 incarcerated Irgun and Lehi members.

== History ==
At the time of the British Mandate the citadel in the old city of Acre was used as a prison. In total, the prison contained 700 Arab prisoners and 90 Jewish prisoners, the latter mainly members of the Jewish underground groups Haganah, Lehi, and Irgun, who had been captured by the British. One of those prisoners was Eitan Livni (father of Tzipi Livni), the Irgun operations officer.

On April 16, 1947, four Irgun members, Dov Gruner, Yehiel Dresner, Mordechai Alkahi, and Eliezer Kashani, who had been captured by the British 6th Airborne Division, were hanged in Acre Prison to become the Irgun's first postwar 'martyrs'. At his trial, Dov Gruner declared the British Army and Administration to be 'criminal organizations'.

The Lehi and Irgun prisoners considered an escape but concluded that would be impossible without outside assistance. They therefore contacted Irgun headquarters with a plan. Dov Cohen, AKA "Shimshon", a former member of the British Army who had served in No. 51 Commando and the Special Interrogation Group during World War II, was selected to lead the operation. The plan was facilitated by Peres Etkes, an American of Russian Jewish origins, who worked for the Mandatory authorities as an engineer and who had built the prison. According to his nephew, Etkes furnished the Irgun with a detailed map of the prison.

== Operation ==
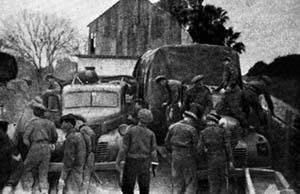
Irgun men disguised as British soldiers.

The break-out was originally planned for April, but was eventually rescheduled for Sunday, May 4, 1947, at 4 p.m., the day the United Nations General Assembly convened to discuss the Palestine issue. The Irgun High Command selected 41 prisoners for escape: 30 Irgun and 11 Lehi, as that was the available number of spots available at safe houses. The Irgun High Command, and Eitan Livni, an imprisoned Irgun member, extensively planned the break and escape route. The logistic preparations were complicated: The Irgun purchased a truck, a jeep, two military pickup trucks and civilian vehicles, which were then disguised as British. British Army uniforms were also acquired. A stock of civilian clothing was also arranged to help the escapees blend in with the general population. Irgun reconnaissance efforts had discovered a weak spot in the citadel: the southern wall right above a hammam (Turkish bathhouse). The Irgun had therefore smuggled TNT into the prison, which was then used to improvise 30 hand grenades and two bombs.

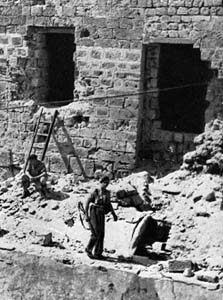
The prison wall after the break.

On Sunday, May 4, 1947, the Irgun fighters arrived at Acre in a convoy consisting of a military truck, two military vans painted in British camouflage colors, two civilian vans, and a command jeep in the lead. Twenty fighters were dressed in Royal Engineers uniforms, and three as Arabs. The commander of the assault team, Dov Cohen, rode in the command jeep and was dressed as a decorated Royal Engineers captain. The truck pulled up to the prison's gate, while the two vans pulled into a nearby market. At 14:00 a military engineering unit of the Irgun, under the command of Dov Salomon and Yehuda Afiryon, went into action. Ladders were removed from one of the vehicles, and the men made their way to the nearby Turkish bath, disguised as Royal Engineers telephone technicians and carrying TNT, ropes and other necessary incursion equipment. They set the charges and climbed back down onto the street.

While the Irgun units were moving into position, the prisoners were putting the plan into effect inside. At 15:00, the doors of the cells were opened for afternoon exercise. The prisoners who were not scheduled to escape went down to the courtyard to create a diversion, while the designated escapees remained in their cells. At the same time, Irgun blocking squads mined nearby roads to delay any British pursuers, and a diversion party disguised as Arabs moved into position in the vicinity of a British Army camp with a mortar.

At 16:22, the charges detonated, blowing a massive hole in one of the prison's walls. Upon hearing the blast, the diversion party fired mortar shells at the British Army camp, then withdrew. Meanwhile, in the prison, the first group of escapees quickly ran out of their cells towards the breach in the wall, and had to push through a crowd of Arab prisoners that had run out of their cells in panic. Using the smuggled explosive charges, they blew up two iron gates that obstructed their way to the kerosene room, where the hole in the prison wall was. The second group of escapees put up a barricade of flammable materials and set it alight to create a fire which blocked the escape route, preventing the guards from immediately reaching it. The resulting smokescreen and fire only added to the chaos that the explosions had caused. The Arab prisoners in the prison yard began shouting and running wildly, with some running directly into the barbed-wire fences, and others rushing to or breaking out of their cells in fear of the fire and explosions.

The Arab guards, assuming a prison break was underway, began shooting into the crowd. Amidst this chaos, a third group stepped into the prison yard and tossed grenades at guards positioned on the roof, causing them to flee. The explosions caused further panic and chaos among the other prisoners. Amidst the chaos, the two groups escaped through the hole in the wall. Uncertain as to what was happening, the guards did not enter the yard. Meanwhile, Arab prisoners running through the yard and corridors began to discover the hole in the wall. Over the following hour, 214 of the 394 Arab prisoners in Acre Prison escaped through the hole in the wall and disappeared into the city.

The first group of escapees and some of the strike force boarded the first truck, which sped off and managed to exit Acre, but immediately south of the city they were ambushed by British soldiers who had been bathing at a nearby beach and were alerted by sounds of the commotion at Acre Prison. They opened fire on the truck. The driver, attempting to dodge the fire, drove the truck into a cactus clump, causing it to collapse on its left side. The men tumbled out and were immediately fired on by the British as they tried to escape. Dov Cohen and two other Irgun fighters, Nissim Levy and Zalman Lifshitz, was waiting by their jeep at a nearby command post. When the British opened fire, Cohen at first attempted to intervene and guide the other prisoners to safety. His uniform initially prevented the British from shooting at him, but in the end he, along with Levy and Lifshitz, were shot while providing covering fire for the escapees. A total of nine escapees and attackers died. Some had been taken alive but wounded, and died in jail after being refused medical treatment. Only one of the escapees from the first truck, Nissim Benado, managed to evade capture; but he was seriously wounded and died later in a Haifa hideout. The survivors were swiftly recaptured and returned to prison.

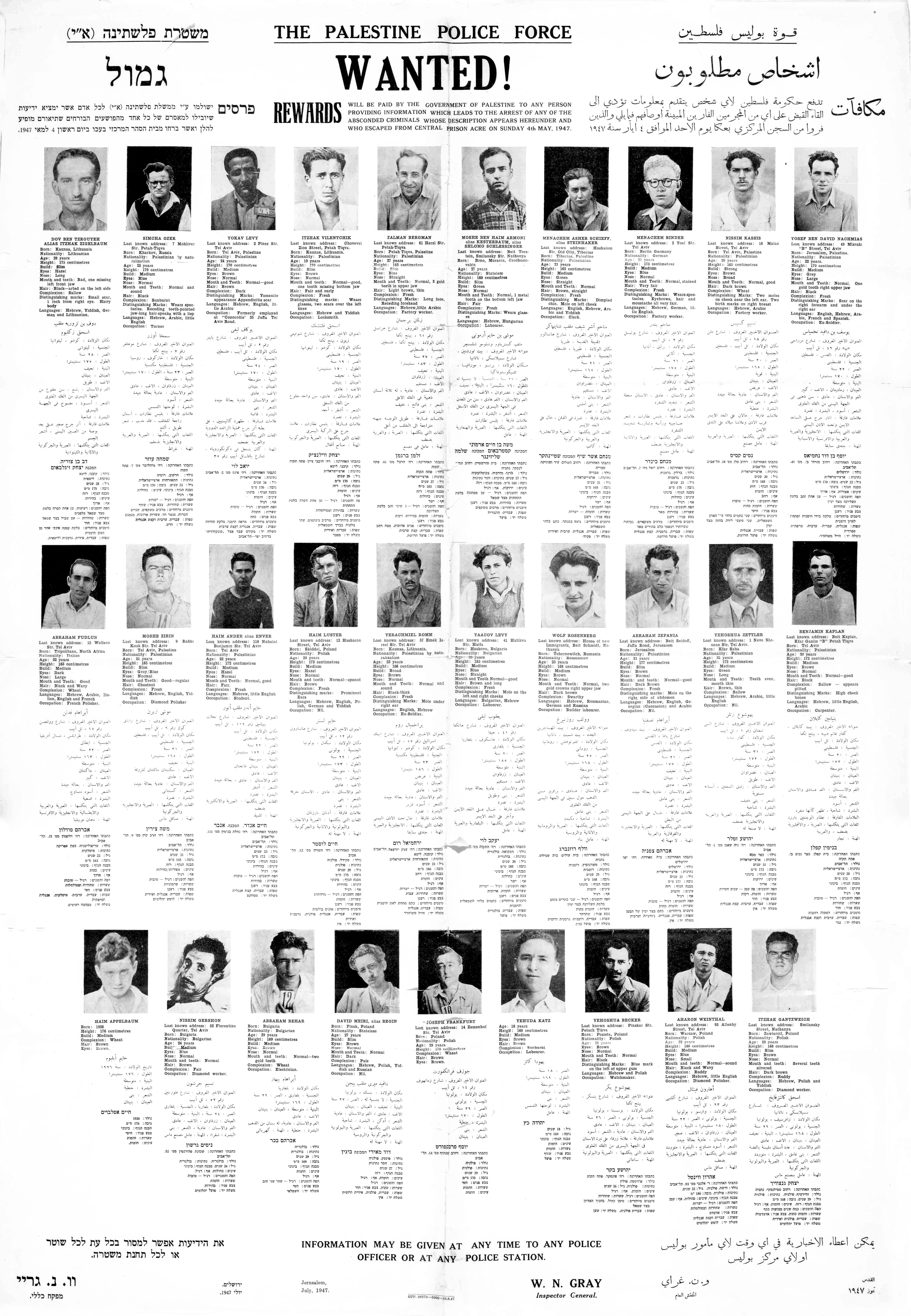
Wanted poster for Jews who escaped

The remaining escapees and members of the strike force quickly boarded the second and third trucks, and Salomon began calling the blocking squads away. Although they withdrew in good order, he forgot to call away one squad commanded by Avshalom Haviv. Meanwhile, one of the trucks experienced engine problems and would not start. As a result, the occupants had to push it while the driver tried to start the engine, and the truck was surrounded by an Arab mob, which began pelting it with objects. When the driver managed to start up the engine again, the pushers quickly climbed aboard and a sound grenade was tossed into the Arabs blocking its path, causing the crowd to disperse. The two trucks then linked up and drove away from Acre. As they passed Haviv's blocking squad, the men called to him that the operation was over, but Haviv, who felt he had to wait for a formal order from Salomon, chose to remain in place. As the trucks drove off a burst of fire hit one of them, killing one of the escapees inside. The mines planted by the blocking squads were successful in holding the British back, and five British soldiers were wounded by one mine. When the British arrived at Haviv's blocking position, the squad was captured.

After the two trucks had escaped Acre, a British truck began following them shortly after they turned away from the sea road. The guard sitting in the passenger seat began firing at them with his pistol. A sound grenade was then tossed in the British truck's path. The resulting noise and burst of smoke caused the driver to brake sharply, allowing the convoy to lose the pursuing truck. The trucks reached kibbutz Dalia, where the fighters and escapees abandoned their vehicles and weapons. The head of the escapees, Eitan Livni, met with two Haganah men in the kibbutz and insisted they not contact the authorities until nine. They then walked to the town of Binyamina, and hid there for the rest of the day. The following morning, they were dispersed throughout Palestine to pre-designated hiding places. Overall, 27 Irgun and Lehi prisoners escaped, along with 214 Arab prisoners. Seven of the fighters who were killed during the operation are buried in the nearby cemetery of Shavei Tzion.

== Aftermath ==
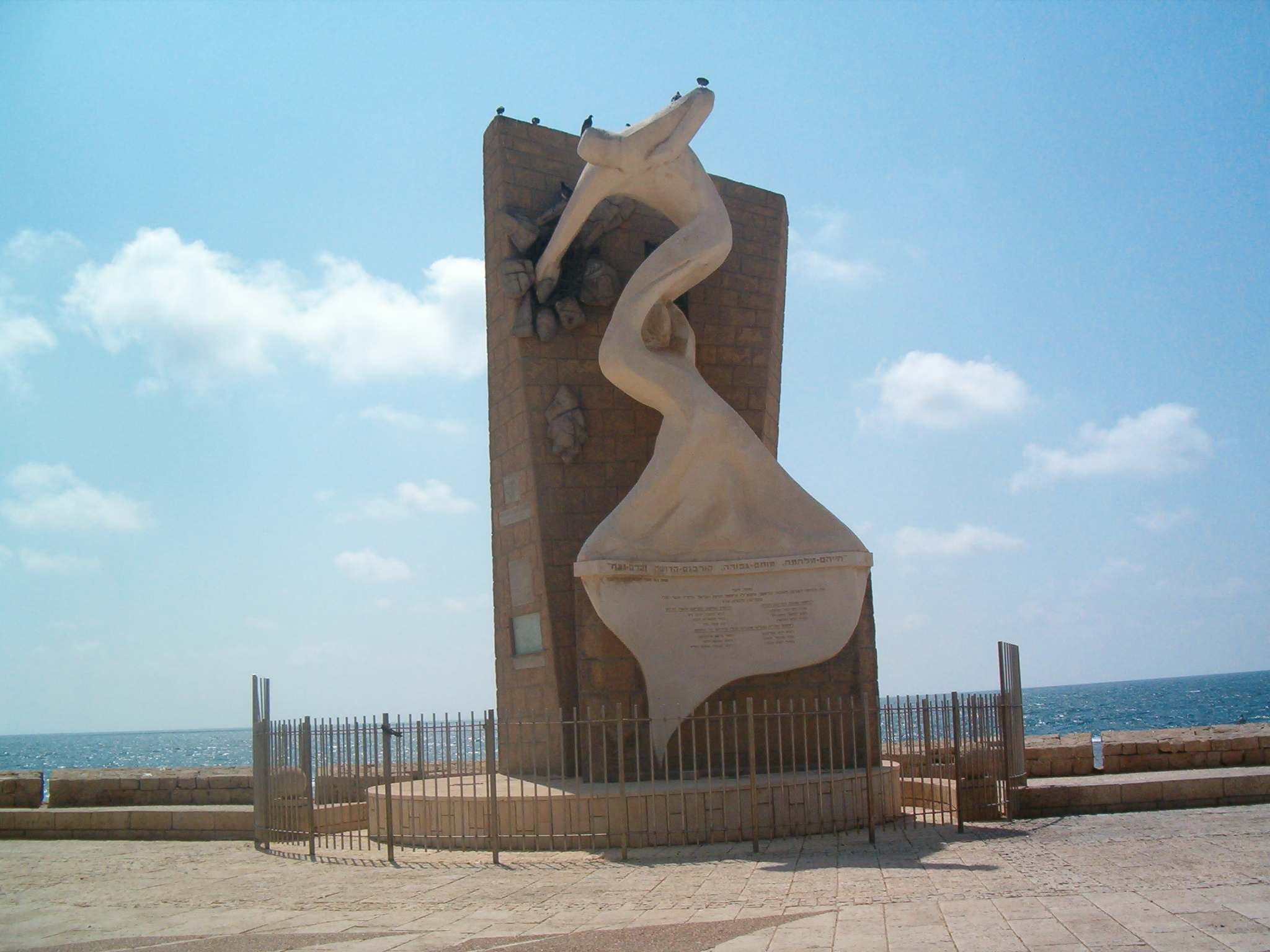
A monument along the Acre promenade commemorating the break.

The New York Herald Tribune wrote that the underground had carried out "an ambitious mission, their most challenging so far, in perfect fashion", while in the House of Commons, Oliver Stanley asked what action His Majesty's Government was planning to take "in light of the events at Acre prison which had reduced British prestige to a nadir."

The Jewish Agency called the break "an irresponsible suicidal act", while Irgun commander Menachem Begin hailed it as an act of heroism.

The five men from the blocking squads who had been captured, Avshalom Haviv, Meir Nakar, Yaakov Weiss, Amnon Michaelov, and Nahman Zitterbaum (Menachem Ostrowitz's underground name), were tried in a British military court. Haviv, Weiss, and Nakar were sentenced to death. Michaelov and Zitterbaum received life sentences since they were minors. In response to the death sentences, the Irgun abducted two British sergeants, Clifford Martin and Mervyn Paice, and threatened to kill them should the British carry out the death sentences. When the British authorities did not relent and hanged the three, the Irgun killed the two sergeants and hanged their bodies from a tree in a eucalyptus grove near Netanya. This action is credited with being one of the major catalysts for the eventual British withdrawal from Palestine.

The Acre Prison break, with other operations had a strong effect on the morale of the Yishuv and on the fight for the foundation of Israel. It is considered to have seriously damaged British prestige and sped up to the foundation of the UNSCOP committee.

The operation is marked by a monument on the Acre promenade.
