= Eitan Livni =

Israeli politician

- איתן לבני
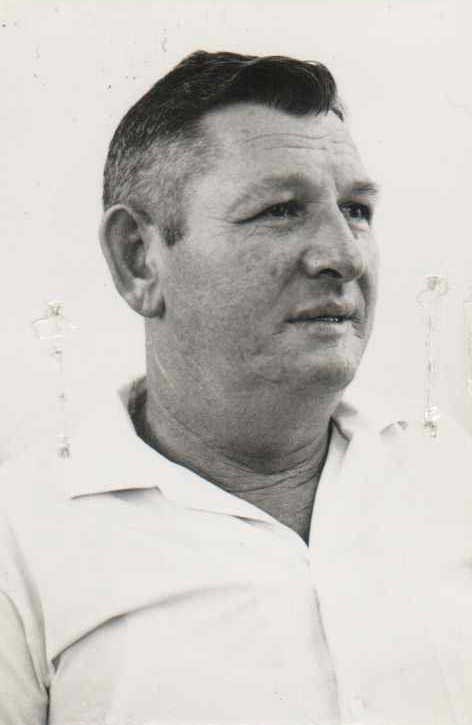

Faction represented in the Knesset
- 1974–1984: Likud

Personal details
- Born: 1 April 1919 Grodno, Ober Ost (now in Belarus)
- Died: 27 December 1991 (aged 72)
- Spouse: Sara Rosenberg
- Children: Tzipi Livni

Yeruham "Eitan" Livni (Hebrew: ירוחם "איתן" לבני; 1 April 1919 – 27 December 1991) was a Revisionist Zionist activist, Irgun commander and Israeli politician, father of Israeli politician Tzipi Livni.

== Life and career ==
Livni was born in Grodno, Poland (now in Belarus) on 1 April 1919 to Yitzhak and Dvora. His family moved to Mandatory Palestine in 1925 and settled in Tel Aviv. He went to High School and Trade School in Tel Aviv, and in 1938, he joined the Betar movement at Zikhron Ya'akov, where he was assigned to agricultural work and guard duty. Soon after, he joined the Irgun, and a year later, he was summoned to a commanders course at Tel Tzur (near Binyamina).

When the Irgun proclaimed the Jewish insurgency in Mandatory Palestine in February 1944, he was put in charge of the Irgun activities, and was later appointed to the General Headquarters as chief operations officer. He was arrested on April 4, 1946, for his participation in the sabotage operation against British railroads called "Night of the Trains", where an Irgun fighter, two British and four Arabs were killed, which was along with the Night of the Airfields and the Night of the Bridges led a forceful British retaliation, and 2 weeks later Operation Agatha. He was sentenced, together with his comrades, to 15 years imprisonment, but was freed two years later in the Acre Prison break. He was sent clandestinely to Europe to organize action against British targets there, and on May 15, 1948, he returned home to take part in the 1948 Arab–Israeli War.

After Israel was established in 1948, he and Sara Rosenberg, a fellow Irgun activist, became the first couple to marry in the new Jewish state. He was chairman of the Wood Products Department of the Industrialists Association from 1949 to 1959, and owner of the “Ariah” Starch Factory until 1965. He was a member of the Directorate and Secretariat of the Herut Movement in 1960 and Head of its Organization Department in 1965. He was also the chairman of the Union of Irgun Soldiers between 1962 and 1980 and chairman of Acre and Jerusalem Prisoners Association in 1963.

In 1968, he became a member of the Directorate of Gahal and later of Likud, and was the chairman of the Directorate of Likud from 1970 to 1971. He was elected to the Knesset in 1973, 1977 and 1981. He was a member of the Economic Affairs, Foreign Affairs and Defense and State Control Committees. He was politically moderate.

Before his death, he was placed in the honorary 114th spot on the Likud list on 1988 Israeli legislative election. He died in 1991. At his specific request, the Irgun emblem was engraved on his headstone. After his death, his daughter, Tzipi, entered the Israeli political scene, and has become a prominent minister for Likud and Kadima. She was later elected leader of Kadima, but eventually left to form her own party, Hatnuah.

== Bibliography ==
- Personal Story of Operations Officer of Etzel (1983) (in Hebrew)
