= Suicide mission =

Task that will likely involve the death of the participants

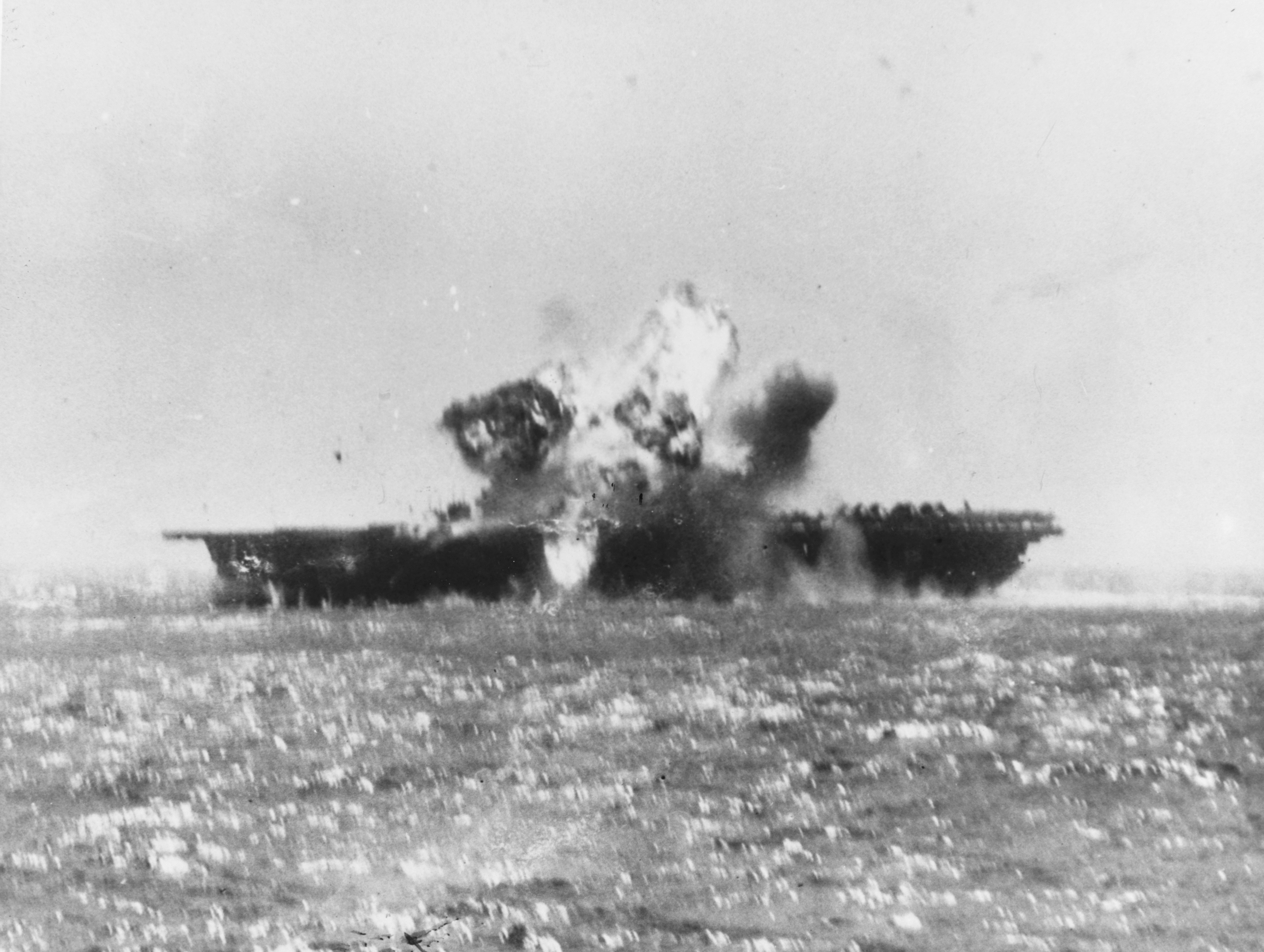
Suicide attack on the USS Essex (CV-9) by a Kamikaze pilot, near the Philippines.

A suicide mission is a task and/or mission which is extremely dangerous or dangerous to the point where the people involved are not expected to survive, often rendering the persons as "expendable" for the mission. The term is sometimes extended to include suicide attacks, such as kamikaze pilots and other suicide bombings, whose perpetrators kill themselves and their opponents or destroy other enemy targets.

== Military and wartime ==
In a military context, soldiers can be ordered to perform very dangerous tasks or can undertake them on their initiative. For example, in the First World War, French soldiers mutinied en masse in 1917, after appalling losses convinced them that their participation at the front would inevitably lead to their deaths, and in October 2004, during the Iraq War, 19 soldiers in the US Army refused orders to drive unarmored fuel trucks near Baghdad, calling the task a "suicide mission". Those soldiers faced investigations for breakdown of discipline.

Suicide missions can also be an act of desperation, such as a last stand, or to save lives. The latter end of the Battle of Stalingrad could be seen as a suicide mission from the German perspective, as they were ordered to fight to the death with no option of surrendering nor the chance of escape.

=== Special forces ===
Special forces units are often sent on missions that are exceedingly dangerous with the hope that their superior training and abilities will allow them to complete them successfully and survive. An example is an attempt by two U.S. Delta Force snipers to protect a downed helicopter pilot (Michael Durant) from being killed or captured by militia during the Battle of Mogadishu in 1993. While the sniper team held off advancing militia forces long enough for the pilot to survive, both snipers were killed, and the pilot was eventually captured but then later released. However, even special forces groups refuse to participate in some missions. Operation Mikado, a plan for a Special Air Service raid on Río Grande, Tierra del Fuego, during the 1982 Falklands War, was ultimately not executed due in part to significant hostility from members of the SAS, who saw the mission as exceedingly risky.

=== Strafbataillon ===
The men of the Strafbataillon's probationary unit Bewährungsbataillon (Probation Battalion) and Strafdivision 500 (Penal Division 500) had to prove themselves through "exceptional bravery" on dangerous front-line missions. Otherwise, they faced the execution of the imposed sentence, transfer to the Emsland camps, or punishment units.

== Attacks against stronger opponents ==
=== Sicarii (first century AD) ===
The Sicarii Jewish sect are sometimes described as carrying out "suicidal" attacks against their enemies. Riaz Hassan said that the first-century AD Jewish Sicarii sect carried out "suicidal missions to kill" Hellenized Jews they considered immoral collaborators. An article in BBC Arabic claimed the Sicarii were the first group to carry out suicide attacks. In September 2023 the BBC responded to a complaint, deleted the Sicarii and reworded the second example so that the revised article called the Order of Assassins (Ismaeli Shia) the first. However, both groups were killed by their opponents, so neither fit the narrower definition of a suicide attack.

=== Order of Assassins (1090 to 1275 AD) ===
The Order of Assassins (Arabic: حَشّاشِین, romanized: Hashishiyeen, Persian: حشاشين, romanized: Ḥaššāšīn) were from a sect of Ismaili Shi'a Muslims. They assassinated two Caliphs, as well as many viziers, Sultans, and Crusade leaders over 300 years, before being annihilated by Mongol invaders. Hashishiyeen were known for targeting the powerful, using the dagger as a weapon (rather than something safer for the assassin such as a crossbow), and for not attempting to escape after completing their killing.

=== Acehnese martyrs ===
Location of Aceh on a map of present day Indonesia.

The former Dutch East Indies (dark red) within the Empire of Japan (light red) at its furthest extent.

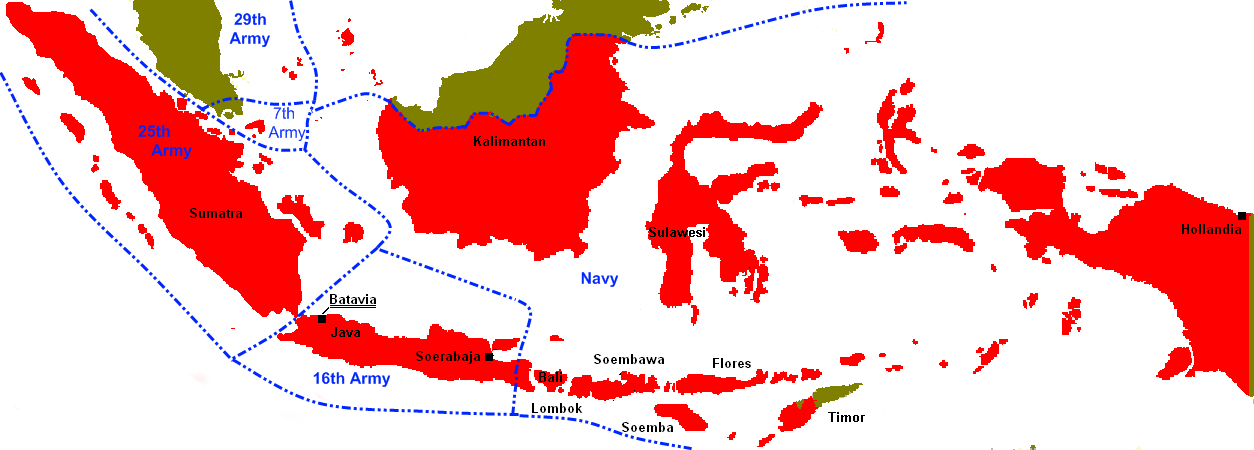
Administrative areas after April 1943, during the Japanese occupation of the Dutch East Indies.

==== Aceh war (1873–1904) ====
Muslim Acehnese from the Aceh Sultanate performed suicide attacks known as parang-sabil against Dutch invaders during the Aceh War (1873–1904). It was considered part of personal jihad in Islam. The Dutch called it Atjèh-moord, (lit. Aceh murder). The Acehnese work of literature the Hikayat Perang Sabil provided the background and reasoning for the Atjèh-moord as Acehnese suicide attacks upon the Dutch. The Indonesian translations of the Dutch terms are Aceh bodoh, Aceh pungo, Aceh gila, or Aceh mord.

==== Aceh in WWII ====
Atjèh-moord was also used against the Japanese by the Acehnese during the Japanese occupation of Aceh. The Acehnese Ulama (Islamic Scholars) fought against both the Dutch and the Japanese, revolting against the Dutch in February 1942 and against Japan in November 1942. The revolt was led by the All-Aceh Religious Scholars' Association (PUSA). The Japanese suffered 18 dead in the uprising while they slaughtered either up to 100 or over 120 Acehnese. The revolt happened in Bayu and was centred around Tjot Plieng village's religious school. During the revolt, the Japanese troops armed with mortars and machine guns were charged by sword wielding Acehnese under Teungku Abduldjalil (Tengku Abdul Djalil) in Buloh Gampong Teungah on 10 November and Tjot Plieng on 13 November. In May 1945 the Acehnese rebelled again.

=== Moro juramentado ===
Juramentado, in Philippine history, refers to a male Moro swordsman (from the Tausug tribe of Sulu) who attacked and killed targeted occupying and invading police and soldiers. Death was expected, and considered martyrdom, undertaken as a form of jihad.

Moro people who performed suicide attacks were called mag-sabil, and the suicide attacks were known as parang-sabil. The Spanish called them juramentados. The idea of the juramentado was considered part of jihad in the Moros' Islamic religion. During an attack, a juramentado would throw himself at his targets and kill them with bladed weapons such as barongs and kris until he was killed. The Moros performed juramentado suicide attacks against the Spanish in the Spanish–Moro conflict of the 16th to the 19th centuries, against the Americans in the Moro Rebellion from 1899 to 1913), and against the Japanese in World War II.

The Moro (Spanish: juramentados) launched suicide attacks on the Japanese, Spanish, Americans and Filipinos, but did not attack the non-Muslim Chinese as the Chinese were not considered enemies of the Moro people. The Japanese responded to these suicide attacks by massacring all known family members and relatives of the attackers.

According to historian Stephan Dale, the Moro were not the only culture who carried out suicide attacks "in their fight against Western hegemony and colonial rule". In the 18th century, suicide tactics were used on the Malabar Coast of southwestern India, and in Aceh in Northern Sumatra as well.

=== Auschwitz Revolt (1944) ===
The Auschwitz Sonderkommando revolt on 7 October 1944 is widely described as a suicide mission. Most of the rebel prisoners were killed by the SS guards during or soon after the uprising. Rebels armed with work tools and shivs attacked SS guards who were armed with pistols and machine guns. Some of the Sonderkommando prisoners took the already suicidal mission a step further. They set fire to Crematorium IV while they were inside the building, and stayed inside to prevent the guards putting out the fire until the building was destroyed. The fire possibly also ignited explosives they had placed in the walls. The Polish resistance outside the camp tried to postpone the uprising until the Red Army were close enough to assist, originally it was planned to coordinate with Operation Bagration, but was delayed. Some worried that people who did not participate would face collective punishment for the revolt. The Sonderkommando prisoners, who had been forced to work in the crematorium, were unwilling to wait; they worried they would be killed before the Red Army arrived. The Red Army eventually did liberate the concentration camp, several months later, in 1945.

== Preventing capture ==
Other than as a way to cause enemy casualties, another situation in which some militaries and related bodies (such as intelligence agencies) encourage their own members to commit suicide is to avoid being captured by the enemy. The concept also often includes the use of intentional friendly fire. Either to avoid disclose of military secrets, avoid the need for a prisoner exchange, or for more intangible ideological motives. Individuals are encouraged by a perception that capture is a fate worse than death, and the likelihood of torture is strongly emphasised in internal propaganda. Sometimes, to the point that even civilians embrace the concept of dying (or killing people on their own side) to avoid capture.

The militaries of nation states often avoid equipping their troops with any means specifically designed to facilitate suicide, but sometimes imply that soldiers are obliged to resort to extreme measures to avoid capture including taking their own lives, or killing their comrades, with whatever means are available. Hand grenades have been repeatedly used or suggested. There are religious debates about whether this is acceptable.

In 1952, three Chinese soldiers reportedly killed themselves with hand grenades to avoid capture.

=== Sicarii in the First Jewish–Roman War ===
The Sicarii Jewish sect are sometimes described as carrying out "suicidal" attacks against their enemies. Riaz Hassan said that the first-century AD Jewish Sicarii sect carried out "suicidal missions to kill" Hellenized Jews they considered immoral collaborators. However, they are more known for having committed mass suicide, and family murders, to avoid capture during the Siege of Masada. The story of Masada is prominent in Israeli culture.

=== Jauhar (alleged Hindu mass suicides) ===
Jauhar, sometimes spelled Jowhar or Juhar, was a Rajput kshatriya women practice of mass self-immolation by women and girls in the Indian subcontinent to avoid capture, sex slavery, enslavement, and rape when facing certain defeat during a war. Some reports of jauhar mention women committing self-immolation along with their children. This practice was historically observed in the northwest regions of India, with the most famous jauhars in recorded history occurring during wars between Hindu Rajput kingdoms in Rajasthan and the opposing Muslim armies. Jauhar was only performed during war, usually when there was no chance of victory. Jauhar involved Hindu Rajput women committing suicide with their children and valuables in a massive fire, in order to avoid capture and abuse in the face of inescapable military defeat. At the same time or shortly thereafter, the men would ritualistically march to the battlefield expecting certain death, which in the regional tradition is called saka.

Jauhar by Hindu kingdoms has been documented by Muslim historians of the Delhi Sultanate and the Mughal Empire. Among the most often cited examples of jauhar is the mass suicide committed in 1303 CE by the women of Chittorgarh fort in Rajasthan, when faced with the invading army of the Khalji dynasty of the Delhi Sultanate. The jauhar phenomenon was also observed in other parts of India, such as in the Kampili kingdom of northern Karnataka when it fell in 1327 to Delhi Sultanate armies.

There is an annual celebration of heroism called the Jauhar Mela in Chittorgarh where the local people commemorate their ancestors.

=== 17th century Dutch in China ===
In the late 17th century, Qing official Yu Yonghe recorded that injured Dutch soldiers fighting against Koxinga's forces for control of Taiwan in 1661 would use gunpowder to blow up both themselves and their opponents rather than be taken prisoner. However, Yu may have confused such suicidal tactics with the standard Dutch military practice of undermining and blowing up overrun positions, which almost cost Koxinga his life during the Siege of Fort Zeelandia.

=== Jack Nissenthall ===
Jack Nissenthall survived his mission against the Nazis in WWII, but the plan was for him to kill himself or be killed if he was at risk of capture. Nissenthall was a British special forces operative, his mission was to investigate or destroy Germany's Freya radar station during the Dieppe Raid, accompanied by 11 Canadian soldiers from the South Saskatchewan Regiment. He was provided with a cyanide pill to use for suicide if he was captured. His 11 Canadian "body guards" were also told to kill him if necessary to avoid his capture. Nissenthall survived, but 10 of his 11 "bodyguards" were killed or captured.

=== 21st Century soldiers ===
Military commanders have reportedly recommended explosives such as hand grenades as a means of suicide, for the advantage of killing as many of the would-be captors as possible, thus converting the situation into an improvised suicide attack.

== Armed hostage takings ==
=== Chechnya ===
Black Widow (Note: Russian: чёрная вдова, chyornaya vdova or Shahidka (Russian: шахидка—Russian feminine gender derivation from shahid) is a term Russian media used to refer to female Chechen suicide bombers. They became known at the Moscow theater hostage crisis of October 2002. The commander Shamil Basayev referred to the shahidkas as a part of force of his suicide bombers called the Riyad-us Saliheen Brigade of Martyrs. Basayev also stated that he himself trained at least fifty of the Black Widows. The female suicide bombers have carried out over 65% of the 23 terrorist attacks linked to the Chechen movement since 2000. The Black Widows are associated with terrorist attacks in Chechnya between 1999 and 2005. The term "Black Widows" probably originates from these women being widows of men killed by the Russian forces in Chechnya (the connotation of black widow spider is intended). The Black Widows wear black dresses and dark clothing that covers their bodies from head to toe. This attire is supposed to symbolize their personal losses from the Chechen wars. The women took part in hostage taking, women were needed because amongst the Islamists it was culturally unacceptable for men to be with female hostages.

== Failed and aborted suicide attacks ==
Sometimes suicide attacks are seen as heroic or successful even if the original goal – causing substantial enemy casualties or damaging to their military – is not completed as planned.

=== Operation Samson (1947) ===
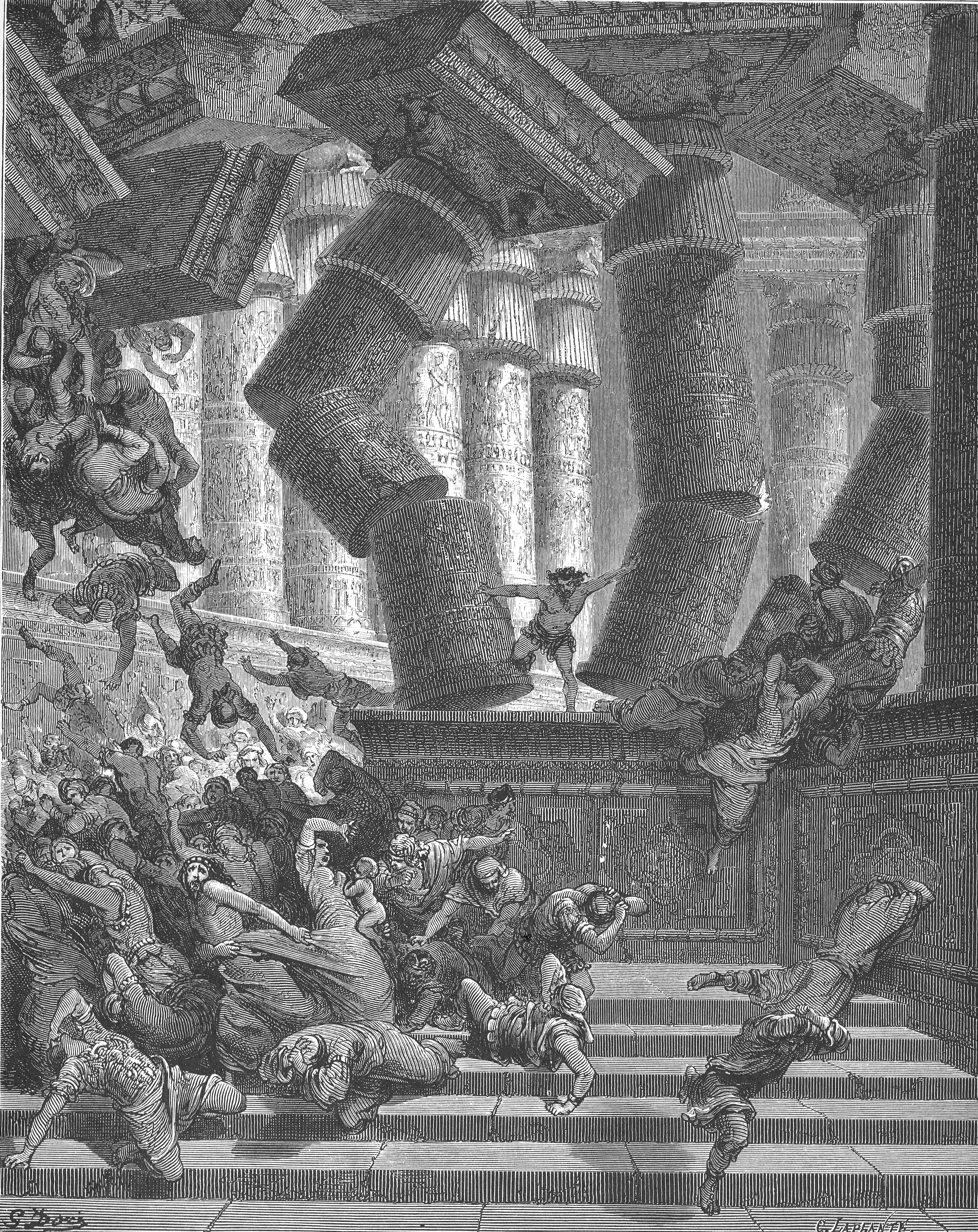
Illustration of Samson by Gustave Doré, the illustrator of the Bible that was handed to the British prison guard by an Etzel militant who blew himself up moments later.

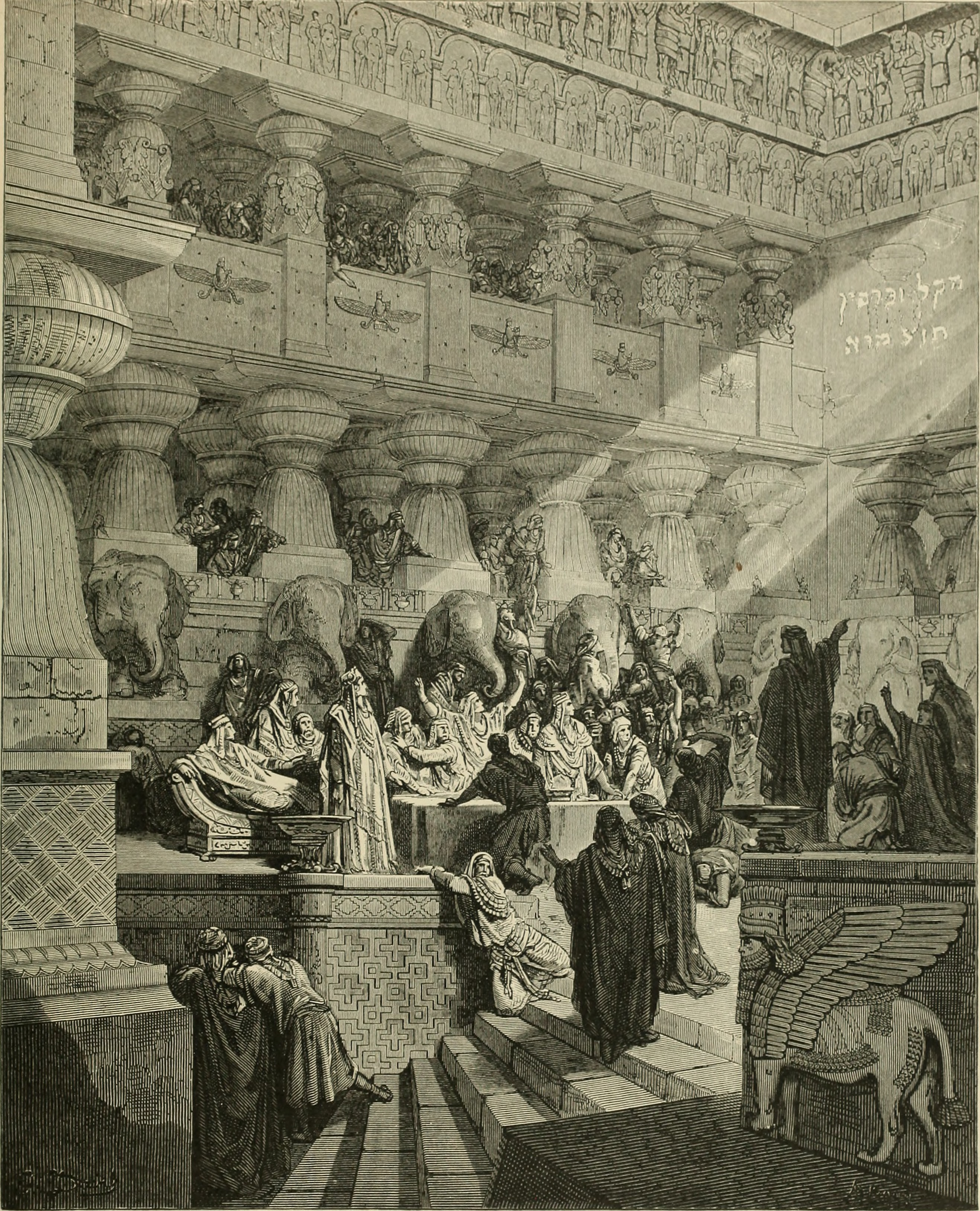
Gustave Doré's illustration of the writing on the wall from Daniel 5:25 "Mene! Mene! Tekel Upharsin!" Hebrew: מנא מנא תקל ופרסין

The Irgun and Lehi militant groups were very influential for later movements. The two groups collaborated on at least one intended suicide attack during their insurgency against the British (before the 1948 Palestine war). However, two of their own militants were the only casualties of their best documented plan. A Lehi militant and an Irgun militant blew themselves up in Jerusalem Central Prison, using improvised grenades that had been constructed by another Lehi prisoner. The explosives were disguised as oranges to hide them from the guards, and smuggled in with the prisoners' food. The two militants are praised in The Revolt, written by Irgun commander Menachem Begin.

Both militants had been sentenced to death by hanging. The British military had responded to attacks from the Irgun and Lehi by reintroducing the death penalty for terrorism. The Lehi militant, who was about 21, was sentenced to death for carrying a grenade during a British imposition of martial law. Sympathetic sources say he was on a mission to assassinate Brigadier A.P. Davis, the commander of the Ninth Division, with a Mills grenade. But during the British War on terror in Palestine, merely carrying a weapon was sufficient for a death sentence. The Irgun militant had been sentenced to death alongside another Irgun militant for their role in the bombing of Jerusalem Train Station. The other militant later had his sentence commuted to life in prison. There was heated debate about the age of the Irgun suicide militant when he was sentenced. His mother and brother claimed he was 17, too young to be executed according to the law of the British authorities. The court claimed he was 23, since the boy had served in the British military during World War II, and the authorities refused to believe they had recruited a minor who was lying about his age. Yehuda Lapidot and the IDF say he was born on 5 October 1927. Surviving relatives disagree, maintaining that he was born in July 1929. In his book, The Revolt, Irgun commander Menachem Begin praised both of the condemned militants for reacting to their death sentence with alleged enthusiasm, "These two wonderful young men greeted the sentence with the singing of Hatikvah".

The original plan, which the Lehi called "Operation Samson", was to carry the concealed grenades with them as they were taken to the gallows then use them to carry out a suicide attack against the executioners. But the explosives detonated early, while the two of them were alone together in their cell. Allegedly when the pair learned that Rabbi Goldman would be present at the time of the execution, they changed the plan and committed suicide alone together shortly before they were scheduled to be taken to the gallows. In The Revolt the Irgun commander alleged previous executed militants had not been allowed to see a Rabbi in their last moments.

Another version of the story is that the person the militants were unwilling to harm was actually one of the British prison guards. Before they blew themselves up, the Irgun boy gave his Bible to the guard, the Bible was illustrated by Gustave Doré and had been given to the militant by his older brother. Some allege the book showed signs of being repeatedly opened on the page depicting Samson's suicide. Foreign newspapers reported that they wrote "Mene! Mene! Tekel Upharsin!" from Daniel 5:25, on the walls of their shared death row cell, shortly before they blew themselves to pieces.

Israeli newspapers quote the father of the Lehi militant, years after the event, thanking the militant who constructed the bombs for "saving the honour of Israel".

The Irgun commander, Menachem Begin praised the suicides but claimed that it did not count as a suicide, he said the deaths were entirely the fault of the British. Begin, wrote about the deaths in the May 1947 issue of Herut, the Irgun's illegal underground newspaper. Begin referred to his own militant by his amputated left arm (Hebrew: מאיר הגדם, lit. 'Meir the Stump'), and the Lehi militant's father who was a Kabalist Rabbi. The proclamation also included four Irgun men executed in Acre the week before, but named only Dov Gruner and used only his first name. (Note: The four militants were Mordechai Alkahi, Yehiel Dresner, Eliezer Kashani, and Dov Gruner. executed by hanging in Acre on 16 April 1947.)

"a force stronger than any weapon, more formidable than any armor, was created in the homeland. That night the legend was born. The legend of Acre and Jerusalem … Meir and Moshe crushed their bodies, but who would crush the legend of Meir the Stump, the legend of Moshe son of the Kabbalists, the legend of that death, which was unparalleled in the annals of the wars of liberation?"

— Menachem Begin, Thanks to those who conquered death, in Herut (May 1947).

The story of their deaths frequently featured in political speeches of the Irgun commander and his political successors in the Likud party. In 2007, The Jerusalem Post described the double suicide as "One of the best-known stories of heroism leading to the creation of the State of Israel". In 2007, prison guard's son returned the Bible to the militant's nephew, in a ceremony with a speech by Ehud Olmert. Olmert claimed the reason they abandoned the planned attack was mercy for the guard. In 2009 the Likud-led government introduced controversial changes to the high school curriculum that included a study unit focused on the suicides and other martyred pre-state militants. In 2010 two Arab Israeli Knesset members (KM) were ejected from the chamber after heckling a speech by Benjamin Netanyahu memorializing the militants (the 2 suicides and 10 who were hung). Another KM, and Nissim Ze'ev, yelled "Haniyeh is waiting for you in Gaza".

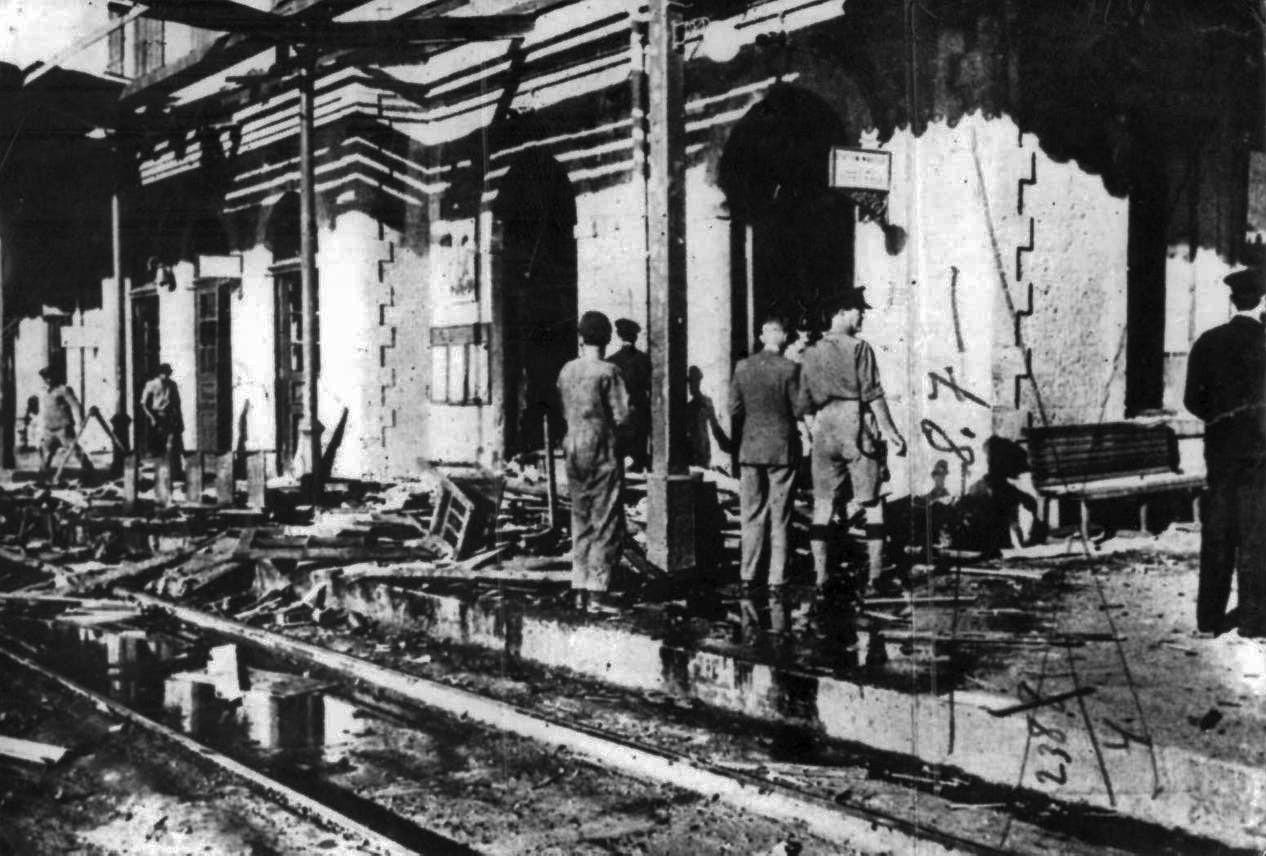
The Irgun militant who blew himself up had been sentenced to death for his role in the bombing of Jerusalem railway station with a suitcase bomb

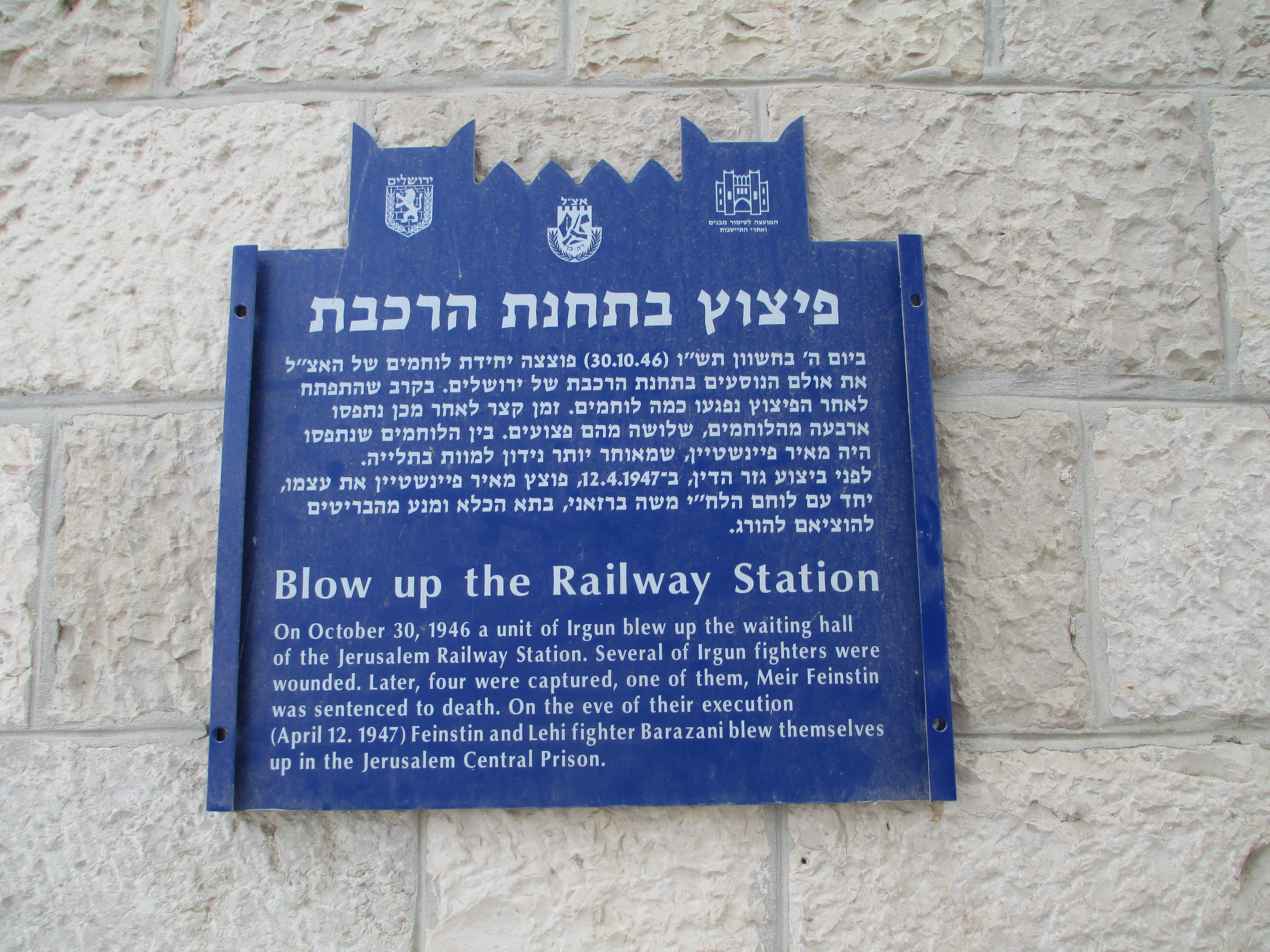
Plaque at the train station about the bombing and the suicide, but omitting the British sapper who died defusing the bomb (Note: Note: the date is incorrectly shown as 12 April, other sources say the night of 21 April 1947.)

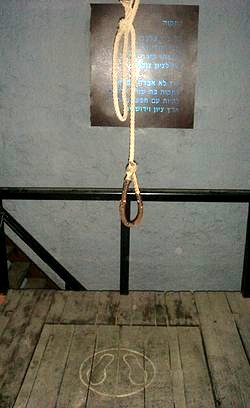
Gallows in the Museum of Underground Prisoners. (Note: Media related to Gallows at the museum of the Underground Prisoners at Wikimedia Commons)

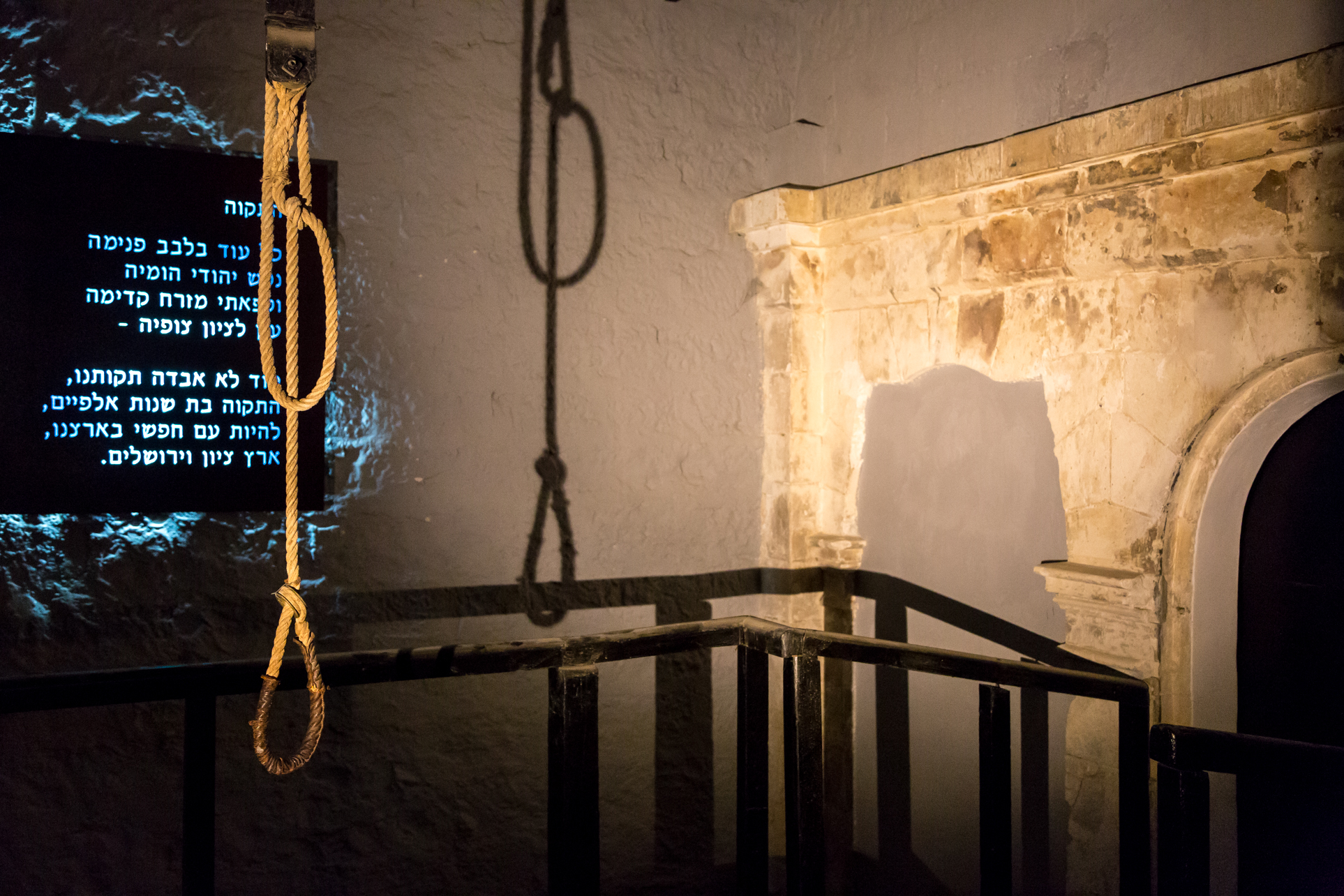
The intended location of the suicide atrack was the gallows, but both IEDs donated earlier than planned, killing only the militants. (Note: Most sources say this was a last moment change of plan when Rabbi Jacob Goldman insisted on attending the hanging.)

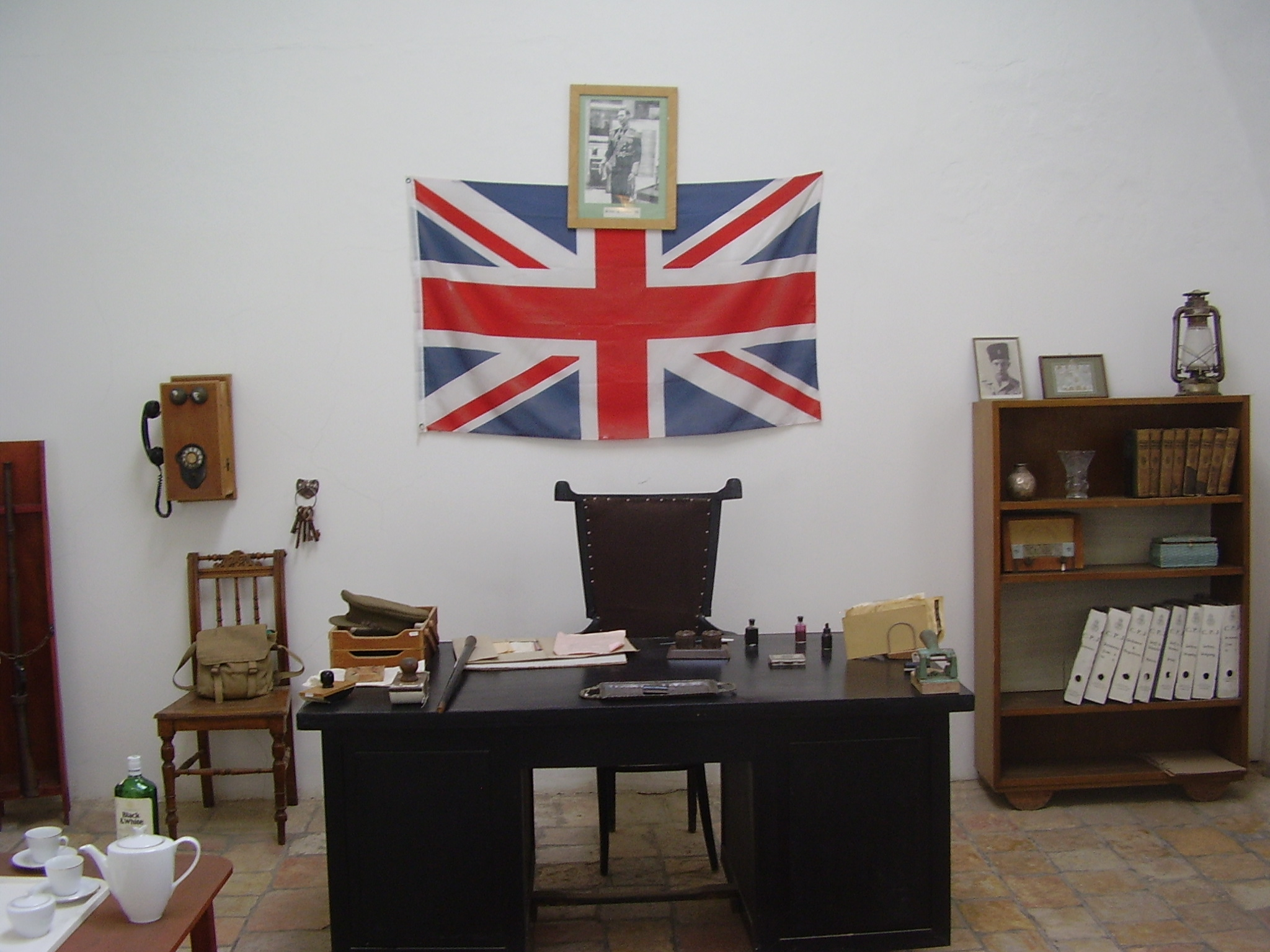
Office of the warden, one of the intended victims. Reconstructed in the Museum of Underground Prisoners. (Note: Interior reconstructed in the Museum of Underground Prisoners Media related to Interior of the museum of the Underground Prisoners at Wikimedia Commons)

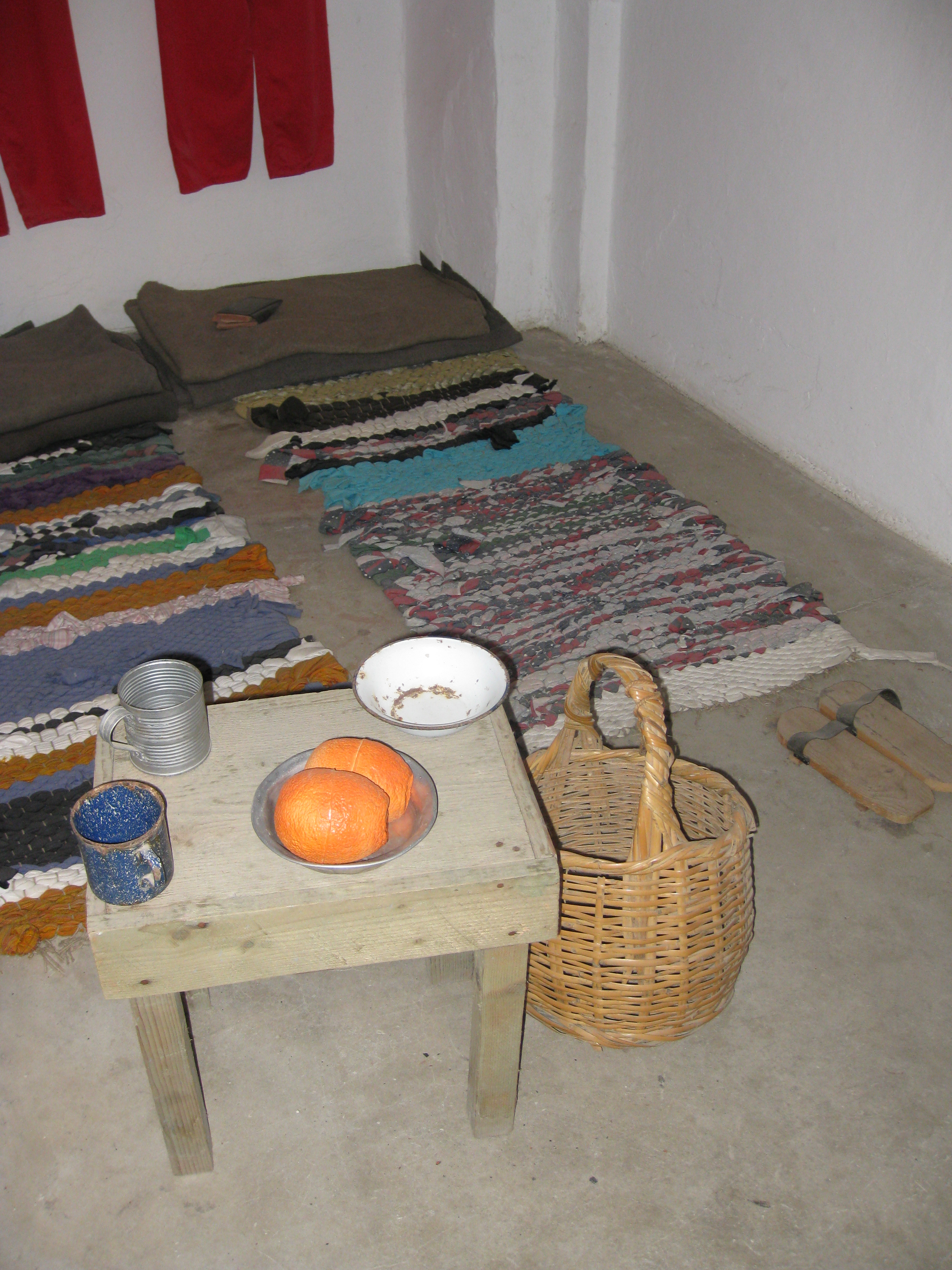
Reconstructed death row cell with oranges, representing the disguised IEDs.

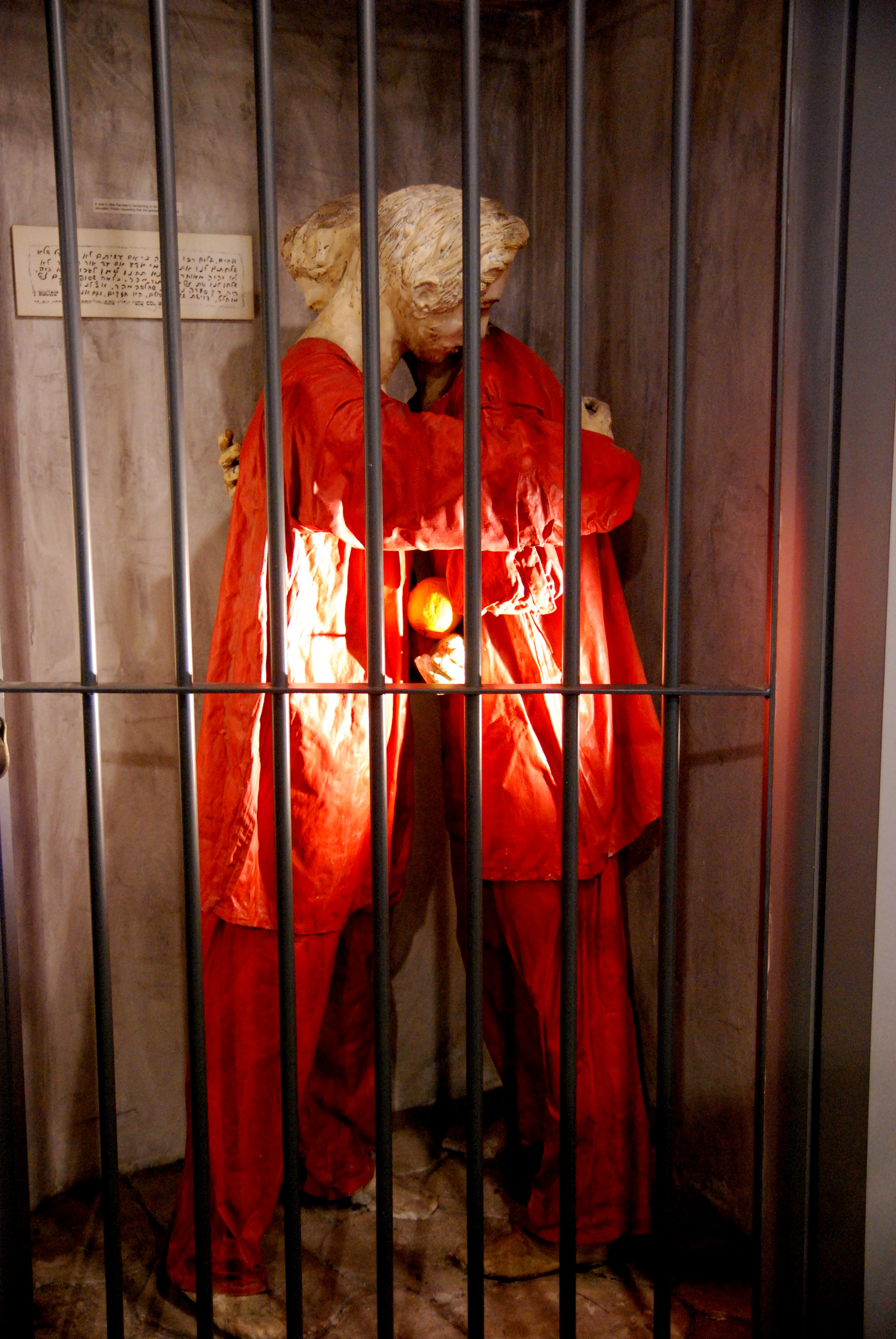
Mannequins in the Lehi Museum posed to replicate the suicide.

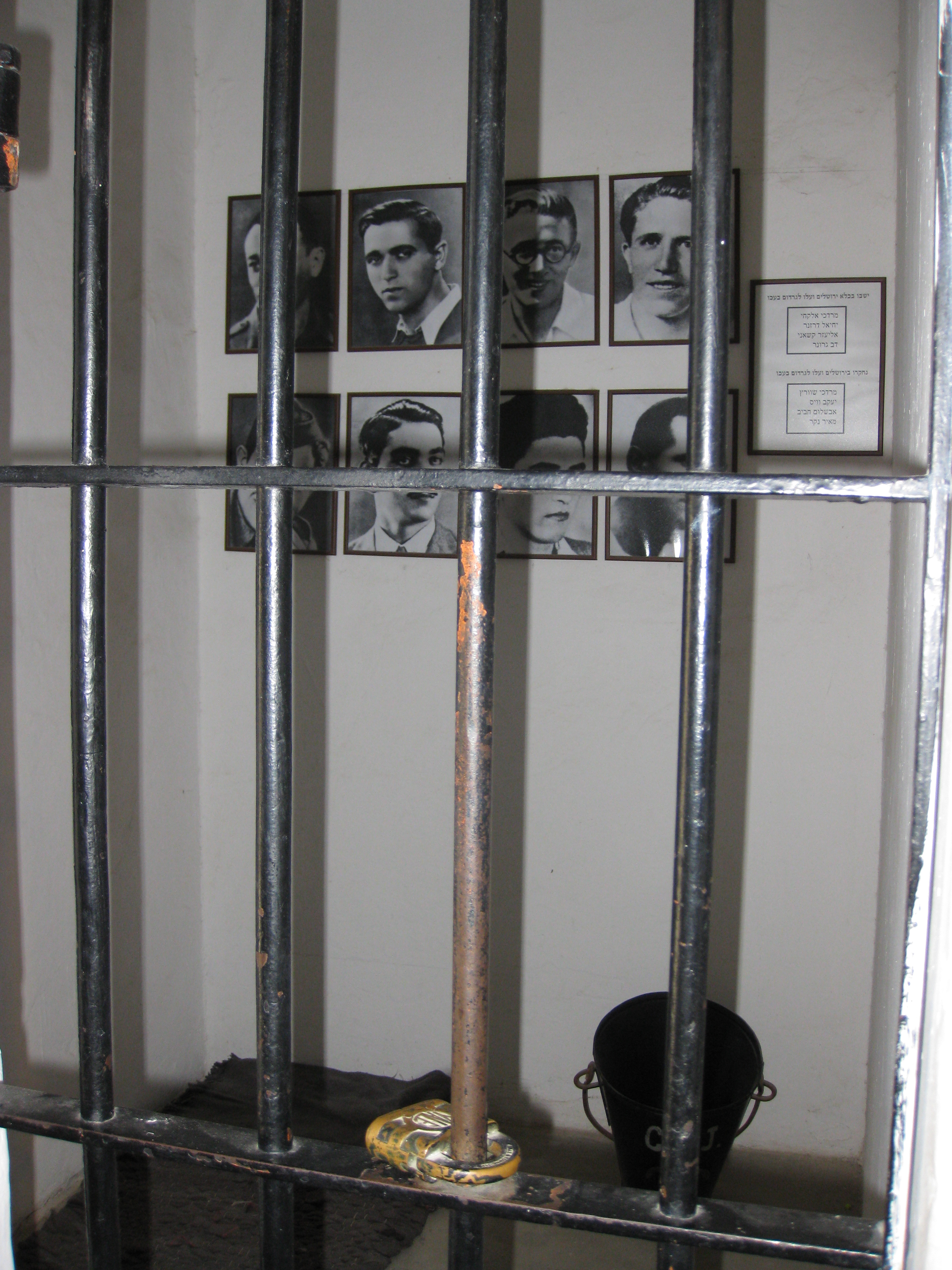
Eight other militants were hung, all at Acre Prison. (Note: According to The Revolt, the plan was originally devised for Dov Gruner, top left. But before it could be carried out, he was relocated to Acre Prison, where he was executed alongside the other three on the top row.)

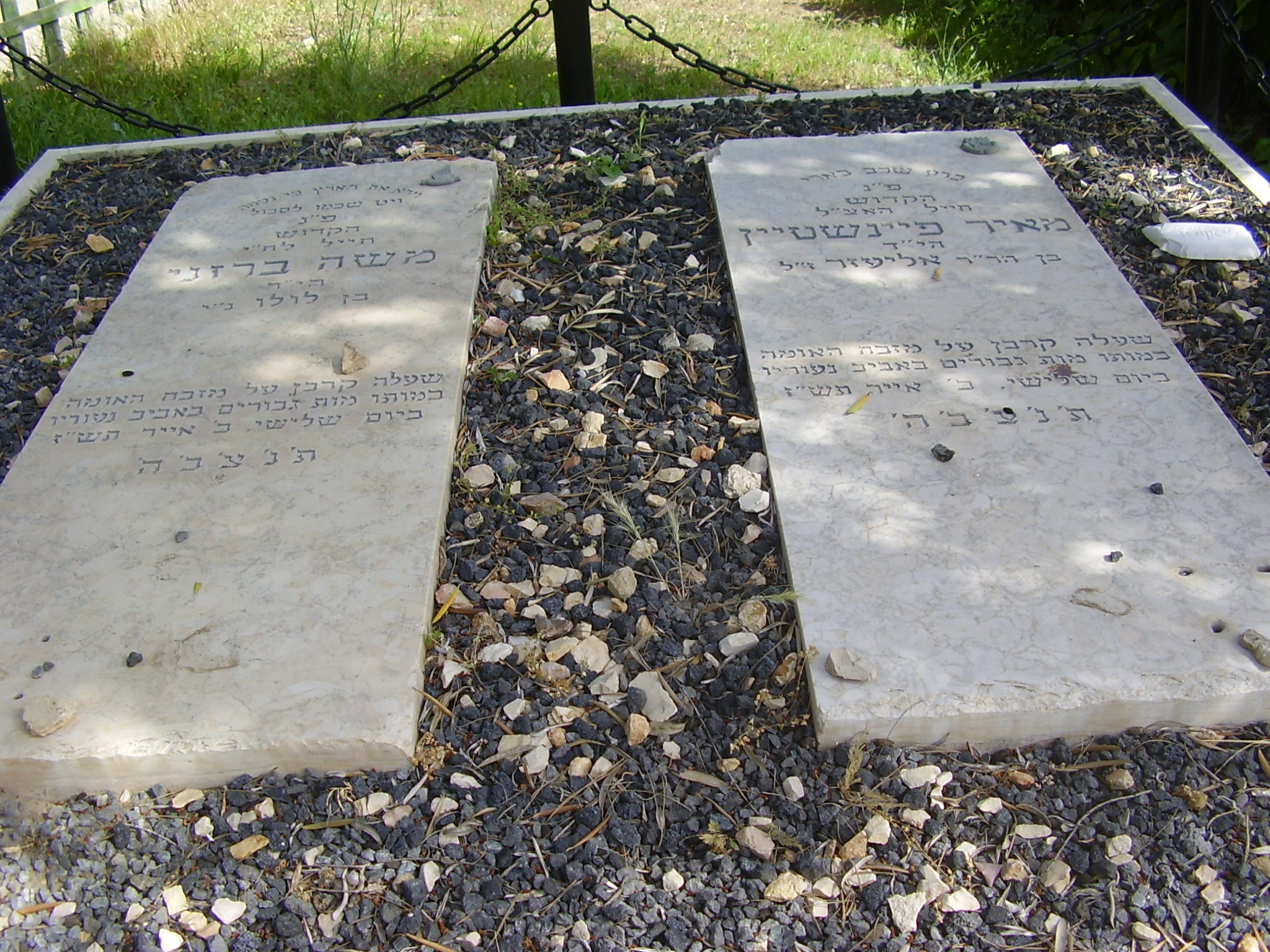
Their original tombstones are outside were moved to the Museum of Underground Prisoners when their graves were given military tombstones.

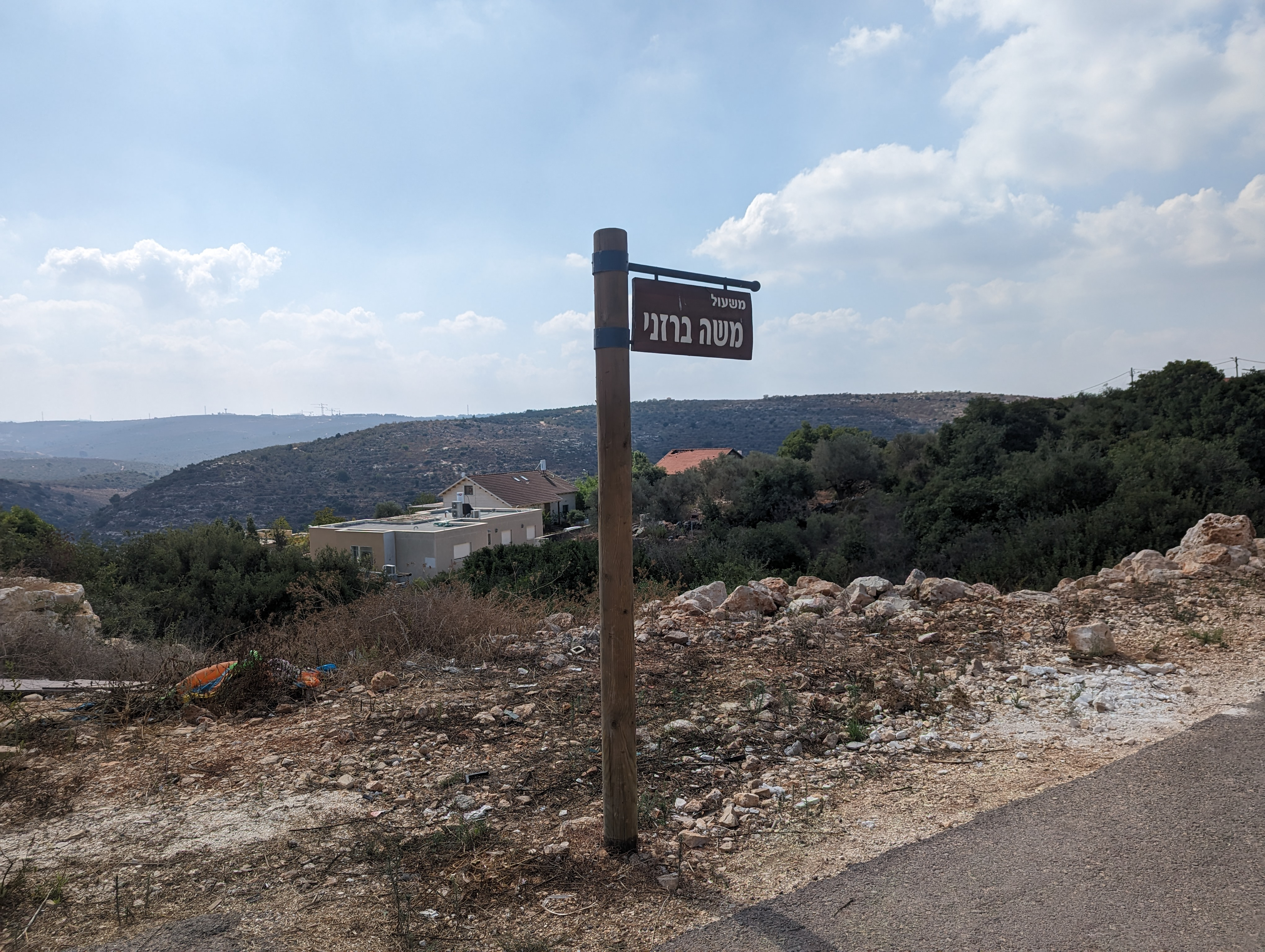
Sign for a path named after the Lehi militant, in the Yair Farm settlement (named after Lehi founder Yair Stern), in the West Bank, Palestine.

== See also ==
- Forlorn hope – Military trope
- Friedrich Glasl's model of conflict escalation – Model that assists in the analysis of conflicts
- Green Light Teams – American special forces tasked with nuclear deployment behind enemy lines
- Gallipoli campaign – Military campaign during World War I
- Banzai charge – Term for Japanese human wave attacks during WWII
- Hannibal Doctrine § Controversy within the IDF
- Kaiten – Japanese manned suicide torpedoes used by the Imperial Navy in World War II
- Kamikaze – 1944–1945 Japanese suicidal aircraft attacks
- Last stand – Situation in which a military unit holds against overwhelming odds
- Samson Option – Israel's deterrence strategy of massive retaliation with nuclear weapons
- Seppuku – Ritualistic suicide by disembowelment, also known as Harakiri
- Suicide protest – Intentionally causing one's own death as protest
- Self-immolation – Suicide by setting oneself on fire
- Hunger strikes – Form of protest or political activism
- Mass suicide – Groups of people killing themselves together
- Suffragette bombing and arson campaign – 1912–14 campaign orchestrated by British suffragettes

=== In fiction ===
- Suicide Mission - the final level of Mass Effect 2
- Suicide Squad - a fictional espionage group in DC Comics who are sent on suicide missions
