= Night of the Beatings =

1946 cycle of violence in Mandatory Palestine

- Part of Jewish insurgency in Mandatory Palestine
- Location: Mandatory Palestine
- Planned by: Irgun
- Target: British soldiers
- Objective: Retaliation for corporal punishment of Irgun member
- Date: 29 December 1946; 79 years ago
- Outcome: British soldiers flogged; increased British reprisals and crackdown on Jewish insurgents; eventual abolition of corporal punishment, introduction of capital punishment
- Casualties: 1 Irgun member killed, four Irgun members captured (three later executed)

The Night of the Beatings (Hebrew: ליל ההלקאות) refers to an Irgun operation carried out on December 29, 1946, in the British Mandate of Palestine, in which several British soldiers were kidnapped and flogged in retribution for a corporal punishment handed down to an Irgun member.

== Background ==
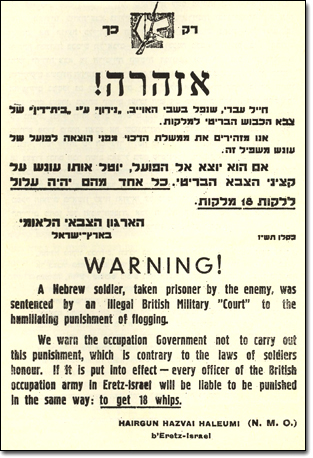
Irgun poster warning the British not to carry out the flogging punishment.

On September 13, 1946, the Irgun robbed a bank in Jaffa. Three of the perpetrators - Benjamin Nes, Eliezer Sudit, and Benjamin Kimchi - were caught and tried a few days later. Nes and Sudit were convicted of robbery and illegal possession of firearms and were given long sentences, while Kimchi was also convicted of discharging a firearm with intent to endanger life. He refused to recognize the British court's jurisdiction and was sentenced to an eighteen-year imprisonment and eighteen lashes. Twelve lashes was also the punishment given to another Irgun member, Aharon Katz, for possession of propaganda material.

Upon notification about the punishment, the Irgun headquarters convened and decided that such a "humiliating" punishment was not to be tolerated. It published a warning, in Hebrew and English, to the British authorities not to carry out the flogging, threatening to do the same to British officers.

On Saturday, December 28, Kimchi was lashed eighteen times.

== Operation ==
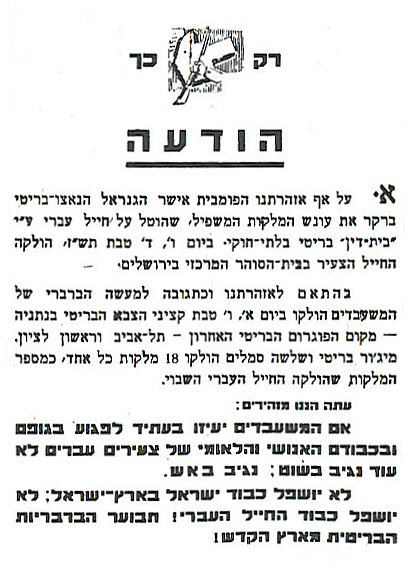
Irgun poster threatening to respond "with fire" to further lashing punishments.

After Kimchi's sentence was carried out, armed Irgun squads were sent into the streets of Jewish cities throughout Palestine, with orders to abduct and flog British soldiers.

In Netanya, armed Irgun men broke into the Hotel Metropole where they found Major Paddy Brett sitting with his wife in the lounge. He was kidnapped from the hotel, led to a eucalyptus grove, where he was stripped to his underwear, had his "sentence" read out to him, and was given eighteen lashes. His trousers were confiscated for future use by the Irgun, and he was returned to the hotel still in his underwear. At Cafe Theresa in Rishon LeZion, Irgun fighters seized Sergeant Terence Gillam and flogged him in the street. In Tel Aviv, two sergeants were kidnapped from the Armon Hotel, tied to a tree in a public park, and lashed eighteen times each.

The unprecedented incident caused an outrage in Britain and prompted a strong hand policy. The flogging punishment was later abolished, but capital punishment was introduced.

From 22:00 to 1:00 army cars drove around the streets of Tel Aviv and ordered the soldiers of the 6th Airborne Division to return to their bases. From Lod to Netanya, loudspeakers ordered the soldiers to return to their camps.

The British Army launched a large cordon and search operation in the Karton Quarter of Tel Aviv, and in Netanya, Petah Tikva and Rishon LeZion, to hunt for the perpetrators, placing curfews and questioning thousands of people. In the Kfar Saba area, roadblocks were set and a car transporting five armed Irgun men (carrying a whip) was caught. One of them, Avraham Mizrahi, was killed when fire was opened at the car, while four others - Eliezer Kashani, Mordechai Alkahi, Yehiel Dresner, and Haim Golevsky - were captured.

== Trial and hangings ==
After Kashani, Alkahi, Dresner and Golevsky were captured, they were held in a British paratroopers' camp, during which they were repeatedly subjected to severe beatings and humiliations. After five days, they were transferred to the Central Prison in Jerusalem.

On February 10, 1947, the trial of the four took place before a military court. They were tried on capital charges. They refused to participate in the proceedings. When given the opportunity to speak in their defense, they made defiant statements to the court. After ninety minutes, all four were convicted. Alkahi, Dresner, and Kashani were sentenced to death, while Golevsky was sentenced to life in prison as he was 17, too young for the death penalty under British law. Upon hearing their sentences, the four stood and began singing Hatikvah.

The three men were taken back to Jerusalem Central Prison, where they joined Dov Gruner on death row. The Palestine High Court rejected an appeal on their behalf filed by their attorney Max Seligman, and General Evelyn Barker, the commander of British military forces in Palestine, confirmed the sentences on the day his term expired and he left Palestine. The action shocked the Yishuv (Jewish community in Palestine), and the municipality of Petah Tikva, where Alkahi and two others were from, organized a petition on their behalf signed by 800 residents. However, the condemned men themselves reprimanded the petitioners in a public statement.

On April 15, the three men and Gruner were transferred to Acre Prison in strict secrecy, and on the early morning of April 16, all were executed by hanging.

In violation of British custom, no rabbi was present at the executions. The British authorities also decided not to permit the men to have a traditional Jewish burial, or to grant their final request that they be buried in Rosh Pinna, near the grave of Shlomo Ben-Yosef. Rather, the bodies were taken to Safed in a convoy that included tanks and armored cars, and buried in the cemetery there.
