= Olei Hagardom =

Twelve members of Zionist paramilitary organizations executed by the British

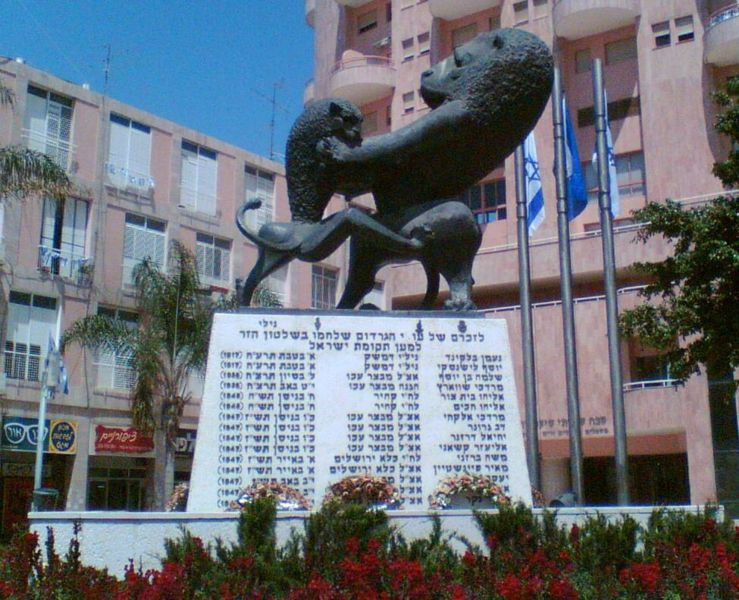
Monument commemorating the Olei Hagardom, Ramat Gan

Olei Hagardom (Hebrew: עולי הגרדום, lit. "those who ascended to the gallows") were members of the two Jewish Revisionist pre-state paramiliatary organisations Irgun and Lehi, most of whom were tried in British Mandate military courts and sentenced to death by hanging. Most of the executions were carried out at Acre Prison. There were 12 Olei Hagardom.

The term, which was coinage by the Irgun to describe underground militants hanged by the Mandatory government, does not include members of the Nili organisation hanged by the Ottoman government during World War I. The language chosen resonates with a positive moral evaluation: olei means 'he who ascends', while gardom (gallows) was a traditional term for Jews martyred in pogroms, the Holocaust and the like.

== History ==
The British Mandate for Palestine was an instrument of government instituted by the League of Nations for the administration of territories formerly under the rule of the Ottoman Empire. British rule lasted from 1917 to 1948.The British Mandatory authorities during their rule executed hundreds of residents of Palestine, the overwhelming majority being Palestinian Arabs.

At the outset of the 1936–1939 Arab revolt, the formal policy expressly reaffirmed by the Yishuv was a dual one, of reinforcing the Haganah, while at the same time exercising restraint (havlagah) by refraining from retaliation and privileging defensive measures such as the fortification of settlements. Nonetheless, the Yishuv was involved in countering the uprising. British forces coordinated with the Haganah, which systematically furnished mandatory authorities with information about Arabs reportedly involved in the revolt, information which led to the arrest of Palestinian militants. (Note: The informants used by the Haganah to testify before military courts were incentivated to make denunciations of crimes which would be punished by heavy sentencing. One was only paid if the suspected crime carried a penalty of 15 years. If the imputed crime brought about a death sentence, the informant was rewarded with £25 (Laurens 2002, p. 391)) Special Night Squads, composed of British soldiers and Zionist volunteers, which specialized in night raids on villages suspected of supporting the rebellion and summary executions people deemed to be members of armed bands.

At this period, a quarter of the estimated 5,000 Palestinian dead (in Walid Khalidi’s calculation) were killed by fellow Palestinians as a result of internecine fighting. The insurgents themselves killed somewhere in the range of 429-547 Jews, a figure which may, or may not include some 78 Jews serving with the Palestine Police Force. (Note: All figures, apart from those of British military casualties, are notoriously, uncertain given the complexities of definition. For a complete list and analysis see Hughes. (Hughes 2002, pp. 375–384))

Revisionist Zionists apart from Ze’ev Jabotinsky, harshly criticized this tactic of forbearance, and the movement's militant wing the Irgun, under the leadership of David Raziel, broke with self-restraint in July 1937, opting for a policy of ‘massive anti-Arab terrorism’. (Note: Between 1937 and 1939, Irgun fighters resorted to counterterrorism with no remorse. They ambushed and attacked Arab buses and cars, and hid explosives in milk cans and pickup trucks, killing or wounding scores of Arab civilians. Vowing not to let any Arab terror attacks go unanswered, the Irgun developed a sophisticated underground infrastructure to sustain their effort. And Irgun’s terrorism was not confined to the Arabs. Foillowing its 1936-1939 anti-Arab radicalization, the organization had also become increasingly hostile to the British.’(Sprinzak 1999, pp. 34–35))

With the outbreak of World War II, militant actions by the Irgun against the British were halted, but one of the leaders of the group, Avraham Stern, insisted that the fight must go on, leading to a split in the Irgun which led to the formation of a new group, Lehi (also known as the Stern Gang or Stern Group). In 1944, the Irgun, now headed by Menachem Begin resumed attacks on the British. On the night of 31 October-1 November 1945, the Yishuv via the Jewish Agency, ordered the Haganah to detonate 153 explosive charges on railroads throughout Palestine in an episode known as the Night of the Trains and thereafter Jewish militias united to form a Jewish Resistance Movement, which was active for several months, and gave the new High Commissioner, Alan Cunningham, the impression that the Jewish public was growing increasingly sympathetic to acts of terrorism carried out by the Jewish Resistance Movement and breakaway organizations by Lehi and the Irgun.

The term "Olei Hagardom" refers to the eight Irgun and two Lehi members who were executed during this period and a further member of each group who committed suicide prior to their intended executions. Two of the executions were carried out in Egypt in 1945. With the exception of Ben Yosef, all the executions and suicides within the British Mandate of Palestine occurred in 1947. They were tried under the Defence Emergency Regulations, enacted in September 1945. (Note: The regulations were repealed by Great Britain before its withdrawal from Palestine. Israel still regards these regulations as valid for the occupied West Bank and Gaza, though Jordan insists they were invalidated under Jordanian rule.(Dowty 2001, p. 218))

== List of Olei Hagardom ==
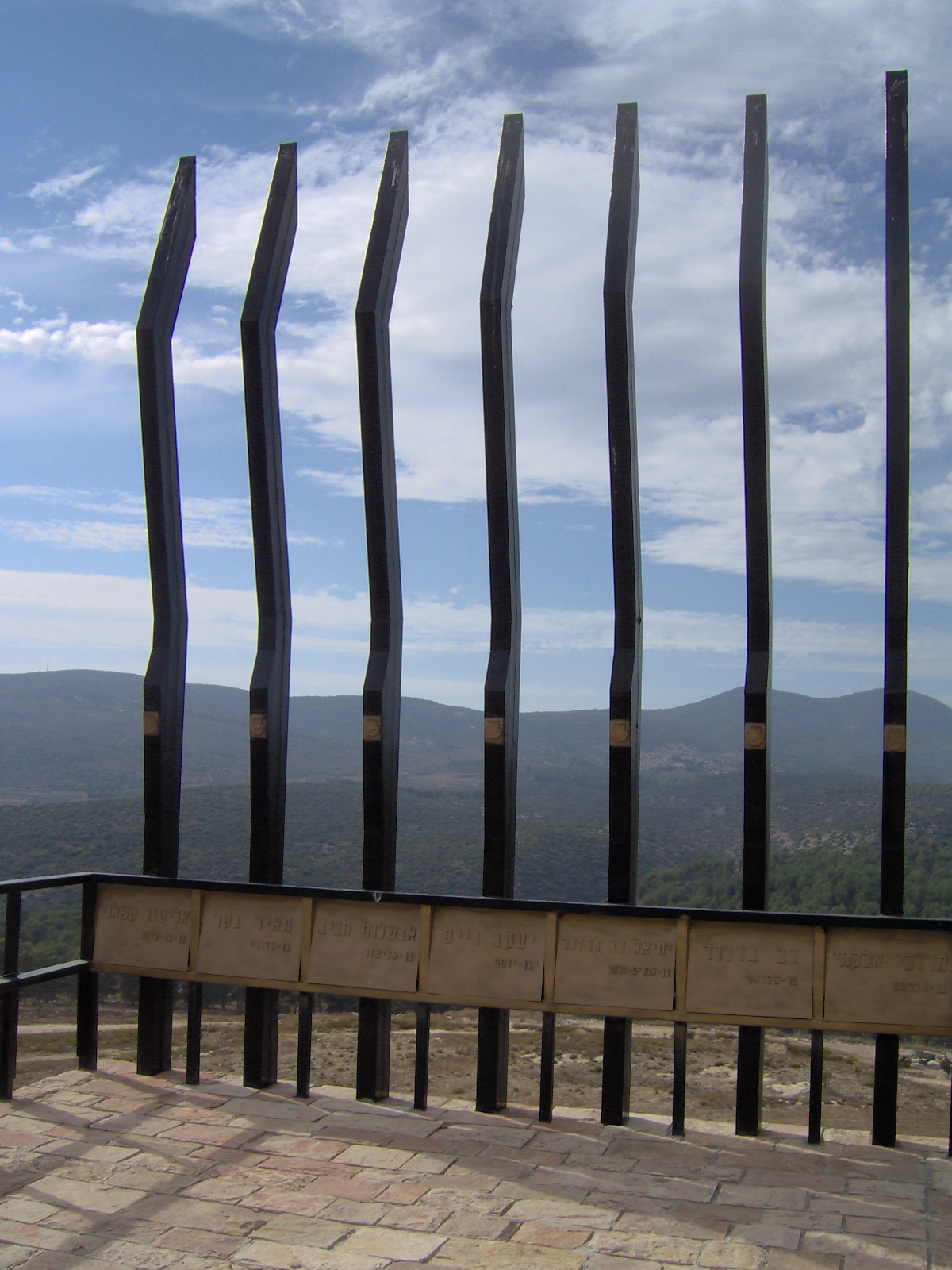
Monument to Irgun members in Safed

=== Original list ===
- Shlomo Ben-Yosef: An Irgun member who was the first Oleh Hagardom. He was arrested after an attack on a bus carrying Arab civilians in Safed. He was executed on June 29, 1938.
- Eliyahu Hakim, Lehi member executed in Cairo on March 22, 1945, for assassinating Lord Moyne in Cairo.
- Eliyahu Bet-Zuri, Lehi member executed in Cairo on March 22, 1945, for having participating in the assassination of Lord Moyne and the killing of Moyne's British Army chauffeur.
- Dov Gruner: Irgun member captured during a raid on the Palestine Police station in Ramat Gan in an operation to steal armaments. One Arab policeman was killed. Gruner was executed on April 16, 1947.
- Mordechai Alkahi: Irgun member arrested en route to an attack on British officers on the Night of the Beatings. Executed on April 16, 1947.
- Yehiel Dresner, Irgun member arrested en route to an attack on British officers on the Night of the Beatings. Executed on April 16, 1947.
- Eliezer Kashani, Irgun member arrested en route to an attack on British officers on the "Night of the Beatings". Executed on April 16, 1947.
- Meir Feinstein: Irgun member captured after planting three suitcase bombs at the Jerusalem train station, which killed one sapper endeavouring to remove them. He committed suicide on April 21, 1947, while awaiting execution.
- Moshe Barazani: Lehi member caught carrying a grenade. Committed suicide on April 21, 1947, while awaiting execution.
- Avshalom Haviv: Irgun member captured during the Acre Prison break, executed on July 29, 1947.
- Meir Nakar, Irgun member captured during the Acre Prison break, executed on July 29, 1947.
- Yaakov Weiss, Irgun member captured during the Acre Prison break, executed on July 29, 1947.

=== Expanded list ===
The original list of Olei Hagardom was later expanded after former Irgun commander Menachem Begin became Prime Minister of Israel.

- Na'aman Belkind, Nili member who spied for British military intelligence during World War I, executed by the Ottoman authorities in Damascus on December 16, 1917.
- Yosef Lishansky, Nili member who spied for British military intelligence during World War I. Executed by the Ottoman authorities in Damascus on December 16, 1917.
- Mordechai Schwarcz, Jewish police officer who fatally shot an Arab comrade, executed on August 16, 1938.
- Eli Cohen, Israeli spy captured in Syria after having infiltrated the Syrian government, executed on May 18, 1965.

== Barazani and Feinstein ==
Moshe Barazani and Meir Feinstein committed suicide in their prison cell with grenades smuggled to them in a basket of oranges. The grenades were placed inside hollowed out orange peels. The original plan was to carry the concealed grenades with them as they were taken to the gallows then use them to carry out a suicide attack, but allegedly after they learned that Rabbi Goldman would be present at the time of the execution, the plan was dropped. Instead, Barazani and Feinstein blew themselves up in their jail cell shortly before the execution.

== Irgun and Lehi actions to stop the executions ==
Menachem Begin refused to grant to condemned fighters a right to appeal for clemency. The Irgun adopted a policy of hostage-taking in response to British death sentences passed down on its members. After two Irgun fighters, Yosef Simchon and Michael Ashbel, were sentenced to death for raid on the Sarafand army base in 1946, the Irgun seized five British officers as hostages and threatened to hang them if the sentences were carried out. The sentences were commuted. After Dov Gruner and three other Irgun fighters captured during the Night of the Beatings were sentenced to death, the Irgun abducted a Tel Aviv district judge Ralph Windham and a British businessman, the former Major H.J. Collins, and threatened to kill its hostages if the sentences were carried out. Sir Alan Cunningham threatened to impose martial law on parts of Palestine if they were not released but announced a postponement to allow Gruner time to make an appeal to the Privy Council, whereupon the two hostages were released. In addition, Lehi also managed to get the death sentences of 18 of its members commuted at one point after threatening to kill 100 Britons in retaliation.

After Avshalom Haviv, Meir Nakar, and Yaakov Weiss were sentenced to death for their role in the Acre Prison break, the Irgun kidnapped two British Army Intelligence Corps sergeants, Clifford Martin and Mervyn Paice in Netanya. The Irgun announced that hanging its fighters would result in the subsequent hanging of the British soldiers. Haviv, Nakar, and Weiss were executed on July 29, 1947. The bodies of Clifford Martin and Mervyn Paice were subsequently found hanging from trees in a forest near Netanya. The area around and immediately below their bodies had been booby-trapped with a homemade bomb.

Menachem Begin spoke of the event saying: "it was one of the most bitter moments of my life but the cruel action in Netanya not only saved dozens of Jews from the gallows but also broke the neck of the British occupation, because when the gallows break down, the British rule, which relied on it, breaks on its own". After this event, there were no more executions of Jewish militants by the British.

== Commemoration ==
The Olei Hagardom, being the expression of minoritarian Zionist movements, were looked on with contempt by the early post-war government. The Acre Prison where several were incarcerated was converted into a mental health institution, perhaps to insinuate that the Lehi and Irgun militants who died there while challenging the central authority of Zionism, were insane. Menachem Begin conversely cultivated the myth of the Olei Hagardom, in order to underline the instrumental importance of these fighters in establishing the state of Israel and engrave it on Israel's collective memory. In his Herut party's myth, the form the executions took constituted the highest form of heroism, as one early book wrote, a 'triumph on the gallows.' Government officials rigorously boycotted Irgun and Lehi commemorations at the gravesites of militants. The strong association between a specific opposition party and the myth rendered its transformation into a national symbol even more difficult. It was only in the sixties when literature began to handle the topic that the partisan narrative's privileged heroes began to take a hold in Israeli imagination. One example is Haim Hazaz's In One Noose (1963), whose two protagonists, Meir Halperin (Feinstein) and Eliyahu Mizrahi (Barazani) exemplify the 'eternal Jew, who gives his life for the sanctity of God' and who symbolize the melding of Ashkenazi and Mizrachi identities.

In Israel today, the Olei Hagardom are widely commemorated as national heroes. Streets throughout the country are named Olei Hagardom Street or after individual Olei Hagardom, and postage stamps bearing their images have been issued. There are numerous monuments commemorating the Olei Hagardom in Israel. In Ramat Gan, the square in front of the British police station which Dov Gruner was captured while attacking is named Dov Gruner Square and an Olei Hagardom commemoration monument stands which features a statue of a lion cub representing the Yishuv fighting an adult lion representing the British Empire. A moshav in southern Israel is also named Misgav Dov after Gruner. An official commemoration ceremony for the Olei Hagardom takes place on Yom Hazikaron at the memorial in Rishon LeZion, which stands near Olei Hagardom Street, and the Knesset holds an annual memorial service for them. In 2009 Israeli high schools were instructed by the Education Ministry to include studies on the Olei Hagardom as part of their curriculum, which would include national competitions on essays, poems, and drawings on them.

== See also ==
- List of notable Irgun members
- The Forgotten Ten, a similar Irish group

== Sources ==
- Charters, David A. (1989). The British Army and Jewish Insurgency in Palestine, 1945-47. Palgrave Macmillan. ISBN 978-1-349-19975-4.
- Dowdy, Alan (2001). The Jewish State A Century Later. University of California Press. ISBN 978-0-520-22911-2.
- Goldstein, Amir (20 August 2015). "Olei Hagardom: Between official and popular memory". Journal of Israeli History. 34 (2): 159–180. doi:10.1080/13531042.2015.1068974. S2CID 153383967.
- Golani, Moṭi (2013). Palestine Between Politics and Terror, 1945-1947. Brandeis University Press. ISBN 978-1-611-68388-2.
- Hughes, Matthew (2019). Britain's Pacification of Palestine: The British Army, the Colonial State, and the Arab Revolt, 1936–1939. Cambridge University Press. ISBN 978-1-107-10320-7.
- "Extremists Kidnap British Judge in Palestine; Force Postponement of Gruner's Execution". Jewish Telegraphic Agency. 28 January 1947.
- Kashti, Or (22 December 2009). "New study unit on pre-state fighters proves controversial". Haaretz. Archived from the original on March 27, 2020.
- Laurens, Henry (2002). Une mission sacrée de civilisation. La Question de Palestine (in French). Vol. 2. Paris: Fayard. ISBN 978-2-213-60349-0.
- Melman, Yossi (9 March 2010). "What Happened to the 13th Militant?". Haaretz. Archived from the original on November 19, 2019.
- Nasr, K.B. (2007). Arab and Israeli Terrorism: The Causes and Effects of Political Violence, 1936-1993. McFarland & Company. ISBN 978-0-786-43105-2.
- Quigley, John (1994). "Israel's Forty-Five Year Emergency: Are There Time Limits to Derogations from Human Rights Obligations?" (PDF). 15 (2). Michigan Journal of International Law: 491–518.
- Sheleg, Yair (7 April 2007). "The good jailer". Haaretz. Archived from the original on 26 March 2009.
- Sicker, Martin (2000). Pangs of the Messiah:The Troubled Birth of the Jewish State. Greenwood Publishing Group. ISBN 978-0-275-96638-6.
- Sprinzak, Ehud (1999). Brother Against Brother:Violence and Extremism in Israeli Politics from Altalena to the Rabin Assassination. Free Press. ISBN 978-0-684-85344-4.
