= Mordechai Alkahi =

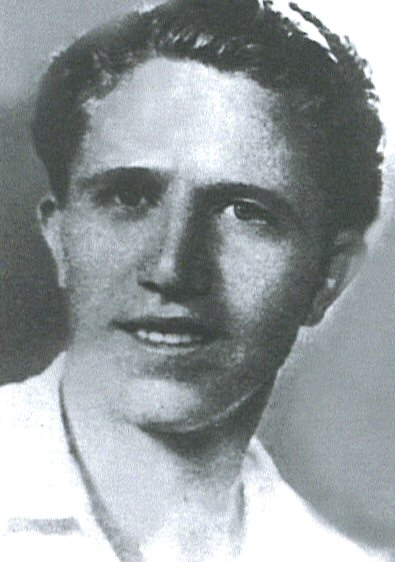
- Native name: מרדכי אלקחי
- Born: March 10, 1925; Petah Tikva, Mandatory Palestine
- Died: April 16, 1947 (aged 22) Acre Prison, Acre, Mandatory Palestine
- Cause of death: Execution by hanging
- Buried: Safed, Israel
- Allegiance: Irgun
- Conflicts: Jewish insurgency in Mandatory Palestine: Night of the Beatings (executed)

Mordechai Alkahi (Hebrew: מרדכי אלקחי; March 10, 1925 – April 16, 1947) was a member of the Irgun Jewish guerrilla organization in pre-state Mandatory Palestine, and one of 12 Olei Hagardom.

== Early life ==
Alkahi was born in Petah Tikva to an impoverished family. His parents were Jewish immigrants from Turkey. At age 14, he left school and began working to support his family. In his youth, he joined the Maccabi youth movement, a youth movement promoting physical activity and sports, and he became a prominent athlete, particularly in swimming. In 1941, he won first place in a national competition.

== Irgun activities ==
In late 1943, Alkahi joined the Irgun, which shortly afterward began an insurrection against British rule. After undergoing military training, he joined the Irgun's Combat Corps, or Hayil Kravi (HaK). Even after joining the Irgun, he continued to work in a factory by day, and took part in raids at night. His first Irgun operation was an attack on the Tegart fort in Qalqilya, one of the four Tegart forts attacked that night. The raid failed when the British police saw the attackers approach and poured a withering fire on them, wounding four and forcing them to retreat. Alkahi helped rescue the wounded during this attack.

Alkahi went on to participate in sabotage operations against the telephone network and railways, and arms raids on British camps in Netanya, Tel Aviv, and Rosh HaAyin. On April 23, 1946, he participated in an arms raid on the Ramat Gan police station, in which a large quantity of weapons and munitions were stolen. In the course of that operation, two Irgun fighters were killed and one, Dov Gruner, who would later hang alongside Alkahi, was captured.

On December 29, 1946, Alkahi took part in an Irgun operation that came to be known as the Night of the Beatings, in which several British soldiers were abducted and whipped after a captured Irgun member who had been sentenced to 18 years in prison and 18 lashes by a British military court was lashed. Alkahi was part of a team consisting of Eliezer Kashani, Yehiel Dresner, Avraham Mizrahi, and Haim Golevsky. Their car ran into a British roadblock in the Lydda area, and they were caught carrying a whip. The British opened fire, killing Mizrahi, and the survivors were arrested.

== Trial and execution ==
After Alkahi and the three surviving members of his team were captured, they were held in a British paratroopers' camp, during which they were repeatedly subjected to severe beatings and humiliations. After five days, they were transferred to the Central Prison in Jerusalem.

On February 10, 1947, the trial of the four took place before a military court. They were tried on capital charges of illegally possessing weapons. They refused to participate in the proceedings, and denied the authority of the court to judge them. When given the opportunity to speak in their defense, they made defiant statements to the court. After ninety minutes, all four were convicted. Alkahi, Dresner, and Kashani were sentenced to death, while Golevsky was sentenced to life in prison, as he was 17: too young for the death penalty under British law. Upon hearing their sentences, the four stood and began singing Hatikvah.

The three men were taken back to Jerusalem Central Prison, where they joined Dov Gruner on death row. The Palestine High Court rejected an appeal on their behalf filed by their attorney Max Seligman, and General Evelyn Barker, the commander of British military forces in Palestine, confirmed the sentences on the day his term expired and he left Palestine. The action shocked the Yishuv (Jewish community in Palestine), and the municipality of Petah Tivka, from where Alkahi and two others were from, organized a petition on their behalf signed by 800 residents. However, the condemned men themselves reprimanded the petitioners in a public statement:

"Do you not understand that your requests for clemency are an affront to your honor and the honor of the entire people? It represents servility towards the authorities reminiscent of the Diaspora. We are war prisoners and we demand that they treat us as war prisoners... At present we are in their hands... We cannot resist them, and they can treat us as they choose... But they cannot break our spirit. We know how to die with honor as befits Hebrews."

On April 15, the three men and Gruner were transferred to Acre Prison in strict secrecy, and on the early morning of April 16, Alkahi, along with Gruner, Dresner, and Kashani, were executed by hanging. All went to the gallows signing Hatikvah, and were joined by the other Jewish prisoners. In violation of British custom, no rabbi was present at the executions.

== Aftermath ==
The British authorities decided not to permit the men to have a traditional Jewish burial, or to grant their final request that they be buried in Rosh Pinna, near the grave of Shlomo Ben-Yosef. Rather, the bodies were taken to Safed in a convoy that included tanks and armored cars, and buried in the cemetery there. Neither the chevra kadisha nor the families were informed, and the British would guard the graves for months afterward to prevent the Irgun from secretly exhuming the bodies and fulfilling their wishes to be buried in Rosh Pinna. The executions were announced, and a curfew was imposed on the country. Hundreds of Jews defied the curfew and to come out onto the streets of Safed and marched to the cemetery. The executions were condemned by Jewish communities around the world, and American priests organized memorial services for them.

Today, Alkahi is considered a national hero in Israel, and streets are named for him in Tel Aviv, Jerusalem, and Beersheba.

== Other sources ==
- Mordechai Alkahi
- THE GALLOWS
- Bell, J. Bowyer, Terror out of Zion (1976)
