= Shlomo Ben-Yosef =

Irgun member (1913–1938)

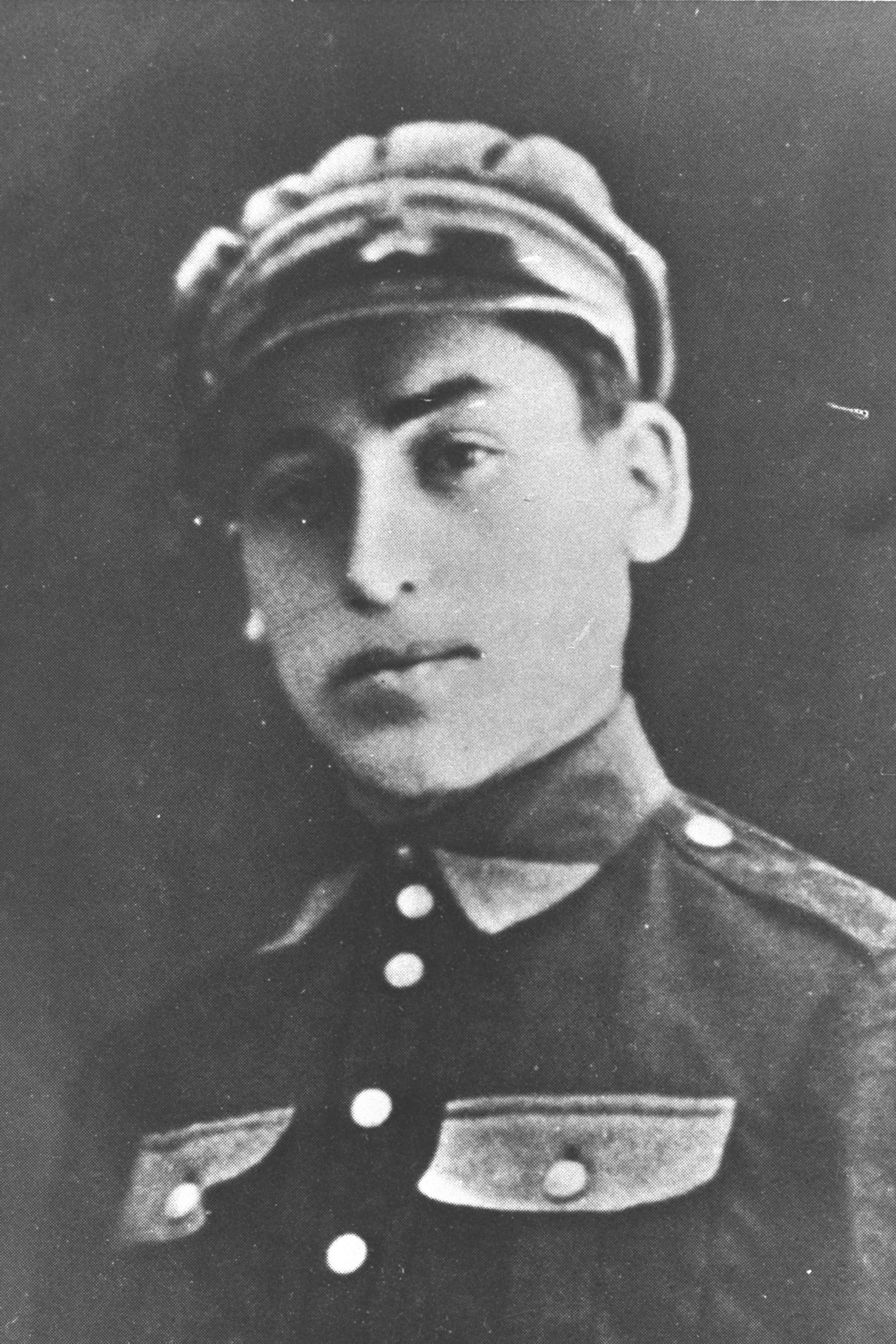
- Native name: שְׁלֹמֹה בֶּן-יוֹסֵף
- Born: Szalom Tabacznik; 7 May 1913; Lutsk, Volhynian Governorate, Russian Empire
- Died: 29 June 1938 (aged 25) Acre Prison, Acre, Mandatory Palestine
- Cause of death: Execution by hanging
- Allegiance: Irgun

Shlomo Ben-Yosef (Hebrew: שְׁלֹמֹה בֶּן-יוֹסֵף, lit. 'Solomon, son of Joseph'; 7 May 1913 – 29 June 1938) was a member of the Revisionist Zionist paramilitary group Irgun. He is most noted for his participation in a failed attack on a bus carrying Arab civilians on 21 April 1938, intended as a retaliation for an earlier attack by Arabs against Jews, and emblematic as a rejection of the establishment policy of Havlagah, or restraint. For this reason, and especially for having been the first Jew executed by the British authorities during the mandate period, Ben-Yosef became a martyr for the Revisionist cause and is commemorated by the State of Israel as one of 12 Olei Hagardom.

== Early life ==
Shlomo Ben-Yosef was born Szalom Tabacznik in Lutsk, in the Volhynian Governorate of the Russian Empire (now in Ukraine) to a religious Polish-speaking Jewish family. He joined the Revisionist Zionist youth movement Betar in 1928 and two years later, he became the family breadwinner after the death of his father.

In 1937, Ben-Yosef decided to emigrate to Mandatory Palestine. After his application for an immigration certificate was rejected, he illegally immigrated to Palestine, arriving on September 20, 1937. There, he joined the Betar labor company at Rosh Pinna - upon arrival there, he burned his Polish passport and changed his name to Shlomo Ben-Yosef. Shortly after arriving at Rosh Pinna, Ben-Yosef was accepted into the Irgun. He found a job at the port of Haifa.

== 1938 revenge attack ==
On 28 March 1938, a car containing 10 Jews was ambushed by Arabs on the Acre-Safad road and six of them were killed. In revenge, Shlomo Ben-Yosef (24), Avraham Shein (17) and Yehoshua "Shalom" Zurabin (19), all of whom were Betar members from Rosh Pinna, began planning a revenge attack.

On 21 April 1938, armed with a hand grenade and two guns, Ben-Yosef, Shein, and Zurabin ambushed an Arab bus staged on the Tiberias–Rosh Pina road, a mountain road near Safed. Their plan was to destroy the engine with a hand-grenade; as the bus approached, they shot at it and Ben-Yosef tossed the grenade, which failed to detonate it. The bus drove away.

The incident occurred at the crest of the 1936–1939 Arab Revolt, and during a high point in tensions between British authorities and the Revisionist Zionist movement. The three perpetrators were soon discovered hiding in a nearby cowshed in the possession of pistols and home-made bombs.

== Trial and execution ==
Ben-Yosef, Shein, and Zurabin were put on trial in the Haifa Military Court, charged with offenses under the Emergency (Defence) Regulations. They pleaded not guilty. Shein and Ben-Yosef were found guilty of discharging a firearm and carrying firearms, bombs and ammunition, but not guilty of a third charge of throwing bombs with intention to cause death or injury. Zurabin was found not guilty of all charges on grounds of insanity, and "ordered to be kept in custody as a criminal lunatic until further notice". Shein and Ben-Yosef were sentenced to death by hanging. According to Shlaim, as the verdict was announced, Shein and Zurabin stood up and shouted at the top of their voices: "Long live the Kingdom of Israel on both banks of the Jordan!" Shein's death sentence was commuted to life imprisonment when his birth certificate fetched from Poland proved he was under 18 years old. He was released from prison in 1946. General Robert Haining, the commander of British forces in Palestine, confirmed Ben-Yosef's death sentence, and an attempt by Ben-Yosef's counsel to secure a stay of execution was unsuccessful.

According to J. Bowyer Bell, there was hope that because the attack had not killed anyone, and that because Ben-Yosef was of good character and without any previous record, his death sentence would be commuted, as a similar case involving an Arab youth from Gaza who was found to be of good character had ended with a reprieve. However, the British authorities, who had executed convicted Arabs over the course of the Arab Revolt, wanted to hang Ben-Yosef as a demonstration of their even-handedness, and General Haining was pressured to confirm Ben-Yosef's death sentence by senior figures in the Palestine Mandate administration.

British authorities received many appeals for clemency from the Yishuv, from both Jewish organizations and individuals, and from the Jewish diaspora, which took great interest in the case. According to Bell, "it was so patent that the sentence related not to Ben-Yosef's crime but to the furtherance of British policy that outrage spread far beyond the Yishuv." Robert Briscoe, an Irish-Jewish politician, unsuccessfully sought a legal loophole to stay the execution. Due to his Polish citizenship, the Polish government also lodged a request for clemency in the name of Shalom Tabachnik. All requests for clemency were refused. David Ben-Gurion, then chairman of the Zionist Executive met with the British High Commissioner and begged him to pardon Ben-Yosef, despite his public opposition to the Irgun and the bombing. Ben-Yosef objected to the amnesty requests and rejected an Irgun plan to release him from prison. "Lehi" says Lexicon that he did so "in order to determine the image of a fearless Hebrew warrior who sacrifices his life for the sake of his people and his homeland." Before his death, Ben-Yosef wrote: "I am going to die, and I am not at all sorry, because I am going to die for our country!" The night before his execution, a group of journalists visited Ben-Yosef in his cell in Acre Prison, where he refused consolation, declared that he was proud to be the first Jew to go to the gallows, and said "in dying I shall do my people a greater service than in life. Let the world see that Jews are not afraid to face death." On the wall of his death cell, he etched out "to die or to conquer the height" and "death compared with one's country is nothing."

Ben-Yosef was executed in Acre Prison on 29 June 1938. Due to his execution date falling on Rosh Chodesh, no rabbi was available to give him consolation. While being escorted to the gallows, he sang the Betar anthem. Seconds before he was hanged, he called out "long live the Jewish state! Long live Jabotinsky!" Following his execution, his body was turned over to six Betar members waiting at the prison gates.

== Aftermath and legacy ==
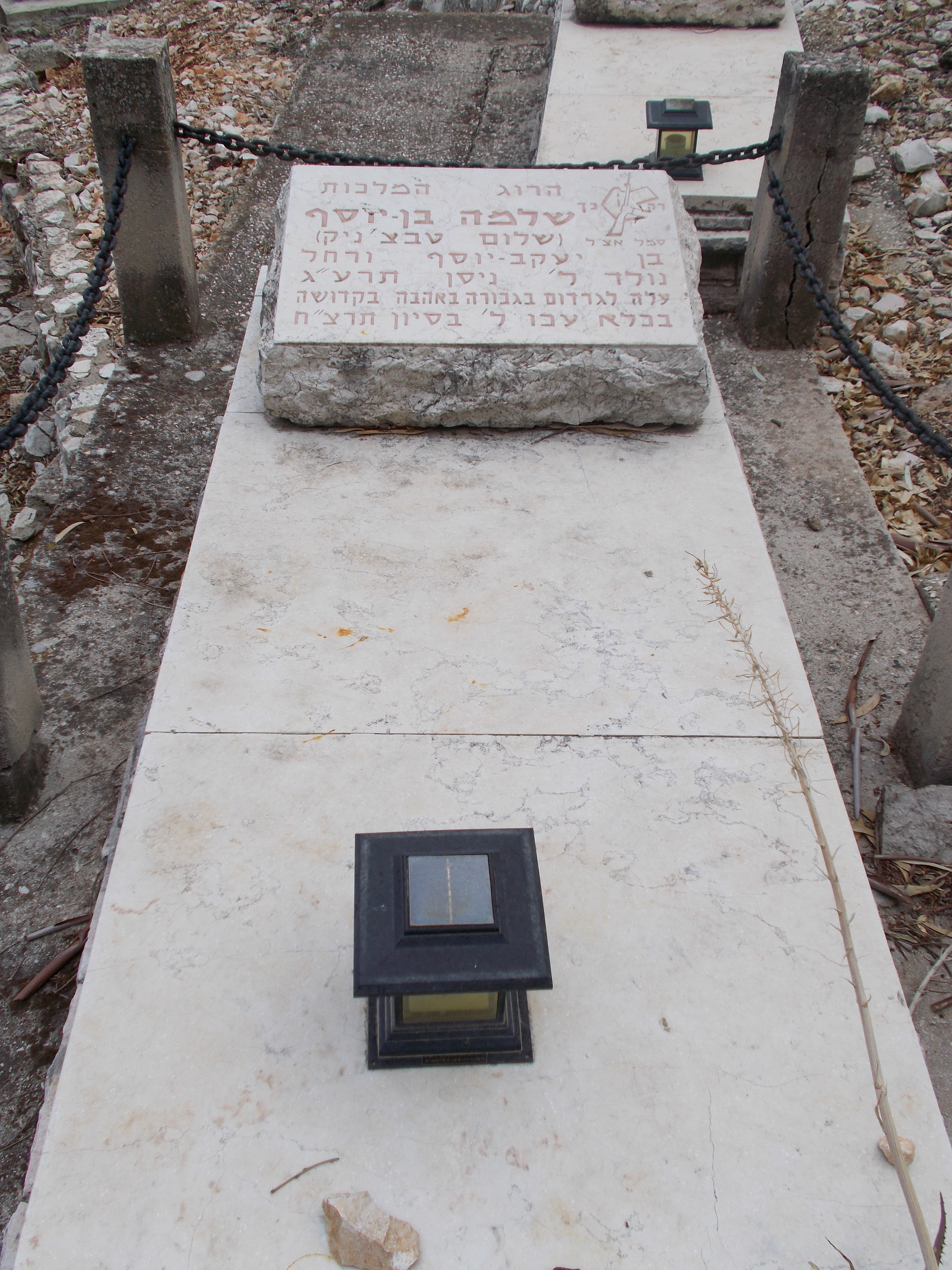
Ben-Yosef's grave, with the Irgun symbol in the upper-right-hand corner

Ben-Yosef's execution provoked outrage and mourning across the Yishuv. In Jerusalem and Tel Aviv, shops were closed and black flags were displayed from windows, and a demonstration against the execution in Tel Aviv was broken up by police. The British authorities imposed curfews in Tel Aviv and Jerusalem. A police guard was present at Ben-Yosef's funeral in Rosh Pina.

There were demonstrations of mourning across Jewish communities in Europe, particularly in Poland, where synagogues throughout the country were jammed with mourners, and tens of thousands of Jews fasted in mourning accordance with a plea by the rabbinate. In Kaunas, all Jewish theaters were closed as memorial services were held, and in Amsterdam, a stone wrapped in a note protesting "the murder of Ben Joseph" was thrown by Dutch Zionists through a window of the British consulate. Ben-Yosef's mother received cables of condolence from around the world, and Betar promised her a lifetime pension and to secure her immigration to Palestine.

The British policeman who served as Ben-Yosef's hangman, Inspector E.T. Turton, was fatally wounded in a Lehi bombing in 1942. His legs had to be amputated, and he died a week later.

Yehiel Dresner, then 15, would be radicalized by Ben-Yosef's execution, instilling in him an urge for vengeance against the British. He would be involved in numerous Irgun activities, for which he would be executed himself, along with three other men, on 16 April 1947. All four men would each be commemorated as one of the Olei Hagardom.

Ben-Yosef became a martyr for the Revisionist cause. Today, he is commemorated by some in Israel as one of the Olei Hagardom. Streets in Israel have been named for him, and he is commemorated on Olei Hagardom memorials throughout the country.

In 2010, two United Arab List Knesset members, Ahmad Tibi and Taleb el-Sana, were ejected from the chamber for heckling a speech by Benjamin Netanyahu about the Olei Hagardom. Tibi interrupted with, "They shot at a bus of civilians… they killed a minister. Is killing a minister permitted? Are they heroes or terrorists?" This was interpreted by Ynet as referencing Shlomo Ben-Yosef and the assassination of Lord Moyne by two Lehi militants.
