= Dov Gruner =

Zionist activist (1912–1947)

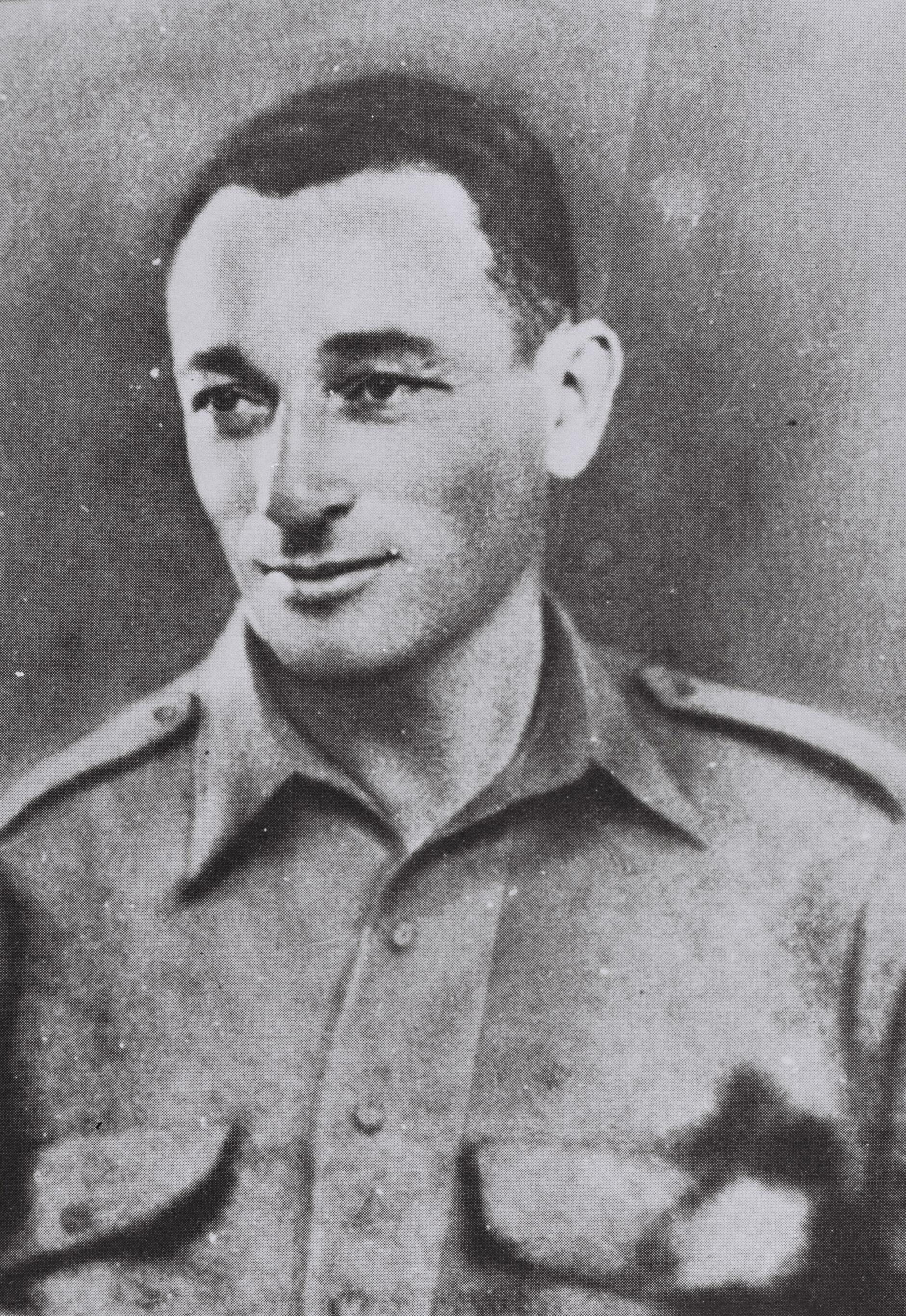
- Gruner while serving in the British Army
- Native name: דב בלה גרונר
- Born: December 6, 1912; Kisvárda, Austria-Hungary
- Died: April 16, 1947 (aged 34) Acre Prison, Acre, Mandatory Palestine
- Cause of death: Execution by hanging
- Buried: Safed Old Jewish Cemetery
- Allegiance: Irgun
- Conflicts: World War II; Jewish insurgency in Mandatory Palestine (executed)

Dov Béla Gruner (Hebrew: דב בלה גרונר; December 6, 1912 – April 16, 1947) was a Hungarian-born Zionist activist in Mandatory Palestine and a member of the pre-state Jewish underground Irgun. On April 16, 1947, Gruner was executed by the British Mandatory authorities in Palestine on charges of "firing on policemen and setting explosive charges with the intent of killing personnel on His Majesty's service." He is honored as one of the Olei Hagardom, the twelve Jewish pre-independence fighters who were executed by British and Egyptian authorities.

== Biography ==
Gruner was born on December 6, 1912, to a religious Jewish family in Kisvárda, Hungary. In 1938, after studying engineering in Brno, he joined the Zionist youth movement Betar, which arranged his passage to Palestine in 1940 aboard the immigrant ship S.S. Skaria. After spending six months in the Atlit detainee camp, he settled in Rosh Pina. In 1941, he joined the British Army to fight the Nazis, and together with his comrades in the Jewish Brigade came to the aid of Holocaust survivors in Europe.

== Irgun activities ==
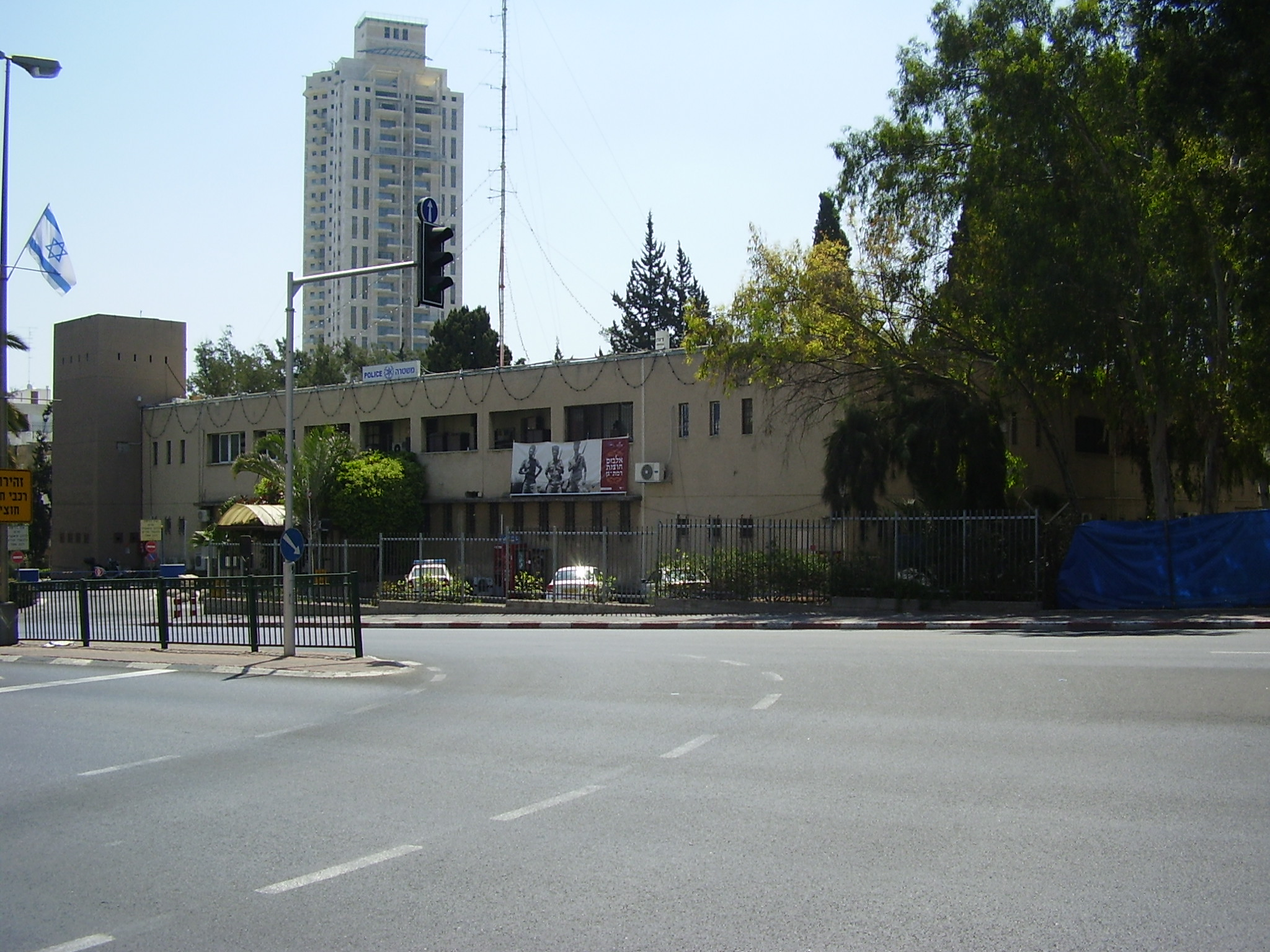
The Ramat Gan Police station

After Gruner's demobilization from the army, in March 1946, he took part in an Irgun arms raid against a British army depot near Netanya. Ten days later, he participated in his second and final operation on behalf of the Irgun—an arms raid against a Ramat Gan police station. Gruner headed a team of "porters", who took weapons from the armory to a waiting truck. When a gunfight in which two Irgun men and an Arab constable were killed broke out, Gruner and his team continued working under fire. Gruner was hit and wounded during the firefight. The remaining Irgun members boarded the truck and escaped together with the weapons.

Gruner, who had been severely wounded by a gunshot to the face, was taken to hospital and operated on. His health slowly began to improve, and he was transferred to prison. On January 1, 1947, his trial before a Jerusalem military court began. When brought before the court and asked whether he admitted guilt, he replied that he did not recognize the authority of the court.

"This court has no legal foundation, since it was appointed by a regime without legal foundation. You came to Palestine because of the commitment you undertook at the behest of all the nations of the world to rectify the greatest wrong caused to any nation in the history of mankind, namely the expulsion of Israel from their land, which transformed them into victims of persecution and incessant slaughter throughout the world. It was this commitment—and this commitment alone—which constituted the legal and moral basis for your presence in this country. But you betrayed it wilfully, brutally and with satanic cunning. You turned your commitment into a mere scrap of paper...When the prevailing government in any country is not legal, when it becomes a regime of oppression and tyranny, it is the right of its citizens—more than that, it is their duty—to fight this regime and to topple it. This is what Jewish youth are doing and will continue to do until you quit this land, and hand it over to its rightful owners: the Jewish people. For you should know this: there is no power in the world which can sever the tie between the Jewish people and their one and only land. Whosoever tries to sever it—his hand will be cut off and the curse of God will rest on him for ever."

== Trial and execution ==
Refusing to partake in his own defense and refusing to co-operate with counsel, Gruner was said to have been offered a commutation on the condition that he admit guilt. He refused to do so and was sentenced to death.

Despite the maximum security of his prison situation, Gruner maintained an irregular correspondence with Irgun headquarters. Among the correspondence between Gruner and headquarters were: His refusal of Irgun assistance with legal counsel (owing to his principled stand regarding non-cooperation with the British court system in Eretz Yisrael), his query whether he should commit suicide in order to make a political statement (the Irgun leadership quickly responded against the initiative) and his final letter, written shortly before he was hanged. Addressed to the Commander in Chief of the Irgun, Menachem Begin, it read:

Sir,

From the bottom of my heart I thank you for the encouragement which you have given me during these fateful days. Be assured that whatever happens I shall not forget the principles of pride, generosity and firmness. I shall know how to uphold my honour, the honour of a Jewish soldier and fighter.

I could have written in high-sounding phrases something like the old Roman "Dulce est pro patria mori", but words are cheap, and sceptics can say 'After all, he had no choice'. And they might even be right. Of course I want to live: who does not? But what pains me, now that the end is so near, is mainly the awareness that I have not succeeded in achieving enough. I too could have said: 'Let the future take care of the future' and meanwhile enjoyed life and be contented with the job I was promised on my demobilization. I could even have left the country altogether for a safer life in America, but this would not have satisfied me either as a Jew or as a Zionist.

There are many schools of thought as to how a Jew should choose his way of life. One way is that of the assimilationists who have renounced their Jewishness. There is also another way, the way of those who call themselves 'Zionists' - the way of negotiation and compromise, as if the existence of a nation were nothing but another transaction. They are not prepared to make any sacrifice, and therefore they have to make concessions and accept compromises.

Perhaps this is indeed a means of delaying the end but, in the final analysis, it leads to the ghetto. And let us not forget this: in the ghetto of Warsaw alone, too, there were five hundred thousand Jews.

The only way that seems, to my mind, to be right, is the way of the Irgun Zvai Leumi, the way of courage and daring without renouncing a single inch of our homeland. When political negotiations prove futile, one must be prepared to fight for our homeland and our freedom. Without them the very existence of our nation is jeopardized, so fight we must with all possible means. This is the only way left to our people in their hour of decision: to stand on our rights, to be ready to fight, even if for some of us this way leads to the gallows. For it is a law of history that only with blood shall a country be redeemed.

I am writing this while awaiting the hangman. This is not a moment at which I can lie, and I swear that if I had to begin my life anew I would have chosen the exact same path, regardless of the consequences for myself.

Your faithful soldier, Dov.

Claims that Gruner was a prisoner of war and was thus entitled to special rights were rejected by General Evelyn Barker, the commander of the British forces in Palestine. In an interview decades later, Barker said Gruner was a murderer and a terrorist, rejecting the notion that the Jewish insurgency in Mandatory Palestine constituted a war.

"It's nonsense to say that he was a prisoner of war. There was no war."

Gruner was hanged at Acre Prison on April 16, 1947, at the age of 35. Executed with him were his Irgun colleagues Mordechai Alkahi, Yehiel Dresner, and Eliezer Kashani. Barker had signed off on all of the death sentences shortly before leaving. In retaliation for the executions, Irgun insurgents repeatedly tried to assassinate Barker. However, all of the attempts failed. Barker lived to the age of 89 and died in 1983. In 1977, after learning that one of his failed killers was Minister of Defence and future President Ezer Weizman, Barker commented: "I expect he's glad that he failed in his mission. What good would it have done to kill me? It wouldn't have helped the Jewish cause or the Irgun or anyone else. At least General Weizman has been able to go through the last thirty years without a murder on his conscience."

== Commemoration ==
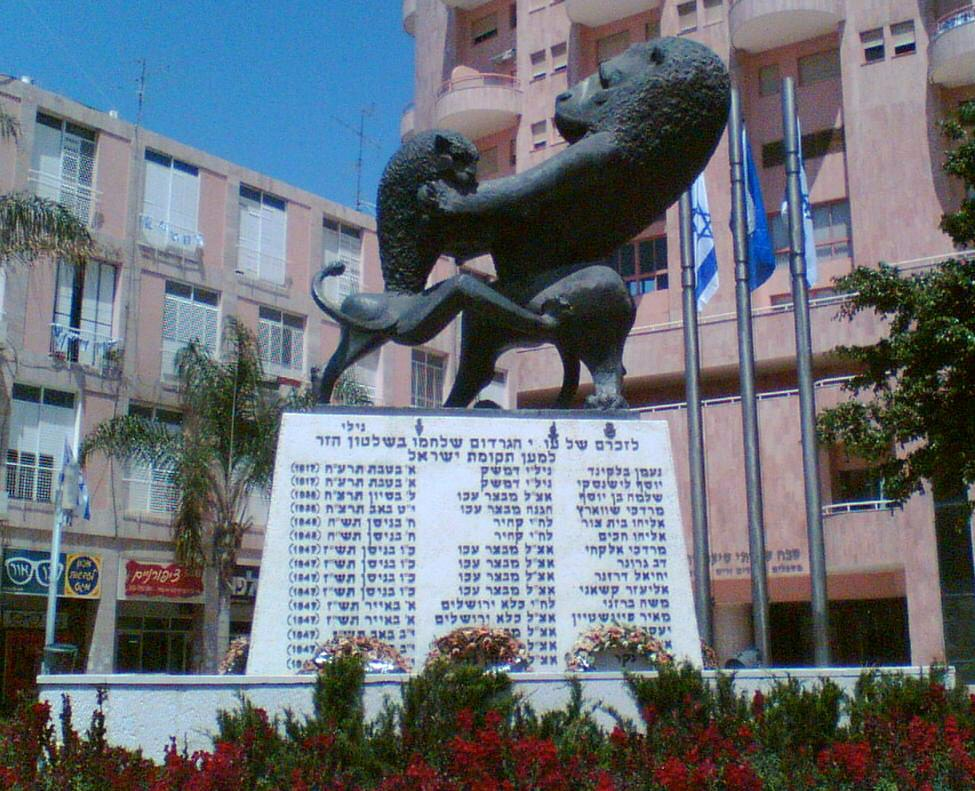
Monument commemorating the Olei Hagardom, Ramat Gan

Moshav Misgav Dov, founded in 1950, is named after Grüner. Several streets in Israel, including one in the Armon HaNetziv neighborhood of Jerusalem, also bear his name. In 1954 the plaza in front of the Ramat Gan Police station was renamed "Gruner Square". A monument commemorating Grüner and the three other Irgun members killed in the attack on the station was constructed at the site. The monument features a sculpture by Chana Orloff, depicting a young lion cub, representing the Yishuv, fighting a mature lion symbolizing the British Empire. The monument also bears a plaque commemorates all Olei Hagardom, Jewish pre-independence fighters executed by Ottoman and British authorities.

At the time of his hanging, a nephew was born to Gruner's brother, who was named Dov in his honor. In 1967, during the Six-Day War, this nephew, Sergeant Dov Gruner of the IDF Paratroopers Brigade, became the first Israeli soldier to reach the Western Wall.

Football club Beitar Dov Netanya (originally Beitar Dov Vatikim Netanya) was named after Gruner, after relocating from Beit Lid. The club remained active until 1979.

== Books ==
- Gitlen, Jan (1962). The Conquest of Acre Fortress, Hadar Pub., Israel.
- Gurion, Itzhak (1950). Triumph on the Gallows, Futuro Press, New York.
