= The Revolt =

Book by Menachem Begin

- First US edition
- Author: Menachem Begin
- Original title: המרד
- Translator: Samuel Katz
- Language: Hebrew
- Subject: Irgun Zvai Leumi
- Published: W. H. Allen (UK); Henry Schuman (US)
- Publication date: 1951

The Revolt (Hebrew: המרד), also published as Revolt, The Revolt: Inside Story of the Irgun and The Revolt: the Dramatic Inside Story of the Irgun, is a book about the militant Zionist organization Irgun Zvai Leumi, by one of its principal leaders, Menachem Begin.

== History ==
The book traces the development of the Irgun from its early days in the 1930s, through its years of violent struggle in the Palestine Mandate against both British rule (the "revolt" of the title) and Arab opposition, to the outbreak of the 1948 Arab–Israeli War. The book is also part autobiographical, tracing Begin's own political development.

Originally published in Hebrew in 1951, an English translation by Samuel Katz was published that same year by W. H. Allen in the UK and Henry Schuman in the US. The book has gone through many editions and reprints, with the latest edition published in 2002.

The political scientist John Bowyer Bell, who studied both the Irgun and the Irish Republican Army (IRA), recalled that many of the IRA men whom he interviewed in the 1960s had read The Revolt and admired it as a manual of guerrilla warfare. It was also studied by African National Congress Nelson Mandela after he went underground in 1960, and credited it as being among the books he used a guide in planning the ANC's guerrilla campaign against the apartheid government of South Africa. A copy of the book was additionally found in an al-Qaeda training base in 2001 during the War in Afghanistan.
