= Yehiel Dresner =

Polish-born Palestinian Irgun member

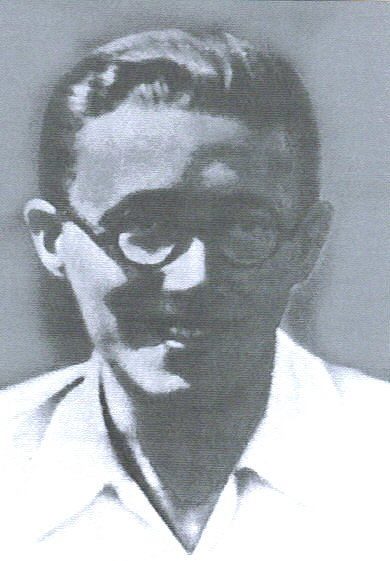
- Born: October 13, 1922; Lwow, Second Polish Republic
- Died: April 16, 1947 (aged 24); Acre Prison, Acre, Mandatory Palestine
- Cause of death: Execution by hanging
- Organization: Irgun

Yehiel Dov Dresner (Hebrew: יחיאל דב דרזנר; October 13, 1922 – April 16, 1947) was an Irgun member in pre-state Mandatory Palestine and one of 12 Olei Hagardom.

== Early life ==
Dresner was born in Lwow, Poland (modern Lviv, Ukraine) to a Jewish family, one of four sons; his mother was from a distinguished rabbinical family. In his youth, he participated in Zionist activities, and when he was 11, his family moved to Palestine and settled in Jerusalem, where he joined the Betar youth movement. Dresner was 15 when Shlomo Ben-Yosef was hanged: the incident had a powerful effect and instilled in him an urge for vengeance against the British.

Due to his family's difficult financial situation, Dresner dropped out of high school and began working. At age 18, he left the family home and moved to Netanya and worked in the diamond industry.

== The underground ==
In Netanya, Dresner joined the Irgun underground movement. His three brothers also joined. He volunteered as a guide for the Betar youth squads. In 1942, he moved to Tel Aviv, where he worked in a factory and joined a group of Jewish nationalists who aimed to combat the use of foreign languages by trying to stop kiosks from selling non-Hebrew newspapers. At one point, he was arrested by the British authorities, but was acquitted at his trial after the Irgun pressured witnesses against testifying. Soon afterwards, Dresner began working extensively with the Irgun, and the Irgun declared an insurrection against British rule.

Initially, Dresner worked in the Irgun's propaganda department, but after a period of time, he was transferred to its intelligence service. In 1944, his brother Tzvi, a senior commander in the Irgun, was arrested five days after his wedding and interned in Africa, and, along with most of the other Jewish underground internees in African detention camps, would only be released in June 1948. After learning that the police planned to arrest him too, Dresner left his home and job and adopted the false identity of Dov Rosenbaum. He initially went into hiding in Tel Aviv before moving to Zikhron Ya'akov and finding work as a guard in the vineyards and eventually came to command a military training course at a secret Irgun training camp between Zikhron Ya'akov and Binyamina. He then moved to Hadera and was placed in charge of the local Irgun branch while hiding from the British and the Haganah, which was then carrying out the Hunting Season. After escaping a Haganah abduction attempt, he returned to Tel Aviv, where he served in command positions.

In July 1945, Dresner took part in an Irgun operation to blow up the Yibne railway bridge, and in November 1945, he participated in the Night of the Trains, a joint operation between the Irgun, Lehi, and Palmach (the elite strike force of the Haganah, which had since switched sides). Dresner was part of an Irgun unit that attacked the Lydda railway station, during which several locomotives and a number of buildings were blown up, and in which an Irgun fighter, two British security personnel, and two Arab civilians were killed.

Dresner went on to serve as a senior Irgun commander in Ramat Gan and Petah Tikva. He personally participated in a February 1946 raid against the RAF airbase at Lydda in which several British military aircraft were destroyed, and an April 1946 arms raid against a Ramat Gan police station which saw a large amount of arms and munitions seized. During that raid, an Arab constable and two Irgun fighters were killed, and one, Dov Gruner, who was later hanged alongside Dresner, was wounded and captured. Dresner was also involved in railway sabotage operations, planting mines on railway tracks to derail trains.

On December 29, 1946, Dresner participated in the Night of the Beatings, an Irgun operation in which British soldiers were abducted and whipped in retaliation of the whipping of an imprisoned Irgun member. The car he and his teammates were traveling in ran into a British roadblock. In the ensuing exchange of fire, one Irgun man, Avraham Mizrahi, was killed and the remaining four taken prisoner.

== Captivity, trial, and execution ==
Following their captivity, Dresner and his surviving teammates were initially imprisoned together in a paratrooper's camp, where, according to a report Dresner later smuggled out of prison through scraps of paper to Irgun commander Menachem Begin, they were repeatedly subjected to severe beatings and humiliations by their captors. After five days, they were transferred to the Jerusalem Central Prison, where they joined Dov Gruner, who was already under sentence of death.

On February 10, 1947, they were tried before a British military court, and convicted of illegally possessing weapons. During the trial, they refused to participate in the proceedings and denied the authority of the court to try them. Dresner, Mordechai Alkahi, and Eliezer Kashani were sentenced to death, while Haim Golevsky, who was 17 and thus too young to be hanged under the law, was sentenced to life imprisonment. On February 13, in his last official act before departing Palestine, General Evelyn Barker, the commander of British forces in Palestine, confirmed the sentences.

Public figures and institutions in the Yishuv appealed for the sentences to be commuted, and a petition pleading for clemency was signed by hundreds of residents of Petah Tikva. Hearing of this, the prisoners themselves sent a letter rebuking the petitioners for compromising their own honor and stating their willingness to die. Dresner, Alkahi, and Kashani also refused to sign an appeal for clemency, as Gruner had done before them.

On April 14, the four men were transferred to Acre Prison and placed in the condemned cells.

In the early morning hours of April 16, all four were hanged in Acre Prison. Each man sang Hatikvah on his way to the gallows, and was joined by the other Jewish prisoners. The executions were carried out in great secrecy, and without the presence of a rabbi.

== Aftermath ==
The bodies of Dresner, Alkahi, Kashani, and Gruner were taken to Safed in a British armored convoy and buried them there. The British authorities had refused a request by them to be buried in Rosh Pinna, near Shlomo Ben-Yosef's grave, and for months, guarded the graves to prevent the Irgun from stealing the bodies to carry out their final wish. Neither the chevra kadisha or the families had been informed of the burials. Despite a curfew being imposed, hundreds of Jews defied the authorities and marched to the cemetery. The executions earned the British worldwide scorn.

Dresner had maintained his Dov Rosenbaum persona from the time he first assumed that identity, and was thus buried under that pseudonym. His true identity would not become known until after the British departed Palestine and the state of Israel was established.

Yehiel Dresner is considered a national hero in Israel today, and streets have been named for him.
