= Eliezer Kashani =

Irgun Member, one of Olei Hagardom

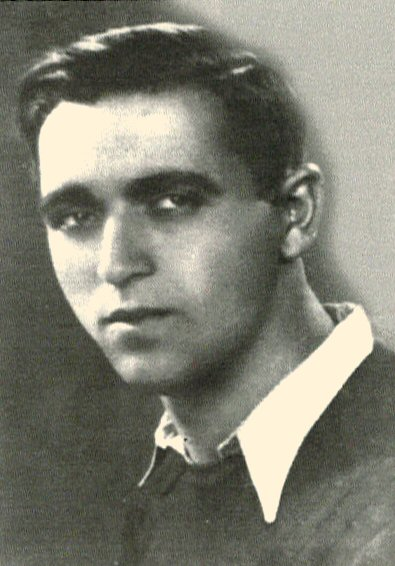
- Native name: אליעזר קשאני
- Born: March 13, 1923; Petah Tikva, Mandatory Palestine
- Died: April 16, 1947 (aged 24) Acre Prison, Acre, Mandatory Palestine
- Cause of death: Execution by hanging
- Allegiance: Irgun
- Conflicts: Jewish insurgency in Mandatory Palestine: Night of the Beatings (executed)

Eliezer Kashani (Hebrew: אליעזר קשאני; March 13, 1923 – April 16, 1947) was an Irgun member in Mandatory Palestine and one of the 12 Olei Hagardom.

== Early life ==
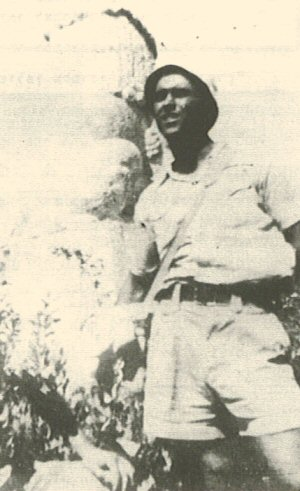
Kashani at Tel Hai

Kashani was born in Petah Tikva to an impoverished Persian-Jewish family with 4 brothers and 3 sisters. In his youth he was a part of the Maccabi movement, and he worked in a factory at age 13.

On August 23, 1944, Kashani was arrested by the British on suspicions of belonging to the Irgun and sent to Latrun. He was eventually relocated to Eritrea alongside 250 other Jewish prisoners. While in Africa, Kashani insisted on joining the Underground, although at first they would not accept him for being in detention. While in Eritrea, he learned English fluently. When he returned to Palestine, he became a prominent fighter for the Irgun Zvai Leumi, despite the risk of being reported to the British police for being a suspect.

== Activity in the Underground ==
In the Underground he dealt with intelligence, weapons, and military operations. He even began a course to become a commander, however he died before he could finish. On December 29, 1946, Kashani and four other Irgun fighters, Mordechai Alkahi, Yehiel Dresner, Haim Gilad and Avraham Mizrahi, set out for action on what would be known as the Night of the Beatings. At the Tayyasim Junction, the five of them encountered a police roadblock from which they opened fire. The driver, Mizrahi, died of his wounds. Eliezer and the three remaining fighters were caught and transferred to a nearby military camp, where they went through a series of torture. For 20 hours straight they were beaten. After five days in which they were humiliated and beaten, the fighters were transferred to Jerusalem.

== Trial and execution ==
On February 10, 1947, the four military trials were held. Alkahi, Kashani, Dresner, and Gilad wore khaki trousers and socks, black shoes, a grey coat, and blue-white skullcaps. The four denied the court's authority to try them and refused to respond to questions or accusations. After a short trial, the judges announced that the four were found guilty of carrying weapons. The punishment for Alkahi, Dresner and Kashani was death, while Gilad, 17, was sentenced to life in prison. Just as the verdict was heard, the four rose up and sung Hatikvah.

There was hope in the Yishuv to rescue the three, who were not accused of bloodshed, but for holding weapons. In the Jerusalem prison, Kashani was sick, but refused to seek medical treatment as long as he was shackled in his cell. His family's pleas for a pardon were also rejected. His lawyer, who also handled his return from Eritrea, pleaded with him to sign a plea for clemency, however Kashani said he did not recognize English rule and therefore would not sign any paper.

On April 15, the four convicts were secretly transferred from Jerusalem to the Acre Prison. The next day, April 16th, 1947, at 4 AM, the four were brought to the gallows without prior warning, and without notifying their families. At the same time, the authorities hinted that their execution was not imminent, and several hours earlier, attorney Max Seligman, who handled their pardons was informed that there were no preparations yet for the executions. They sung Hatikvah as they were brought to the gallows. Kashani was the last of the four to be hanged.

The bodies of the four men were led by a convoy of tanks and armored cars to the city of Safed, without informing the Chevra kadisha or their family members, and they were placed half naked in the Mount Canaan police station. Their last request, to be buried in Rosh Pinna, was not honored. At seven in the morning, the radio announced the executions, and a curfew was imposed in Palestine. In the morning, the people of Safed asked to take part in the cemetery, but this city too was under curfew. Nevertheless, hundreds of Jews arrived in the pouring rain to the cemetery, where the Jews of the gallows were buried next to the victims of the 1929 and 1936 riots. There was a great shock in the Yishuv over the hangings, and condemnation was voiced by many Jewish communities across the world. Some American priests even organized memorial assemblies.

Months later, British guards were still placed at the graves in Safed so that the Irgun fighters would not remove the bodies and relocate them to Rosh Pinna, as they had requested.

== Legacy ==
Streets were named after Kashani in several Israeli cities, including Tel Aviv, Beersheba, Jaffa and Jerusalem.
