= Acre Prison =

Former prison and current museum in Acre, Israel

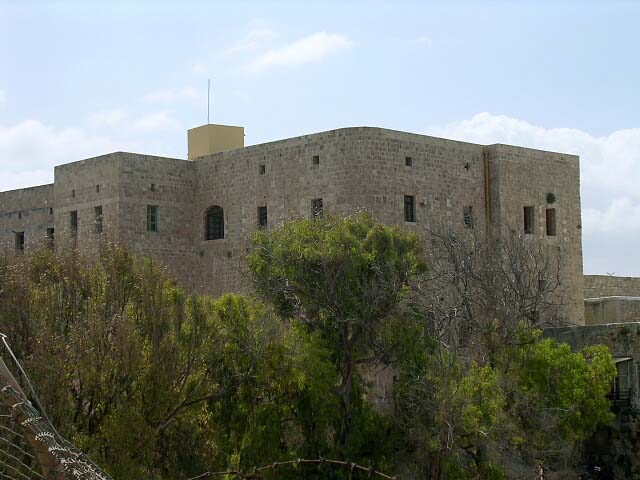
- Acre Prison, May 2004
- Interactive map of Acre Prison
- Location: Acre, Israel; 32°55′25″N 35°04′09″E
- Website: museums.mod.gov.il/sites/Aco/Pages/default.aspx

Acre Prison (Arabic: سجن عكا; Hebrew: כלא עכו), also known as Akko Prison, is a former prison and current museum in Acre, Israel.

== History ==
The citadel in the old city was built during the Ottoman period over the ruins of a 12th-century Crusader fortress. The Ottoman Empire used it at various times as a government building, prison, army barracks, and weapon warehouse.

During the British Mandate it was used as a prison, and many Palestinians were imprisoned as criminals or for participating in illegal protests. On June 17, 1930, Fuad Hijazi, ‘Ata Al-Zeer, and Mohammad Khaleel Jamjoum who participated in the 1929 Palestine riots were executed by hanging at the prison by the British authorities. Palestinian poet and Nuh Ibrahim wrote a piece about the hanging, titled From Acre With Love. At the time, Ibrahim himself was also detained in the prison.

Many were imprisoned during the 1936–1939 Arab revolt in Palestine, and 108 Palestinian prisoners were executed for their involvement in the revolt.

On April 16, 1947, Dov Gruner and the three men (Yechiel Dresner, Mordechai Alkahi and Eliezer Kashani) captured by the British 6th Airborne Division were hanged in Acre Prison, becoming the first post-war "martyrs" of the Irgun. Dov Gruner in a broadcast declared the British Army and Administration to be "criminal organizations". Two weeks later, on May 4, the Irgun attacked the prison, blowing a hole in the wall. This allowed 27 Irgun prisoners and 214 Arab prisoners to escape. This event would come to be known as the Acre Prison break. Three Irgun men who took part in the attack (Avshalom Haviv, Meir Nakar, and Yaakov Weiss) were captured during the attack, imprisoned, and executed there. The prison also contained Jewish prisoners, members of the Haganah, Lehi, and Irgun. One of those prisoners was Eitan Livni (father of Tzipi Livni), the Irgun operations officer. In total, the prison contained 700 Arab prisoners and 90 Jewish prisoners.

A room in the prison was occupied for some months by Bahá'u'lláh, the founder of the Baháʼí Faith, and members of his family, who were exiled to Ottoman Syria in 1868. The cell is now a site of pilgrimage for Baháʼís making a wider pilgrimage to the Baháʼí shrines in Haifa and Bahji, outside Akko.

== See also ==
- Exodus (1960 film), directed by Otto Preminger, based on Leon Uris' novel Exodus
- List of prisons in Israel
- Olei Hagardom
- Ze’ev Jabotinsky
