= Moscovia Detention Centre =

Israeli detention and interrogation facility

- Location in Jerusalem Moscovia Detention Centre (Israel)
- Location: West Jerusalem, Israel; 31°46′55″N 35°13′26″E

The Al-Moskobiya, Moscobiyeh, Muscovite or Moscovia Detention Centre is an Israeli detention and interrogation facility and prison in the Russian Compound of West Jerusalem. The center is used to interrogate Palestinian detainees and prisoners from a variety of age groups, including children. It has been described by activists and human rights organizations as being notorious for underground dungeon cells and harsh methods of torture.

== History ==
During the British Palestine Mandate the center was known as 'the central prison'. It has been claimed by Addameer, a Palestinian NGO, that the prison especially became notorious due to its harsh torture techniques throughout the 1980s.

In 1990, it was reported that the jail was used mainly for Palestinians fighting Israeli occupation of the West Bank and Gaza Strip. Both the Moscovia Detention Centre and the nearby Museum of Underground Prisoners are yellow brick buildings that were built as part of a complex of hostels and a green-domed church for pilgrims by the Russian Orthodox Church in the 1860s.

== Popular culture ==
In 2017 a documentary by director Raed Andoni was released called Ghost Hunting (Arabic: إصطياد اشباح Iṣṭiyād ʾAšbāḥ). The movie, which explores the trauma of former prisoners of the Detention Center, was first screened in Ramallah for an audience consisting for ninety percent of former prisoners.
