= Meir Feinstein =

Israeli militant

- מאיר פיינשטיין
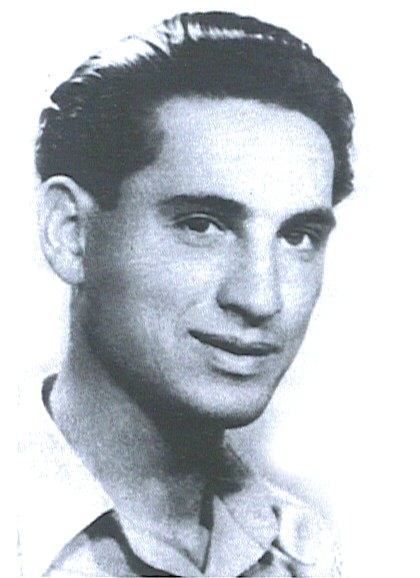
- Born: October 5, 1927; Old City, Jerusalem, Mandatory Palestine
- Died: April 21, 1947 (aged 19); Russian Compound, Jerusalem, Mandatory Palestine
- Burial place: Jerusalem, Israel (Mount of Olives)
- Military career
- Allegiance: Haganah; Irgun
- Conflicts: World War II; Jewish insurgency in Mandatory Palestine †

Meir Feinstein (Hebrew: מאיר פיינשטיין; October 5, 1927 – April 21, 1947) was an Irgun member in Mandatory Palestine, during the Jewish insurgency in Mandatory Palestine. Feinstein, who was sentenced to death by the British authorities, is remembered for his suicide together with Moshe Barazani, a member of the group Lehi, under sentence of death; the two killed themselves embracing each other with a live grenade lodged between them hours before their scheduled hangings. He is memorialized in Israel today as one of 12 Olei Hagardom.

== Early life ==
Meir Feinstein was born in the Old City of Jerusalem. His parents, Bela and Eliezer, immigrated from Brisk. As a boy, he received a religious education; he studied at the Etz Chaim Yeshiva for ten years, and was a disciple of Aryeh Levin. During his childhood, his father died, and he had to work to help support the family. He worked in a series of jobs in Jerusalem, in Ramatayim, and in the kibbutzim of Negba and Givat HaShlosha.

== Haganah and British Army service ==
While at Givat HaShlosha, Feinstein joined the Haganah. During his military training, Feinstein, an aspiring writer, educated himself in secular subjects with books sent to him by his brother from Jerusalem.

In 1944, during World War II, after rumors of the Holocaust began spreading, Feinstein enlisted in the British Army. Although only 16 at the time, he enlisted using a forged birth certificate claiming he was 20. Feinstein was accepted and served for two and a half years in the Royal Engineers, during which he was stationed in Palestine, Alexandria, and Beirut. He was discharged from the British Army in August 1946.

== Irgun activities ==
While still in the British Army, Feinstein had met other Irgun members and began helping them smuggle weapons stolen from British military camps to Mandatory Palestine for Irgun use. Following his discharge, he joined the Irgun's Jerusalem branch. He initially worked in the Irgun's propaganda section, but was eventually promoted to join the Combat Corps.

On October 30, 1946, Feinstein participated in a raid on the Jerusalem railway station. The attack was one of a series of sabotage operations the Irgun carried out against the railways that day, as part of the Irgun's overall efforts to paralyze the British Mandatory government. The British had advance intelligence of the plan, and the operation was further compromised when the Irgun, not wanting to harm civilians in the station, published an advance warning. On the day of the raid, the British were waiting in ambush at the station. The Irgun raiders arrived in two taxis, and Feinstein drove the one carrying the bombs which were to be used - three suitcases filled with explosives. The team then rushed into the station, laid the three suitcase bombs, and put up a sign warning of mines. However, they came under British fire, and four of the attackers were hit, including Feinstein, whose left arm was shattered. Feinstein and some teammates rushed back to his taxi, and managed to escape. Despite his injury, Feinstein managed to drive the taxi, under a hail of British gunfire, away from the station using only one arm. After their escape, the British attempted to remove the suitcase bombs they had abandoned. When a police sapper tried to lift one of the bombs, it exploded, killing him and devastating the interior of the station.

=== Capture and amputation ===
After escaping, Feinstein drove the taxi to Jerusalem's Yemin Moshe quarter, where the team then scattered, hoping to slip away. Feinstein's arm, however, continued bleeding heavily, and he left a trail of blood behind him. Shortly afterward, the police discovered the abandoned taxi, riddled by bullets and with blood-soaked seats, in the Yemin Moshe quarter. Feinstein was arrested when they followed the trail of blood from the taxi to Feinstein. He was taken to hospital, where his shattered left arm was amputated.

== Trial and public support ==
Feinstein's trial in a Jerusalem military court opened on March 25, 1947. He did not participate in the proceedings, refused legal counsel, and refused to recognize the authority of the British court to try him, other than to speak at the summation. Before the reading of the verdict, Feinstein gave a defiant speech against British rule, saying:

Officers of the Occupation Army,

A regime of gallows is the regime you wish to establish in this country, which was destined to be a lighthouse for all of humanity, and in your foolish wickedness, you presumed that by this regime you will break our people's spirit, the people to whom this whole country had been a gallows. You were wrong. You will learn that you have encountered steel, steel forged in the fire of love and hatred - love for the homeland and freedom, hatred for enslavement and invader. Burning steel it is. You will not break it. You will burn your hands.

How great is your blindness, British tyrants? Did you not notice who stands against you in this campaign, unexampled in the history of mankind? Shall you scare us with death? We, who have listened for years to the rattling of the wheels of them Railroad cars, who led our brothers, our parents, the best of our nation - to slaughter, which too had no precedent in human history? We, who asked, and ask ourselves everyday: in what are we better than them? From the millions of our brothers? What have we won? For we could have been among them and with them in the days of fear and in the moments of dying.

And to these recurring questions, there is in our conscience but one answer: we remained alive not to live and await in conditions of slavery and oppression, a new Treblinka. We remained alive, to ensure life, freedom and dignity for us, for our nation, for our children and their children for generations to come. We remained alive so that it wouldn't matter anymore that which happened there and might happen under your rule, the rule of treason, the rule of blood.

Therefore we shall not be frightened, for we have learned and by countless of victims for nothing we have learned - that there is life worse than death, and there is death greater than life…

— Meir Feinstein, 1947.

== Death ==
At approximately midnight on 21 or 22 April 1947, a few hours before their scheduled execution by hanging in the Jerusalem Central Prison in the Russian Compound, now the Museum of the Underground Prisoners, could be carried out, he and his friend and fellow prisoner Moshe Barazani blew themselves up in their cells with an improvised grenade which had been smuggled to them in a hollowed-out orange.

A romanticized version of the story, often told in modern Israel says that they detonated the grenade as they stood embracing each other, with the grenade between their hearts.

== Legacy ==
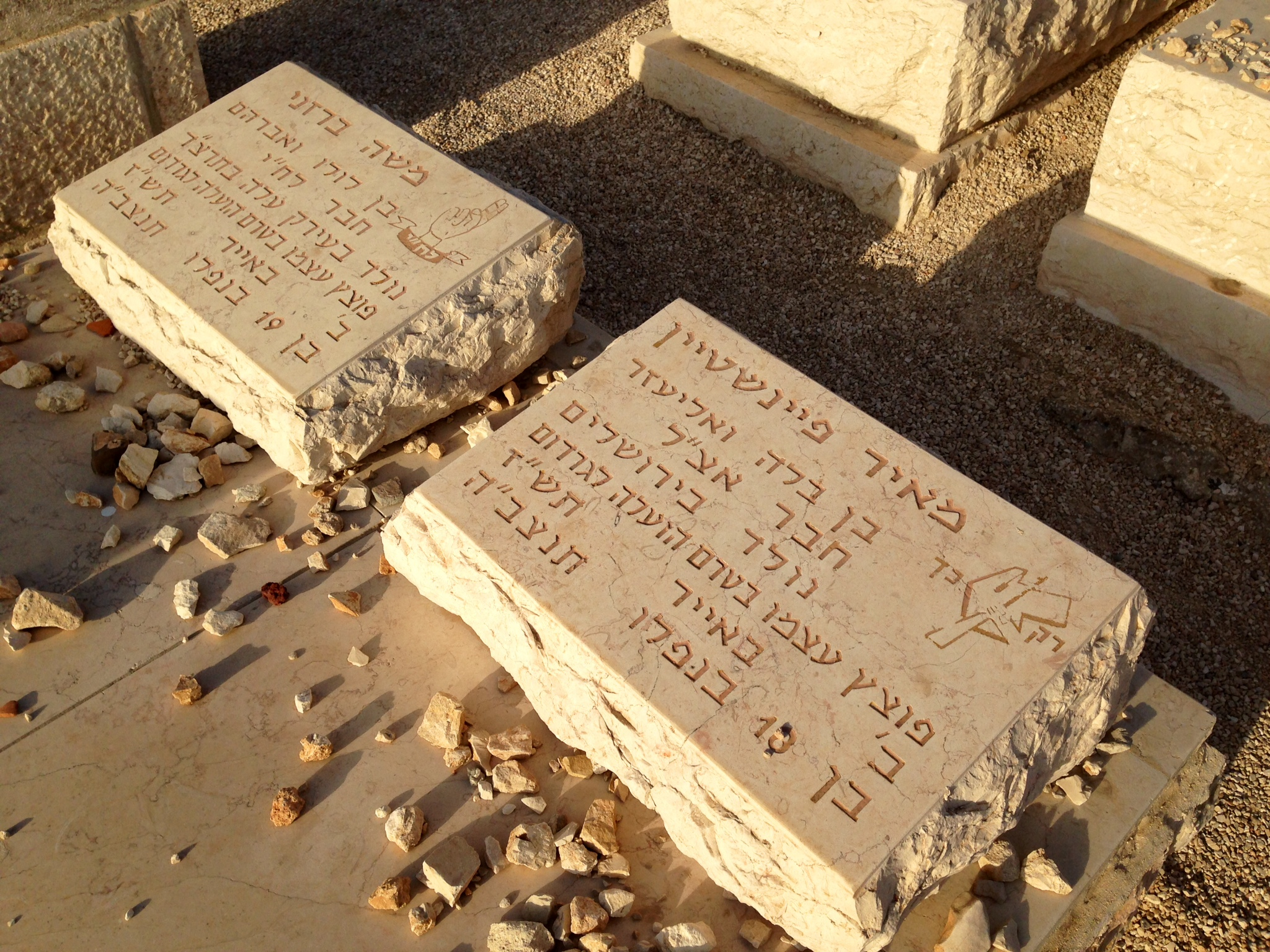
Grave of Moshe Barazani and Meir Feinstein at the Mount of Olives in Jerusalem, Israel.

The story of Feinstein and Barazani became one of the most famous tales in the history of Zionism. Menachem Begin was so moved by the deeds of the two men that he requested in his will that he be buried next to them on the Mount of Olives, which he was.

Just before his death, Feinstein gave to British prison guard Thomas Henry Goodwin, whom he and Barazani had nicknamed "the good jailer", a copy of the Bible, inscribed in Hebrew and English, "In the shadow of the gallows, 21.4.47. To the British soldier as you stand guard. Before we go to the gallows, accept this Bible as a memento and remember that we stood in dignity and marched in dignity. It is better to die with a weapon in your hands than to live with hands raised. Meir Feinstein". He then requested a moment of privacy for prayer, which prevented Goodwin from being able to stop the grenade being detonated (saving Goodwin from being injured by the grenade). In 2007, Goodwin's son Dennis donated the Bible to Feinstein's nephew Eliezer, who received it on behalf of the Museum of Underground Prisoners in Jerusalem at a commemorative state ceremony.

Menachem Begin brought up the story during a speech in 1981:

"Our Mizrahim were courageous fighters – already in the underground. Feinstein was from European origins, What's it called? Ashkenazi. Moshe Barazani was a Sephardic Jew from Iraq. In the night, after they were sentenced to death, they were due to be taken to the gallows in the early morning, the Rabbi insisted that he would come to accompany them and they didn't want to harm the Rabbi. They held close to their hearts a hand grenade – they pulled the trigger... Ashkenazi? Iraqi? Jews! Brothers! Fighters!"
