= Moshe Barzani =

Member of Lehi

- משה ברזני
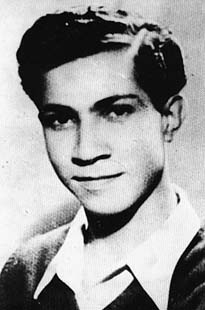
- Born: June 14, 1926; Baghdad, Mandatory Iraq
- Died: April 21, 1947 (aged 20); Russian Compound, Jerusalem, Mandatory Palestine
- Burial place: Mount of Olives, Jerusalem
- Military career
- Allegiance: Lehi

Moshe Barzani (Hebrew: משה ברזני; June 14, 1926 – April 21, 1947) was an Iraqi-born Kurdish Jew and a member of Lehi ("Freedom Fighters of Israel," aka the "Stern Gang") underground movement in pre-state Mandate Palestine during the Jewish insurgency in Palestine. He is most notable for having died by suicide with a hand grenade together with Meir Feinstein, another Jewish underground fighter under sentence of death, shortly before their scheduled executions, and is memorialized in Israel today as one of the Olei Hagardom.

== Early life ==
Barzani was born in Baghdad to a Kurdish Jewish family from Barzan. The family moved to Jerusalem during the Aliyah when he was six. At an early age, he began working, initially as a carpenter's apprentice, and then in a soft drinks factory.

== Underground activity ==
Barzani joined Lehi at an early age, following in the footsteps of his brother. Initially, he was a member of Lehi's youth division and posted propaganda leaflets, but later joined the fighting force. He participated in numerous sabotage operations, laying mines to destroy British vehicles and taking part in railway sabotage.

On March 9, 1947, Barzani was sent on a mission to assassinate a senior British officer, Brigadier A.P. Davies, with a grenade. He was stopped and searched by a British patrol which found him near the Schneller Camp, a British installation in Jerusalem. A grenade was found in his pocket, and he was arrested. On March 17, 1947, he was tried before a military court on charges of illegal weapons possession and conspiracy to murder, convicted, and sentenced to death.

== Suicide ==
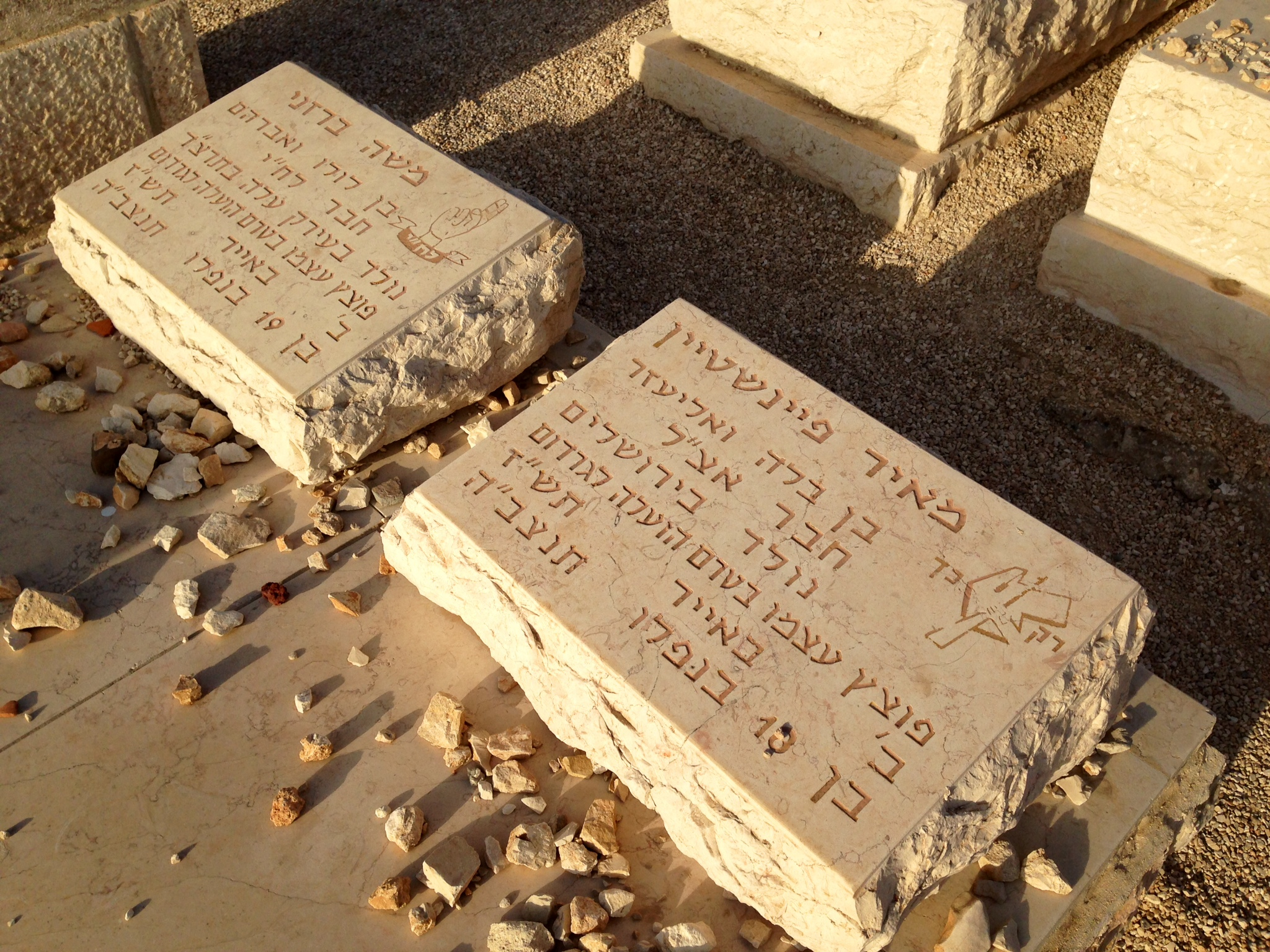
Grave of Moshe Barzani and Meir Feinstein at the Mount of Olives in Jerusalem, Israel.

While awaiting execution in the Central Prison in Jerusalem's Russian Compound, he met Irgun fighter Meir Feinstein, who had also been sentenced to death. On April 21, 1947, shortly before their scheduled executions, they died by suicide with an improvised grenade which had been smuggled inside a hollowed-out orange. The two embraced each other with the live grenade lodged between them. The story of Feinstein and Barzani became a celebrated tale in Zionism. Menachem Begin, leader of Irgun and later prime minister of Israel, was buried next to them on the Mount of Olives in accordance with his will. To commemorate the 60th anniversary of Barazani's death, a state ceremony was held at the Museum of the Underground Prisoners in Jerusalem in 2007.

== His story in modern Israel ==
Benjamin Netanyahu told their story in a 2010 speech, "Which of us does not remember the almost unbelievable story of Moshe Barzani and Meir Feinstein? Grenades were smuggled to their prison cells in a basket of oranges. Their original plan was to blow themselves up together as they were being hung. However, it then became clear to them that one of the rabbis of the Jewish community intended to be there as they were executed. In order not to endanger him, the two decided that after his visit, they would take their fate into their own hands. They embraced firmly and exploded the grenades up against their hearts. It is doubtful that anyone could invent such an unbelievable story, a story which expresses supreme heroism, sublime love for country and people. Yes, love of country, love of the homeland, love for their people".
