= Aryeh Levin =

Israeli rabbi (1885–1969)

Rabbi Aryeh Levin אריה לוין
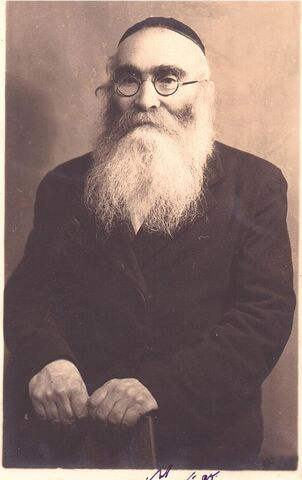

Personal life
- Born: March 22, 1885 Orla
- Died: 28 March 1969 (aged 84) Jerusalem
- Buried: Sanhedria Cemetery

Religious life
- Religion: Judaism

Jewish leader
- Position: Mashgiach
- Yeshiva: Etz Chaim Yeshiva

Aryeh Levin (Hebrew: אריה לוין; Yiddish: אריה לעווין; March 22, 1885 - March 28, 1969) was an Orthodox rabbi dubbed the "Father of Prisoners" for his visits to members of the Jewish underground imprisoned in the Central Prison of Jerusalem in the Russian Compound during the British Mandate. He was also known as the "Tzadik ("saint") of Jerusalem" for his work on behalf of the poor and the sick.

== Biography ==
Aryeh Levin was born near the village of Orla located 47 km (29 mi) south of the regional capital Białystok, Russian Empire (now Poland) to Binyamin Beinish and Ethel Levin. He had two older sisters, Miriam and Faige. He was tutored by local teachers until the age of 12, and then left home to attend the great yeshivas of Slonim, Slutsk, Volozhin and Brisk. In 1905, he emigrated to what was then Ottoman Palestine. Soon after he moved to Jerusalem and married Tzipora Hanna, the daughter of Rabbi David Shapira.

== Father of the Prisoners ==
In 1931, at the request of the British Mandate authorities, Chief Rabbi Abraham Isaac Kook appointed Reb Aryeh Levin the official Jewish Prison Chaplain, a position he informally had filled since 1927. He accepted on the condition that he receive no pay. He would walk from his home in Nachlaot to visit the Jewish prisoners held in the Russian Compound on charges of arms possession or smuggling. Most of the prisoners were members of the Palmach, Haganah, Irgun or Lehi. Levin prayed with the prisoners and conveyed messages to their families. Room 29 in the Central Prison in Jerusalem (now the Museum of the Underground Prisoners), was used as a synagogue on Shabbat and holidays. Mattityahu Shmuelevitz, whose death sentence was commuted to life imprisonment, wrote to a friend: “Yet there is one person in particular to whom I remain grateful first and foremost; a dear, precious Jew about whom you told me nothing; but it was he who stormed heaven and earth for me; and more important — it was he who brought me closer to my Maker in those fateful days... He left and we remained in the prison. He couldn't take us with him out into the free world, but he always brought the outside world in to us.”

"Reb Aryeh's eyes radiated love and comradeship, and he spoke soft and soothing words of encouragement to those imprisoned. Even the most stubborn prisoners succumbed to his simple, untainted love for his fellow man." Levin invested great efforts to avert death sentences and reduce the punishment of those sentenced to life imprisonment. Once he threw himself in front of the High Commissioner's vehicle to get him to hear his appeal.

In 1965, Rabbi Levin was honored at a ceremony organized by veteran underground resistance fighters in honor of his eightieth birthday. It was held in the courtyard of the old central prison in the Russian Compound. Levin stated, “The importance of this assembly is that it has brought friends together. Moreover, this good meeting is taking place on the other side of the prison bars... It particularly makes my heart glad to see the families of the prisoners, especially the little children, since I have always loved small children.” Then he added, “I do not know if I shall be privileged to be with you again like this. All I ask of you is this: Tell your children: There was an old Jew in Jerusalem who loved us so very much!” With that, he burst into tears, and among the thousands of people there, not a dry eye was to be found."

== Visiting the sick ==
Levin was known for his visits to the sick, especially patients who had no family of their own. "It was Reb Aryeh's practice to go to the hospitals of Jerusalem every Friday, to visit the sick who were confined there. First he would always go and speak with the nurses, to find out from them which patients received no visitors as a rule. At the beds of these forgotten souls whom no relatives came to see, he would linger, caressing each one's hand and giving him words of encouragement and cheer." "He would sit for hours near the beds of the sick, especially at Bikur Cholim hospital in Jerusalem."

"He was also a frequent visitor at hospitals for lepers, including a hospital in Bethlehem, where most of the patients were Arabs. Reb Aryeh began this holy practice after he had found a woman weeping bitterly by the Western Wall. Reb Aryeh asked her what made her cry so intensely. She told him that her child had no cure, and was locked up in the leper hospital in Jerusalem. He immediately decided to visit the young child, and when he arrived, all the patients burst into tears. It had been years, since they had the privilege to see any visitor from the outside world."

"His pious wife cooked regularly for them, and he would take the prepared food to the hospital."

== Identification of bodies ==
After the 1947–1949 Palestine war, Rabbi Levin invoked a ritual known as Goral Hagra (ha-gra = Vilna Gaon) to identify the mutilated remains of 12 Jewish fighters of the Convoy of 35. This mystical ceremony involves a Torah scholar opening a Tanach to find a verse that hints to the identity of the subject.

== Character traits ==
Levin was known for his "humility, kindness, and respect for all... He treated everyone he met with love, respect, and dignity." "He saw only the good in human beings, even those for whom others rarely had a kind word." "Reb Aryeh Levin was perpetually involved with deeds of charity and helping the poor." "

Levin's apartment in the Mishkenot Yisrael neighborhood was tiny and sparsely furnished. He explained: "Many times [people] tried to tell me that I should move from my apartment to a more spacious place, and I refused. Observe that after a long life, a man is taken from his apartment to the cemetery. So for me the adjustment will be easier, my room isn't much bigger.”

"Reb Aryeh fulfilled the Talmudic law that 'One must love his wife like himself, and honor and respect her more than himself'." When Levin's wife had a problem with her knee, the doctor asked what's wrong, Levin replied: "Our foot hurts us" (plural). He went to bed past midnight, after counseling couples who came to him. When asked, "Why he did not arrange for couples to come to his house earlier when they need help?" He answered that "most couples with marital problems are worried about their reputations, so they all want to come here (discreetly) in the late hours of the night."

== Model educator ==
In 1925, Rabbi Isser Zalman Meltzer was appointed to head the Etz Chaim Yeshiva and Levin was made the Mashgiach (spiritual advisor). Levin was known for his love and affection to all his students, treating them as adults.

An administrator in the Israeli school system recounted his experience as a child at one of Jerusalem's boarding schools. One day chocolate pudding was served and the boy wolfed it down and got back in line asking for another portion. The server refused with a nasty remark. Frustrated and angered, the boy turned over the entire chocolate pudding pot. The boy was punished and publicly reprimanded by school officials. He was told Reb Aryeh, the spiritual mentor of the institution, would decide whether he should be expelled. Next morning, he met Levin who asked him to sit next to him. He asked him, “Did you spill over the pot as they said that you did?” The child admitted his guilt. “Will you do such a thing again in the future?” Reb Aryeh asked. “No, never again,” said the child. Reb Aryeh asked him then, "Do you really like chocolate pudding?” “Yes,” he answered. Reb Aryeh said, “I too love chocolate pudding. I have here two containers of chocolate pudding, so let us sit down here together and eat chocolate pudding.” At that moment, the educator said he realized what it meant to be a Torah Jew.

== Death ==
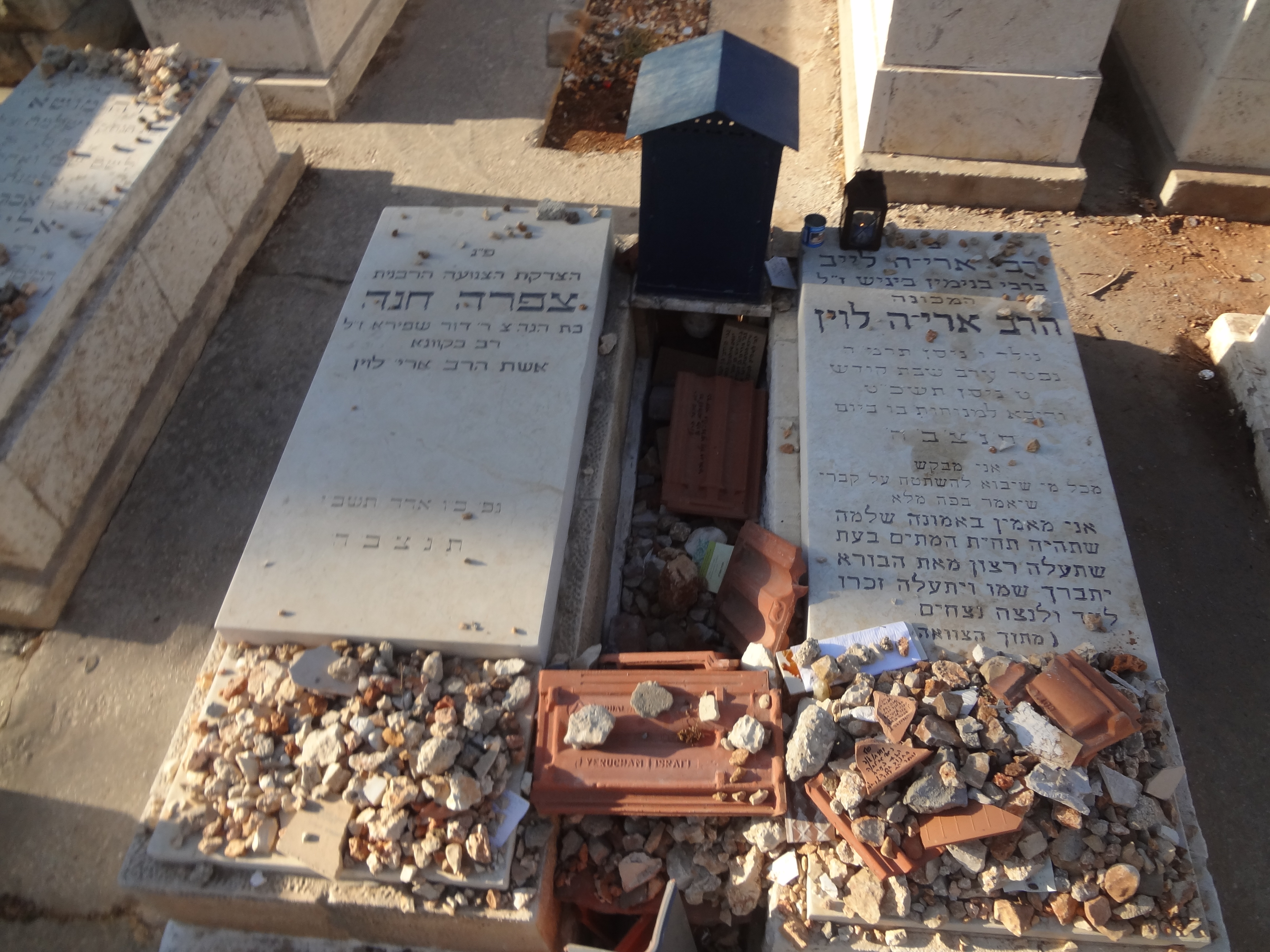
Grave of Aryeh Levin and wife, Tzippora, Sanhedria Cemetery

Levin died six days after his 84th birthday. He and his wife Tzippora are buried in the Sanhedria Cemetery in Jerusalem. Inscribed on his gravestone is the following instruction to visitors: "I ask anyone who comes to my grave to say: 'I firmly believe that there will be a Resurrection of the Dead when the time that the will arises from the Creator, blessed be His name.'"
