= Haim Kadmon =

Israeli official and British Mandate administrator (1897–1985)

- חיים קדמון
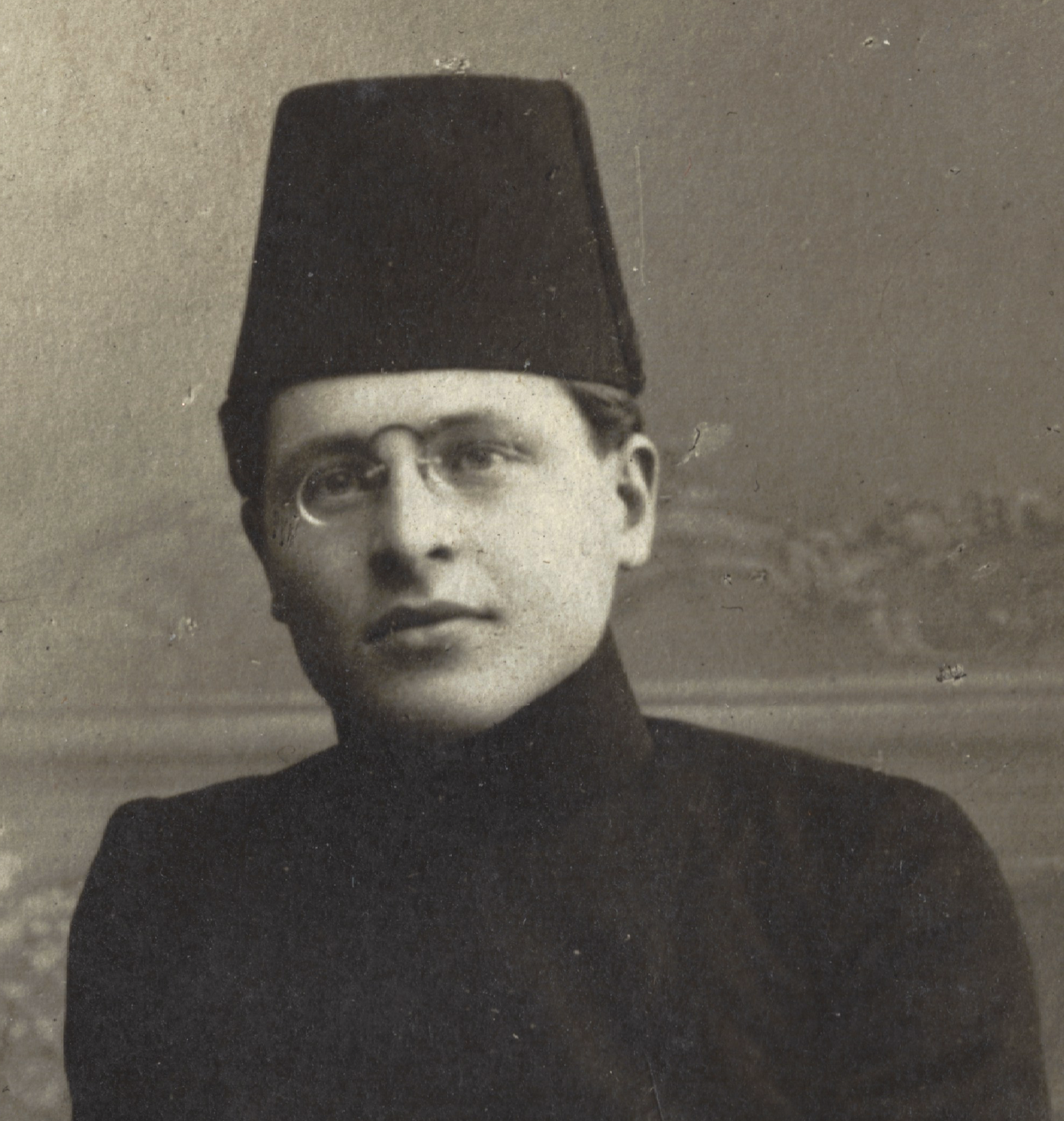
- Kadmon as a student in Russia

Administrator General and Official Receiver of Israel
- In office 1948–1965
- Preceded by: Position established

Personal details
- Born: Haim Kosloff; 1897 Mogilev, Russian Empire
- Died: 1985 (aged 87–88)
- Spouses: Judith (first wife, deceased); Miriam (second wife, m. 1958)
- Occupation: Administrator, civil servant

Haim Kadmon (Hebrew: חיים קדמון; 1897–1985) was a senior official in the British Mandate of Palestine and later in the State of Israel. His career spanned from a senior official role in the British Mandate (1920–1948) to the position of Administrator General and Official Receiver in the Israeli Ministry of Justice (1948–1965). Additionally, he was actively involved in voluntary services, notably with Ort Israel, the Youth Hostel Association, and Magen David Adom.

== Life ==
Haim Kadmon, born Kosloff, was born in 1897 in Mogilev in the Russian Empire (now Belarus). He was one of five children. He studied in a Heder (Orthodox) and then attended a public Jewish school. On graduation he intended to continue to a secondary school in Białystok, but because of numerus clausus requirements he would not have been accepted unless he paid 500.- Rubal. He heard from his Hebrew teacher that in Palestine, in Tel Aviv, existed the Herzlia gymnasium to which he applied to be accepted. He began his studies there in 1913. On returning for holiday to his family in Russia in 1914 he was caught up in the Communistic revolution. As he had to continue his studies there he enrolled in a technical school where he studied administration of regulating train traffic (he heard that the British Mandatory Government in Palestine was planning to develop the regulation of train traffic).

In 1919 he married Judith, an eye doctor, and together they decided to emigrate to Palestine arriving on the famous Ruslan ship. Upon arriving he entered service in the British Mandatory Government. While in service and after the bankruptcy legislation was enacted he was sent to London to study where he received his diploma of certified accountant so that he could be appointed to serve in the office of the Official Receiver. In due course he was appointed to be the deputy.

In 1958 Kadmon married his second wife Miriam. Haim Kadmon died in 1985.

== Career in British Mandate Palestine (1920–1948) ==
Kadmon began his career in the British Mandate's administration, initially involved in regulating train traffic and later in the paymasters office of the police. His expertise in bankruptcy law, acquired through study in London, led to his appointment as Deputy Official Receiver. He played a pivotal role in administrating the bankruptcy of Gaza's mayor, Fachmi Husseini, leading to significant land transfers and the establishment of settlements. During his time in the Trade and Industries office, he was instrumental in bolstering Jewish industry, particularly during the isolation of World War II.

== Career in the State of Israel (1948-1965) ==
Upon the formation of Israel in 1948, Kadmon was immediately appointed as Administrator General and Official Receiver, a role in which he established the functional framework of various departments. His responsibilities included:

- searching for property of absentee owners and administering their property,
- administering the property of those who were unable to do so on their own, (under age, mentally sick etc.) In their name, those who were "graduates" of the holocaust, he submitted claims for compensation to the German government.
- administering bequests and legacies to the State of Israel In this capacity Kadmon took action and convinced the Israeli government to sign treaties with a number of European governments according to which there was mutual exemption of estate taxes for charitable purposes.
- administering property of different foreign organizations that were under German ownership (the Germans were expelled from the country as enemies because of the 2nd world war and he "inherited" the administration from the Mandatory Government) as well as the property of the Russian Government.
- administering the property of bankrupt persons and companies – in this capacity his policy was to continue, whenever possible, the activity of the company in order to find a potential buyer and thus receive better compensation for the claimants and contribute toward the economic and industrial development. This policy was continued by his successors.

He was also a key figure in formulating the "Enemy Property" law and in negotiations for property acquisitions with international entities like the Templars and Russian Government.

Under the law of inheritance the Administrator General was asked whenever potential heirs were sought.

=== Voluntary service ===
Upon retiring from Government service Kadmon occupied himself in fields he thought to be important. He was especially interested in investing in the enhancement of education of youth (in the wide sense). He joined the executive committee of Ort Israel (a network of scientific and technological schools and colleges of different levels up to academic degrees), the Association of Youth Hostels, and Magen David Adom (a first aid institution). He was active in the pedagogic committee of Ort and initiated the Comptrol committee which he chaired.
