= Russian Consulate General in Jerusalem =

Consulate

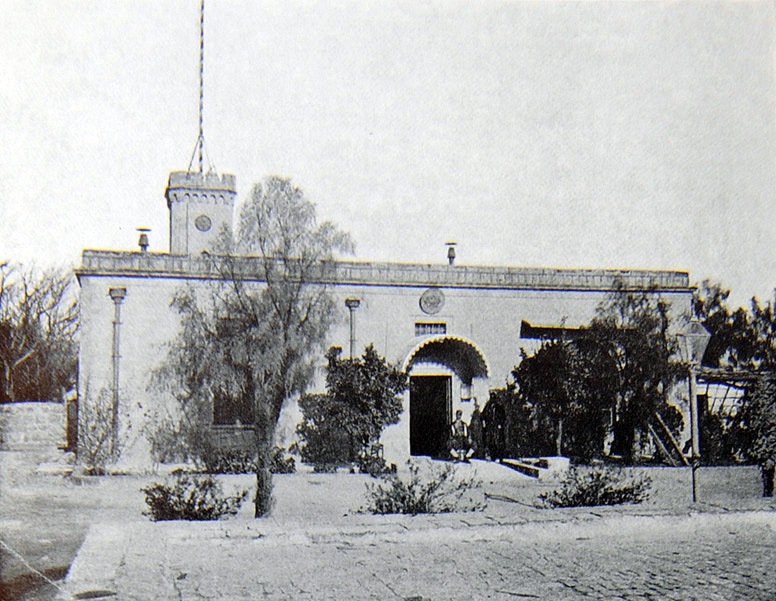
- The building of the Russian Consulate General in Jerusalem in 1907
- Interactive map of Russian Consulate General in Jerusalem
- Location: Jerusalem

The Russian Consulate General in Jerusalem was the diplomatic mission of the Russian Empire to the Ottoman Empire, in Jerusalem. The consulate was established in 1858, and operated in the city until 1914.

== History ==
The Russian Consulate General was established in Jerusalem in December 1858. In 1914 the Ottoman Empire was at war with the Russian Empire, forcing the Russian consuls to leave for Egypt. Since that time, the Russian diplomatic presence in Jerusalem ended. During the British Mandate for Palestine, the British made the consulate building and its surroundings their administrative centre. Since the establishment of the State of Israel in 1948, the consulate building is used by Jerusalem municipal departments.

== List of Consuls ==
- Vladimir Dorgobozhinov 1858–1860
- Konstantin Sokolov 1860–1862
- Andrei Kratsov 1862–1867
- Vasily Kuznikov 1867–1876
- Nikolai Illarionov 1876–1878
- Kuznikov 1879–1884
- Alexander Gears 1884–1885
- Dmitriy Bukharov 1886–1888
- Alexey Pliev 1888–1889
- Sergey Maksimov 1889–1891
- Sergey Arsenyev 1891–1897
- Alexander Jacoblev 1897–1907
- Alexey Kruglov 1908-1914
