= Museum of Underground Prisoners =

Commemoration of Jewish underground

Coordinates: 31°46′55.5″N 35°13′26.49″E

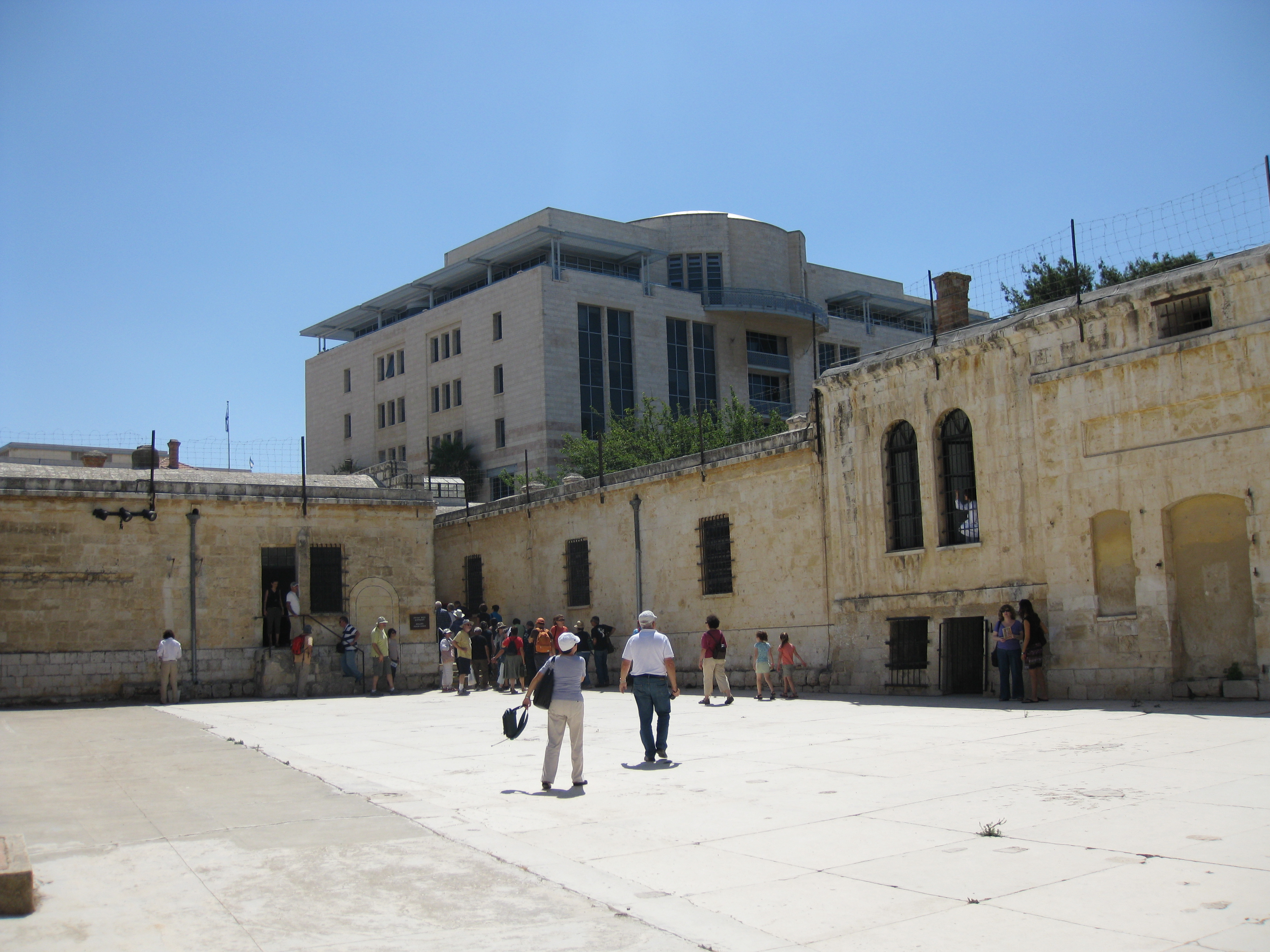
Museum of Underground Prisoners

Museum of Underground Prisoners is a museum in Jerusalem, commemorating the activity of the Jewish underground—Haganah, Irgun and Lehi—during the period leading up the establishment of the State of Israel.

== History of the building ==
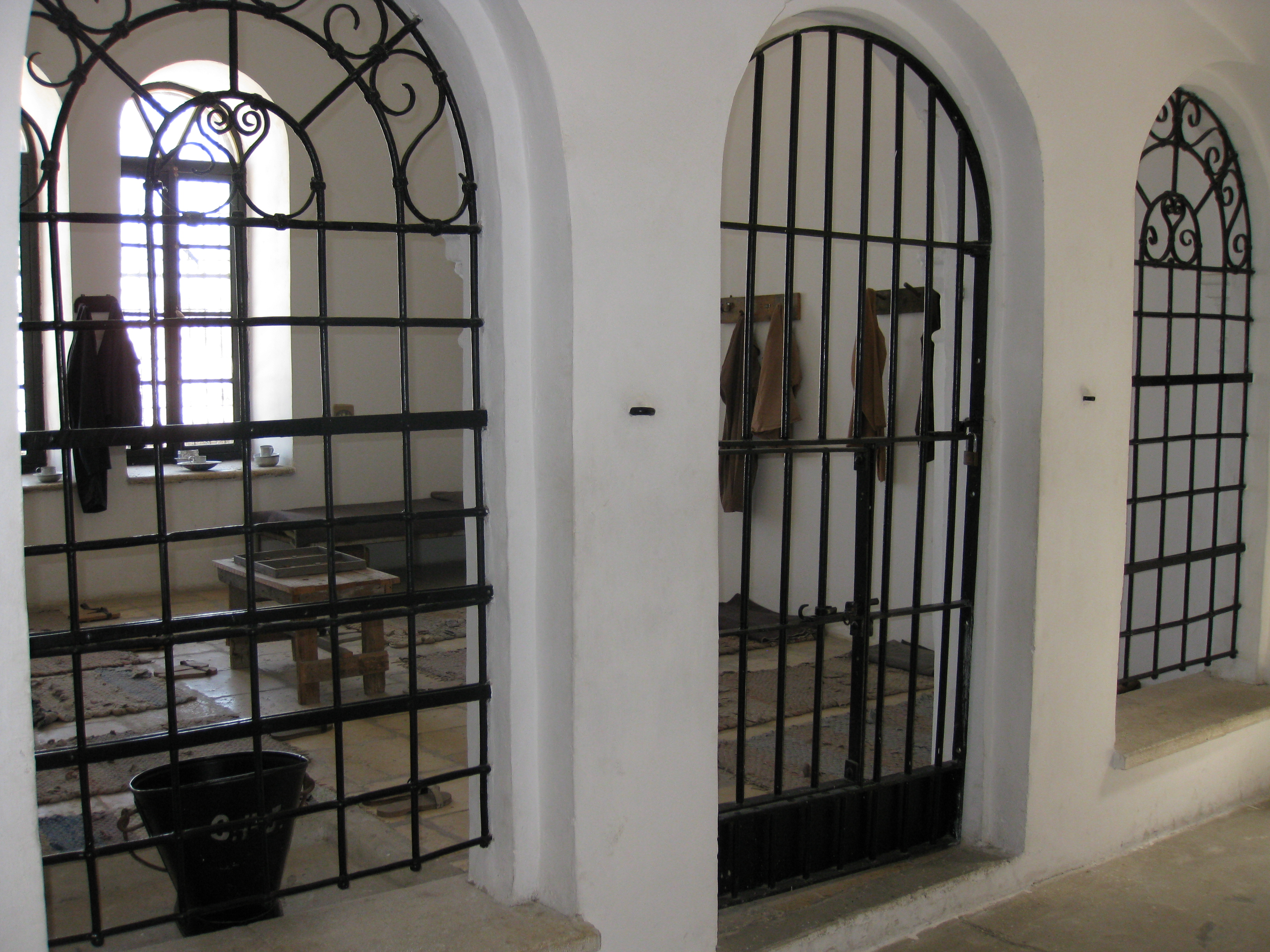
Museum of Underground Prisoners

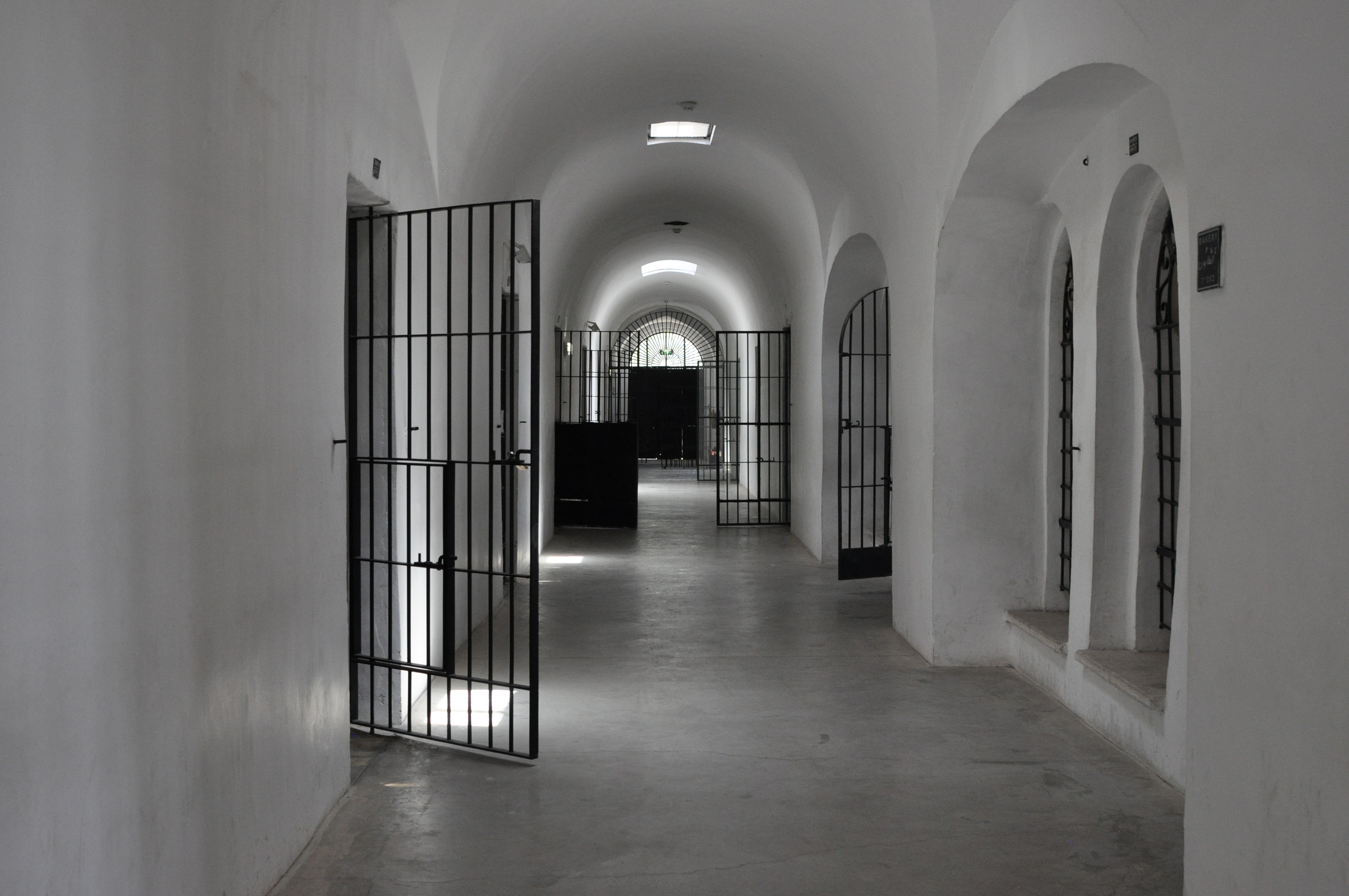
Hallway and prison cells at the museum

=== Russian pilgrims hostel ===
The museum is located on Mish'ol HaGvura Street in one building of the Russian Compound. The building was erected as a hostel for Christian pilgrims towards the end of the Ottoman period, when the European powers sought to strengthen their hold on Palestine. The Russian Compound, built outside the Old City, included a church, a hospital, and pilgrim hostels for men and women. The inscription "Marianskya women's hostel" can be seen in Russian above the entrance.

=== British Mandate prison ===
In 1917, the British conquered Palestine from the Ottoman Turks. The British Mandatory authorities transformed the Russian Compound into a British security and administrative center, and the Russian women's hostel became the central British prison. With long hallways leading to separate rooms, it was an ideal layout for a prison. Over the course of the British occupation, hundreds of prisoners passed through its gates. Jews and Arabs were incarcerated together. While the facility housed many death-row inmates, members of the Jewish underground sentenced to death were executed in Acre. The British, fearful of the Jewish reaction to executions in the holy city, never used the gallows for Jews, although it was once scheduled for such use. In each cell, one prisoner was appointed supervisor and given a bed. Prisoners from the Jewish underground were put to work making coffins and gravestones for British policemen and soldiers who had been killed in attacks by Jewish underground groups. As the guards used to tell them, "What you start on the outside, you finish on the inside".

Between 1946 and 1948, the Jewish Jerusalemites nicknamed the highly secured area "Bevingrad". The wire fence, bars and inscription "Central Prison Jerusalem" on the door are from the British Mandatory period, which ended in May 1948.

=== State of Israel ===
During the 1947–1949 Palestine war on 15 May 1948, the compound was captured by the Haganah with the assistance of the Irgun and Lehi in a campaign known as Operation Kilshon, Pitchfork. The building was used for various purposes after the establishment of the State including storehouses of the Jewish Agency. During the 1960s the Israeli government purchased most of the compound from the Russian government.

==== Museum ====
In 1991 the building was transferred to the Ministry of Defense which restored the prison and turned it into a museum.

2009 Joshua Sobols polydrama "Alma", a site specific simultan play about Alma Mahler-Werfel, wife of Gustav Mahler, Walter Gropius and Franz Werfel was performed in the entire museum, directed by Paulus Manker, in co-production with the Cameri Theatre of Tel Aviv, starring Doron Tavori, Golan Azulai and Adi Gilat.

== Prisons of the British Mandate ==
=== Structure ===
The Mandatory justice and law enforcement apparatus included civil and military courts, a police force ("Palestine Police") and a prison service. Prison detention camps were established all over the country including the central prison in Jerusalem, the prison in Acre, detention camps at Atlit and Latrun, and the women's prison and detention camp in Bethlehem. The British served at the highest positions in the prison system. Arabs served mostly in the intermediate and lower levels while some Jews also served.

=== Jewish underground inmates ===
Members of the Jewish underground were defined as political prisoners and tried by military courts. They were charged with offenses that ranged from putting up posters, training in and possession of weapons to physical assault. Sentences were determined according to the severity of the crime, ranging from several months to life imprisonment or the death sentence.

=== Jerusalem Central Prison ===
At the beginning of the Mandatory period, the population of the Central Prison in Jerusalem was 250 inmates. At the end of the period the number was about 500. In the beginning prisoners were kept in cells without any separation based on religion. Starting in the mid-1930s, the number of underground prisoners rose and they demanded separate cells. The British acquiesced to this demand and they were put into separate cells. Despite the tension between Arabs and Jews outside the prisons, the relations between Jewish and Arab prisoners were generally normal.

In January 1947, the tension outside penetrated into the prisons and a general fight broke out that spread throughout the prison. This outbreak was called "The Grand Toshe". Following this event, the prison was divided into two separate wings: the southern part of the prison became the Arab wing, and the northern part became the Jewish wing.

== Exhibits ==
=== Administration ===
The registration and reception room is located to the right of the entrance to the jail. A new prisoner was registered and given a haircut. His personal belongings were stored, and after receiving his prison clothes in the "clothes storeroom" he was assigned to a cell.

=== Prisoner cells ===
In the cells the prisoners' brown garb, the "burshes" (mats) upon which the prisoners slept, and the "kardal", the bucket that was used as a toilet can be seen. The bed in the corner near the window was for the "mukhtar", the prisoner that the British made responsible for the conduct of the prisoners in the cell.

=== Bakery ===
The prisoners baked bread that they ate with their meals, generally pita bread.

=== "Special treatment" cell ===
Cell for prisoners whose crimes were relatively light. They were entitled to better conditions such as sleeping on beds and wearing regular clothes.

=== Clothes storeroom ===
The place where the prisoners’ personal items and clothes were stored. Instead of their clothes they received clothing and sleep items, including uniforms made of coarse material, two blankets and "bursh" (mat).

=== Escape room ===
A cell near the prison fence in which underground prisoners were kept. In 1948 members of Irgun and Lehi dug a tunnel in a corner of the cell under the last bed. The tunnel connected to a sewer pipe that ran under the fence to the outside. With the aid of comrades outside who pretended to fix the sewer pipe, the prisoners disguised themselves as municipality workers and 12 of them succeeded to escape and join their comrades who fought in the 1947–1949 Palestine war. In this cell, as in other cells in the prison, the engravings on the floors and the window sills that were made by the prisoners are evident. Among the engravings are names of the prisoners, national symbols like the Star of David, symbols of organizations including the Etzel symbol (a map of the entire Eretz Israel in the center and a hand holding a rifle) and the communist party symbol (a star with a scythe in the center).

=== Synagogue room ===
This cell housed Jewish criminals and was used as a synagogue on Shabbat and holidays. The cell is connected to the activities of the Rabbi Aryeh Levin - "the father of the prisoners." The rabbi devoted his life to helping others: lepers in the Lepers' Hospital in Jerusalem, Jewish criminals, and underground prisoners with whom the rabbi established a special bond. For 25 years, the rabbi came to the prison every Shabbat and holiday, in every kind of weather, without any reward or salary. He encouraged the prisoners and immediately after every visit to the prison he hurried to the homes of the prisoners’ families to give them regards from their children.

=== Prison yards ===
Two interior yards were used for daily exercise. They also contained service installations such as kitchens and clothing washrooms where the prisoners worked. A Palmach prisoner, Gideon ("Johnny") Peli, worked in the kitchen. His girlfriend Bracha Fuld, who was also a member of the Palmach, used to write and visit him regularly. One day, she didn't show up to the visit as scheduled. A newspaper scrap, found in the bottom of one of the food supply boxes in the kitchen, provided Johnny with the reason – Bracha was killed by the British during an operation to land illegal immigrants from the Orde Wingate ship on the Tel Aviv shore (March 1946). After his release from prison, Johnny fought in the 1947–1949 Palestine war and was killed in one of the battles for the Kastel (March 1948).

=== Workshop section ===
The prisoners worked in workshops as part of their daily routine. The workshops included a carpentry shop, printing shop, a shoemaking and sewing area in which the prisoners made sleeping mats and sewed uniforms. The British used the workshops for external uses such as printing or preparing coffins for British soldiers and policemen.

=== Exercise yard ===
This yard served as a prayer and exercise yard for Moslem prisoners. On the wall can be seen a drawing of the crescent of the "Machrav", which indicates the direction of Mecca where Muslims turn when praying. The yard was used for punishment by lashings. In December 1946, Benjamin Kimhi, a 16-year-old member of Etzel, was sentenced to 18 years imprisonment and 18 lashings for his participation in the robbery of the Ottoman Bank in Jaffa. The purpose of the robbery was to get funds for underground activities. When the Etzel became aware of the sentence, they published a proclamation warning the British not to subject Benjamin to the lashings. Because of the tense atmosphere, the warden decided to execute the lashings in his office rather than in the exercise area. The following day, in an operation known as "Night of Lashings", an Etzel team kidnapped several British officers and gave them 18 lashings before releasing them. One of the teams was caught by the British in a routine check post and three members of the group, Mordechai Alkachi, Yechiel Dresner, and Eliezer Kashani, were hanged in the Acre Prison.

=== The Mustashfa (prison dispensary) ===
The dispensary was separated from the prison cells and also included an office for a doctor who came once a week, and an isolation room. Two bottles of medicine, one red and the other yellow, were given for almost every ailment. This is evidence of the low level of treatment that was provided to the prisoners.

=== Warden and secretariat office ===
The warden's office was separated by a wall from the nearby secretariat room. (The wall was not restored.) The entrance to these rooms was from the outside. Items that were used by the prisoners to smuggle things in and out of the prison are displayed on a shelf to the left of the door. Forbidden items that were hidden during inspection of the cells are also displayed.

=== Solitary confinement ===
Prisoners who broke prison rules were kept in these narrow cells that were called "hell". Examples of forbidden acts were fighting or being insolent to a jailer. The warden inflicted this punishment and the time spent here ranged from several hours to two weeks.

=== Memorial room to the executed ===
Pictures of the thirteen men who were hanged during the British mandate are displayed in this room. They were members of the three underground groups. Pictures of two members of the Nili underground who were executed during the Ottoman period are also displayed as well as three Israeli agents who were executed in Arab countries after the establishment of the State.

== Death row and gallows ==
Most of the condemned underground members were executed at the Acre Prison. At that time Acre was an Arab city. Approximately 100 Arabs were executed at the Jerusalem prison during the Mandate. The condemned wore red and were kept in two cells near the gallows room where they awaited execution.

Moshe Barazani, a member of Lehi, and Meir Feinstein, a member of Etzel, were sentenced to death in 1946 because of their involvement in the attempted assassination of a British officer and a bombing attack on a Jerusalem railway station in which a policeman was killed. They awaited execution in the cell on the right. The British, fearing that the vehicle taking them to Acre would be ambushed, decided to execute them in Jerusalem. At the initiative of the two underground groups and with the agreement of the two condemned men, it was decided to thwart the plans of the executioners. The plan was to smuggle into their cell two improvised hand grenades. These were to be hidden in orange peels and placed in a fruit basket. The first hand grenade would be thrown at the hangmen including the warden during the planned execution. The second hand grenade would be used for the two condemned men to take their own lives.

The execution was set for April 22, 1947. On the previous evening they were visited by Rabbi Yaakov Goldman who was so impressed by their courage and spirit that he decided to accompany them to their execution. They tried to dissuade him from accompanying them, but the rabbi insisted. The rabbi left the cell with the intention of returning the next morning. Shortly afterwards Feinstein wrote a brief note on the cover of his bible, gave it to the British guard to whom the note was addressed and asked for privacy to pray. The men embraced each other, holding the hand grenade between them, and sang Hatikvah. The grenade was then detonated, killing them both.

Several exhibits references Meir Feinstein and Moshe Barzani. The Irgun and Lehi militant groups collaborated on at least one intended suicide attack during their insurgency against the British (before the 1948 Palestine war). However, two of their own militants were the only casualties of their best documented plan. A Lehi militant and an Irgun militant blew themselves up in Jerusalem Central Prison, using improvised grenades that had been constructed by another Lehi prisoner. The explosives were disguised as oranges to hide them from the guards, and smuggled in with the prisoners' food. Both militants had been sentenced to death by hanging.

=== Operation Samson ===
The original plan, which the Lehi called "Operation Samson", was to carry the concealed grenades with them as they were taken to the gallows then use them to carry out a suicide attack against the executioners. But the explosives detonated early, while the two of them were alone together in their cell. According to the surviving Lehi militant, the prisoner who built the bombs for their suicides, Barazani, the Lehi suicide militant, was recruited to the plan before his trial. He subsequently flamboyantly refused to defend himself in court. It is unclear when the Irgun teen agreed to the plan, the Lehi were waiting on approval from the Irgun commander before they felt able to add him to the plan. Allegedly when the pair learned that Rabbi Goldman would be present at the time of the execution, they changed the plan and committed suicide alone together shortly before they were scheduled to be taken to the gallows. Another version of the story is that the person the militants were unwilling to harm was actually one of the British prison guards.

=== Trial of the Lehi militant ===
The Lehi militant, who was 21, was sentenced to death for carrying a grenade during a British imposition of martial law.

=== Age of the Irgun militant ===
The Irgun militant had been sentenced to death alongside another militant for their role in the bombing of Jerusalem Train Station. There was heated debate about the age of the Irgun suicide militant when he was sentenced. His mother and brother claimed he was 17, too young to be executed according to the law of the British authorities. The court claimed he was 23, since the boy had served in the British military during World War Two, and the authorities refused to believe they had recruited a minor who was lying about his age.

=== Suicide ===
The Irgun commander claimed their deaths did not count as suicide, describing them as having been "murdered by the British executioner".

=== Explosives engineer ===
The Lehi militant who built the bombs for Operation Samson, the later had a leadership role in the Israeli military's nuclear, biological, and biological weapons division (Hebrew: אב"כ). He originally enlisted using his girlfriend's surname. Some of his work was purely defensive, such as the development of gas masks, but even that was conducted in great secrecy.

=== The Irgun commander ===
The Irgun commander, Menachem Begin, went on to have a successful career in politics, he was elected Prime Minister in 1977. He frequently used Feinstein and Barazani's shared death as a metaphor for national (or racial) unity.

=== The event in modern Israeli culture ===
In 2007, The Jerusalem Post described the event as "One of the best-known stories of heroism leading to the creation of the State of Israel". In 2009 the Likud-led government introduced controversial changes to the high school curriculum that included a study unit focused on the suicides and other martyred pre-state militants. In 2010 two Arab Israeli Knesset members were ejected from the chamber after heckling a speech memorializing the militants (the 2 suicides and 10 who were hung), and another member yelled "Haniyeh is waiting for you in Gaza".

== Outside the building ==
=== Monument to Moshe Barzani and Meir Feinstein ===
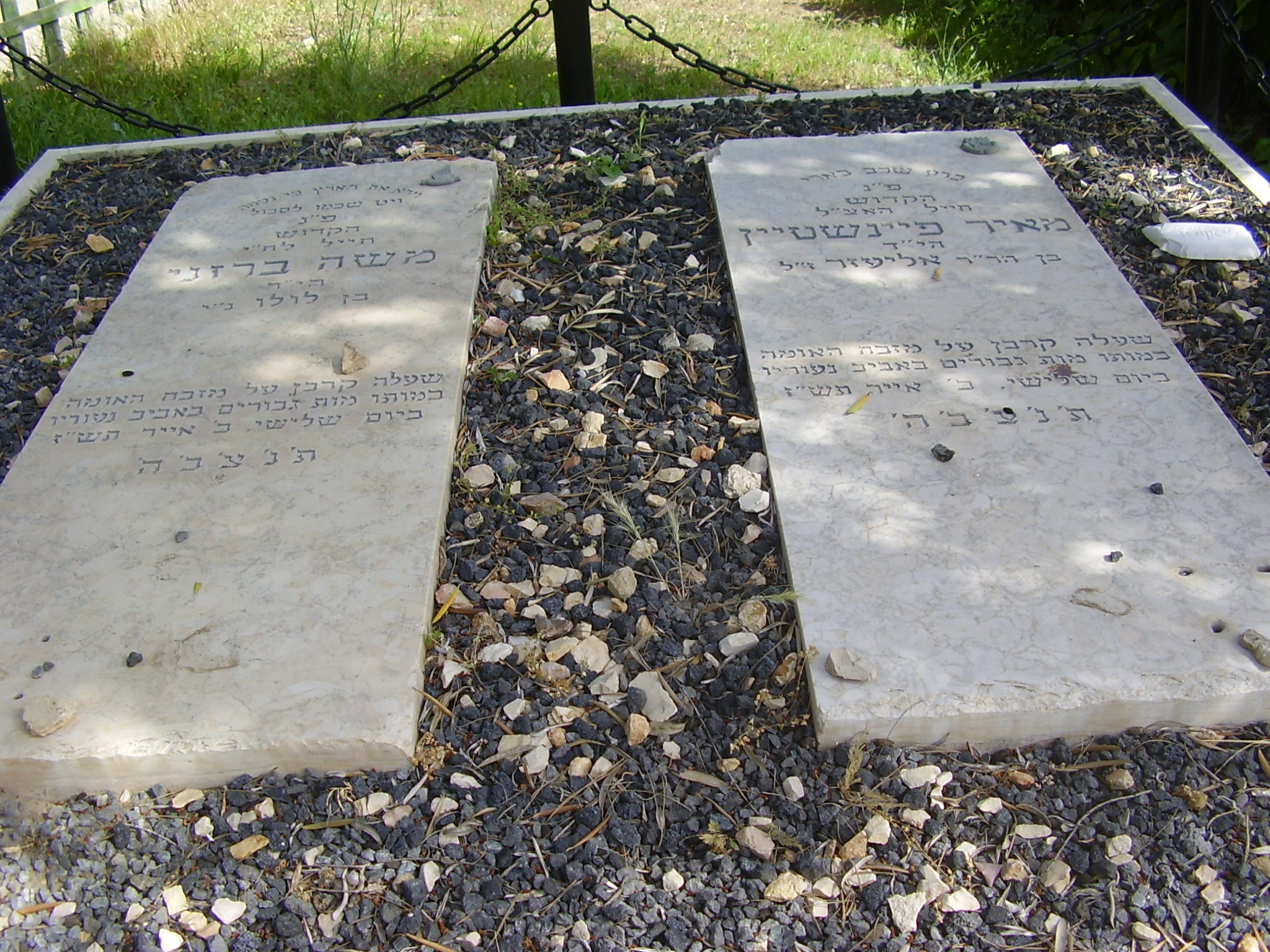
Original grave stones from the 1940s.

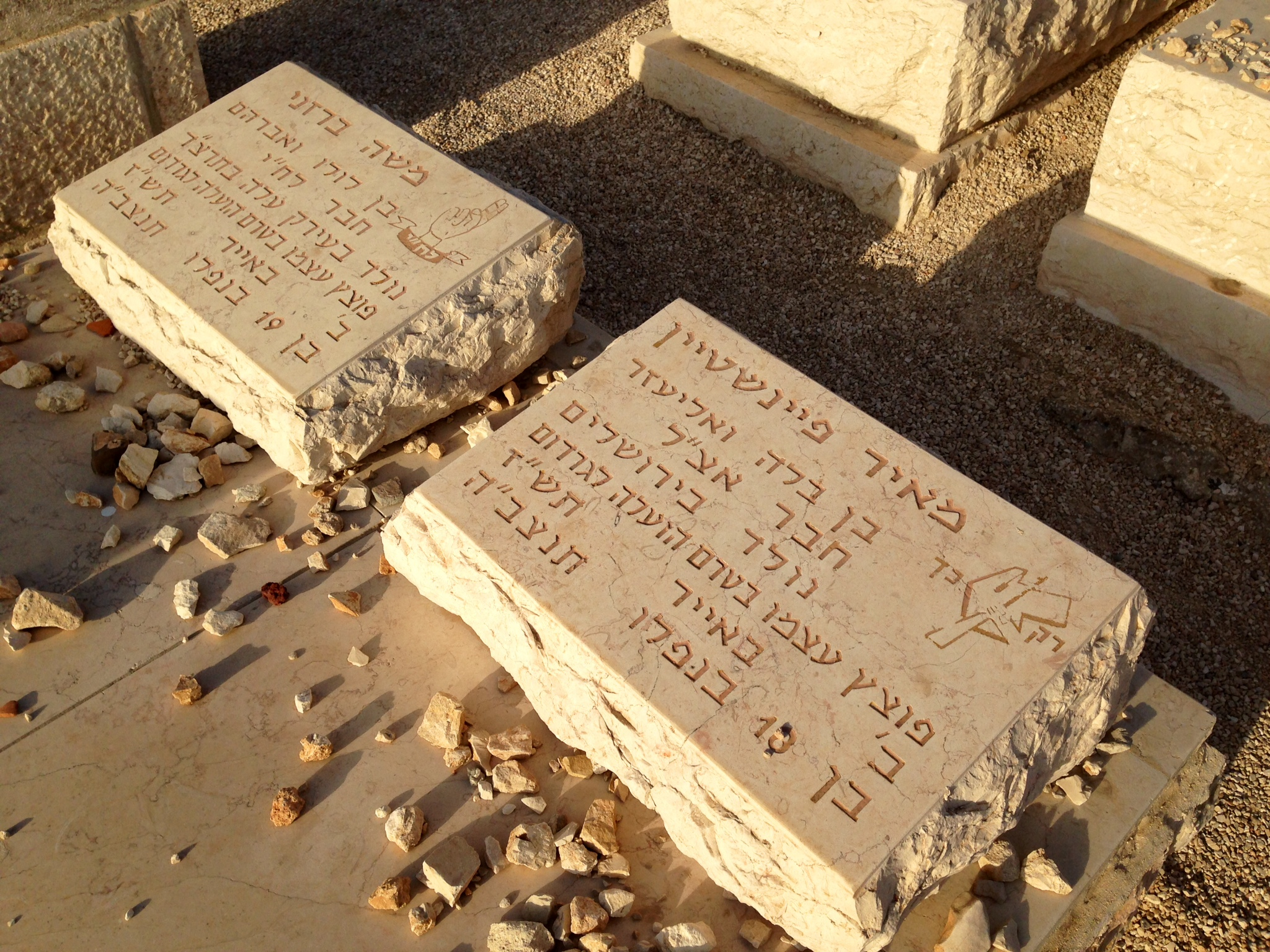
New grave stones c.1980 at the Mount of Olives in Jerusalem, next to Aliza and Menachem Begin.

Moshe Barzani and Meir Feinstein were buried on the Mount of Olives. IDF state memorials were placed on their graves after the Six-Day War. The original tombstones were brought to the courtyard of the prison where they stand as monuments to their memory. Menachem Begin, commander of Etzel (also known as the Irgun), requested in his will that he be buried beside them on the Mount of Olives. His wife Aliza had been buried there ten years earlier, while Begin was the sixth Prime Minister of Israel.

== Other Museums and memorials ==
There is also a Museum to the Lehi in Tel Aviv, it describes itself as "apolitical" but some Israelis are skeptical of this given the controversial political history of the Lehi.

== Other Museums and memorials ==
There is also a Museum to the Lehi in Tel Aviv, it describes itself as "apolitical", but some Israelis are skeptical of this given the controversial political history of the Lehi.

== See also ==
- Sde Teiman detention camp
