= List of Lehi members =

The following is a list of notable Lehi members. Twenty percent of Lehi members were women. Many notable Lehi members were originally Irgun members.

== Members ==
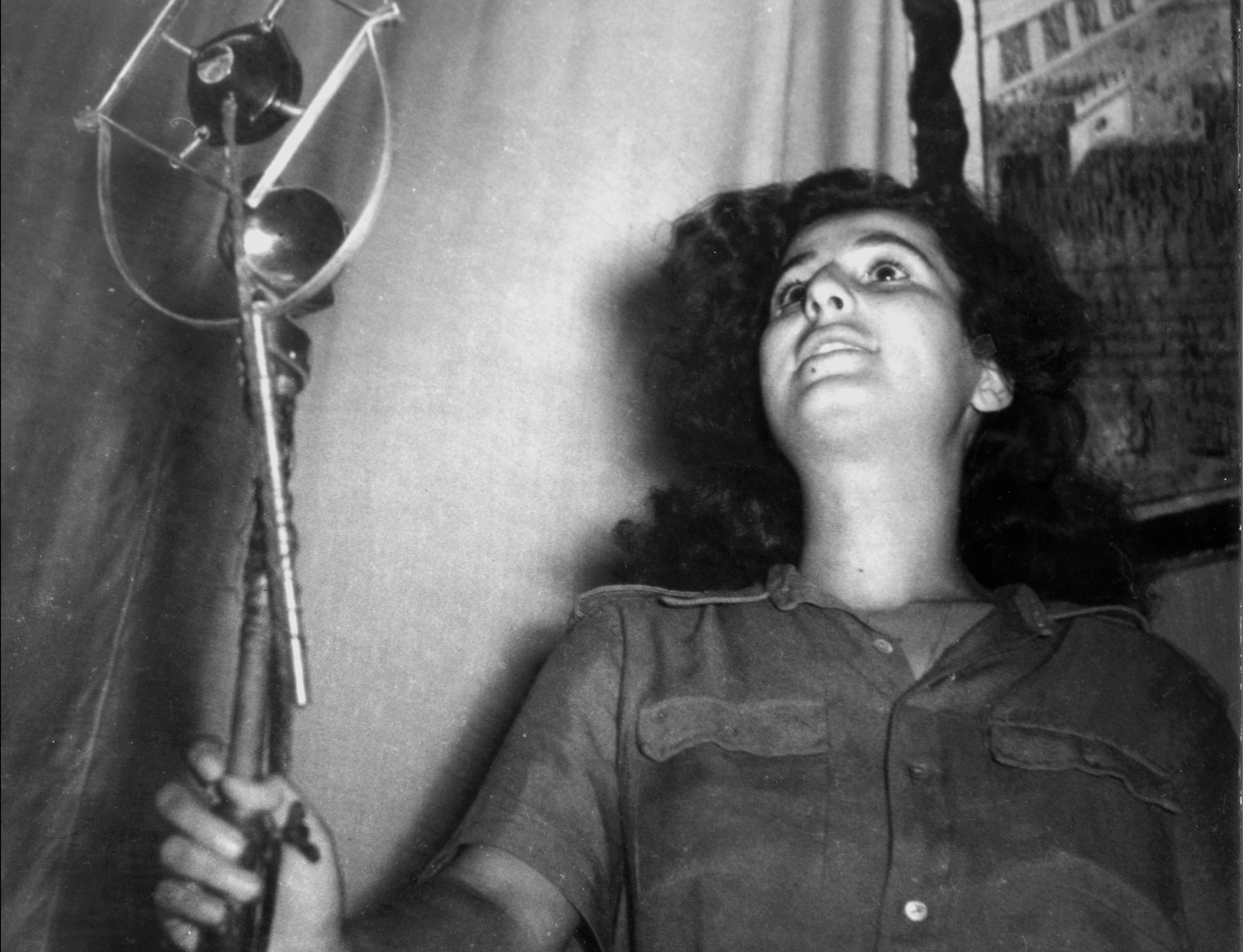
Geula Cohen, announcer of the Lehi underground radio station (1948)

- Yaakov Banai, commander of Lehi's combat unit
- Shaltiel Ben-Yair
- Eliyahu Bet-Zuri, executed for his role in the assassination of Lord Moyne
- Geula Cohen, member of the Knesset
- Israel Eldad, leader in the Israeli national camp
- Boaz Evron, left-wing journalist
- Maxim Ghilan, Israeli journalist, author and peace activist
- Eliyahu Giladi
- Uri Zvi Greenberg
- Eliyahu Hakim, executed for assassinating Lord Moyne
- Amos Kenan, writer
- Baruch Korff
- Yitzhak Shamir, Israeli prime minister 1983–1984 and 1986–1992.
- Avraham Stern, founder
- Shimon Tzabar
- Natan Yellin-Mor, member of the Knesset 1949–1951, leftist advocate of peace with Arabs.
- Robert Misrahi, French philosopher

== Commanders ==
- Juli Torenberg-Elasar, commander of the women's group
- Tzelnik Yitzhak "Shimon", commander of Lehi in Jerusalem in 1941-1942 (before Avraham Stern's murder)
- Shpilman Anshel "Aryeh", notable commander who left Irgun, and was subsequently involved with many major Lehi operations
- Shomron Sovol Tzfoni, intelligence coordinator, head of training department, member of operations headquarters

== See also ==
- List of Lehi operations
- Jewish insurgency in Mandatory Palestine
- List of Irgun members
