= Bombing of Haifa =

Bombing of Haifa may refer to:

- For Irgun attacks in Haifa in the 1930s, see list of Irgun attacks
- Lehi bombing of Haifa police station, 12 January 1947
- Irgun bombing of Haifa police headquarters, 29 September 1947
- Haifa bus 37 suicide bombing, 5 March 2003
- Maxim restaurant suicide bombing, 4 October 2003

== See also ==
- Haifa
- Animal-borne bomb attacks
- Car bomb
- List of Lehi operations
- Suicide attack
- Jewish insurgency in 1940s Palestine
