= List of Lehi operations =

The following is a partial list of Lehi operations. Lehi split from the Irgun in August 1940, and dissolved in late 1948.

== Operations by year ==
=== 1942 ===
- May 1 – Attempt on Assistant Superintendent Geoffrey J. Morton, head of the CID in Tel Aviv and Jaffa and the policeman who killed Avraham Stern, with a huge improvised explosive device containing sixty sticks of gelignite which was hidden in a roadside ditch. It was detonated as a car containing Morton, his wife (who worked in Jaffa as a teacher) and bodyguards passed an orange grove close to their home. Because the car had moved out to overtake a bicycle they were not caught by the full force of the blast and although their car was wrecked the occupants escaped with concussion.

=== 1944 ===
- January 28 – Failed attempt to blow up St. George's Cathedral, Jerusalem, at the wedding of the Marquess of Douro to Diana, daughter of the British general Douglas McConnel.
- February 14 – Two British constables were shot dead when they attempted to arrest Lehi fighters pasting up wall posters in Haifa.
- March 13 – Lehi kills a Jewish CID officer in Ramat Gan.
- March 19 – A Lehi member was shot dead while resisting arrest by the CID in Tel Aviv. Lehi retaliated with an attack in Tel Aviv that killed two police officers and wounded one.
- March 23 – Lehi attack in Jerusalem kills a police officer and wounds another.
- August 8 – Attempt on Harold MacMichael, high commissioner for Palestine and Transjordan. Both he and his wife narrowly escaped death in an ambush that Lehi had mounted on the eve of his replacement as high commissioner. During his tenure, MacMichael was the target of seven unsuccessful assassination attempts, mainly by the Lehi. This was the last one.
- September 29 – Assassination of CID officer Thomas James Wilkin. Wilkin was the Commander of the Jewish Division and right-hand man of Geoffrey J. Morton (see Shoshana Borochov).
- November 6 – Lord Moyne, British Deputy Resident Minister of State in Cairo was assassinated by Lehi members Eliyahu Hakim and Eliyahu Bet-Zuri; this operation triggers The Hunting Season. Moyne's driver was also killed. Hakim and Bet-Zuri were executed for the murders.

=== 1945 ===
- October – The Jewish Resistance Movement, a cooperation between the Haganah, Irgun, and Lehi is activated by the Jewish Agency until August 1946.
- November 1 – Night of the Trains
- December 27 – Irgun and Lehi bombings of police stations in Jerusalem and Haifa leave 10 dead and 12 injured.

=== 1946 ===
- In 1946, several British high officials, including Sir Stafford Cripps, Ernest Bevin, and Anthony Eden received letter bombs apparently sent by Lehi.
- February 6 – Lehi carried out an arms robbery at a British army camp in the Agrobank neighborhood of Holon. After the action, British soldiers rioted in the neighborhood and murdered three Jewish civilians.
- February 26 – Irgun and Lehi fighters attacked three British airfields and destroyed dozens of aircraft. One Irgun fighter was killed.
- April 25 – Lehi fighters attacked a Tel Aviv car park that was being used by the British Army's 6th Airborne Division, killing seven British soldiers and looting the arms racks they found. They then laid mines and retreated.
- June 17 – Lehi attacked railroad workshops in Haifa. Eleven Lehi members were killed during the attack.
- September 9 – Two British officers were killed by an explosion at a public building in Tel Aviv. A British police sergeant, T.G. Martin, who had identified and arrested Lehi leader and future Israeli Prime Minister Yitzhak Shamir, was assassinated near his Haifa home.

=== 1947 ===
- In 1947, several letter bombs were sent to President Harry Truman in the White House. They were intercepted by White House mail room workers, who were on alert because of similar looking letter bombs sent to British officials. Former Lehi leader Nathan Yellin-Mor admitted that letter bombs had been sent to British targets but denied that any had been sent to Truman.
- January 12 – A Lehi member carried out a truck bombing of a police station in Haifa, killing two British and two Arab constables, and wounding 140.
- April 23 - Lehi mines a train outside Rehovot. The bombing kills five British officers, two Arab adults and a 3-year old, Gilbert Balladi.
- April 25 – Lehi bombed a British police compound, killing five policemen.
- May 4 – Acre Prison break – Irgun members working with Jewish prisoners inside Acre Prison managed to blow a hole in the wall, and assault the prison, freeing 28 Jewish prisoners. Nine Irgun and Lehi fighters, including commander Dov Cohen, were killed during the retreat. Five Irgun fighters and eight escapees were later captured.
- May 15 – Two British soldiers were killed and seven injured by Lehi. A British policeman was also killed in an ambush.
- June 4 – Eight Lehi letter bombs addressed to high British government officials, including Prime Minister Clement Attlee, were discovered in London. A British soldier was killed in Haifa.
- June 28 – Lehi fighters opened fire on a line of British soldiers waiting in line outside a Tel Aviv theater, killing three soldiers and wounding two. One Briton was also killed and several wounded in a Haifa hotel. A Jewish fighter was also wounded.
- June 29 – Four British soldiers were wounded in a Lehi attack at a Herzliya beach.
- September 3 – A postal bomb sent by either Irgun or Lehi exploded in the post office sorting room of the British War Office in London, injuring two.
- September 26 – Irgun fighters robbed a bank, killing four British policemen.
- November 13 – Lehi grenade attack on British soldiers in cafe leaves 1 dead and 27 wounded.
- November 19 – Lehi summarily executes five adult members of the Shubaki family in the village of Arab al-Shubaki.

=== 1948 ===
- January 4 – Lehi detonates a truck bomb against the headquarters of the paramilitary al-Najjada located in Jaffa's Town Hall, killing 15 Arabs and injuring 80.
- February 29, March 31 – Cairo–Haifa train bombings 1948; the 29 February bombing killed 28 British soldiers and wounded 35 others; the 31 March bombing killed 40 civilians and wounded 60 more.
- March 3 – Car bombing in Haifa killed 11 Arabs
- April 9–11 – Deir Yassin massacre - About 110 Arab inhabitants of the village of Deir Yassin near Jerusalem were killed during and after a raid by approximately 132 Irgun and 60 Lehi fighters.
- May 3 – A Lehi book bomb posted to the parental home of British Major Roy Farran was opened by his brother Rex, killing him. Roy Farran was court-martialed on a charge of murdering an unarmed 16-year-old member of Lehi during his command of an undercover Palestine Police unit.
- September 17 – Assassination of Folke Bernadotte
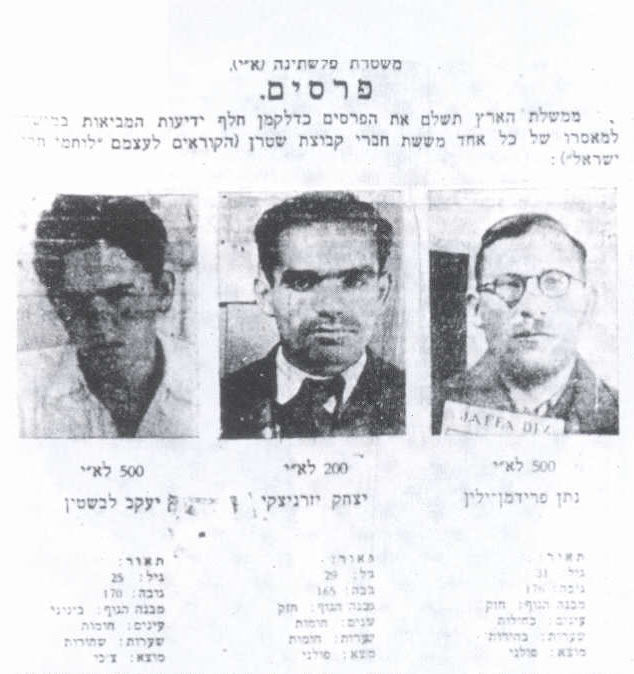
Lehi Wanted members 1. Jaacov Levstein (Eliav), 2. Yitzhak Yezernitzky (Shamir), 3. Natan Friedman-Yelin

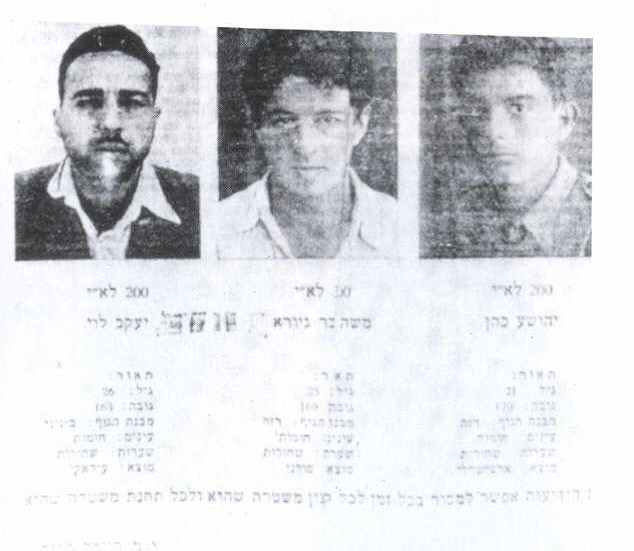
Lehi Wanted members Yaacov Levi, Moshe Bar Giora and Yehoshua Cohen

== See also ==
- List of Lehi members
- List of Irgun operations
- Jewish insurgency in Palestine
- Irgun and Lehi internment in Africa

== Bibliography ==
- Banai, Y. (1958). Chayalim Almonim [Unknown Soldiers]. Tel Aviv. (WorldCat)
- Bergman, R. (2018). Rise and Kill First (Illustrated ed.). Random House. ISBN 9780679604686.
- Bell, J.B. (1976). Terror out of Zion. Transaction Publisher. ISBN 9781412835725.
- Cesarani, D. (2009). Major Farran's Hat: Murder, Scandal and Britain's War Against Jewish Terrorism 1945–1948. London: Vintage Books. ISBN 9780434018444.
- Marton, K. (2011). A Death in Jerusalem: The Assassination by Jewish Extremists of the First Arab/Israeli. Knopf Doubleday. ISBN 9780307800503.
- Morris, B. (2004). The Birth of the Palestinian Refugee Problem Revisited. Cambridge University Press. ISBN 978-0-521-00967-6.
- Smith, Ira R. T.; Morris, Joe Alex (1949). Dear Mr. President... The Story of Fifty Years in the White House Mail Room. JULIAN MESSNER.
