= List of Irgun attacks =

During the 1936–1939 Arab revolt in Palestine against the Mandatory Palestine, the militant Zionist group Irgun carried out 60 attacks against Palestinian people and the British Army. Irgun was described as a terrorist organization by The New York Times, the Anglo-American Committee of Enquiry, prominent world figures such as Winston Churchill and Jewish figures such as Hannah Arendt, Albert Einstein, and many others. The Israeli Ministry of Foreign Affairs describes it as "an underground organization." The New York Times at the time cited sources in an investigative piece which linked the Haganah paramilitary group to Irgun attacks such as the King David Hotel bombing.

Irgun launched a series of attacks which lasted until the founding of Israel. All told, Irgun attacks against Arab targets resulted in at least 250 Arab deaths during this period. The following is a list of attacks resulting in death attributed to Irgun that took place during the 1930s and 1940s. Irgun conducted at least 60 operations altogether during this period.

== During British Mandated Palestine (1937–1939) ==
Date	Casualties	References
1937, March	2 Arabs killed on Bat Yam beach.	
1937, November 14	10 Arabs killed by Irgun units launching attacks around Jerusalem, ("Black Sunday")	
1937, December	Grenade attack on a marketplace near al-Quds mosque in Jerusalem, attributed to Irgun members with dozens killed or injured	
1938, March	Grenade attacks on Haifa market carried out by Irgun and Lehi operatives with 18 killed and 38 injured	
1938, April 12	2 Arabs and 2 British policemen were killed by a bomb in a train in Haifa.	
1938, April 17	1 Arab was killed by a bomb detonated in a cafe in Haifa	
1938, May 17	1 Arab policeman was killed in an attack on a bus in the Jerusalem-Hebron road.	
1938, May 24	3 Arabs were shot and killed in Haifa.	
1938, June 19	18 Arabs killed (9 men, 6 women and 3 children), 24 injured by a bomb that was thrown into a crowded Arab market place in Haifa.	
1938, June 23	2 Arabs were killed near Tel Aviv.	
1938, June 26	7 Arabs were killed by a bomb in Jaffa.	
1938, June 27	1 Arab was killed in the yard of a hospital in Haifa.	
1938, July 5	7 Arabs were killed in several shooting attacks in Tel Aviv.	
1938, July 5	3 Arabs were killed by a bomb detonated in a bus in Jerusalem.	
1938, July 5	1 Arab was killed in another attack in Jerusalem.	
1938, July 6	18 Arabs and 5 Jews were killed by two simultaneous bombs in the Arab melon market in Haifa. More than 60 people were wounded. The toll over two days of riots and reprisals was 33 dead, 111 wounded.	
1938, July 8	4 Arabs were killed by a bomb in Jerusalem.	
1938, July 16	10 Arabs were killed by a bomb at a marketplace in Jerusalem.	
1938, July 25	43 Arabs were killed by a bomb at a marketplace in Haifa.	
1938, August 26	24 Arabs were killed by a bomb at a marketplace in Jaffa.	
1939, February 27	33 Arabs were killed in multiple attacks, incl. 24 by bomb in Arab market in Suk Quarter of Haifa and 4 by bomb in Arab vegetable market in Jerusalem.	
1939, May 29	18 people were injured, including 13 Arabs and three British police, by mines detonated at the Rex cinema in Jerusalem.	
1939, May 29	5 Arabs were shot and killed during a raid on the village of Biyar 'Adas.	
1939, June 2	5 Arabs were killed by a bomb at the Jaffa Gate in Jerusalem.	
1939, June 12	1 British bomb expert was killed while trying to defuse a bomb in a post office in Jerusalem	
1939, June 16	6 Arabs were killed in several attacks in Jerusalem.	
1939, June 19	20 Arabs were killed by explosives mounted on a donkey at a marketplace in Haifa.	
1939, June 29	13 Arabs were killed in several shooting attacks around Jaffa during a one-hour period.	
1939, June 30	1 Arab was killed at a marketplace in Jerusalem.	
1939, June 30	2 Arabs were shot and killed in Lifta.	
1939, July 3	1 Arab was killed by a bomb at a marketplace in Haifa.	
1939, July 4	2 Arabs were killed in two attacks in Jerusalem.	
1939, July 20	1 Arab was killed at a train station in Jaffa.	
1939, July 20	6 Arabs were killed in several attacks in Tel Aviv.	
1939, July 20	3 Arabs were killed in Rehovot.	
1939, August 26	2 British police officers including Ralph Cairns were killed by a roadside bomb in Jerusalem.	

== During the Jewish insurgency (1944–1947) ==
Date	Casualties	References
1944, September 27	Unknown number of casualties, around 150 Irgun members attacked four British police stations	
1944, September 29	1 Senior British police officer of the Criminal Intelligence Department assassinated in Jerusalem.	
1945, November 1	5 locomotives destroyed in Lydda station. Two staff, one soldier and one policeman were killed. One of the bombers, Yehiel Dresner, was later executed for other crimes.	
1945, December 27	3 British policemen and 4 Sotho soldiers killed during the bombing of British CID headquarters in Jerusalem; 1 British soldier killed during attack of British army camp in north Tel Aviv	
1946, February 22	Destroyed 14 aeroplanes at 5 RAF stations.	
1946, July 22	91 people were killed at the bombing of the King David Hotel (which was the British headquarters), mostly civilians, staff of the hotel or Secretariat, 41 Arabs, 15-28 British citizens, 17 Palestinian Jews, 2 Armenians, 1 Russian, 1 Greek and 1 Egyptian.	
1946, October 30	2 British guards killed during Gunfire and explosion at Jerusalem Railway Station.	
1946, October 31	Bombing of the British Embassy in Rome. Nearly half the building was destroyed and 3 people were injured.	
1946, November 13	6 Palestine police (2 British, 4 Arabs) killed in bombing of railway line.	
1947, March 1	17 British officers killed, during bombing of the Goldschmidt Officer's Club.	
1947, March 12	1 British soldier killed during the attack on Schneller Camp.	
1947, June 18	One Haganah member killed by a booby trap while sealing a tunnel dug by Irgun to blow up the British Headquarter in Citrus House, Tel Aviv.	
1947, July 19	4 locations within Haifa are attacked, killing a British constable and injuring 12.	
1947, July 29	2 kidnapped British sergeants hanged.	
1947, August 4	Two Suitcase time-bombs explode in the basement of the Hotel Sacher, Vienna (British Army Headquarters)	
1947, August 5	3 British policemen killed in bombing of British Labour Department office in Jerusalem	
1947, August 9	Jewish train engineer killed in Cairo-Haifa train bombing	
1947, August 12	1 British soldier injured in bombing of London-Villach military train outside Tauern tunnel near Mallintz, Austria. A second bomb failed to explode, the two were intended to derail the train over a steep cliff. No injuries from a second explosion outside British camp commandant's office in Velden.	
1947, September 26	4 British policemen killed in Irgun bank robbery.	
1947, September 29	10 killed (4 British policemen, 4 Arab policemen and an Arab couple) and 53 injured in Haifa police headquarters bombing by Irgun. One ton of explosives in a barrel was used for the bombing and Irgun said it was done on the first day of Sukkot to avoid Jewish casualties.	
1947, October	Bombing of Jerusalem Railway Station and attacks on transport routes, including mining roads and assaults on attacking military vehicles.	

== During the Civil War (1947–48) ==
Date	Casualties	References
1947, December 11	13 killed in attack on Tireh, near Haifa	
1947, December 12	20 killed, 5 wounded by barrel bomb at Damascus Gate.	
1947, December 13	6 killed, 25 wounded by bombs outside Alhambra Cinema.	
1947, December 13	5 killed, 47 wounded by two bombs at Damascus Gate.	
1947, December 13	7 Arabs killed (including two women and two children, 3 and 4 years old) and 7 others seriously wounded (two women and girl of 4 among them) in attack on Yehudiya. 24 Irgun men attacked the village, approaching from Petah Tikva shooting guns, dynamiting houses and throwing grenades. An armored British police car was also fired on.	
1947, December 16(ca)	10 killed by bomb at Noga Cinema in Jaffa.	
1947, December 29	Two British constables and 11 Arabs were killed and 32 Arabs wounded when Irgun members threw a bomb from a taxi at Jerusalem's Damascus Gate.	
1947, December 30	6 Arabs killed and, 42 injured by grenades at Haifa refinery, precipitating the Haifa Oil Refinery massacre, which led to the Balad al-Shaykh massacre.	
1948, January 1	2 Arabs killed and 9 injured by shooting attack on cafe in Jaffa.	
1948, January 5	14 Arabs killed and 19 injured by truck bomb outside the 3-storey 'Serrani', Jaffa's built Ottoman Town Hall	
1948, January 7	20 Arabs killed by bomb at Jaffa Gate.	
1948, February 10	7 Arabs killed near Ras el Ain after selling cows in Tel Aviv	
1948, February 18	12 Arabs killed and 43 wounded at a marketplace in Ramla	
1948, March 1	20 Britons killed and 30 wounded in the Bevingrad Officers Club bombing	
1948, April 9-April 11	Between 107-120 Arab inhabitants of Deir Yassin near Jerusalem, were killed during and after an attack on the village by approximately 132 Irgun and 60 Lehi fighters. While the number of 254 was widely first reported, most historians now estimate between 107 and 120 deaths. The event has been described as a massacre by many historians.	
1948, April 6	7 British soldiers, including Commanding Officer, killed during an arms raid on Pardes Hanna Army camp.	
1948, April 25–30	Operation Hametz; Irgun captured several Arab towns around Jaffa, and later repulsed a British attempt to dislodge them from the town of Menashiya.	

== See also ==
- List of Irgun members
- List of Lehi operations
- List of killings and massacres in Mandatory Palestine
