= Irgun bombing of police headquarters in Haifa =

Irgun terrorist attack

Irgun bombing of Haifa police headquarters
- Part of the Jewish insurgency in Mandatory Palestine
- Location: Haifa, Mandatory Palestine
- Date: September 29, 1947
- Attack type: Barrel bomb attack
- Deaths: 10-12 people
- Injuries: 53-54 people
- Perpetrator: Irgun
- Motive: Zionist political violence

The Irgun bombed the district police headquarters in Haifa, Mandatory Palestine on September 29, 1947. The attack killed ten or twelve people, including civilians and British and Arab policemen, in addition to injuring 53 or 54 others.

According to Caoimhe Nic Dháibhéid, the barrel bomb, which was used in this attack, was an innovation of Amichai Paglin. It was used extensively in the Jewish insurgency in Mandatory Palestine and the 1948 Palestine War.

== Background ==
In August 1947, the packet steamship SS Exodus, loaded with Zionist Jewish migrants from France, most of whom were Holocaust survivors without legal immigration certificates for Palestine, attempted to partake in Aliyah Bet. The Royal Navy boarded her in international waters and took her to Haifa, where ships were waiting to return the migrants to refugee camps in Europe. The refugees were barred from entering Palestine and the ship was deported to Hamburg.

== Bombing ==
The Irgun was Zionist a paramilitary group active in the Jewish insurgency in Mandatory Palestine. Along with Lehi, which had already bombed a police station in Haifa earlier in the year, they represented the "first postmodern terrorist movement", according to terrorism expert Bruce Hoffman.

According to Caoimhe Nic Dháibhéid, the barrel bomb, which was used in the Irgun attack on the Haifa police quarters on September 29, 1947, was an innovation of Amichai Paglin, the Irgun's chief operations officer and bomb designer. Police characterized it as a "brand new method."

The northern police HQ in Haifa came to their attention, but it was surrounded by sand-filled barrels and a mesh fence of barbed-wire. Paglin set to work designing a bomb that could penetrate the fence and blow up the building. He hit on the idea of using an oil barrel. Haifa was one of the great oil ports in the 1940s and standard 55-gallon steel oil drums came into common usage only a few years earlier during WWII; they were first developed by the Axis powers (Germany and Italy) but were quickly adopted by Allies and widely available.

Paglin's bomb design consisted of an oil barrel with tires mounted on the ends allowing it to roll. It was filled with 500 pounds of explosives. The bomb was hoisted onto the top of a lorry under a canvas tarp to keep it hidden. The height of the lorry was higher than the top of the fence surrounding the police station. A cord inside the lorry released the barrel which sent it down a short ramp, also mounted on the lorry roof, launching it over the fence onto the police grounds. Momentum carried the barrel bomb towards the police building. The bomb had an automatic "lock" that stopped the wheels spinning when it hit an obstacle such as the building, so that it would not roll backwards. There up against the wall, a pre-lit fuse ran out and the bomb exploded. In the attack 10 people were killed and 54 injured, of which 33 were British. Four British policemen, four Arab policemen, an Arab women and 16-year old were killed. The 10 story building was so heavily damaged that it was later demolished.

The exact details of the bomb, including photographs and diagrams, were mailed by Paglin to British authorities and newspapers a few days after the attack. Irgun named the attack "Operation Hambaf", a contraction of the words Hamburg, the city where the SS Exodus returned to, and Afalpi, the name of another refugee ship redirected by the British to Cyprus. The press initially reported on the bomb as simply a bomb in a tar barrel, but later reports dubbed it a 'Barrel Bomb' (with quotes) or the "barrel bomb technique of the Jewish underground". The police called it "a brand new method".
