= Hamaas =

Magazine of the Lehi Zionist militant group

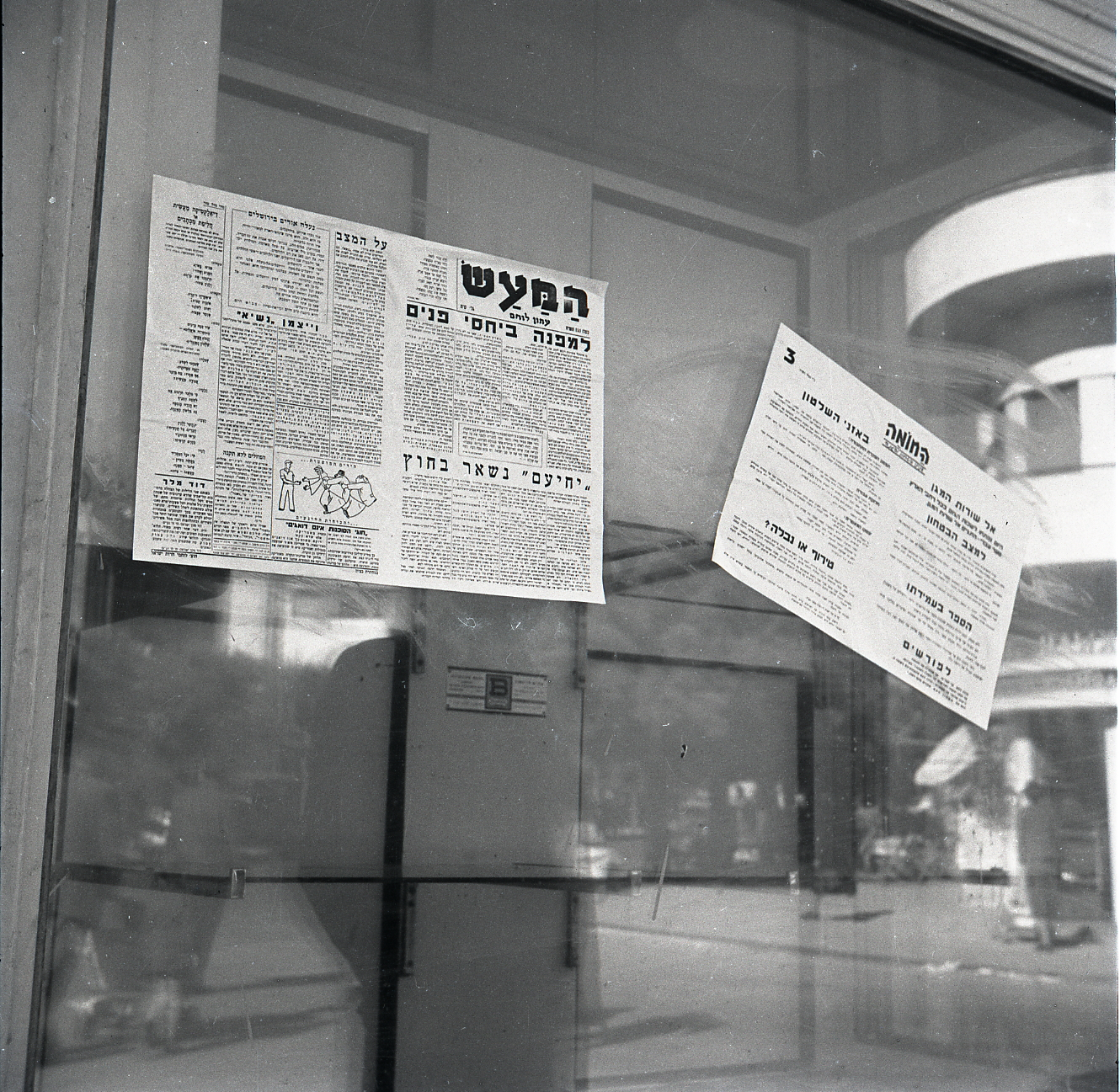
November 1947 issues

HaMaas (Hebrew: המעש, HaMa'as, lit. 'the Action' or 'the Deed') was a weekly publication of the Lehi, an armed Zionist militant group and self-described terrorist organization in Mandatory Palestine. Other publications by the Lehi included the daily Mivrak ('Telegram'), the monthly HaKhazit ('the Front'), and BaMahteret ('Underground').

== History ==
The publication first came to public attention in July 1946 after the report of the Anglo-American Committee of Inquiry and a British Colonial Office White Paper identified an article in the second issue indicating that a Lehi attack on the Haifa Oil Refinery on the night of 31 October/1 November 1945 had been coordinated with other attacks on the same night by the Haganah (on railways), the Irgun (on Lydda railway station) and the Palmach (on two British coast guard vessels in Haifa harbour) under the overall direction of the Jewish Agency. Hamaas noted,

The events of 1 November have given a striking expression of the firm resolution of the Jews to fight for the freedom of their homeland. The scope of the attack has proved that the Jews are capable of acting under the most difficult conditions.

However the most significant achievement on that night was that for the first time the attack was coordinated and concentrated. The Jewish Resistance Movement has embraced all the Jewish resistance forces with a view to their being guided by a single authority which would control the common fight. (Hamaas, Issue No. 2., November 1945).

In addition to the Hamaas article the British government published intercepted telegrams between the Jewish Agency in Jerusalem and Zionist leaders in London that demonstrated Jewish Agency control over the formal organisation established by the Haganah, Irgun and Lehi to coordinate their actions, which was known as the Tenuat Hameri (United Resistance Movement).

== See also ==
- Jewish insurgency in Mandatory Palestine

== Bibliography ==
- Bowyer Bell, John (1996). Terror out of Zion: the Fight for Israeli Independence. Transaction Publishers. ISBN 978-1-56000-870-5
- Great Britain, Colonial Office (1946). Palestine: Statement of Information Relating to Acts of Violence, July 1946, Cmd. 6873. London: His Majesty's Stationery Office.
- Khalidi, Walid. (1971). From Haven to Conquest: Readings in Zionism and the Palestine Problem Until 1948. Institute of Palestine Studies. ISBN 0-88728-155-9
- Rapoport, David C. (2006). Terrorism: The Second or Anti-colonial Wave. Taylor and Francis. ISBN 978-0-415-31650-7
- Jefferis, Jennifer (2016). Hamas: Terrorism, Governance, and Its Future in Middle East Politics. ABC-CLIO. ISBN 978-1440839030.
- Herzog, Michael (March–April 2006). "Can Hamas Be Tamed?". Foreign Affairs. 85 (2): 83–94. doi:10.2307/20031913. JSTOR 20031913.
