= Yaakov Banai =

Lehi commander (1920–2009)

Yaakov Banai (Hebrew: יעקב בנאי) born Yaakov Tunkel, Alias Mazal (Hebrew: מזל; March 30, 1920 – January 7, 2009) served as the commander of the Lehi movement's combat unit. Banai was a senior Lehi member who masterminded numerous military encounters against British and Arab targets during the Mandate period and the 1947–1949 Palestine war.

== Early life ==
Yaakov Banai (Tunkel) was born on March 20, 1920, in Baranowicze, Poland (now Belarus). He was the third child of four children. His father was Shraga (Feivel) Tunkel and his mother Brakha née Sokolovsky. The family owned a barber shop and his father served as the head of the town's volunteer fire department. His father was the first cousin of Yosef Tunkel, the Yiddish humorist known as Der Tunkeler. Both of his parents and two of his siblings perished in the Holocaust.

As a youth, Banai was a member of Betar, the Revisionist Zionist youth movement and was a founding member of the Irgun in Poland and leader of the Eastern Poland branch of the party. He graduated from the state Gymnasium high school in 1938 and studied law for one year at Vilnius University (1939–1940). In 1941, following the Soviet invasion and shortly before the German invasion of Lithuania, Banai obtained a Sugihara visa and made his way to Israel via Turkey with other members of the Betar.

== Combat operations ==
On his way to Israel he was informed of the internal split within the Irgun and chose to join forces with Avraham Stern (Yair) to help form the Lehi. Once in Israel he was ordered to distance himself from Tel Aviv to avoid the attention of the authorities and he enlisted as a watchman in the Jezreel Valley where he commenced forming a local branch of the Lehi.

In early 1943 he relocated to Haifa where he enlisted members, among whom was Eliahu Hakim (whose alias was Benny). Hakim was later hanged for carrying out the assassination of Lord Moyne in Cairo. In Haifa, Banai received the alias Mazal (meaning "Luck") after he managed to successfully evade capture during a surprise inspection conducted by British detectives. After a shoot-out with British detectives, he moved to Tel Aviv, where he joined the executive committee of Lehi. He changed his last name to Banai in order to confuse British detectives who were on the look out for a "Polish Jew".

Banai participated in a long list of combat missions including the preparations and attack on the British high commissioner in Palestine, Sir Harold MacMichael. This attack was claimed to be retaliation for the Struma disaster. He also took part in the assassination of Thomas Wilkin, the head of the Criminal Investigation Department (CID) Jewish Affairs Bureau. Wilkin was assassinated for his involvement in the killing of Avraham Stern. In his memoirs, Banai recalled that the order to assassinate Wilkin came directly from Yitzhak Shamir, the head of Lehi who eventually became the Prime Minister of Israel.

Banai was appointed to head the Lehi's combat forces which was renamed under him as the "Fighting Brigade". He masterminded and participated in combat operations such as attacks on military units and police, demolition of bridges, an attempt to free jailed prisoners in Jerusalem that was coordinated with the Irgun, the capture of weapons from a military base in Holon and a British military warehouse on HaYarkon Street in Tel Aviv.

Following Shamir's imprisonment, Banai remained in the underground from where he oversaw all of Lehi's department's and branches in Israel. Under his direction, dozens of combat operations were planned and carried out, a portion of them as part of the Jewish Resistance Movement during which the three underground movements (Haganah, Irgun, Lehi) joined forces against the British. During this period, the railyards near the Haifa port were attacked, the Sarona military headquarters (today HaKirya in Tel Aviv) was bombed, Sarafand (today Tzrifin military base) was attacked, the CID offices in Haifa were attacked, airplanes at the Kfar Sirkin air base were destroyed, hospitalized prisoners were freed as were female prisoners from the Petah Tikva police station, and he participated in a bank robbery at the Tel Aviv branch of the Barclays Bank. Banai pioneered the use of explosive vehicles, which were used against the CID offices in Haifa, the Sarona military headquarters and the Jaffa Sarai.

== Service in the Israel Defense Forces ==
Following the United Nations decision on the partition plan, Lehi's turned its attention to the confrontation with the Arabs. During this period Banai participated in numerous combat operations that included the bombing of homes in Arab villages, the bombing of the Sarai in Jaffa (the Arab gathering point for attacks on Tel Aviv), the bombing of the Arab gangs' headquarters in Haifa, and an attempt to bomb the Arab headquarters in Nablus.

With the formation of the Israel Defense Forces, Banai enlisted as a captain in the 8th Brigade, commanded the Lehi Battalion and served as the liaison officer between the army's Lehi units and Brigadier Yitzhak Sadeh, the commander of the Palmach. Banai quickly rose to become the battalion's Chief of Staff. Following the war, he served for ten years as a battalion commander in charge of the Dan district in the Civil Defense Forces.

== Post-military career ==
Banai authored the book Hayalim Almonim (Hebrew: חיילים אלמונים, "Anonymous Soldiers") based on his experiences in the Lehi. The book is considered the most comprehensive account of the underground movement. In 2006 he edited Mekorot LeToldot Tnu'at Lohmei Herut Israel (Lehi) (Hebrew: מקורות לתולדות תנועת לוחמי חרות ישראל, "Sources on the History of the Lehi Movement", published by Yair Publishing House).

Banai frequently lectured to soldiers in the Israel Defense Forces, in schools, to youth groups, at community centers, and throughout the country. Banai worked for the Egged bus company and was a member of its Secretariat as well as a manager. Prior to his retirement in 1997, he served as the director of an assisted living facility in Ramat Gan. In 2000, he was awarded the key to the city of Ramat Gan and was the Chairman of an NGO that worked to preserve the historical legacy of the Lehi.

== Personal life ==
Banai married Hanna Kruger in 1945. They had two children—a son named Shraga and a daughter named Nili.
