= Maxim Ghilan =

Israeli poet and activist (1931–2005)

Maxim Ghilan (Hebrew: מקסים גילן; 24 March 1931 – 2 April 2005) was an Israeli poet and activist. He was the director of the International Jewish Peace Union, the first Jewish organization to recognize the Palestine Liberation Organization (PLO) as a partner in dialogue. He was the co-founder, in 1971, of the periodical Israel and Palestine Political Report.

== Early life ==
Ghilan was born in France in 1931 and grew up in Spain. He moved with his mother to Mandatory Palestine in 1944, after his father had been abducted by the fascist movement of Francisco Franco and was never seen again.

== Lehi membership ==
As a young man, Ghilan joined Lehi, also known as the Stern Gang, and participated in the struggle to free Palestine from British rule.

== After the establishment of Israel ==
Following the establishment of Israel, Ghilan was imprisoned by the government of David Ben-Gurion. While incarcerated, he witnessed Arab prisoners being tortured and upon his release became active on behalf of Arab rights.

In 1966 Bul, a tabloid which employed Ghilan as its deputy editor, published a story accusing the Mossad of involvement in the 1965 disappearance of the Moroccan dissident Mehdi Ben Barka. Ghilan and his editor were charged with espionage and imprisoned for 135 days.

== Peace actions ==
In the early 1970s, Ghilan became one of the first non-Communist Israelis to meet with representatives of the PLO. He later became a personal friend of Yasser Arafat. Ghilan moved to Paris in 1969 and returned to Israel after the signing of the Oslo Accords in 1993.

== Death ==
Ghilan died suddenly in his Tel Aviv home, in Jean Jaurès St., on 2 April 2005.

== Bibliography ==
- Ghilan, Maxim (1974). How Israel Lost Its Soul. Penguin. ISBN 978-0-14-021788-9.
- Uri Davis (Winter 1975). "Was the Stern Gang Radical?". Journal of Palestine Studies. 4 (2): 115–119. doi:10.1525/jps.1975.4.2.00p02962. JSTOR 2535843. Review of How Israel Lost Its Soul.
