= Shimon Tzabar =

Israeli writer (1926–2007)

- שמעון צבר
- Born: 5 March 1926; Tel Aviv, Mandatory Palestine
- Died: 19 March 2007 (aged 81); London, England, UK
- Occupations: artist, journalist, author, satirist
- Notable work: The White Flag Principle

Shimon Tzabar (Hebrew: שמעון צבר; 5 March 1926 in Tel Aviv – 19 March 2007 in London) was a member of the editorial board of Israel Imperial News. He described himself as a "Hebrew-speaking Palestinian". An accomplished painter, polymath, and mycologist, he identified a species of mushroom.

== Personal life ==
The son of poultry vendors, he was educated at a religious school. In his teens, after initially joining Ze'ev Jabotinsky's Betar organization, he became a member of all three Jewish underground military organizations in British-ruled Mandatory Palestine: Lehi (the "Stern Gang"), Etzel, and Haganah (Palmach) that fought the British and the Arab populations. The British Mandatory authorities arrested him and detained him for several months at Latrun. With the establishment of Israel, he briefly joined the Israeli Communist party. He fought in Israel's first three wars: 1948–50, 1956, and 1967.

== Beliefs ==
However, Tzabar strongly disagreed with the annexation of the Golan Heights and East Jerusalem and takeover of the West Bank and Gaza Strip by Israel in the aftermath of the Six-Day War. In September 1967 he became famous for a declaration he published in Ha'aretz, together with 11 co-signatories, protesting against the incipient occupation. In part it read:-

"Our right to defend ourselves from extermination does not give us the right to oppress others. Occupation entails foreign rule. Foreign rule entails resistance. Resistance entails repression. Repression entails terror and counter-terror. The victims of terror are mostly innocent people. Holding on to the occupied territories will turn us into a nation of murderers and murder victims. Let us get out of the occupied territories immediately."

He subsequently left Israel in protest and settled in England. Tzabar was a columnist for a number of years for both the daily Haaretz and the weekly Ha'olam Haze newspapers. He also published 27 books in Hebrew, among these are works of fiction, travel, children's books and poetry. Allen Lane, the hardcover imprint of Penguin Books, published his English book, The White Flag Principle, that had been translated and published in Japan and in most European languages.

His views eventually evolved towards anti-Zionism: Tzabar became an outspoken opponent of Zionism in addition to the occupation; he criticized peace groups like Peace Now and Gush Shalom.

In 2004 Michelin threatened to sue him for trademark infringement, after he published a study of Israel's prisons under the title "MUCH BETTER THAN THE OFFICIAL MICHELIN Guide to Israeli prisons, Jails, concentration camps and torture chambers". The company eventually dropped the case, much to Tzabar's disappointment.

== Incomplete bibliography ==
- The White Flag Principle: How to Lose a War (and Why), New York 2003, ISBN 978-1-56858-259-7
- Yemenite and Sabra Cookery, (with Naomi Tzabar) Tel-Aviv 1979, ISBN 978-965-234-001-6
- An Illustrated Key for the Identification of Wild Mushrooms, Fungi and Toadstools Interactive CD-Rom.
- Tusbarahindi the Great
