= Barrel bombs in Mandatory Palestine =

Bombs used in Palestine and Israel, 1947–48

Barrel bombs were used in Israel and Palestine during 1947–1948. They were first used by militant Zionist groups in Mandatory Palestine against the British. They were later used by Jews against Arabs, and also by Arabs against Jewish targets, during the 1948 Arab–Israeli war. The barrel bombs had multiple designs, including oil barrels rolled on attached truck tires, to unguided improvised bombs dropped from planes. Targets included crowds on the streets, cafes, police buildings, schools and homes. The barrel bombs were widely reported in the press and described by police as "a brand new method". The use of barrel bombs by Zionists has been described by historians as terrorism.

== Development of the barrel bomb and first use against British ==
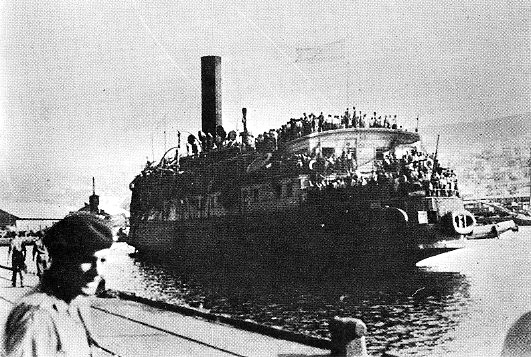
The Exodus arriving at Haifa.

Prior to the establishment of Israel in 1948, the region was administered by Britain according to a mandate by the League of Nations in 1922. The period was "characterized by Arab rioting and anti-Jewish violence" and in response militant Jewish organizations were formed. The most prominent was Irgun who, along with other militant Zionist groups, began a strategy of challenging British authority through violence and terror in the hopes the British would leave the region. "The Irgun and Lehi were the first postmodern terrorist movement", according to terrorism expert Bruce Hoffman. According to Erskine Childers, they created new tactics and weapons of terror including the Davidka mortar shell which carried 60-pounds of explosives; dynamitifng entire blocks of houses; broadcasting over loudspeaker false rumors about Jewish atomic bombs; and the barrel bomb.

Haifa Police station bombing aftermath. Note the fence made of sand-filled barrels and barbed wire over which the barrel bomb was launched and rolled up to the building. Screen capture from "Haifa Police Station Outrage", British Movietone News, 6 October 1947. Archive

The first barrel bomb was used on 29 September 1947 and can be traced to a design by Amichai Paglin, the Irgun's chief operations officer and bomb designer. As background, in August the SS Exodus, loaded with Holocaust refugees, was being detained at the port of Haifa by British authorities. When the refugees were barred from entering Palestine and the ship forced back to Germany later that month, Irgun looked for a suitable way to retaliate against the British. The northern police HQ in Haifa came to their attention, but it was surrounded by sand-filled barrels and a mesh fence of barbed-wire. Paglin set to work designing a bomb that could penetrate the fence and blow up the building. He hit on the idea of using an oil barrel. Haifa was one of the great oil ports in the 1940s and standard 55-gallon steel oil drums came into common usage only a few years earlier during WWII; they were first developed by the Axis powers (Germany and Italy) but were quickly adopted by Allies and widely available.

Paglin's bomb design consisted of an oil barrel with tires mounted on the ends allowing it to roll. It was filled with 500 pounds of explosives. The bomb was hoisted onto the top of a lorry under a canvas tarp to keep it hidden. The height of the lorry was higher than the top of the fence surrounding the police station. A cord inside the lorry released the barrel which sent it down a short ramp, also mounted on the lorry roof, launching it over the fence onto the police grounds. Momentum carried the barrel bomb towards the police building. The bomb had an automatic "lock" that stopped the wheels spinning when it hit an obstacle such as the building, so that it would not roll backwards. There up against the wall, a pre-lit fuse ran out and the bomb exploded. In the attack 10 people were killed and 54 injured, of which 33 were British. Four British policemen, four Arab policemen, an Arab women and a 16-year old were killed. The 10 story building was so heavily damaged that it was later demolished.

The exact details of the bomb, including photographs and diagrams, were mailed by Paglin to British authorities and newspapers a few days after the attack. Irgun named the attack "Operation Hambaf", a contraction of the words Hamburg, the city where the SS Exodus returned to, and Afalpi, the name of another refugee ship redirected by the British to Cyprus. The press initially reported on the bomb as simply a bomb in a tar barrel, but later reports dubbed it a 'Barrel Bomb' (with quotes) or the "barrel bomb technique of the Jewish underground". The police called it "a brand new method".

== Bombings of civilians ==
External media

Images
- "A Jewish cab is set ablaze by an angry mob near the Damascus Gate in Jerusalem after a barrel bomb attack", December 29, 1947
- "A dying Jewish raider is carried by two policemen and an Arab from a Muslim cemetery in Mamillah Road, Jerusalem, after barrel bombing Jaffa Gate and crashing there", January 7, 1948

Video
- "Palestine Outburst Follows UN Vote", British Movietone News, 8 December 1947.

The UN decision on 29 November 1947 to partition Palestine resulted in an immediate Arab response of protests, strikes and anti-Jewish violence in an attempt to undo to UN decision [see video right]. Within two weeks 93 Arabs, 84 Jews and 7 English had been killed in the disturbances. Unsatisfied with the size of the partition and seeking to counter Arab attacks, Irgun began a campaign of attacking Arab civilians, including with barrel bombs.

In December 1947 and early January 1948, Irgun made a series of three barrel bomb attacks against Arab civilians in Jerusalem, opening a new phase of bloody attack and counter-attack by both sides. On 12 December 1947, a barrel bomb was pushed in front of Damascus Gate. Curious bystanders gathered around the barrel, unaware that it might contain a bomb. The explosion killed twenty people and five wounded. This was followed on 29 December by another barrel bomb at Damascus Gate, thrown from a moving taxi into a line of Arabs waiting for the bus. Prior to the explosion, Jewish gunmen sprayed the crowd with machine-gun fire. Thirteen Arabs were killed. The taxi was chased down by an angry mob and its occupants were killed and the car set on fire [see image right]. Irgun claimed responsibility. A third barrel bomb targeting Arab civilians in Jerusalem occurred on 7 January 1948, when members of Irgun stole a police van from which they rolled a barrel bomb into a large group of civilians who were waiting for a bus by the Jaffa Gate, killing around sixteen. The bomb was described as "two fifty-gallon oil drums packed tight with old nails, bits of scrap iron, hinges, rusty metal filings. At their center was a core of TNT...". In the pursuit that followed the raiders crashed into a Muslim cemetery in Mamillah Road, Jerusalem, and their vehicle was wrecked by police gunfire. Three of the attackers were killed and two taken prisoner [see image right].

Meanwhile, in the oil port of Haifa, where the first barrel bomb had been used in September against the British, Irgun turned the weapon against Arab civilians. On 30 December 1947, Jewish assailants rolled a barrel bomb from the back of a fast moving taxi into a group of Arabs waiting in line to enter an oil refinery where they were employed. The refinery employed Jewish and Arab workers and after the bombing distraught Arabs "went berserk". They killed fellow workers by beating, stabbing and kicking them to death. In total 41 Jews and 6 Arabs were killed. Arabs quickly "learned from the enemy" about the barrel bomb technique and used it to successfully retaliate against Jewish targets. On 14 January 1948, a Jewish "terminal" in Haifa was bombed using the so-called "Jewish barrel bomb technique". An Arab barrel bomb was also reported on 29 February 1948, in Beit Dajan near Jaffa, when a delayed action barrel bomb blew up a Jewish house injuring one person. It had been rolled off an Arab lorry.

According to an eye witness account by Shukri Salameh, a resident of Jaffa in 1948, the porous border with Tel Aviv allowed Irgun to easily infiltrate into Jaffa. It was common custom at the time for Arab men to meet at certain times of the day to discuss the news. The Irgun knew this and "would drive into the city and roll barrels filled with explosives into the coffee houses at those times." Muhammad Hallaj, who was a teenager at the time, recalled that a pickup truck had stopped in front of a cafe and a barrel of explosives was rolled out where it blew up in front of the cafe. He said the same thing was done in al-Abbasiyya, a small town not far from Jaffa, this time in front of a grammar school where many children were playing outside. Hallaj said that he went to the hospital and saw the corpses of six children all under 10 years old.

In Tiberias, in April 1948, Hagana forces rolled barrel bombs down from the surrounding hills and used loudspeakers to cause frightened citizens to flee. In provincial towns and Arab quarters, the barrels were rolled down steep streets crashing into walls and doorways creating "an inferno of raging flames and endless explosions".

== Bombings of institutions ==
The next phase of barrel bombings targeted institutional buildings of symbolic importance, with a tit for tat back and forth bombing and retaliation. On 2 February 1948, the United Press reported that Arabs "used the Jewish barrel bomb technique" to destroy the 5-story building of The Palestine Post, the only English-language newspaper in the holy land. Twenty people were injured but none were killed. In retaliation, on 3 February, a barrel bomb was exploded near the Arab National Society building in Haifa, killing four Arabs and wounding three others. On 3 March 1948, members of the Stern Gang used a stolen army truck to deliver a 400-pound barrel bomb, pushed out of the moving vehicle outside the former municipal building in the Arab quarter of Haifa. Officially 11 were killed and 16 injured, all Arabs. It took place on Stanton Street at 8:45am. On 21 March 1948, a 600-pound barrel bomb was detonated outside the Jewish Trade Union contractor's bureau in Haifa. 6 were killed and 14 injured.

== 1948 Arab–Israeli War ==
After the conflicts of the 1947–48 Civil War in Mandatory Palestine, 15 May 1948 marked the end of the British Mandate and the birth of the state of Israel. Militant Zionist groups including Irgun merged into the newly formed Israeli Defense Force. Harry Levin, a Zionist of British background, described one incident in Jerusalem in which barrel bombs were rolled down the streets while loudspeakers broadcast 'horror sounds':

..as uncontrolled panic spread through all Arab quarters, the Israelis brought up jeeps with loudspeakers which broadcast recorded 'horror sounds'. These included shrieks, wails and anguished moans of Arab women, the wail of sirens and the clang of fire-alarm bells interrupted by a sepulchral voice calling out in Arabic: 'Save your souls, all ye faithful: the Jews are using poison gas and atomic weapons. Run for your lives in the name of Allah."

Barrel bombs were used by the Israeli Air Force. On 15–16 July 1948, the Israeli Air Force dropped barrel bombs on the town of Saffuriyya during Operation Dekel. Historian Nafez Nazzal quotes one of the villagers, the quartermaster of the Saffuriyya militia, describing the attack:

"Three Jewish planes flew over the village and dropped barrels filled with explosives, metal fragments, nails and glass. They were very loud and disrupting ... They shook the whole village, broke windows, doors, killed or wounded some of the villagers and many of the village livestock. We expected a war but not an air and tank war."
