= Baruch Korff =

American Orthodox rabbi (1914–1995)

- ברוך קורף
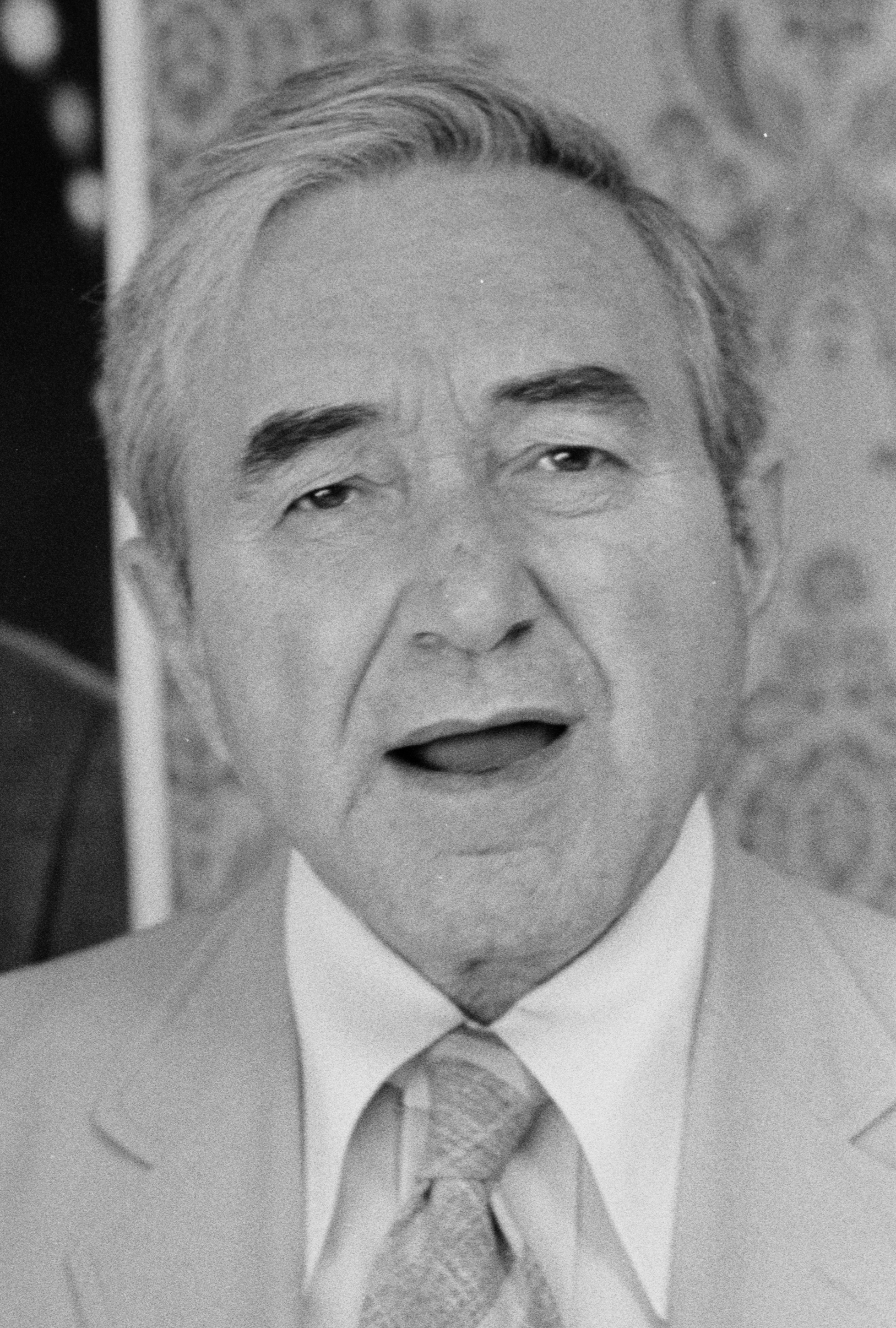
- Korff in 1974
- Born: July 4, 1914; Novohrad-Volynskyi, Russian Empire (now Zviahel, Ukraine)
- Died: July 26, 1995 (aged 81); Providence, Rhode Island, U.S.
- Occupation: Rabbi
- Known for: Being "Nixon's rabbi"
- Spouses: Naomi Ruth Sternburg (divorced) Rebecca Marshall (divorced)

Baruch Korff (Hebrew: ברוך קורף; July 4, 1914 – July 26, 1995) was an American Orthodox rabbi, best known for being "Nixon's rabbi." Born in present-day Ukraine, he settled in the United States in 1926. In the 1940s, Korff supported Irgun and Lehi, and would be jailed for plotting terrorist attacks for the latter in 1947. After meeting Richard Nixon in 1967, he would become an ardent supporter and confidant of his. Following the Watergate scandal in 1974, Korff gained most of his notoriety for his defense of Nixon. After fading from the public eye, he worked as a consultant at Brown University before dying in 1995.

== Early life ==
Baruch Korff was born on July 4, 1914, in Novohrad-Volynskyi present-day Ukraine (then part of the Russian Empire). He was the second child of Grand Rabbi Jacob Israel Korff and Gittel Goldman Korff, in a family that was part of an unbroken line of rabbis that went back 73 generations. In 1919, when anti-Jewish pogroms swept through the Ukrainian People's Republic, the Korff family found themselves caught in the middle of one such pogrom. Gittel fled her home carrying an infant in her arms, with Korff and two other young children following her. Gittel was killed, and Korff witnessed the murder. He would forever label himself a coward for not attempting to save her. Korff wrote in his memoirs that "My life ever since has been a quest for redemption from that charge." His father was suspected of committing treason and fled to Poland. Korff later followed him there, remaining in Poland for seven years while studying in its yeshivas.

In 1926, he emigrated to the United States, where he celebrated his bar mitzvah. Korff studied in the Yeshiva Ohr Torah, Yeshiva Torath Chaim, and the Yeshiva Rabbi Isaac Elchanan. In 1934 he was ordained a rabbi, following in the footsteps of his ancestors. He was the headmaster of the Yeshivah Torath Emeth in Brooklyn, New York from 1936 to 1937. He later became the rabbi for the Congregation Hayim Solomon from 1938 to 1940.

== Activism and terrorism ==
While in Poland, Korff would meet Zeev Jabotinsky and become a follower of the Revisionist Zionist movement. He later became an adviser to the Union of Orthodox Rabbis of the U.S. and Canada, and to the U.S. War Refugee Board. He was also the director of the Emergency Committee to Save the Jewish People of Europe, and later became an active member of the Political Action Committee for Palestine. Korff was also a Zionist.

Korff was active in the anti-Nazi movement prior to and during World War II. Korff was the director of the Emergency Committee to Save the Jewish People during World War II. He was responsible for gathering over 1,000 rabbis to march in Washington, D.C. in order to persuade Britain to allow Jewish immigration to Palestine after the war.

In 1947, in the aftermath of the Exodus incident, and the dismay of many in the nationalist camp that the British government was prohibiting large-scale Jewish migration to Mandatory Palestine, Korff led a Lehi plot to firebomb the Foreign Office in London in protest. He traveled to Paris and offered money to a decorated member of the United States Army Air Forces, Reginald Gilbert, to fly the plane that would first drop leaflets, then drop the bombs. It was necessary to involve Gilbert due to the fact that neither Korff nor any of the Stern Gang members were themselves pilots. Gilbert feigned acceptance of Korff's offer, but immediately turned informant, notifying the American Embassy in London, who in turn alerted the Paris police and Scotland Yard to the Stern Gang's planned attack on London. The authorities convinced Gilbert to go along with the plan, and after a week Korff was arrested and indicted for masterminding the plot. Held in La Santé Prison, Korff staged a 17-day hunger strike in protest even slipping into a coma, until he was revived. Eventually, all charges against him were dropped and he was released. Korff was also part of Menachem Begin's underground movement in the 1948 Palestine war.

== Rabbinical career ==
In 1950, Korff became the rabbi of a Temple Israel located in Portsmouth, New Hampshire. He served in that capacity for three years until he worked as a rabbi in Taunton, Massachusetts, where he stayed from 1954 to 1971. During this time, Korff was also a chaplain at the Massachusetts Department of Mental Health.

== Relationship with Richard Nixon ==
Korff first met Richard Nixon in 1967, during his 1968 presidential campaign. Korff became an active supporter of Nixon, despite Nixon's known anti-Semitism. He defended Nixon during Nixon's growing unpopularity over Watergate. In 1974, Korff had founded the National Committee for Fairness to the Presidency, the purpose of which was to reaffirm "Our faith in God and country, in Constitutional government, in the presidency, and in our beloved President." The committee made several newspaper ads that promoted Nixon as president. Korff even held a three-day event of fasting and prayer on Nixon's behalf, and was active in raising money to help with Nixon's growing legal expenses. Korff also met with Nixon on August 6, 1974, in order to convince him not to resign from office. Nixon later stated that Korff "spoke with the fire of an Old Testament prophet" when he tried to convince Nixon to fight to stay in office. The rabbi told Nixon that "You will be sinning against history if you allow the partisan cabal in Congress and the jackals in the media to force you from office." After the president left office, Korff continued to visit him. He also established a trust fund to help pay off Nixon's legal fees, which totaled over $155,000. Korff retired from raising funds for Nixon in May 1975.

Many American Jews were embarrassed at Korff's behavior. However, he did receive support from Yitzhak Rabin and Golda Meir. Korff later admitted that what Nixon did in the Watergate Scandal was wrong, but continued to stand by him.

Korff met with Nixon on May 13, 1974, after which he wrote the book The Personal Nixon: Staying on the Summit. During spring of the same year, Nixon had referred to Korff as his rabbi.

== Later life ==
In 1983, Korff moved to Providence, Rhode Island, after taking a position as a consultant at Brown University. In his later years, he appeared as a panelist on the Sunday-morning show Confluence.

== Personal life ==
Korff married Naomi Ruth Sternburg on October 25, 1942. The couple had two children; however, they divorced in 1952. He was later married to Rebecca Marshall in the mid-1960s. They had one daughter named Zamira. This second marriage also ended in divorce.

Korff would die on July 26, 1995 due to pancreatic cancer.

Korff was the uncle of Grand Rabbi Yitzhak Aharon Korff.

== Works ==
- Flight from Fear (1953)
- The Personal Nixon: Staying on the Summit (1974)
- The President and I (1995)
