= Eliyahu Giladi =

Irgun and Lehi fighter (1915–1943)

- Native name: אליהו גלעדי
- Nickname: "Shaul"
- Born: Eliyahu Albert Grün; 1915; Bikafalva, Transylvania, Austria-Hungarian Empire
- Died: 17 August 1943 (aged 27–28) Rishon LeZion, Mandatory Palestine
- Cause of death: Execution by shooting
- Allegiance: Irgun (1937-1940); Lehi (1940-1943)

Eliyahu Giladi (Hebrew: אליהו גלעדי; 1915 – August 17, 1943) was a Lehi fighter from Transylvania. Giladi was executed in 1943 by his Lehi comrades after he entered into strong disagreements with Yitzhak Shamir and other members of the Lehi movement about how Lehi should act; Giladi was considered too extremist by Lehi's standards; in his memoirs, Shamir admitted in 1994 what had long been suspected: that the killing of Giladi in 1943 was ordered by Shamir himself, allegedly due to Giladi arguing for the assassination of David Ben-Gurion, and advocating for additional violent actions deemed to be too extremist by fellow Stern members.

== Early life ==
Eliyahu Giladi was born Eliyahu Albert Grün, in the village of Bikafalva in Transylvania, then part of the Austro-Hungarian Empire, into a family of ultra-Orthodox Jews. Eliyahu was the youngest of three sons of Moshe Grün and his wife, Rachel. He also had two sisters.

As a child, Eliyahu was sent to study at a yeshiva in the city of Satu Mare, but revolted and left his parents' house. He worked as a saddle apprentice and joined the Betar youth movement. After being recruited in the Romanian army, he deserted and fled to Hungary, hoping to emigrate to Mandatory Palestine. In Budapest, he contacted the leaders of the local revisionist Zionist movement, and with their help joined one of the groups of young people from the Betar organization who clandestinely emigrated to Mandatory Palestine in 1937. Meanwhile, his family also moved to Bucharest in 1938, later emigrating to Mandatory Palestine.

== Lehi movement ==
In Palestine, he adopted the Hebrew surname Giladi and joined Irgun, the underground paramilitary organization of the revisionist Zionists, under the leadership of David Raziel. Giladi became the head of the section of Irgun in Ness Ziona. When the Irgun split in 1940, Giladi became part of breakaway militant Zionist group named Lehi, led by Avraham Stern, which decided, despite England's declaration of war on Germany, to continue its actions against the British rule of Palestine.

Giladi was highlighted by his charisma and recklessness. Yitzhak Shamir was impressed at first by his personal qualities - imagination, boldness, courage and total lack of fear. The years of 1941-1942 were difficult for Lehi. Like most Lehi members, Giladi was caught by the British security services and imprisoned at a detention camp in Mazra'a. Several militants of the movement were killed by the British, including its commander, Avraham Stern, who was killed in Tel Aviv in February 1942. Only a small group of fighters remained free.

=== Conflict and violent denouncement ===
On September 2, 1942, Giladi and Shamir managed to escape arrest. They arrived at the house of Yerahmiel Aharonson, where they disguised themselves in new clothes and went incognito. Together with the other members, led by Yehoshua Cohen, Shamir and Giladi, they went on to reorganize the network. According to the testimony of Nathan Yellin-Mor and other Lehi members, from the spring of 1943 Giladi entered into sharp conflicts of ego and opinion with Shamir, and his behavior, which showed signs of imbalance, began to endanger the organization. He threatened his comrades, including Shamir, with a revolver, launched hasty and dangerous actions against the British Army personnel among the Jewish civilian population, allegedly proposing that members of the movement work as prostitutes. According to Yelin-Mor, Giladi seemed to be completely indifferent to human lives. Arie Perliger and Leonard Weinberg state that Giladi was assassinated because he wished to return to the Irgun.

According to Josef Heller, a researcher of the history of Lehi, Giladi could not bear to accept someone else's authority. When Shamir proposed that the organization get back on its feet through a training program, strengthening fighting capacity, and launching massive propaganda among the Jewish public, Giladi, who was competing to lead the movement, proposed self-financing by organizing rapid expropriations fundraising, such as the one he led at the Anglo-Palestinian Bank in September 1940, and supported the idea of assassinating the leaders of rival organizations - Irgun, Haganah and the Zionist parties, including David Ben-Gurion.

When Shamir overturned an order by Giladi which he considered particularly reckless, Giladi appeared at the house where Shamir was hiding and threatened to kill him with his revolver, in case he would cancel his orders again. In June 1943, one of Lehi's members committed suicide, believed to be due to pressure from Giladi.

Shamir was convinced that Giladi was endangering the existence of the organization and decided that there was no choice but to kill him. At that time, Lehi had great difficulty procuring weapons in Haifa and in the north. Giladi was commissioned to send a shipment of weapons by boats from the Zevulun naval school in northern Tel Aviv. On August 7, 1943, he was summoned to a meeting at this area, accompanied by two other Lehi fighters, Tzfoni Shomron and Yerahmiel Aharonson. On the way, they pulled out their revolvers and shot Giladi in the back and front. Then they buried him in an unknown location, according to one of the hypotheses, at a beach in Bat Yam.

After the execution, Shamir summoned thirteen members of Lehi to Bat Yam, and reported them on Giladi's deeds and execution. By a retroactive vote, the group unanimously approved the execution. Later, the detained Lehi members were also notified and approved the decision. The fighters closest to Giladi finally reconciled with his killing.

== Legacy ==
His name is immortalized in the Garden of the Missing in Action at Mount Herzl. At the end of September 1981, Member of Knesset Yossi Sarid addressed a question in the Knesset to Shamir, then the Minister of Foreign Affairs, and asked what the circumstances of Giladi's execution were. He submitted the query, following a request from Giladi's family. In the list of Lehi casualties, it is written: "Eliyahu Giladi (Shaul) - fell in tragic circumstances".

In the memorial page of Eliyahu Giladi from the Izkor site of the Israeli Ministry of Defense, it is written:

"Eliyahu Giladi was not convicted by his comrades of treason - he fell victim to the illegal fighting. 38 years after his execution (1981) his name was included in the list of those killed in the wars in Israel."
