= Eliyahu Bet-Zuri =

Member of Lehi

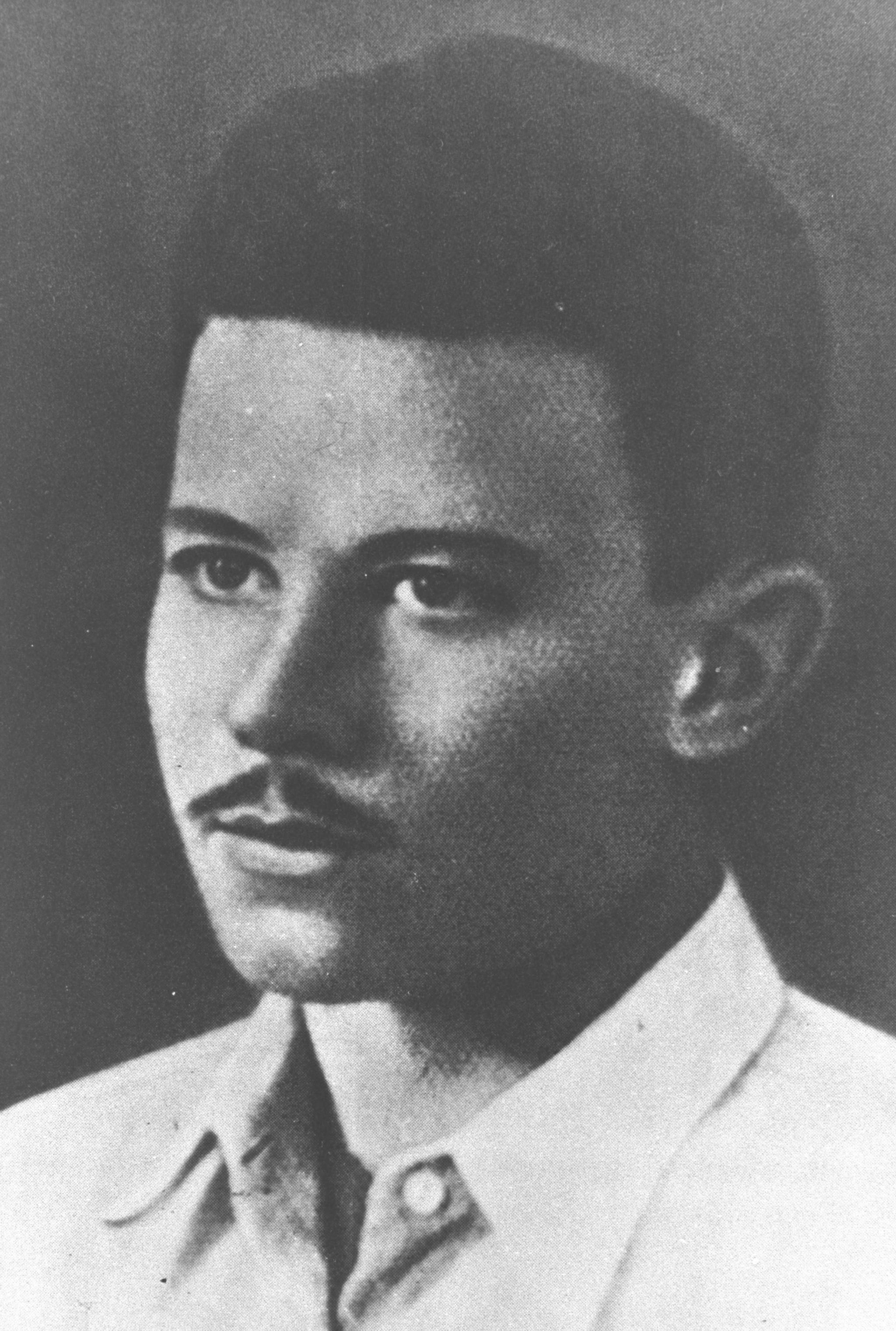
- Native name: אליהו בית צורי
- Born: February 10, 1922; Tel Aviv, Mandatory Palestine
- Died: March 22, 1945 (aged 23) Cairo, Kingdom of Egypt
- Cause of death: Execution by hanging
- Buried: Jerusalem
- Allegiance: Irgun; Lehi

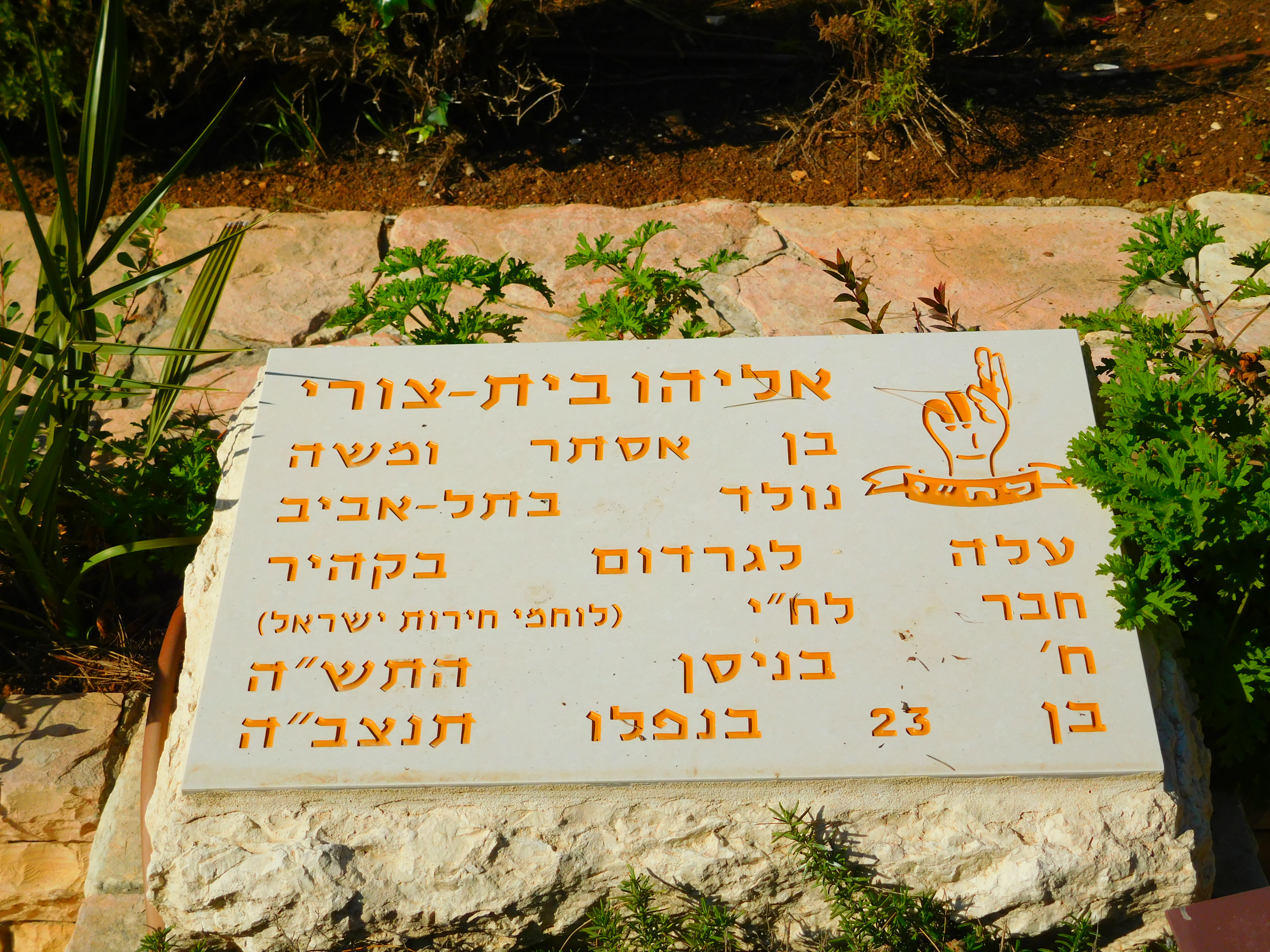
Grave of Bet-Zuri in Mount Herzl, Jerusalem, Israel. The hand in the upper-right hand corner is a Lehi symbol.

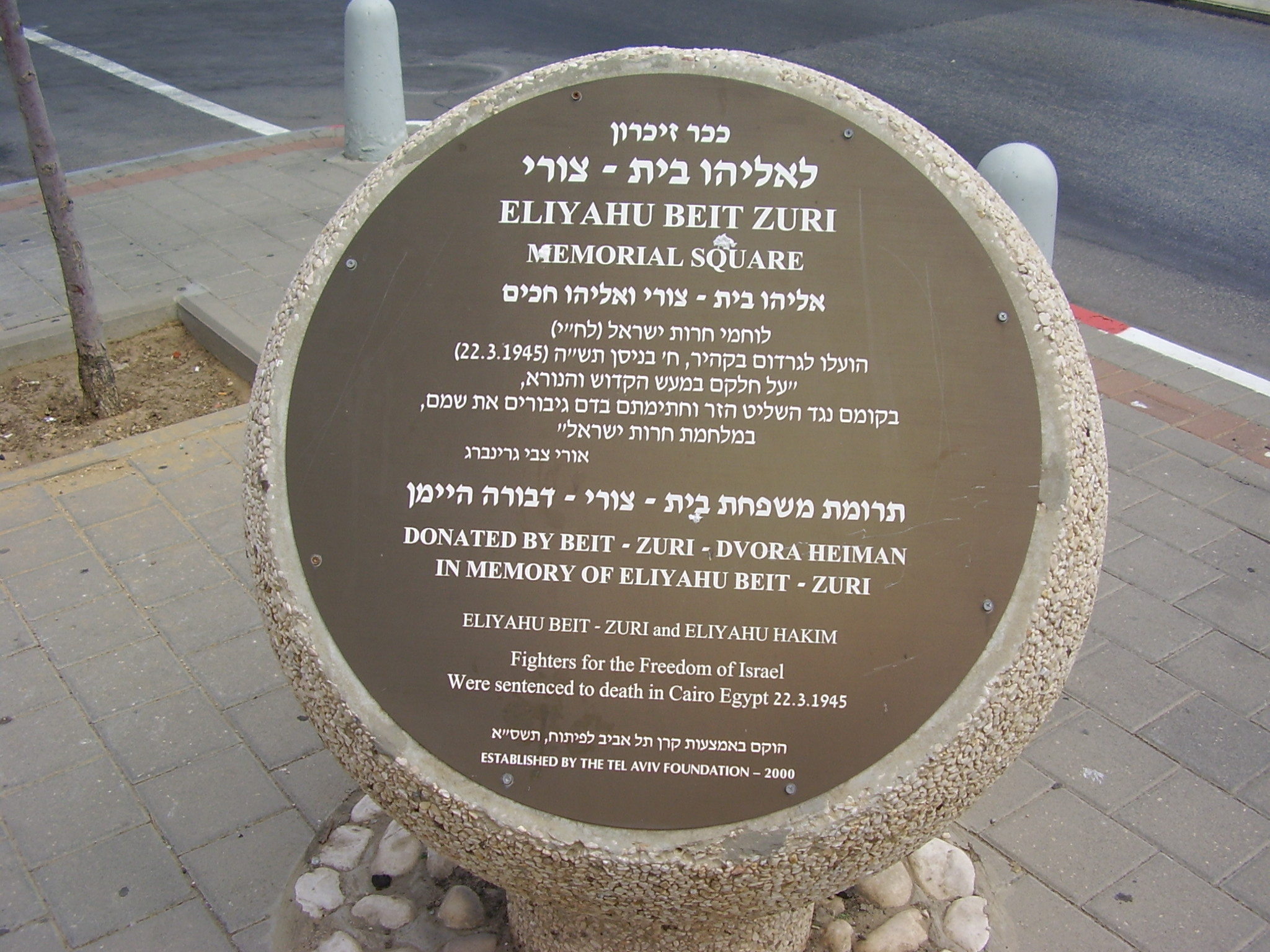
Plaque at Eliyahu Bet-Zuri Memorial Square in Tel Aviv

Eliyahu Bet-Zuri (Hebrew: אליהו בית צורי; February 10, 1922 – March 22, 1945) was a member of Lehi, who was executed in Egypt for his part in the assassination of Lord Moyne, the British Minister Resident in the Middle East.

== Biography ==
Bet-Zuri was born in Tel Aviv to Esther and Moshe Bet-Zuri. He was from a Mizrahi-Jewish family that had lived in Palestine for many generations. He had five siblings. His father was the Postmaster of Tiberias, a predominantly Jewish city with a significant Arab population, and was fluent in Arabic and Hebrew. As a child, he served as a runner for a Haganah detachment, carrying ammunition, messages, and rations between Haganah posts. Through his friend Uzzi Ornan, Bet-Zuri knew Uzzi's brother, the poet Yonatan Ratosh, and was influenced by his opinions. Bet-Zuri attended the Hebrew University of Jerusalem. He also joined the Irgun, but later left that movement to join the Lehi.

In 1944, Bet-Zuri suggested assassinating British Prime Minister Winston Churchill and other highly placed British political personalities, according to secret files not publicly released by MI5 until April 2011.

Bet-Zuri pressed his commanders to be sent on a planned mission to assassinate Lord Moyne in Cairo. Although he lacked operational experience, it was judged that his dedication and determination would compensate for it. He was sent to Cairo along with Eliyahu Hakim to carry out the assassination.

On November 6, 1944, Bet Zuri and Hakim carried out their plan. While Hakim fatally shot Moyne, Bet-Zuri shot and killed his army driver, Lance Corporal A.T. Fuller. They were caught trying to escape on bicycles and put on trial before a military court. At the trial, Bet-Zuri gave a decidedly nationalist speech, inspired by the Canaanite movement in Palestine:

"We do not recognize England's right to give us Palestine or take it away from us. Let me make clear to the court: My ideas are not Zionist ideas. We don't fight to uphold the Balfour Declaration. We don't fight for the sake of the National Home. We fight for our freedom. In our country a foreign power rules." Millions sank in the sea of blood and tears, but the British skipper did not lift them to the ship. And if a few of the survivors held on to the bow of the ship, he, the British skipper, pushed them back into the sea. And we in our homeland had no choice but to surrender or fight. We decided to fight.

He and Hakim were both sentenced to death. They were hanged in Cairo on March 22, 1945, singing Hatikvah, the song which would become the Israeli anthem, from the gallows.

Twenty-seven years later, Yitzhak Shamir, who, as their Lehi commander, had dispatched them on their mission, lobbied Yitzhak Rabin's Labour Government to obtain their bodies as part of an exchange of prisoners between Egypt and Israel after the Yom Kippur War. On June 25, 1975, Egypt duly gave their remains to Israel in exchange for 20-25 Arab prisoners of war held in Israel. They were interred on Mount Herzl with full military honours. The Ministry of Education supplied all Israeli schools with brochures explaining their acts and motives.

== See also ==
- Eliyahu Hakim
- Olei Hagardom
