= Lehi bombing of Haifa police station =

1947 car bombing attack

- Part of Jewish insurgency in Mandatory Palestine
- Location: Haifa police station, Haifa, Mandatory Palestine
- Date: January 12, 1947
- Deaths: 4 killed
- Injuries: 142 injured
- Perpetrator: Lehi

On January 12, 1947, the Lehi, a Zionist paramilitary group, bombed the British police station in Haifa, Mandatory Palestine with a truck laden with explosives. It has been described as the first car bombing or truck bombing "fully conceptualized as a weapon of urban warfare." The attack killed 4 and injured 142, and it ended a truce in Mandatory Palestine.

== History ==
The attack occurred during the Jewish insurgency in Mandatory Palestine.
