= Eliyahu Hakim =

Lehi militant and assassin (1925–1945)

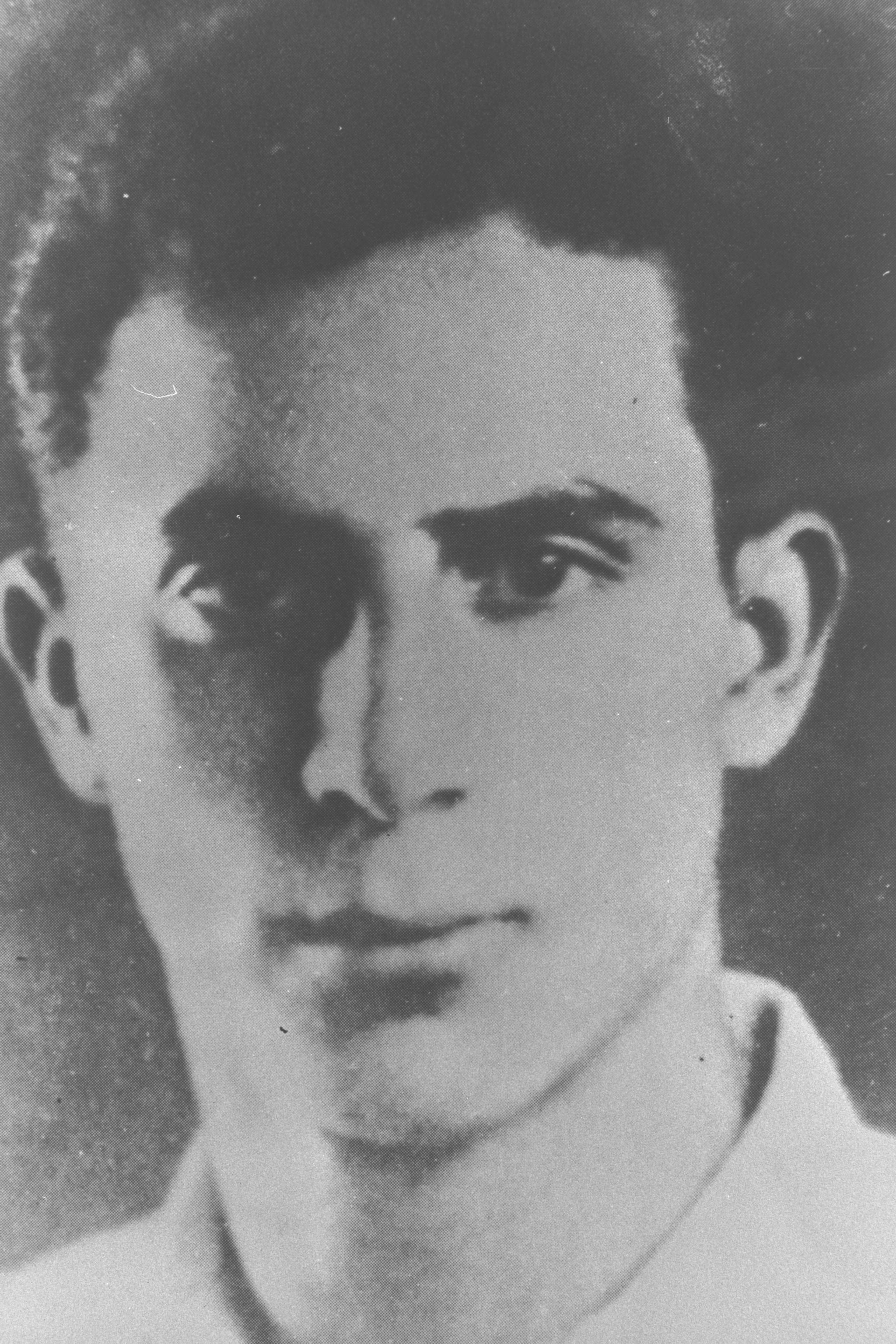
- Native name: אליהו חכים
- Born: January 2, 1925; Beirut, Mandate for Syria and the Lebanon
- Died: March 22, 1945 (aged 20) Cairo, Kingdom of Egypt
- Cause of death: Execution by hanging
- Buried: Jerusalem
- Allegiance: Lehi

Eliyahu Hakim (Hebrew: אליהו חכים; January 2, 1925 – March 22, 1945) was a Lehi member, known for participating in the 1944 assassination of Lord Moyne, the British Minister Resident in the Middle East. Hakim fired the fatal shots at Moyne.

== Biography ==
Born in Beirut, Mandate for Syria and the Lebanon to a Lebanese-Jewish family, Hakim moved to Mandatory Palestine with his family when he was seven. He grew up in the port city of Haifa.

As a teenager, he joined Lehi, and then volunteered for the British Army during World War II. Posted to Cairo, Hakim deserted in order to continue his anti-British activities on behalf of Lehi.

As a member of Lehi, he participated in an assassination attempt against Harold MacMichael, the British High Commissioner for Palestine, in 1944. His team ambushed MacMichael's car, slightly wounding him and his driver and severely wounding his adjutant, but failing to kill anyone.

== Assassination of Lord Moyne ==
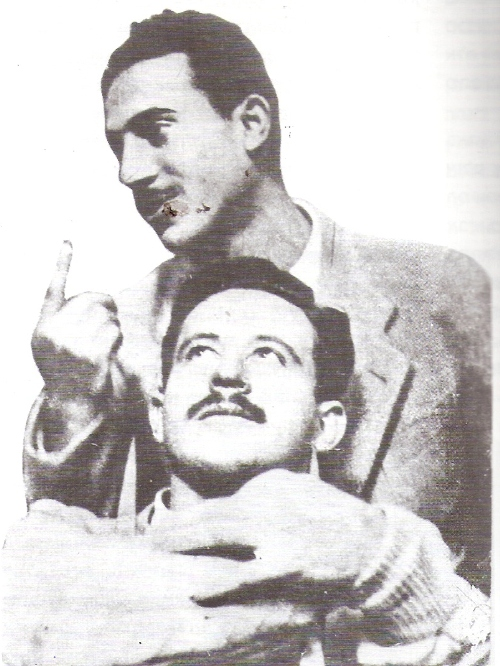
Hakim and Bet-Zuri

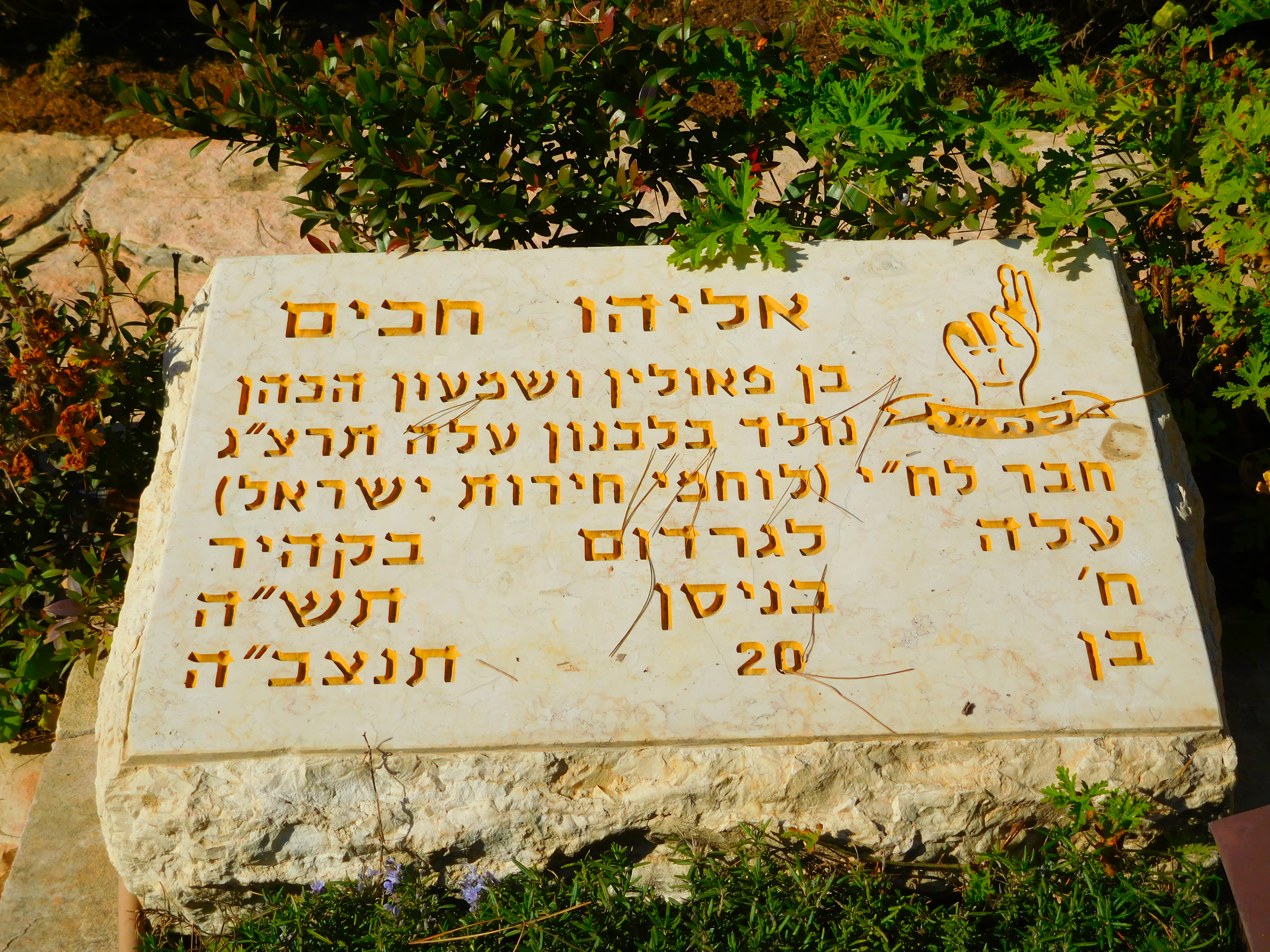
Grave of Eliyahu Hakim, with the Lehi symbol in the upper-right-hand corner

On November 6, 1944, Hakim, along with Eliyahu Bet-Zuri carried out the assassination of Lord Moyne in Cairo.

Moyne arrived in his car with his army driver, Lance Corporal A. Fuller, his secretary, Dorothy Osmond, and his ADC, Major Andrew Hughes-Onslow. The ADC went to open the front door of the residence and the driver got out to open the door for Moyne. Hakim then pulled the car door open and shot Moyne three times, while Bet-Zuri shot and killed the driver. The two assassins fled on their bicycles, pursued by an Egyptian motorcycle policeman who had been alerted by Major Hughes-Onslow. The two were captured and surrounded by an angry mob until they were extracted by the police. Moyne, seriously wounded, was rushed to hospital and died of his wounds that evening.

Hakim and Bet-Zuri were caught immediately and put on trial before a military court. They were convicted of murder and sentenced to death. Both were hanged in Cairo on March 22, 1945, singing Hatikvah, the Zionist anthem, on the gallows.

== Legacy ==
Hakim and Bet-Zuri's remains were brought to Israel in 1975 and reburied on Mount Herzl with full military honors.

Streets named after Hakim are located in all Israeli main cities: French Carmel neighborhood of Haifa, Northern Tel-Aviv, Jerusalem and Be'er Sheba.
