= Lehi (militant group) =

Zionist paramilitary organization (1940–1948)

Fighters for the Freedom of Israel
- לוחמי חרות ישראל
- The Lehi salute, with two raised fingers in the right hand to represent the "If I forget thee / O Jerusalem...may my right hand forget its skill." (Ps. 137:5) pledge. The acronym "Lehi" is written below the hand.
- Other name: Stern Gang; Lehi
- Leader: Avraham Stern (Note: After Stern's murder in February 1942, Nathan Yellin-Mor became a member of the Lehi's guiding triumvirate, with Israel Eldad as chief of Lehi's propaganda and Yitzhak Shamir as chief of operations.)
- Founded: 1940; 86 years ago
- Dissolved: 1948; 78 years ago
- Split from: Irgun
- Newspaper: Hamaas (weekly) (Note: Other publications by the Lehi included the daily Mivrak, the monthly HeHahzit, and BaMahteret.)
- Active regions: Mandatory Palestine
- Ideology: Ultranationalism; Revisionist Zionism; Anti-imperialism; Anti-British sentiment; Anti-Arab sentiment From 1944: National Bolshevism
- Political position: Syncretic
- Anthem: Hayalim Almonim חַיָּלִים אַלְמוֹנִים (lit. 'Unknown Soldiers')
- Size: approx. 300 members
- Part of: Jewish Resistance Movement

Lehi (Hebrew pronunciation: [ˈleχi]; Hebrew: לח״י, sometimes abbreviated "LHI"), officially the Fighters for the Freedom of Israel (Hebrew: לוחמי חרות ישראל, romanized: Lohamei Herut Israel) and often known pejoratively as the Stern Gang, was a Zionist paramilitary militant organization founded by Avraham Stern in Mandatory Palestine in 1940. Its avowed aim was to evict the British authorities from Palestine by use of violence, allowing unrestricted immigration of Jews and the formation of a Jewish state. It was initially called the National Military Organization in Israel upon being founded in August 1940, and considered its actions as necessary for achieving its national aims.

Lehi split from the Irgun militant group in 1940 in order to continue fighting the British during World War II. It initially sought an alliance with Fascist Italy and Nazi Germany. Believing that Nazi Germany was a lesser enemy of the Jews than Britain, Lehi twice attempted to form an alliance with the Nazis, proposing a Jewish state based on "nationalist and totalitarian principles, and linked to the German Reich by an alliance". After Stern's death in 1942, the new leadership of Lehi began to move towards support for Joseph Stalin's Soviet Union and the ideology of National Bolshevism, which was considered an amalgamation of both right and left. Regarding themselves as "revolutionary Socialists", the new Lehi developed a highly original ideology combining an "almost mystical" belief in Greater Israel with support for the Arab liberation struggle. This sophisticated ideology failed to gain public support and Lehi fared poorly in the first Israeli elections.

In April 1948, Lehi and the Irgun were jointly responsible for the massacre in Deir Yassin of at least 107 Palestinian Arab villagers, including women and children. Lehi assassinated Lord Moyne, British Minister Resident in the Middle East, and made many other attacks on the British in Palestine. It also carried out attacks in the United Kingdom. On 29 May 1948, the government of Israel, having inducted the group's activist members into the Israel Defence Forces, formally disbanded Lehi, though some of its members carried out one final terrorist act, the assassination of Swedish diplomat Folke Bernadotte some months later, an act condemned by Bernadotte's replacement as mediator, Ralph Bunche. After the assassination, the new Israeli government declared Lehi a terrorist organization, arresting some 200 members and convicting some of the leaders. However, several months later, just before the first Israeli elections in January 1949, the government granted all Lehi prisoners amnesty under a state general order of pardon, and they were released. In 1980, Israel instituted a military decoration, an "award for activity in the struggle for the establishment of Israel", the Lehi ribbon. Former Lehi leader Yitzhak Shamir became Prime Minister of Israel in 1983.

== Founding of Lehi ==
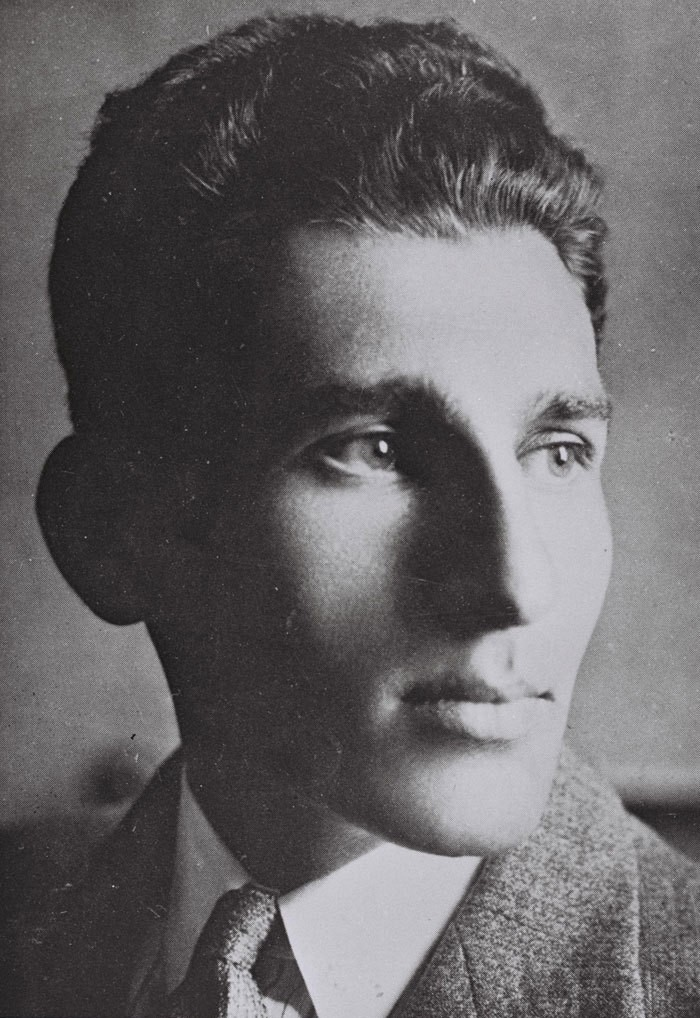
Avraham Stern

Lehi was created in August 1940 by Avraham Stern. Stern had been a member of the Irgun (Irgun Tsvai Leumi – "National Military Organization") high command. Zeev Jabotinsky, then the Irgun's supreme commander, had decided that diplomacy and working with Britain would best serve the Zionist cause. World War II was in progress, and Britain was fighting Nazi Germany. The Irgun suspended its underground military activities against the British for the duration of the war.

Stern argued that the time for Zionist diplomacy was over and that it was time for an armed struggle against the British. Like other Zionists, he objected to the White Paper of 1939, which restricted both Jewish immigration and Jewish land purchases in Palestine. For Stern, "no difference existed between Hitler and Chamberlain, between Dachau or Buchenwald and sealing the gates of Eretz Israel."

Stern wanted to open Palestine to all Jewish refugees from Europe and considered this to be the most important issue of the day. Britain would not allow this. Therefore, he concluded, the Yishuv (Jews of Palestine) should fight the British rather than support them in the war. When the Irgun made a truce with the British, Stern left the Irgun to form his own group, which he called Irgun Tsvai Leumi B'Yisrael ("National Military Organization in Israel"), later Lohamei Herut Israel ("Fighters for the Freedom of Israel"). In September 1940, the organization was officially named "Lehi", the Hebrew acronym of the latter name.

Stern and his followers believed that dying for the "foreign occupier" who was obstructing the creation of the Jewish State was useless. They differentiated between "enemies of the Jewish people" (the British) and "Jew haters" (the Nazis), believing that the former needed to be defeated and the latter manipulated.

In 1940, the idea of the Final Solution was still "unthinkable", and Stern believed that Hitler wanted to make Germany judenrein through emigration, as opposed to extermination. In December 1940, Lehi contacted Germany with a proposal to aid German conquest in the Middle East in return for recognition of a Jewish state open to unlimited immigration.

== Goals and ideology ==
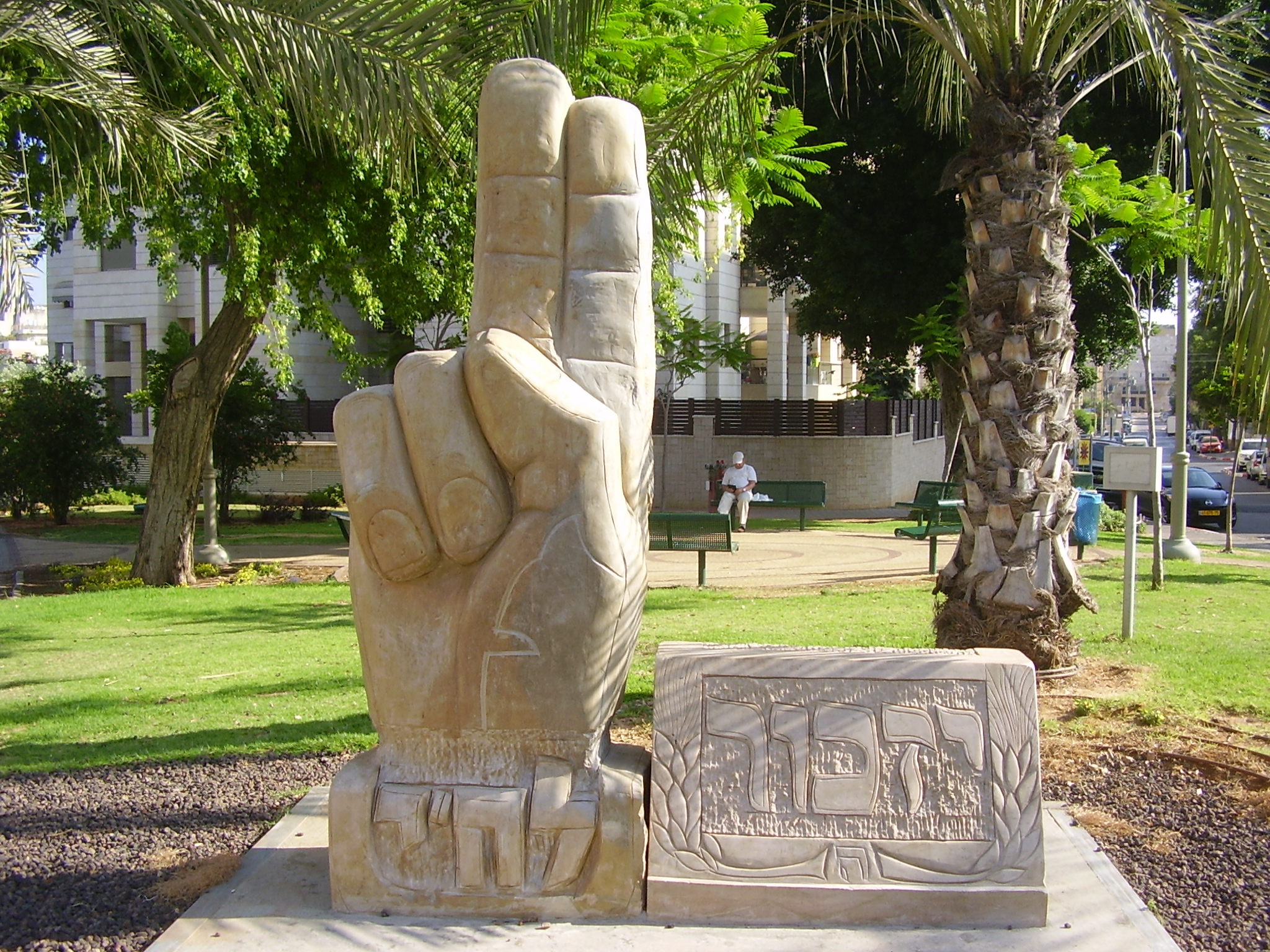
Lehi commemoration in Petah Tikva. Half-clenched fist, in reference to Psalms 137:5.

Lehi had three main goals:

- To bring together all those interested in liberation (that is, those willing to join in active fighting against the British).
- To appear before the world as the only active Jewish military organization.
- To take over Eretz Yisrael (the Land of Israel) by armed force.

Lehi believed in its early years that its goals would be achieved by finding a strong international ally that would expel the British from Palestine, in return for Jewish military help; this would require the creation of a broad and organised military force "demonstrating its desire for freedom through military operations."

Lehi also referred to themselves as 'terrorists' and may have been one of the last organizations to do so.

An article titled "Terror" in the Lehi underground newspaper He Khazit (The Front) argued as follows:

Neither Jewish ethics nor Jewish tradition can disqualify terrorism as a means of combat. We are very far from having any moral qualms as far as our national war goes. We have before us the command of the Torah, whose morality surpasses that of any other body of laws in the world: "Ye shall blot them out to the last man."

But first and foremost, terrorism is for us a part of the political battle being conducted under the present circumstances, and it has a great part to play: speaking in a clear voice to the whole world, as well as to our wretched brethren outside this land, it proclaims our war against the occupier.

We are particularly far from this sort of hesitation in regard to an enemy whose moral perversion is admitted by all.

The article described the goals of terror:

- It demonstrates ... against the true terrorist who hides behind his piles of papers and the laws he has legislated.
- It is not directed against people, it is directed against representatives. Therefore it is effective.
- If it also shakes the Yishuv from their complacency, good and well.

Yitzhak Shamir, one of the three leaders of Lehi after Avraham Stern's assassination, argued for the legitimacy of Lehi's actions:

There are those who say that to kill Martin (Note: T.G. Martin was a British police sergeant who had previously arrested Shamir and who was assassinated by Lehi in retaliation.) is terrorism, but to attack an army camp is guerrilla warfare and to bomb civilians is professional warfare. But I think it is the same from the moral point of view. Is it better to drop an atomic bomb on a city than to kill a handful of persons? I don't think so. But nobody says that President Truman was a terrorist. All the men we went for individually – Wilkin, Martin, MacMichael and others – were personally interested in succeeding in the fight against us.

So it was more efficient and more moral to go for selected targets. In any case, it was the only way we could operate, because we were so small. For us it was not a question of the professional honour of a soldier, it was the question of an idea, an aim that had to be achieved. We were aiming at a political goal. There are many examples of what we did to be found in the Bible – Gideon and Samson, for instance. This had an influence on our thinking. And we also learned from the history of other peoples who fought for their freedom – the Russian and Irish revolutionaries, Giuseppe Garibaldi and Josip Broz Tito.

=== Relationship with fascism and socialism ===
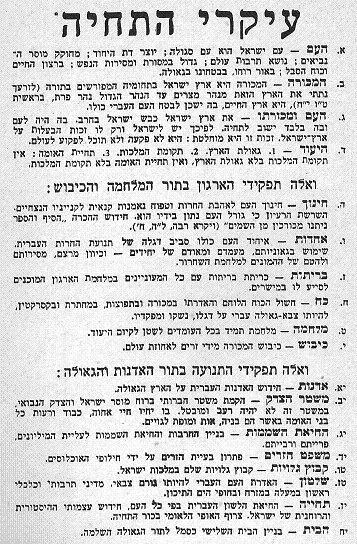
The 18 Principles of Rebirth, the ideology of Lehi as laid out by Avraham Stern, notes the need to "solve the problem" of the "alien population".

Unlike the left-wing Haganah and right-wing Irgun, Lehi members were not a homogeneous collective with a single political, religious, or economic ideology. They were a combination of militants united by the goal of liberating the land of Israel from British rule. Most Lehi leaders defined their organization as an anti-imperialist movement and stated that their opposition to British colonial rule in Palestine was not based on a particular policy but rather on the presence of a foreign power over the homeland of the Jewish people.

Avraham Stern defined the British Mandate as "foreign rule" regardless of British policies and took a radical position against such imperialism even if it were to be benevolent. In a pamphlet entitled 18 Principles of Rebirth, Stern noted the need to "solve the problem" of the "alien population" and called for the 'conquest' of Palestine. It also emphasized the need to gather the Jewish Diaspora into a new sovereign state, revive the Hebrew language as a spoken language, and build a Third Temple as a symbol of the 'new era'.

In the early years of the state of Israel, Lehi veterans could be found supporting nearly all political parties and some Lehi leaders founded a left-wing political party called the Fighters' List with Natan Yellin-Mor as its head. The party took part in the elections in January 1949 and won a single parliamentary seat. A number of Lehi veterans established the Semitic Action movement in 1956 which sought the creation of a regional federation encompassing Israel and its Arab neighbours on the basis of an anti-colonialist alliance with other indigenous inhabitants of the Middle East.

Some writers have stated that Lehi's true goals were the creation of a totalitarian state. Perliger and Weinberg write that the organisation's ideology placed "its world view in the quasi-fascist radical Right, which is characterised by xenophobia, a national egotism that completely subordinates the individual to the needs of the nation, anti-liberalism, total denial of democracy and a highly centralised government." Perliger and Weinberg state that most Lehi members were admirers of the Italian Fascist movement. According to Kaplan and Penslar, Lehi's ideology was a mix of fascist and communist thought combined with racism and universalism.

=== Political racism ===
According to Yaacov Shavit, professor at the Department of Jewish History, Tel Aviv University, articles in Lehi publications contained references to a Jewish "master race", contrasting the Jews with Arabs who were seen as a "nation of slaves". American journalist Sasha Polakow-Suransky writes that "Lehi was also unabashedly racist towards Arabs. Their publications described Jews as a master race and Arabs as a slave race." Lehi advocated mass expulsion of all Arabs from Palestine and Transjordan, or even their physical annihilation.

In contrast, a number of Lehi veterans, including co-leader Nathan Yellin-Mor, went on to establish the Semitic Action movement which sought the creation of a regional federation encompassing Israel and its Arab neighbours on the basis of an anti-colonialist alliance with other indigenous inhabitants of the Middle East. Yaakov Yardaur, another former Lehi militant, was a strong advocate for equal rights for Arab citizens of Israel.

== Evolution, tactics and organization ==
Many Lehi combatants had received military training. Some had attended the Military Engineers School in Civitavecchia, in Fascist Italy. Others received military training from instructors of the Polish Armed Forces in 1938–1939. This training was conducted in Trochenbrod (Zofiówka) in Wołyń Voivodeship, Podębin near Łódź, and the forests around Andrychów. They were taught how to use explosives. One of them reported later: "Poles treated terrorism as a science. We have mastered mathematical principles of demolishing constructions made of concrete, iron, wood, bricks and dirt."

The group was initially unsuccessful. Early attempts to raise funds through criminal activities, including a bank robbery in Tel Aviv in 1940 and another robbery on 9 January 1942 in which Jewish passers-by were killed, brought about the temporary collapse of the group. An attempt to assassinate the head of the British secret police in Lod in which three police personnel were killed, two Jewish and one British, elicited a severe response from the British and Jewish establishments who collaborated against Lehi.

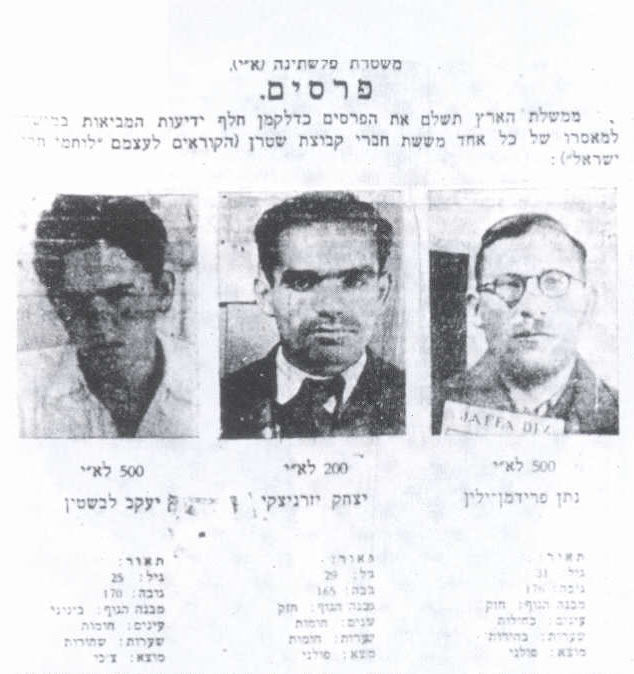
Wanted Poster of the Palestine Police Force offering rewards for the capture of Stern Gang members: Jaacov Levstein (Eliav), Yitzhak Yezernitzky (Shamir), and Natan Friedman-Yelin

Stern's group was seen as a terrorist organisation by the British authorities, who instructed the Defence Security Office (the colonial branch of MI5) to track down its leaders. In 1942, Stern, after he was arrested, was shot dead in disputed circumstances by Inspector Geoffrey J. Morton of the CID. The arrest of several other members led momentarily to the group's eclipse, until it was revived after the September 1942 escape of two of its leaders, Yitzhak Shamir and Eliyahu Giladi, aided by two other escapees Natan Yellin-Mor (Friedman) and Israel Eldad (Sheib). (Giladi was later killed by Lehi under circumstances that remain mysterious.) Shamir's codename was "Michael", a reference to one of Shamir's heroes, Michael Collins. Lehi was guided by spiritual and philosophical leaders such as Uri Zvi Greenberg and Israel Eldad. After the killing of Giladi, the organization was led by a triumvirate of Eldad, Shamir, and Yellin-Mor.

Lehi adopted a non-socialist platform of anti-imperialist ideology. It viewed the continued British rule of Palestine as a violation of the Mandate's provision generally, and its restrictions on Jewish immigration to be an intolerable breach of international law. However they also targeted Jews whom they regarded as traitors, and during the 1948 Arab-Israeli War they joined in operations with the Haganah and Irgun against Arab targets, for example Deir Yassin.

According to a compilation by Nachman Ben-Yehuda, Lehi was responsible for 42 assassinations, more than twice as many as the Irgun and Haganah combined during the same period. Of those Lehi assassinations that Ben-Yehuda classified as political, more than half the victims were Jews.

Lehi also rejected the authority of the Jewish Agency for Israel and related organizations, operating entirely on its own throughout nearly all of its existence.

Lehi prisoners captured by the British generally refused to employ lawyers in their defence. The defendants would conduct their own defence, and would deny the right of the military court to try them, saying that in accordance with the Hague Convention they should be accorded the status of prisoners of war. For the same reason, Lehi prisoners refused to plead for amnesty, even when it was clear that this would have spared them the death penalty. Moshe Barazani, a Lehi member, and Meir Feinstein, an Irgun member, took their own lives in prison with a grenade smuggled inside an orange so the British could not hang them.

== Activities and operations during World War II ==
=== Wartime contacts with Italy and Nazi Germany ===
==== Italy ====
In mid-1940, Stern became convinced that the Italians were interested in the establishment of a fascist Jewish state in Palestine. He conducted negotiations, he thought, with the Italians via an intermediary Moshe Rotstein, and drew up a document that became known as the "Jerusalem Agreement". In exchange for Italy's recognition of, and aid in obtaining, Jewish sovereignty over Palestine, Stern promised that Zionism would come under the aegis of Italian fascism, with Haifa as its base, and the Old City of Jerusalem under Vatican control, except for the Jewish quarter. In Heller's words, Stern's proposal would "turn the 'Kingdom of Israel' into a satellite of the Axis powers."

However, the "intermediary" Rotstein was in fact an agent of the Irgun, conducting a sting operation under the direction of the Irgun intelligence leader in Haifa, Israel Pritzker, in cooperation with the British. Secret British documents about the affair were uncovered by historian Eldad Harouvi (now director of the Palmach Archives) and confirmed by former Irgun intelligence officer Yitzhak Berman. When Rotstein's role later became clear, Lehi sentenced him to death and assigned Yaacov Eliav to kill him, but the assassination never took place. However, Pritzker was killed by Lehi in 1943.

==== Nazi Germany ====
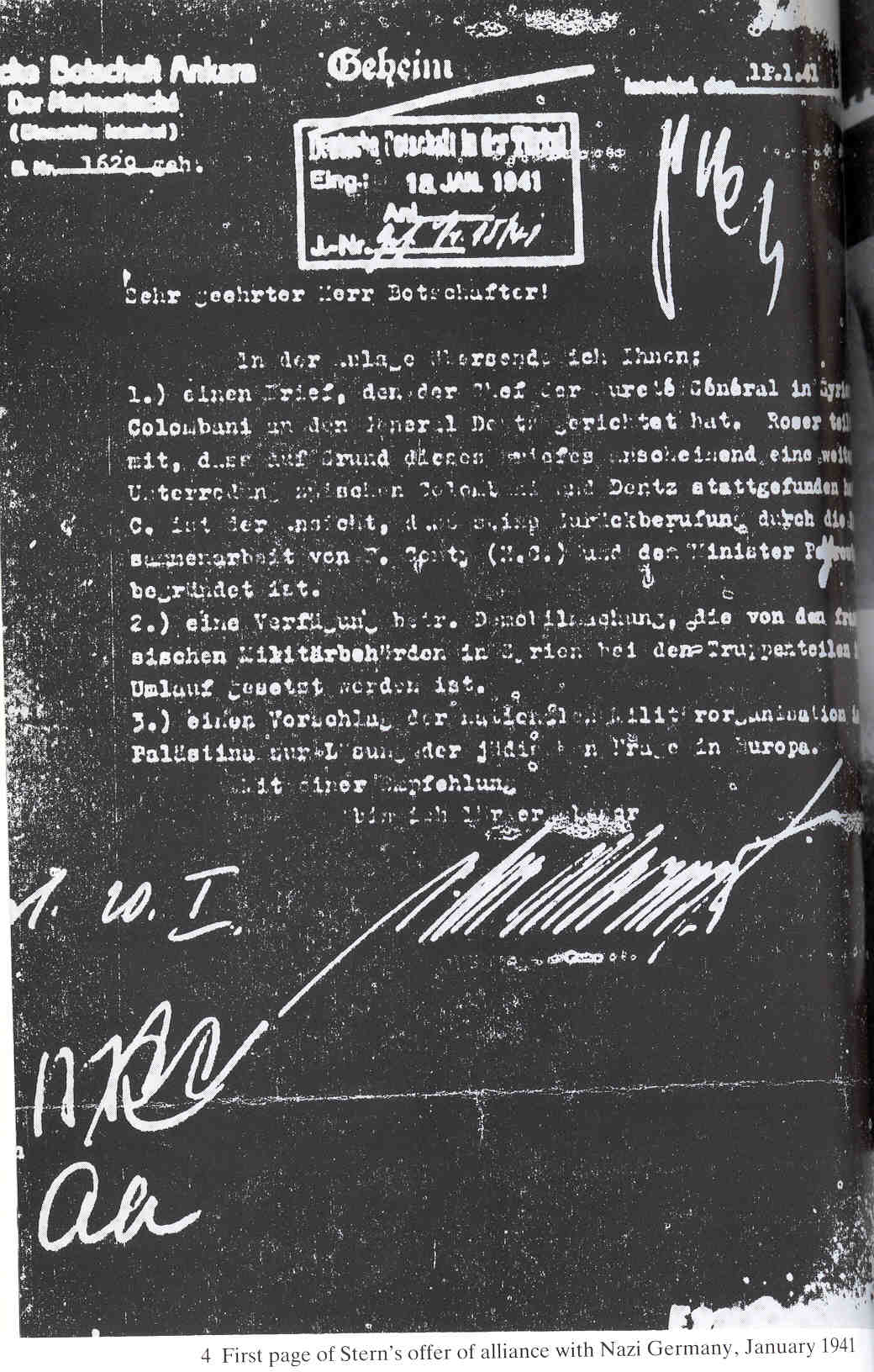
German cover letter from 11 January 1941 attached to a description of an offer for an alliance with Nazi Germany attributed to Lehi.

Late in 1940, Lehi, having identified a common interest between the intentions of the new German order and Jewish national aspirations, proposed forming an alliance in World War II with Nazi Germany. The organization offered cooperation in the following terms: Lehi would rebel against the British, while Germany would recognize an independent Jewish state in Palestine/Eretz Israel, and all Jews leaving their homes in Europe, by their own will or because of government injunctions, could enter Palestine with no restriction of numbers. Late in 1940, Lehi representative Naftali Lubenchik went to Beirut to meet German official Werner Otto von Hentig. The Lehi documents outlined that its rule would be authoritarian and indicated similarities between the organization and Nazis. Israel Eldad, one of the leading members of Lehi, wrote about Hitler "it is not Hitler who is the hater of the kingdom of Israel and the return to Zion, it is not Hitler who subjects us to the cruel fate of falling a second and a third time into Hitler's hands, but the British."

Stern also proposed recruiting 40,000 Jews from occupied Europe to invade Palestine with German support to oust the British. On 11 January 1941, Vice Admiral Ralf von der Marwitz, the German naval attaché in Turkey, filed a report (the "Ankara document") conveying an offer by Lehi to "actively take part in the war on Germany's side" in return for German support for "the establishment of the historic Jewish state on a national and totalitarian basis, bound by a treaty with the German Reich."

According to Yellin-Mor:

Lubenchik did not take along any written memorandum for the German representatives. Had there been a need for one, he would have formulated it on the spot, since he was familiar with the episode of the Italian "intermediary" and with the numerous drafts connected with it. Apparently one of von Hentig's secretaries noted down the essence of the proposal in his own words.

According to Joseph Heller, "The memorandum arising from their conversation is an entirely authentic document, on which the stamp of the 'IZL in Israel' is clearly embossed." Von der Marwitz delivered the offer, classified as secret, to the German Ambassador in Turkey and on 21 January 1941 it was sent to Berlin. There was never any response. A second attempt to contact the Nazis was made at the end of 1941, but it was even less successful. The emissary Yellin-Mor was arrested in Syria before he could carry out his mission.

This proposed alliance with Nazi Germany cost Lehi and Stern much support. The Stern Gang also had links with, and support from, the Vichy France Sûreté's Lebanese offices. Even as the full scale of Nazi atrocities became more evident in 1943, Lehi refused to accept Hitler as the main foe (as opposed to Great Britain).

In 1942, a Lehi member named Efraim Zetler was kidnapped and interrogated by the Haganah. According to transcripts released by Israel's state archives in 2023, during the interrogations, Zetler said that Nazi Germany was not the "enemy of the Jews" and ready to receive assistance from them, stating:

"We will communicate with any military power ready to help with the establishment of the Kingdom of Israel, even if it's Germany. The only condition is that we get weapons, so we can rebel against the English. If Germany agrees to help us fight enemy number 1, the English, we'll team up with it. It’s not an enemy of the Jews in Israel."

=== Assassination of Lord Moyne ===
On 6 November 1944, Lehi assassinated Lord Moyne, the British Minister Resident in the Middle East, in Cairo. Moyne was the highest ranking British official in the region. Yitzhak Shamir claimed later that Moyne was assassinated because of his support for a Middle Eastern Arab Federation and anti-Semitic lectures in which Arabs were held to be racially superior to Jews. The assassination rocked the British government, and outraged Winston Churchill, the British Prime Minister. The two assassins, Eliyahu Bet-Zuri and Eliyahu Hakim were captured and used their trial as a platform to make public their political propaganda. They were both found guilty and executed. In 1975, their bodies were returned to Israel, with Egypt exchanging them for 20 Arab prisoners, and given a state funeral. In 1982, postage stamps were issued for 20 Olei Hagardom, including Bet-Zouri and Hakim, in a souvenir sheet called "Martyrs of the struggle for Israel's independence."

After Moyne's assassination, a member of Lehi who was arrested shortly after named Rafael Sawovsky told interrogators that an assassination plan against Churchill was proposed by Lehi members, according to MI5 files released by The National Archives in 2011.

== Post war terrorist campaign and insurgency ==
As a group that never had more than a few hundred members, Lehi relied on audacious but small-scale operations to drive its message home. They adopted the tactics of groups such as the Socialist Revolutionaries and the Combat Organization of the Polish Socialist Party in Czarist Russia, and the Irish Republican Army. To this end, Lehi conducted small-scale operations such as individual assassinations of British officials (notable targets included Lord Moyne, CID detectives, and Jewish "collaborators"), and random shootings against soldiers and police officers. Another strategy, adopted in 1946, was to send bombs in the mail to British politicians. Other actions included sabotaging infrastructure targets: bridges, railroads, telephone and telegraph lines, and oil refineries, as well as the use of vehicle bombs against British military, police, and administrative targets. Lehi financed its operations from private donations, extortion, and bank robbery. Its campaign of violence lasted from 1944 to 1948. Initially conducted together with the Irgun, it included a six-month suspension to avoid being targeted by the Haganah during the Hunting Season, and later operated jointly with the Haganah and Irgun under the Jewish Resistance Movement. After the Jewish Resistance Movement was dissolved, it operated independently as part of the general Jewish insurgency in Palestine.

=== Tel Aviv car park raid ===
On 25 April 1946, a Lehi unit attacked a car park in Tel Aviv occupied by the British 6th Airborne Division. Under a barrage of heavy covering fire, Lehi fighters broke into the car park, shot soldiers they encountered at close range, stole rifles from arms racks, laid mines to cover the retreat, and withdrew. Seven soldiers were killed in the attack, which caused widespread outrage among the British security forces in Palestine. It resulted in retaliatory anti-Jewish violence by British troops and a punitive curfew imposed on Tel Aviv's roads and the closure of places of entertainment in the city by the British Army.

=== British police station in Haifa ===
On 12 January 1947, Lehi members drove a truckload of explosives into a British police station in Haifa, killing four and injuring 140, in what has been called 'the world's first true truck bomb'.

=== Operations in Europe ===
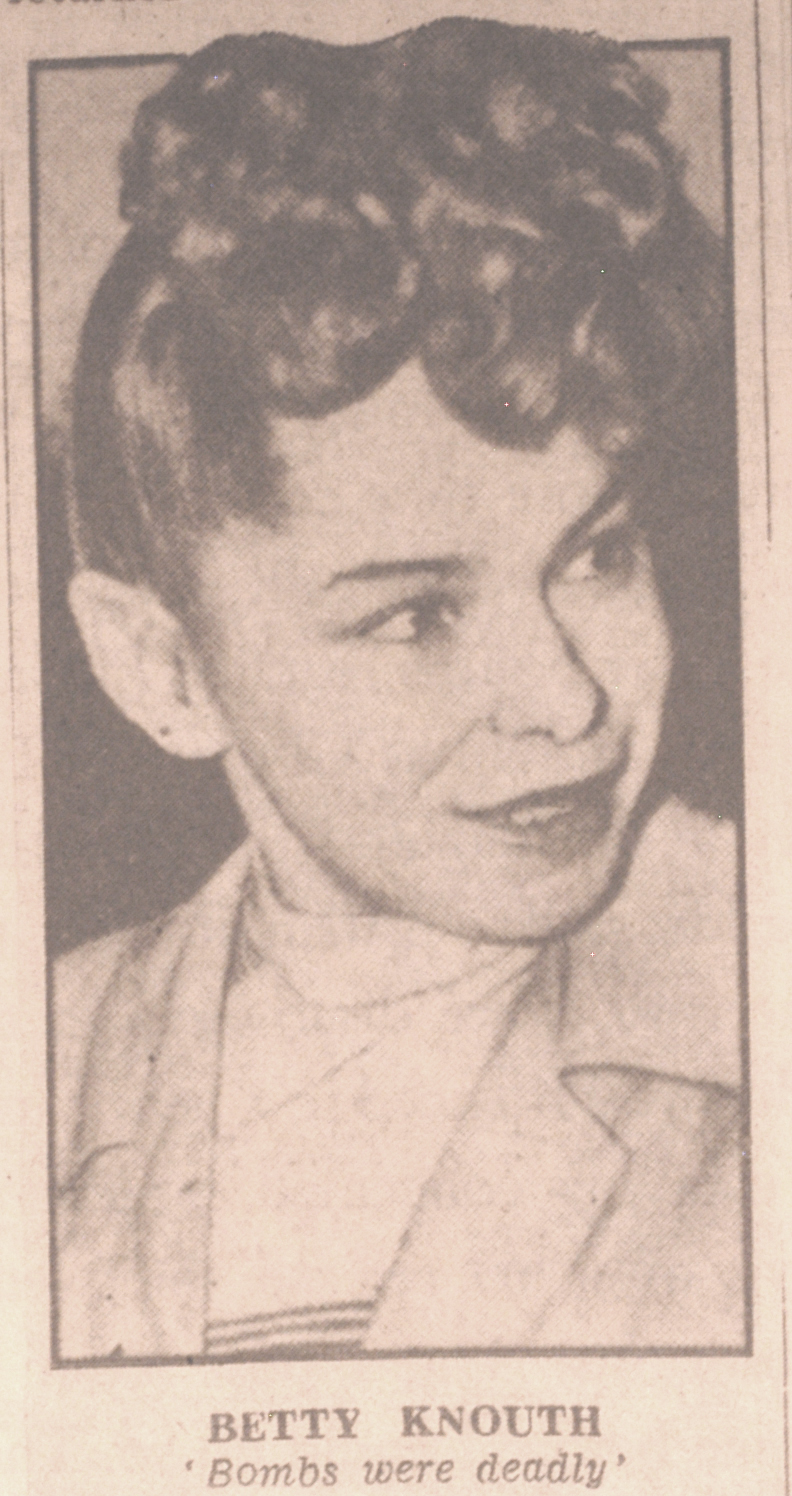
Betty Knouth, Tel Aviv, 24 August 1948

Following the bombing of the British embassy in Rome, in October 1946, a series of operations against targets in the United Kingdom were launched. On 7 March 1947, Lehi's only successful operation in Britain was carried out when a Lehi bomb severely damaged the British Colonial Club, a London recreational facility for soldiers and students from Britain's colonies in Africa and the West Indies. On 15 April 1947 a bomb consisting of twenty-four sticks of explosives was planted in the Colonial Office, Whitehall. It failed to explode due to a fault in the timer. Five weeks later, on 22 May, five alleged Lehi members were arrested in Paris with bomb making material including explosives of the same type as found in London. On 2 June, two Lehi members, Betty Knouth and Yaakov Levstein, were arrested crossing from Belgium to France. Envelopes addressed to British officials, with detonators, batteries and a time fuse were found in one of Knouth's suitcases. The British Security Services identified Knouth as the person who planted the bomb in the Colonial Office. Shortly after their arrest, 21 letter bombs addressed to senior British figures were intercepted. The letters had been posted in Italy. The intended recipients included Bevin, Attlee, Churchill and Eden. Eden carried a letter bomb in his suitcase for a whole day, thinking it was a Whitehall pamphlet that he would read later in the day. He only realized it was a bomb after being warned by the police, who were informed by MI5.

Knouth was also known as Gilberte/Elizabeth Lazarus. Levstein was travelling as Jacob Elias; his fingerprints connected him to the deaths of several Palestine Policemen as well as an attempt on the life of the British High Commissioner. In September 1947, a Belgian court sentenced Knouth to one year in prison and Levstein to eight months in prison for illegally transporting explosives with intent to commit a felony. In 1973, Margaret Truman wrote that letter bombs were also posted to her father, U.S. President Harry S. Truman, in 1947. Former Lehi leader Yellin-Mor admitted that letter bombs had been sent to British targets but denied that any had been sent to Truman.

=== Murder of Lehi youths by British soldiers ===
On 12 November1947, two weeks before the United Nations voted to recommended partitioning Palestine into Jewish and Arab states as per the United Nations Partition Plan for Palestine in UN General Assembly Resolution 181, British soldiers attacked a house in Ra'anana where a Lehi training course for young people was being held. Four trainees aged 16–18 and their 19-year-old instructor were murdered in retribution against Lehi during the attack.

=== Death threat against Hugh Trevor-Roper ===
Shortly after the 1947 publication of The Last Days of Hitler, Lehi issued a death threat against the author, Hugh Trevor-Roper, for his portrayal of Hitler, feeling that Trevor-Roper had attempted to exonerate the German populace from responsibility.

=== Cairo-Haifa train bombings ===
During the lead-up to the 1948 Arab–Israeli War, Lehi mined the Cairo–Haifa train several times. On 29 February 1948, Lehi mined the train north of Rehovot, killing 28 British soldiers and wounding 35. On 31 March, Lehi mined the train near Binyamina, killing 40 civilians and wounding 60.

=== Attempted Nablus terror attack ===
Shlomo Sand writes that as a method of applying pressure on Arab villagers to abandon their settlements, Lehi planned a terror attack on Nablus and its Arab city headquarters; Lehi fighter Elisha Ibzov (Avraham Cohen) was captured with a truck filled with explosives on his way to the city. Lehi fighters in return abducted four adult villagers and youth from al-Sheikh Muwannis with no connection to Ibzov's capture and threatened to kill them. As rumours spread that they were already murdered, panic set out in the villagers and the settlement became increasingly abandoned, despite the eventual release of the hostages.

=== Deir Yassin massacre ===
One of the most widely known acts of Lehi was the attack on the Palestinian-Arab village of Deir Yassin.

In the months before the British evacuation from Palestine, the Arab League-sponsored Arab Liberation Army (ALA) occupied several strategic points along the road between Jerusalem and Tel Aviv, cutting off supplies to the Jewish part of Jerusalem. One of these points was Deir Yassin. By March 1948, the road was cut off and Jewish Jerusalem was under siege. The Haganah launched Operation Nachshon to break the siege.

On 6 April, the Haganah attacked al-Qastal, a village two kilometres north of Deir Yassin, also overlooking the Jerusalem-Tel Aviv road.

Then on 9 April 1948, about 120 Lehi and Irgun fighters, acting in cooperation with the Haganah, attacked and captured Deir Yassin. The attack was at night, the fighting was confused, and many civilian inhabitants of the village were killed. This action had great consequences for the war, and remains a cause célèbre for Palestinians ever since.

Exactly what happened has never been established clearly. The Arab League reported a great massacre: 254 killed, with rape and lurid mutilations. Israeli investigations claimed the actual number of dead was between 100 and 120, and there were no mass rapes, but most of the dead were civilians and admitted some were killed deliberately. Lehi and Irgun both denied an organized massacre. Accounts by Lehi veterans such as Ezra Yakhin note that many of the attackers were killed or wounded, assert that Arabs fired from every building and that Iraqi and Syrian soldiers were among the dead, and even that some Arab fighters dressed as women.

However, Jewish authorities, including Haganah, the Chief Rabbinate, the Jewish Agency, and David Ben-Gurion, also condemned the attack, lending credence to the charge of massacre. The Jewish Agency even sent a letter of condemnation, apology, and condolence to King Abdullah I of Jordan.

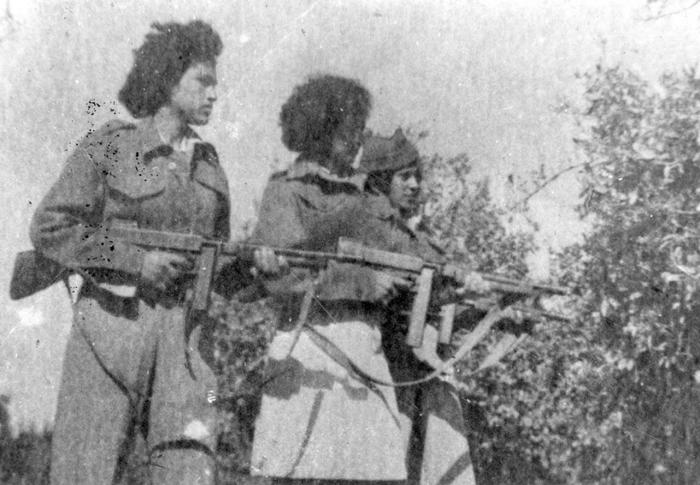
Female Lehi fighters in 1948

Both the Arab reports and Jewish responses had hidden motives: the Arab leaders wanted to encourage Palestinian Arabs to fight rather than surrender, to discredit the Zionists with international opinion, and to increase popular support in their countries for an invasion of Palestine. The Jewish leaders wanted to discredit Irgun and Lehi.

Ironically, the Arab reports backfired in one respect: frightened Palestinian Arabs did not surrender, but did not fight either – they fled, allowing Israel to gain much territory with little fighting and also without absorbing many Arabs.

Lehi similarly interpreted events at Deir Yassin as turning the tide of war in favour of the Jews. Lehi leader Israel Eldad later wrote in his memoirs from the underground period that "without Deir Yassin the State of Israel could never have been established".

The Deir Yassin story did not much sway international opinion. It did increase, not only support but pressure on Arab governments to intervene. Abdullah of Jordan was now compelled to join the invasion of Palestine after Israel's declaration of independence on 14 May.

=== Assassination of Count Folke Bernadotte ===
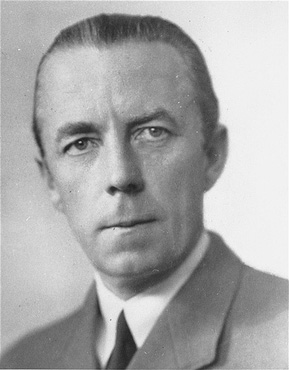
UN mediator Count Folke Bernadotte was assassinated by Lehi in Jerusalem in 1948.

Although Lehi had stopped operating nationally after May 1948, the group continued to function in Jerusalem. On 17 September 1948, Lehi assassinated UN mediator Count Folke Bernadotte. The assassination was directed by Yehoshua Zettler and carried out by a four-man team led by Meshulam Makover. The fatal shots were fired by Yehoshua Cohen. The Security Council described the assassination as a "cowardly act which appears to have been committed by a criminal group of terrorists".

Three days after the assassination, the Israeli government passed the Ordinance to Prevent Terrorism and declared Lehi to be a terrorist organization. Many Lehi members were arrested, including leaders Nathan Yellin-Mor and Matityahu Shmulevitz who were arrested on 29 September. Eldad and Shamir managed to escape arrest. Yellin-Mor and Schmulevitz were charged with leadership of a terrorist organization and on 10 February 1949 were sentenced to 8 years and 5 years imprisonment, respectively. However the State (Temporary) Council soon announced a general amnesty for Lehi members and they were released.

=== The Lehi trial and the Fighters' Party ===
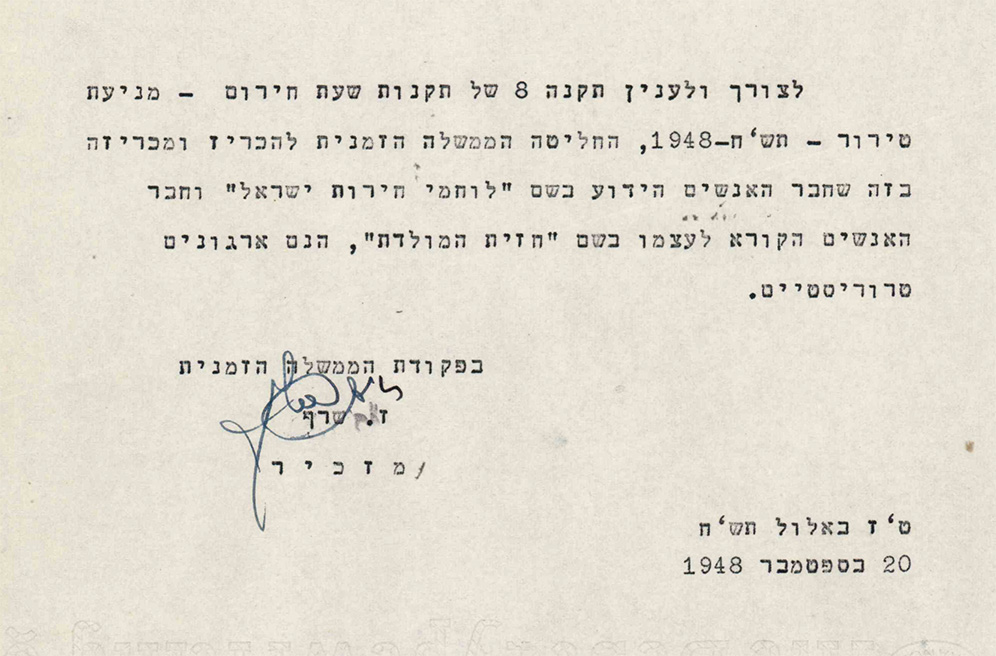
Declaration of Lehi as a terrorist organization, September 20, 1948

Between 5 December 1948 and 25 January 1949, Yellin-Mor and Shmuelevitz were tried in a military court on terrorism charges. The prosecution accused them of the murder of Bernadotte, though they were not specifically charged with it. Senior officers of the IDF, including Yisrael Galili and David Shaltiel, told the court that Lehi had hindered, rather than assisted the fight against the British and the Arabs.

While the trial was in progress, some of the Lehi leadership founded a USSR-leaning political party called the Fighters' List with Yellin-Mor as its leader. The party took part in the elections in January 1949 with Yellin-Mor and Shmuelevitz heading the list. The trial verdict was handed down on 10 February, soon after the Fighters' List had won one seat with only 1.2% of the vote. Yellin-Mor was sentenced to 8 years and Shmuelevitz to 5 years imprisonment, but the court agreed to remit the sentences if the prisoners agreed to a list of conditions. The Provisional State Council then authorised their pardon. The party disbanded after several years and did not contest the 1951 elections.

In 1956, some Lehi veterans established the Semitic Action movement, which sought the creation of a regional federation encompassing Israel and its Arab neighbours on the basis of an anti-colonialist alliance with other indigenous inhabitants of the Middle East.

Not all Lehi alumni gave up political violence after independence: former members were involved in the activities of the Kingdom of Israel militant group, the 1957 assassination of Rudolf Kastner, and likely the 1952 attempted assassination of David-Zvi Pinkas.

== Publications ==
Lehi produced a range of publications containing unabashedly racist literature referring to Jews as a "master race" and Arabs as a "slave race". Prominent publications included Hamaas (Ahe Action), a weekly publication, as well as the monthly HaKhazit (The Front), daily Mivrak (Telegram), and BaMahteret (Underground).

== Service ribbon ==
The Lehi ribbon

In 1980, Israel instituted the Lehi ribbon, red, black, grey, pale blue and white, which is awarded to former members of the Lehi underground who wished to carry it, "for military service towards the establishment of the State of Israel".

== "Unknown Soldiers" anthem ==
The words and music of a song "Unknown Soldiers" (Hebrew: חיילים אלמונים, romanized: Hayalim Almonim, also translated "Anonymous Soldiers") were written by Avraham Stern in 1932 during the early days of the Irgun. It became the Irgun's anthem until the split with Lehi in 1940, after which it became the Lehi anthem.

== Prominent members of Lehi ==
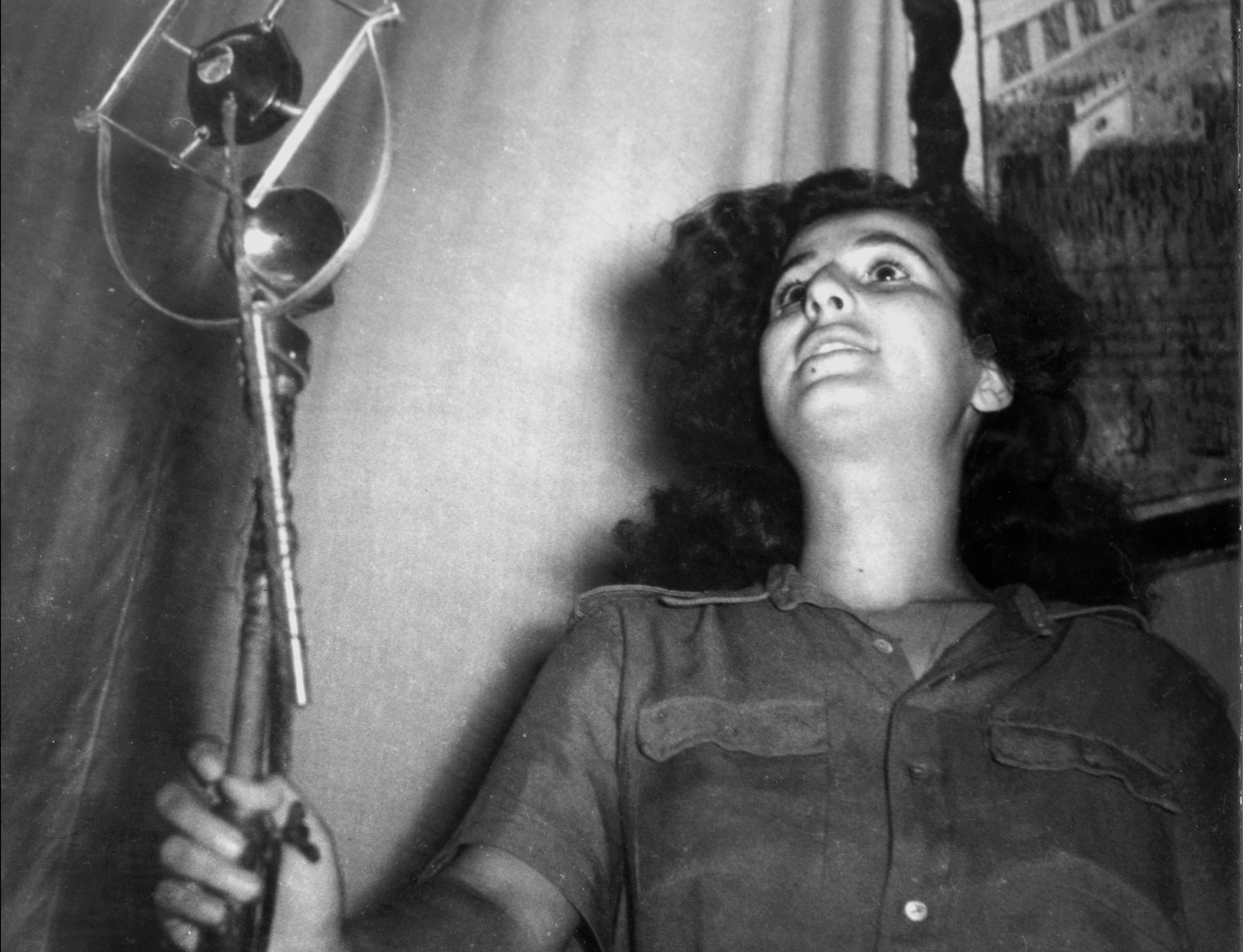
Geulah Cohen, announcer of the Lehi underground radio station (1948)

A number of Lehi's members went on to play important roles in Israel's public life.

- Shaltiel Ben-Yair, explosives expert, organised together with Amos Kenan the assassination attempt against the Transportation Minister in 1952
- Eliyahu Bet-Zuri, executed in 1945 for his part in the assassination of Lord Moyne
- Geula Cohen, member of the Knesset
- Israel Eldad, leader in the Israeli national camp
- Boaz Evron, left-wing journalist
- Maxim Ghilan, Israeli journalist, author and peace activist
- Eliyahu Giladi, killed in 1943 by his Lehi comrades for arguing in favour of committing acts considered too extreme even by them
- Uri Zvi Greenberg, Israeli poet and journalist
- Eliyahu Hakim, executed in 1945 for assassinating Lord Moyne
- Amos Kenan, writer
- Baruch Korff, Orthodox rabbi
- Yitzhak Shamir, Israeli prime minister 1983–1984 and 1986–1992
- Avraham Stern, leader and ideologist
- Shimon Tzabar, author, painter, mycologist and anti-Zionist activist
- Yaakov Yardaur, lawyer and advocate for equal rights for the Arab citizens of Israel
- Natan Yellin-Mor, member of the Knesset 1949–1951, leftist advocate of peace with Arabs.

== See also ==
- List of Lehi operations
- List of Lehi members
- Jewish insurgency in Palestine
- Roy Farran, letter bomb incident
