= Shoshana (film) =

- Theatrical release poster
- Directed by: Michael Winterbottom
- Screenplay by: Laurence Coriat; Paul Viragh; Michael Winterbottom
- Produced by: Massimo Di Rocco; Josh Hyams; Luigi Napoleone
- Starring: Douglas Booth; Irina Starshenbaum; Harry Melling; Aury Alby; Ian Hart; Rony Herman; Yarden Lavi; Doron Kochavi; Ofer Seker
- Cinematography: Giles Nuttgens
- Production companies: Vision Distribution; Revolution Films; Bartlebyfilm
- Distributed by: Altitude Film Distribution
- Release dates: September 8, 2023 (TIFF); February 23, 2024 (United Kingdom); July 25, 2025 (United States)
- Running time: 121 minutes
- Countries: United Kingdom; Italy
- Languages: English; Hebrew; Arabic; Russian
- Box office: $244,244

Shoshana is a 2023 British biographical thriller film directed by Michael Winterbottom.

The film is set in 1930s/1940s British Mandatory Palestine. It follows the tragic love story of Shoshana Borochov (Irina Starshenbaum), daughter of one of the founders of socialist Zionism, and British police officer Tom Wilkin (Douglas Booth), while Wilkin and fellow police officer Geoffrey J. Morton (Harry Melling) hunt for Zionist militant Avraham Stern (Aury Alby).

== Plot and Historical Background ==
Set in 1938 to 1942/44, the film takes place in Tel Aviv, where tensions are high as the British, under their League of Nations mandate, attempt to maintain order in a city with a mixed Arab and Jewish population. Thomas Wilkin, a British deputy superintendent of the Palestinian police, becomes romantically involved with Shoshana, the daughter of Ber Borochov, a co-founder of the Zionist labor movement.

Shoshana is a member of the Jewish Defense Force Haganah, which was formed in the early 1920s to defend against Arab attacks on Jewish settlers. Initially Haganah was tolerated by and did not oppose the British authorities in their efforts to control violent outbreaks. In 1931 a more radical offshoot Irgun was formed with the goal of ejecting the British and creating a Jewish state on both sides of the Jordan River. In the film Irgun member Avraham Stern is initially caught and arrested by British police superintendent Morton, who forces Wilkin to end the British toleration of Haganah. This sets up a split between Shoshana and Wilkin.

In August 1940, in the first phase of World War II, Stern and other Irgun members were released because Irgun suspended its fight against the British. Upon his release Stern formed an even more radical organization Lehi that initially sought a cooperation with Nazi Germany because it was at war with Britain and was forcing increased Jewish emigration from Europe to Palestine. In February 1942 Morton and Wilkin finally catch up with Stern, who was shot dead during his arrest. This leads to Lehi's vendetta against Morton and Wilkin and the culminating event of the film, which took place in 1944. (In real life Shoshana Borochov and Tom Wilkin were in a relationship from 1933 to 1944.)

The film starts and ends with documentary newsreel footage from the early 1930s to 1948.

== Cast ==
- Douglas Booth as Tom Wilkin
- Irina Starshenbaum as Shoshana Borochov
- Harry Melling as Geoffrey J. Morton
- Aury Alby as Avraham Stern
- Ian Hart as Robert Chambers
- Gina Bramhill as Alice Morton

== Production ==
Winterbottom developed the film for many years. In 2010, Jim Sturgess, Colin Firth and Matthew Macfadyen were announced as its stars. While the film never entered production in 2010, Winterbottom did shoot documentary footage in Israel at the time with surviving participants in the events.

Filming began in October 2021 in the town of Ostuni in Italy, which doubled for Tel Aviv, and in city of Taranto, which doubled for Jaffa.

The screenplay was written by Winterbottom, Laurence Coriat and Paul Viragh.

== Release ==
The film had its world premiere at the 2023 Toronto International Film Festival. It was released by Altitude Film Distribution on 23 February 2024 in the UK, and by Greenwich Entertainment on 25 July 2025 in the US.

== Reception ==
The film received generally positive reviews. On the review aggregator website Rotten Tomatoes, 72% of 54 critics' reviews are positive. The website's consensus reads: "Shoshana is a solidly fact-based historical thriller whose complex themes are occasionally underserved by director Michael Winterbottom's facile treatment." Metacritic, which uses a weighted average, assigned the film a score of 65 out of 100, based on eight critics, indicating "generally favorable" reviews.

Ellen E. Jones gave the film four out of five stars in her review in The Observer. Jones described the film as "intelligent and compelling", continuing to praise it for "giving valuable insight into the variance of opinion within the era’s Zionist movement." Film critic Mark Kermode also praised the film: "The fact that most of what the story tells us is actually true, I think gives it a kind of a real sense of bite that this relationship does become a microcosm of a much wider conflict." John Nathan of The Jewish Chronicle wrote "Winterbottom deserves credit for conveying complexity on a subject where fervently held opinion much prefers simplicity." However, Nathan criticised the film for doing "nothing to reflect the huge proportion of modern Israel’s population that originates in the Middle East and Africa." Hannah Brown of The Jerusalem Post felt that the scope of the story and setting was better suited to a miniseries format: "But somehow, the wide canvas here doesn’t present a satisfying picture, despite the echoes of the conflict that continue till today. I almost wished this were a mini-series rather than a movie, so each character could be developed further. Tel Aviv of this era was so complex, that it defeats this attempt to tell its story in two hours."
