= Irina Starshenbaum =

Russian actress (born 1992)

- Born: Irina Vladimirovna Starshenbaum; 30 March 1992 (age 34); Moscow, Russia
- Occupation: Actress
- Years active: 2013–present
- Awards: TEFI (2020)

Irina Vladimirovna Starshenbaum (Russian: Ирина Владимировна Старшенба́ум; born 30 March 1992) is a Russian actress. For her role in T-34, she won the TEFI award for Best Actress and was a nominee for the Golden Eagle Award for Best Actress.

== Biography ==
She graduated from the Faculty of Media Business and Public Relations at Moscow State University of Printing Arts.

She has been acting since 2013. In 2017, she made her debut in a feature film, a lead role in the science fiction movie Attraction by Fyodor Bondarchuk.

In 2018, Kirill Serebrennikov's film about Viktor Tsoi and Mike Naumenko Leto was released, in which Irina played a lead role.

In the winter of 2018, together with other actors and musicians, she recorded a collective video message to President Putin with a request to pass the Law on the Protection of Animal Rights.

In 2023, she had her first English-speaking role in Michael Winterbottom's Shoshana. She plays Shoshana Borochov, daughter of Ber Borochov, one of the founders of socialist Zionism.

== Personal life ==
After filming the movie Attraction, she began dating actor Alexander Petrov. In 2017, they announced their engagement, but broke up in 2019. She is Jewish.

In February 2022, she opposed Russia’s invasion of Ukraine.

== Selected filmography ==
- 2017 — Attraction as Yuliya Lebedeva
- 2017 — Black Water as Polina
- 2018 — Ice as Zhzhyonova
- 2018 — Leto as Natalia Naumenko
- 2019 — T-34 as Anya Yartseva, translator
- 2019 — Gold Diggers as Ulyana Lisina
- 2020 — Invasion as Yuliya Lebedeva
- 2020 — Sherlock in Russia as Sofya Kasatkina
- 2021 — Hostel as Nelly
- 2021 — Mediator as Marina
- 2021 — Koschey: The Everlasting Story as May (voice)
- 2022 — Dark Satellites
- 2022 — In Two as Ira
- 2023 — Shoshana as Shoshana Borochov
- 2023 — Fisher as Nadezhda Raikina
- 2024 — The Enchanted Tinderbox as Nastasya Ivanovna
- 2025 — There as Vera
