= Lehi Museum =

Museum in Tel Aviv, Israel

Coordinates: 32.056581°N 34.769434°E

The Lehi Museum, Tel Aviv
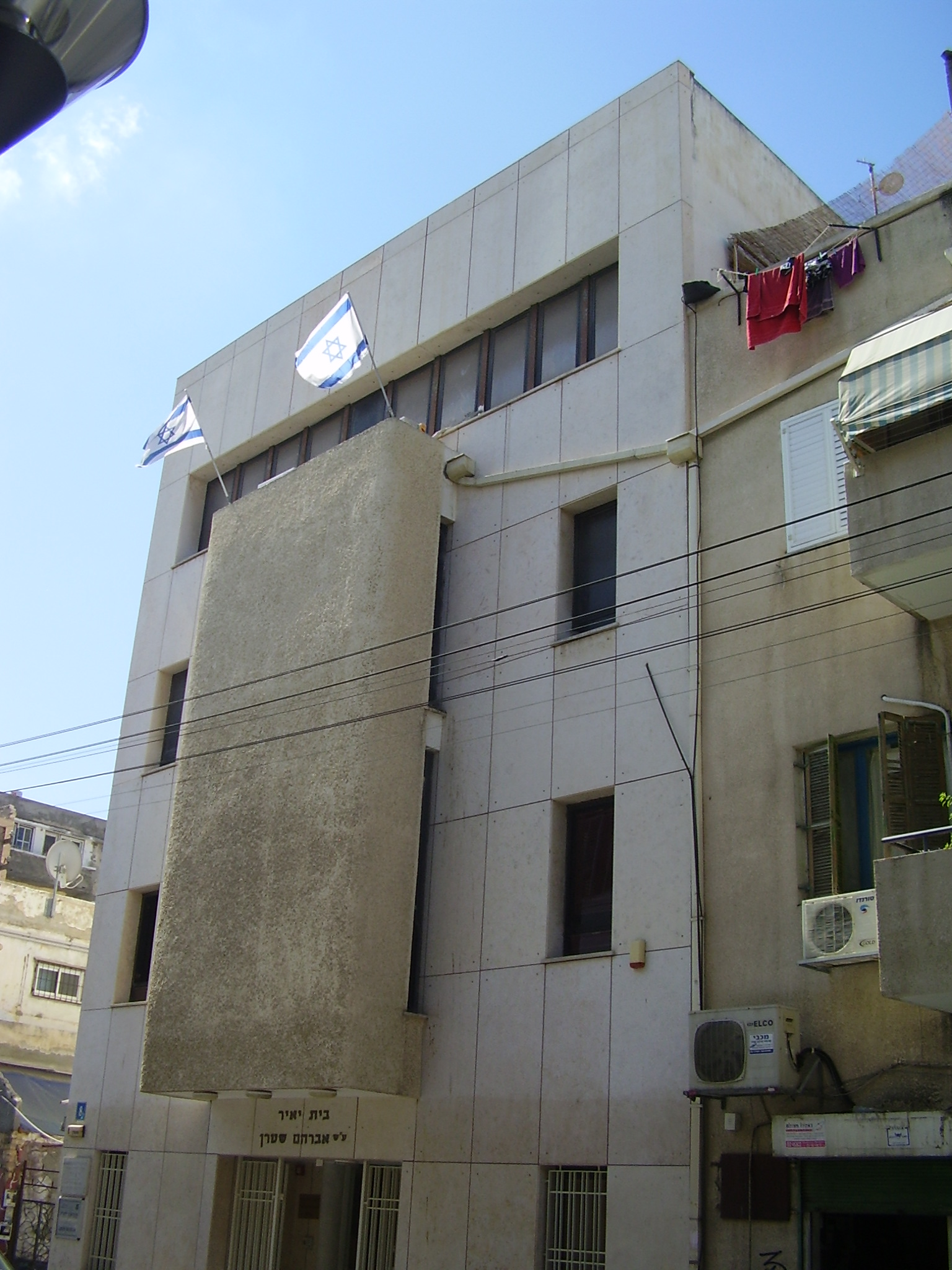
- Established: 1985
- Location: Tel Aviv, Israel
- Type: history
- Director: Inbar Kavenshtok
- Website: http://www.mod.gov.il/pages/heritage/lechi.asp

The Lehi Museum, also known as Beit Yair is a museum in Israel about the history of the Lehi, a Zionist paramilitary organization. The museum opened in 1985 and is operated by the Museum Department of the Ministry of Defense. It is located in the house where the founder of Lehi, Avraham Stern (Yair) was killed. The offices of the Lehi organization are located on the ground floor. The museum is located at 8 Stern Street in Tel Aviv's Florentin neighborhood.

== Avraham Stern (Yair) ==
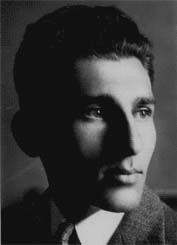
Avraham Stern (Yair)

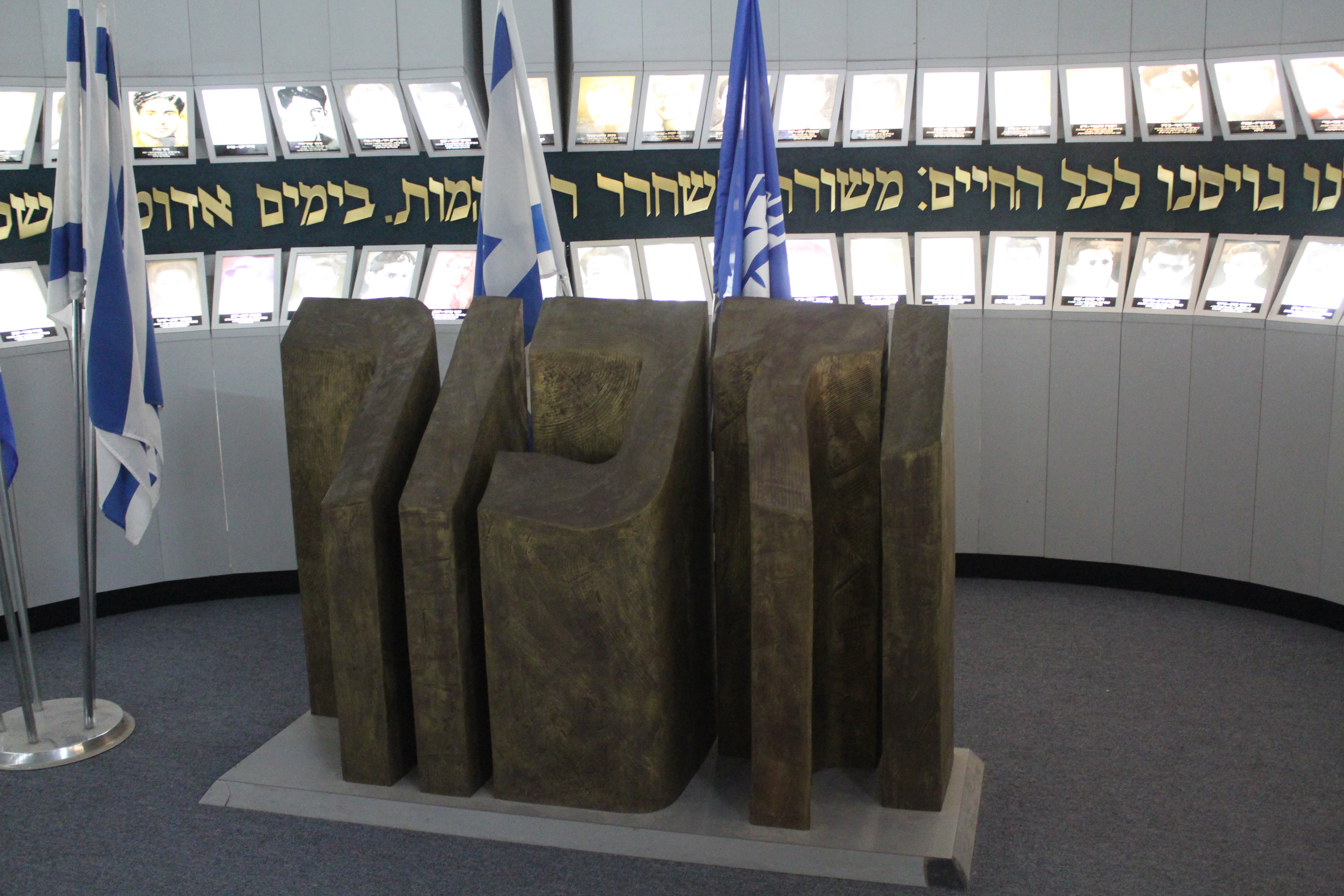
The Memorial Room

The top floor of the museum is dedicated to Avraham Stern, the founder of Lehi. This floor of the building was formerly the apartment of Lehi members Tova and Moshe Savorai, and Stern lived there on his last three weeks. On 12 February 1942, British officers came to the Savorais' rented apartment looking for Stern. Stern was hiding in the wardrobe and Tova opened the door to the officers. Only on the second search of the house did they find Stern. Officer Geoffrey J. Morton came later, ordered Stern to stand next to the window, and shot him three times, killing him. One of the bullet holes is still left on the frame of the window.

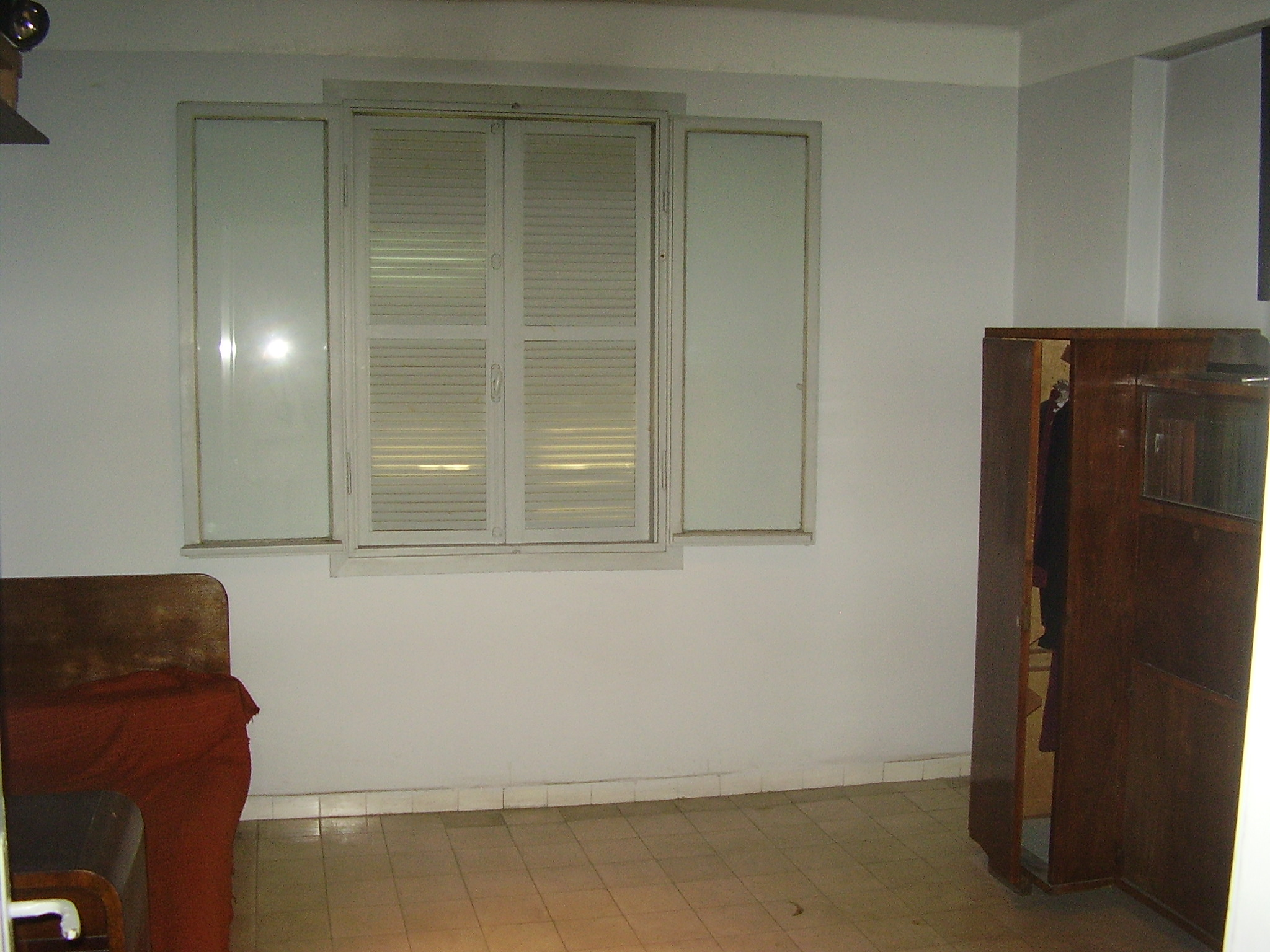
The room where Abraham Stern, Lehi commander, was murdered by a British policeman on 12/2/1942

Also on this floor are excerpts from poems written by Stern. One of the songs he wrote called "unknown soldiers"; this song was the anthem of the Irgun organization and later he became an anthem of Lehi Organization.

== Lehi organization ==
The second floor is dedicated to the Lehi organization. In this floor the Lehi organization development is described in chronological order. The Floor is devoted to operations carried out against the British. Most of them were made after the death of Stern. The Lehi organization operated until Israel was established. After the death of Stern many members of the organization were arrested. At that time, most of the management was appointed from the Lehi, largely run by Nathan Yellin-Mor, Yitzhak Shamir and Israel Eldad. Models of Lehi's operations, its propaganda, and several members' prosecutions are depicted on the museum's second floor. Alongside this there is also a view of the activities of Lehi that was carried out overseas.

== See also ==
- List of museums in Israel
