= Douglas Booth =

British actor (born 1992)

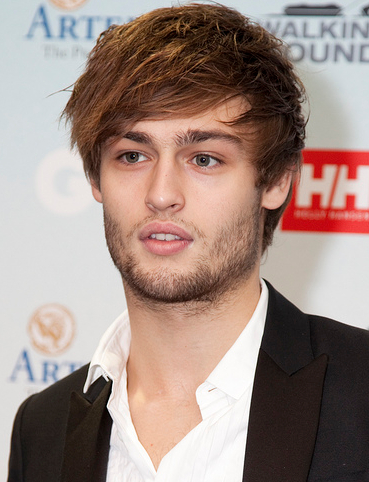
- Booth in 2011
- Born: Douglas John Booth; 9 July 1992 (age 34); Greenwich, London, England
- Education: National Youth Music Theatre; Guildhall School of Music and Drama
- Occupations: Actor, musician
- Years active: 2006–present
- Spouse: Bel Powley (m. 2023)
- Relatives: Mark Powley (father-in-law)

Douglas John Booth (born 9 July 1992) is an English actor and musician. He first came to public attention through his performance as Boy George in the BBC Two film Worried About the Boy (2010). He went on to star in the BBC adaptations of Great Expectations and Christopher and His Kind (both 2011), Carlo Carlei's film adaptation of Romeo & Juliet (2013), and the Netflix biopic The Dirt (2019).

Booth also appeared in Darren Aronofsky's Noah and Lone Scherfig's The Riot Club (both 2014) and co-starred in The Wachowskis' Jupiter Ascending (2015).

== Early life and education ==
Douglas John Booth was born in Greenwich, London, to Vivien (née De Cala), a painter, and Simon Booth, a shipping finance consultant and former managing director of both CitiGroup and Deutsche Bank's shipping finance divisions. Booth's father is English, and his mother is of Spanish and Dutch ancestry. His older sister, Abigail, is a Chelsea School of Art graduate. Booth spent his early childhood in Greenwich and moved to Sevenoaks, Kent at the age of ten.

Booth is severely dyslexic and found it "very hard" to read or write up until the age of ten; he remains "a really slow reader". He struggled at school, "having to put in double or triple the amount of effort as everyone else" but said the condition made him "more resilient in every sense". He played the trumpet as a child. Booth took his first major roles in musicals presented by the Sackville Children's Choir at the Stag Theatre in Sevenoaks. He played Leader of the Rats in Rats! The Musical, and Uncle Andrew in The Magician's Nephew. He further developed his interest in drama at the age of twelve, after starring in a school production of Agamemnon: "I found myself feeling really engaged for the first time ... I thought, 'I rather like being the centre of attention. This is where I want to be.'" By the age of thirteen, he was involved with the National Youth Theatre and the Guildhall School of Music and Drama.

Booth received both private and state education; he attended Solefield School, a boys' junior independent school in Sevenoaks, followed by Bennett Memorial Diocesan School, a Church of England state Voluntary Aided school in the town of Royal Tunbridge Wells (Kent), and Lingfield Notre Dame School, an independent school in the village of Lingfield in Surrey.

Booth joined the Curtis Brown acting agency at the age of fifteen. He won his first professional acting role at the age of sixteen and quit his A levels in drama, media studies and English literature.

== Career ==
=== Early work ===
Booth's first professional role was in the children's adventure film From Time to Time (2009), directed by Julian Fellowes and starring Maggie Smith and Timothy Spall. Following the film's release, Booth signed to the UTA talent agency for American-based representation. He then had a minor role as Prince Eustace in the Channel 4 miniseries The Pillars of the Earth (2010), a medieval saga filmed in Budapest with Ian McShane and Donald Sutherland. Also in 2009 and 2010, Booth modelled in several Mario Testino-shot campaigns for the luxury fashion label Burberry; he starred in the Autumn 2009 campaign with Emma Watson, the Autumn 2010 campaign with Rosie Huntington-Whiteley, and the Burberry Sport fragrance campaign with Lily Donaldson.

=== Breakthrough ===
Booth rose to prominence in 2010 following his performance as the pop star Boy George in the BBC Two drama Worried About the Boy. He underwent a physical transformation for the role, shaving off his eyebrows and wearing heavy makeup. Booth met Boy George during filming, with the singer remarking: "He just gets it. There's something about him that reminds me of me when I was 17." Writing in The Daily Telegraph, Ceri Radford said Booth delivered a "mesmerising" performance: "He offered a convincing portrayal of O'Dowd as a beautiful young man who oozed ambiguous sex appeal and protected his feelings with a carapace of prickly wit." Mike Higgins of The Independent declared Booth "a discovery": "Moving, witty, he also got the singer's wheezy enunciation down pat."

Booth next played the role of Pip in the BBC One adaptation of Dickens' Great Expectations (2011), alongside Gillian Anderson and Ray Winstone. Broadcast over the Christmas period, the miniseries was a huge ratings success. Anne Billson of The Telegraph felt it was a misstep to cast someone "so distractingly lovely" in the role of Pip: "It's not that Douglas Booth was bad, it's just that one can't imagine Dickens ever intended Pip to be more beautiful than Estella, who, after all, has been brought up to break men's hearts." Mike Hale of The New York Times dismissed Booth as "a CW-style actor whose exceptionally pretty face doesn't convey much beyond puzzlement and petulance." Betsy Sharkey of the Los Angeles Times, however, found the actor's performance "haunting" while Emma Jones of The Huffington Post dismissed the "debate over the extreme prettiness of Douglas Booth", arguing that "Booth's beauty is only a backdrop to Pip's naivety."

Also in 2011, Booth appeared in the BBC film Christopher and His Kind, which explored novelist Christopher Isherwood's formative years in 1930s Berlin. He played Heinz, a German street-sweeper who became the lover of Matt Smith's Isherwood.

In 2012, Booth starred opposite Miley Cyrus and Demi Moore in the teen drama LOL. He witnessed the paparazzi interest surrounding co-star Cyrus during filming: "It was bizarre and, interestingly, not at all glamorous." Filmed in 2010, when Booth was seventeen, the movie received a very limited theatrical release and unfavourable reviews. Later that year, Booth read selected extracts from David Copperfield as part of Sky Arts's In Love With Dickens documentary; other contributors included Simon Callow and Miriam Margolyes.

In 2013, Booth starred opposite Hailee Steinfeld in Carlo Carlei's film adaptation of Shakespeare's Romeo and Juliet. Betsy Sharkey of the Los Angeles Times praised Booth's memorable performance: "It's not so much that he makes a great Romeo; frankly DiCaprio's was better in Luhrmann's version, as was Leonard Whiting in Zeffirelli's … But it has been a while since a camera has so loved a face ... If anything, the movies in general are too intent on reducing Booth to that singular feature, when he is actually a fine actor." R. Kurt Osenlund of Slant felt that Booth gives "a rather fantastic breakthrough performance, offering a poignant interpretation of one of literature's greatest lovers." Mick LaSalle of the San Francisco Chronicle bemoaned the poor casting of Steinfeld: "And this is especially a shame because Douglas Booth as Romeo is quite good and could have been better, if only he had someone to play off of." Todd McCarthy of The Hollywood Reporter remarked that Booth "seems to have a grasp of what he's saying and behaves in credibly laddish fashion ... but Booth's vocal range is very narrow, and he speaks in a monotone." Claudia Puig of USA Today found Booth "more skilled" than Steinfeld "in the passionate intonation department" while The Independent's Geoffrey MacNab asserted that Booth "shows a certain star quality."

=== 2014–present ===
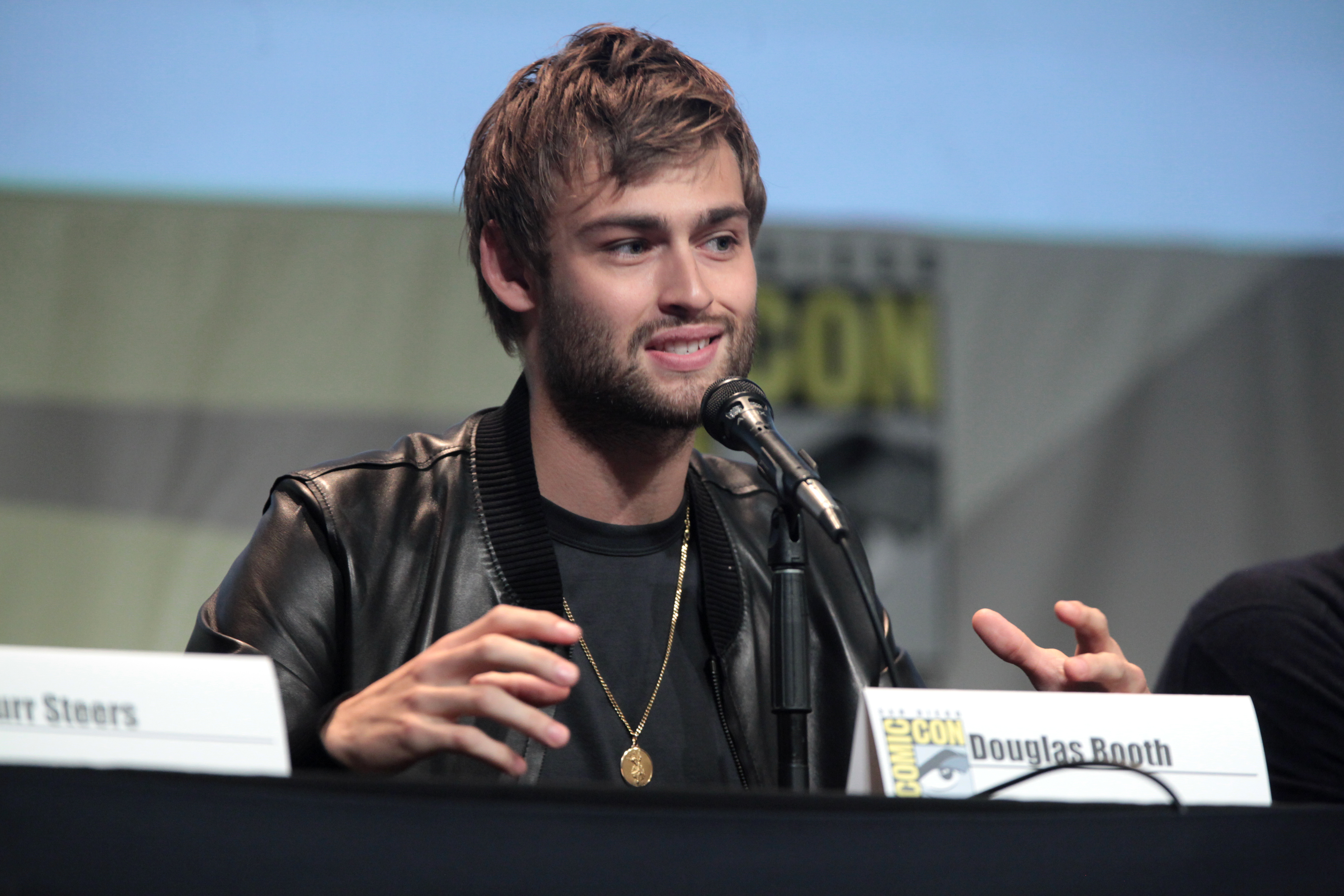
Booth at the 2015 San Diego Comic-Con promoting Pride and Prejudice and Zombies

In March 2014, he appeared as Shem in Darren Aronofsky's biblical epic Noah. Emma Watson played his character's wife; she first met Booth while shooting a Burberry fashion campaign in 2009: "There's something old-mannish about Doug, which he had even then. He knows who he is. He doesn't get intimidated, doesn't hold back, and is generally fearless."

In September 2014, Booth starred alongside Sam Claflin, Max Irons and Freddie Fox in the black comedy The Riot Club, directed by Lone Scherfig. Based on the stage play by Laura Wade, the ensemble piece centres around ten members of an exclusive Oxford University dining club known as The Riot Club, based on the real-life Bullingdon Club. Booth made "friends for life" during the film shoot, and has said of the characters: "When you meet these sort of guys, they're always so charming. It's almost more discomfiting for the audience to be charmed by them, to like them a lot, and to see how far they'll go with them." In February 2015, he appeared in The Wachowskis' science-fiction film Jupiter Ascending, starring Mila Kunis, Channing Tatum and Eddie Redmayne. "They're just the most original people," Booth has said of the Wachowskis. "They've created something very exciting and special and bonkers." He played Mr. Bingley in Pride and Prejudice and Zombies (2016), an adaptation of the novel of the same name by Seth Grahame-Smith.

In November 2017, Booth starred in the international film Loving Vincent, as Armand Roulin, one of the models for Vincent van Gogh's Roulin Family portraits. Booth played Mötley Crüe bassist Nikki Sixx in the 2019 film The Dirt.

Booth played the writer boyfriend, Don, opposite Margaret Qualley in the 2020 film My Salinger Year.

== Personal life ==
On 3 July 2021, Douglas announced on his Instagram account that he had proposed to his girlfriend Bel Powley on Primrose Hill, having met in 2016 on the set of Mary Shelley. The wedding took place on 28 October 2023 at Petersham Nurseries in Richmond, followed by an afterparty at the Institute of Contemporary Arts. The couple were married under a chuppah made by Booth's sister, an artist, to honour Powley's Jewish heritage.

=== Philanthropy ===
Booth has been supporting UNHCR since 2015. Booth has supported various UNHCR fundraising events and campaigns.

== Filmography ==
Key
†	Denotes projects that have not yet been released

=== Film ===
Year	Title	Role	Notes	Ref.
2009	From Time to Time	Sefton Oldknow		
2010	Worried About the Boy	Boy George	Television film	
2011	Christopher and His Kind	Heinz Neddermeyer	Television film	
2012	LOL	Kyle Ross		
2013	Romeo & Juliet	Romeo Montague		
2014	Noah	Shem		
2014	The Riot Club	Harry Villiers		
2015	Jupiter Ascending	Titus Abrasax		
2016	Pride and Prejudice and Zombies	Mr. Bingley		
2016	The Limehouse Golem	Dan Leno		
2017	Loving Vincent	Armand Roulin		
2017	Mary Shelley	Percy Bysshe Shelley		
2019	The Dirt	Nikki Sixx		
2020	My Salinger Year	Don		
2023	Unwelcome	Jamie		
2023	Shoshana	Thomas Wilkin		
2024	Young Werther	Werther		
TBA	The Way of the Wind †	TBA	Post-production	

=== Television ===
Year	Title	Role	Notes	Ref.
2010	The Pillars of the Earth	Prince Eustace	Miniseries; 8 episodes	
2011	Great Expectations	Pip	Miniseries; 3 episodes	
2012	In Love With...	Ham Peggotty	Episode: "In Love with Dickens"	
2015	And Then There Were None	Anthony James Marston	Miniseries; 1 episode	
2022	That Dirty Black Bag	Red Bill	Miniseries; 8 episodes	
2025	The Sandman	Cluracan	Recurring role; 7 episodes	
2026	The Blame	DI Tom Radley	Series regular; 6 episodes	
TBA	War †	TBA	Post-production	

=== Audiobooks ===
Year	Title	Role
2017	Northanger Abbey	John Thorpe
2017	Scarlet City Part I, II, III	Jonah
