= The Enchanted Tinderbox =

- Directed by: Aleksandr Voytinskiy
- Written by: Aleksandr Arkhipov (ru)
- Based on: The Tinderbox by Hans Christian Andersen
- Produced by: Sergey Selyanov (ru); Anton Zlatopolsky (ru); Natalya Smirnova; Aleksandr Gorokhov; Anastasia Kins
- Starring: Roman Evdokimov; Irina Starshenbaum; Antonina Boyko; Vitaly Khaev (ru); Mikhail Trukhin (ru); Yan Tsapnik; Sergey Marin
- Cinematography: Dmitrii Shebunin
- Music by: Sergey Luran
- Production companies: CTB Film Company; CGF Films; Studio Globus; Russia-1; TNT; Cinema Fund
- Distributed by: Central Partnership
- Release date: October 24, 2024 (Russia)
- Running time: 106 minutes
- Country: Russia
- Language: Russian
- Budget: ₽275 million
- Box office: ₽1.189 billion; $11.8 million (worldwide)

The Enchanted Tinderbox (Russian: Огниво, romanized: Ognivo, lit. 'The Tinderbox') is a 2024 Russian fantasy film loosely based on the 1835 fairy tale The Tinderbox by Hans Christian Andersen. The film was directed by Aleksandr Voytinskiy, who co-wrote the script with Aleksandr Arkhipov and starred Roman Evdokimov, Irina Starshenbaum, Antonina Boyko, Vitaly Khaev, Mikhail Trukhin, and Yan Tsapnik in supporting roles.

This film was theatrically released in Russia by Central Partnership on October 24, 2024.

== Plot ==
The fairytale kingdom has everything except the king. The queen suddenly loses her memory. The cheerful and cunning Ivan (English: John) found an old lighter, from which a princess named Dasha appears. She needs help. Vanya will have to fight not only for her, but also for truth, hope and love.

== Cast ==
- Roman Evdokimov as Ivan "Vanya" (English: John "Johnny")
- Irina Starshenbaum as Tsarina Nastasya Ivanovna
- Antonina Boyko as Darya "Dasha"
- Vitaly Khaev as Likhodey
- Mikhail Trukhin as Balalay
- Yan Tsapnik as Jean
- Sergey Marin as Foma

== Production ==
On August 2, 2023, the CTB Film Company, the Russia-1 TV channel, and the CGF Films, with the support of the Cinema Fund, began filming the full-length film The Enchanted Tinderbox based on the fairy tale of the same name by Hans Christian Andersen.

The film combines characters from many Russian fairy tales. The creators of The Enchanted Tinderbox previously worked on the films Upon the Magic Roads, which became one of the highest-grossing Russian releases and grossed more than one billion rubles in 2021, as well as Wish of the Fairy Fish, which was released on October 26, 2023.

=== Filming ===
Principal photography began in August 2023, filming is taking place in the Republic of Karelia, the city of Saint Petersburg, as well as in the Novgorod Oblast is a region on the territory of such historical sites as the Novgorod Kremlin, the Vitoslavlitsy Museum-Reserve and the Znamenskoye Compound.

== Reception ==
=== Box office ===
During its debut weekend, The Enchanted Tinderbox earned 275 million rubles, topping the Russian box office from October 24 to October 27.
