= Jung Borochovistim =

Jewish youth movement

Jung Borochovistim, also known as Jungbor, was a Jewish youth movement named after the Marxist Zionist Ber Borochov. The youth movement was affiliated with Left Poale Zion.

== Notes ==
This article incorporates text from the United States Holocaust Memorial Museum, and has been released under the GFDL.
