= Shay Stern =

Israeli TV personality

- שי שטרן
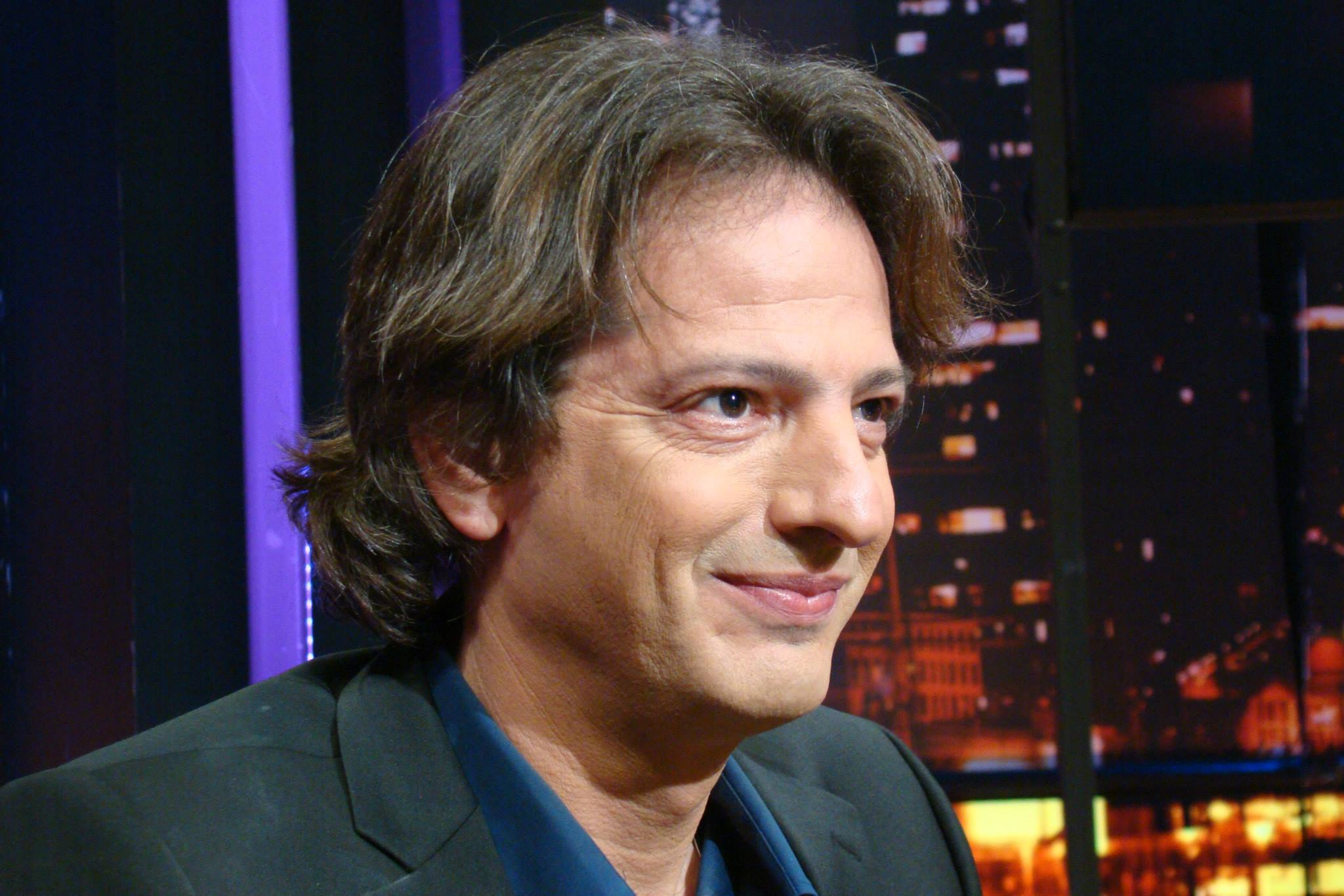
- Stern in 2013
- Born: 7 March 1967 (age 59); Jerusalem, Israel
- Citizenship: Israeli
- Education: Hebrew University of Jerusalem
- Occupations: Presenter writer
- Relatives: Yair Stern (father); Avraham Stern (grandfather)

Shay Stern (Hebrew: שי שטרן; born 7 March 1967) is an Israeli television personality and presenter.

== Early life ==
Stern was born on 1967. He is one of four children of journalist Yair Stern. His grandfather Avraham Stern was the leader of the militant Zionist group named Lehi, who was assassinated in 1942 by the British authorities in Mandatory Palestine.

Stern grew up in the Tzameret HaBira suburb of Jerusalem. He attended and graduated from the Hebrew University of Jerusalem.

== TV career ==
From 1997 to 1999, he produced "The 91st Minute" program in the Sports Channel 2. In 1999, Stern produced the humorous late night show titled "Halomot BeHaKitzis", which was presented by comedians Eyal Kitzis and Tal Friedman, and was a great success.

In 2008 he produced the humorous amusement quiz program on Channel 24. In 2009, he co-produced and co- hosted with Amira Bouzaglo the interview program "Do Not Ask", which was first program to broadcast on Bip channel at late night. In this show, Stern first moved to the front of the screen as a presenter and interviewer. After two seasons, the show moved to Channel 2 for an earlier broadcast hour. Stern combined in the program interviews with unfamiliar fringe people, with strange hobbies alongside interviews of celebrities from the entertainment industry.

His interview style incorporated awkward and naive questions, sometimes silly, that manage to surprise the interviewees and elicit unexpected answers from them. In the third season, on Channel 2, he combined interviews with politicians and dealt with economic, social and political questions, also in his unique style. After five seasons of "Do Not Ask", he began airing a talk show called "Speak to Me" on Channel 24.

In April 2013, he left Channel 2 and moved to Channel 10, to begin hosting program called "Shay on Friday", which included 29 programs. The show was filmed in front of an audience, and also incorporated field articles in which Stern continued to engage with various social issues. In August 2014, the program returned earlier than planned in a special edition of 2014 Israel–Gaza conflict, and was filmed without an audience and was called "Shay on Broadcast". The program has since been broadcast in this format. In October 2014, the second season aired. Starting in January 2019, the sixth season of the program was broadcast on Channel 13.

== Personal life ==
Stern and his wife Daphna have three children, and they currently reside in Herzliya.

In 2012, his book Mickey, I'm Talking to You was published by Modan Publishing House. The book deals with a Jerusalemite who is at a turning point in his life. In 2014, his second book, The Most Normal in the World, was published.
