= Yair Stern (journalist) =

Israeli journalist

- יאיר שטרן
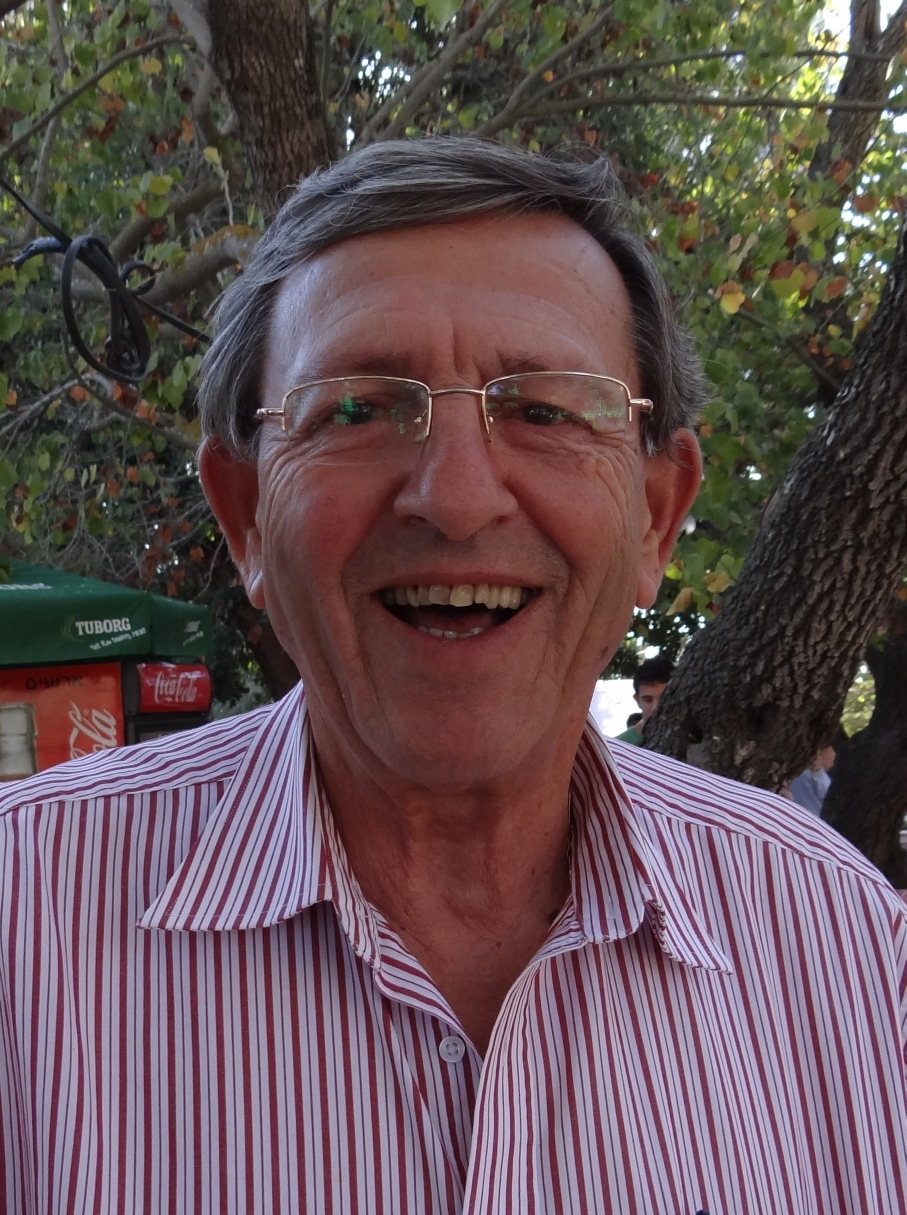
- Stern in 2011
- Born: 7 June 1942 (age 84); Tel Aviv, Mandatory Palestine
- Citizenship: Israeli
- Education: Tel Aviv University; Temple University
- Occupation: Journalism
- Relatives: Avraham Stern (father); Shay Stern (son)

Yair Stern (Hebrew: יאיר שטרן; born June 7, 1942) is an Israeli journalist and television personality.

== Early and personal life ==
Stern was born on 1942 in Tel Aviv to Roni Bronstein. His father Avraham Stern was the leader of a breakaway militant Zionist group named Lehi, who was assassinated four months before he was born. He was named after his father's underground name 'Yair'. Stern did not know about his father's death until 1948 following the Israeli Declaration of Independence.

He attended Bialik School in Netanya, School for Naval Officers in Acre and Urban High School IV in Tel Aviv. He later attended the Tel Aviv University, where he received Bachelor of Science degree in political science. Stern received master's degree in media from Temple University.

Stern is married and has four children. His son Shay is a TV producer and personality, and his daughter Anat is an academic instructor at the National Security College of Israel. He currently resides in Jerusalem.

== Journalism career ==
Although many veterans of Lehi wanted to see him continue his father's ideals, Stern turned to the field of journalism.

He began his career in the media as a sports reporter for the Maariv newspaper. After studying abroad, he returned to Israel and served as a sports reporter for Channel 1. He served in various roles on Channel 1, until the late 1980s. Stern served as a reporter in Washington, D.C. In this position, he covered the 1984 and 1988 United States presidential elections, important events in relations with the Soviet Union and the 1991 Gulf War. In 1993, he was appointed director of Israeli television.

During the Bar-On affair in Hebron, a scandal that broke out following attempts by Prime Minister Benjamin Netanyahu to replace the sitting attorney general Michael Ben-Yair, Stern protected the journalists who exposed the affair. He resigned from television and journalism career in 2000.

== Later life ==
Stern served as chairman of the Association for the Commemoration of the Lehi Heritage. In 2008, he was appointed a member of the public board of the Israeli New Film and Television Foundation. In June 2009, he was appointed interim chairman of the Jerusalem Symphony Orchestra and later that year, he was appointed general manager of the orchestra. He served in that position until May 2020.
