= There (2025 film) =

- Directed by: Ivan Petukhov
- Written by: Ivan Petukhov
- Produced by: Evgeniya Aronova; Timur Asadov; Anna Jansone
- Starring: Pyotr Fyodorov; Irina Starshenbaum; Aleksey Serebryakov; Evgeniya Dobrovolskaya; Vladislav Tiron; Stepan Devonin; Ingrid Olerinskaya
- Cinematography: Pavel Beklemishev
- Music by: Mikhail Mishchenko
- Release date: May 15, 2025 (Russia)
- Country: Russia
- Language: Russian

There (Russian: Туда) is a Russian comedy film directed by Ivan Petukhov. It stars Pyotr Fyodorov and Irina Starshenbaum. This film was theatrically released on April 22, 2025.

== Plot ==
Vadim relies on GPS and instruction while driving. Vera lives life as an adventure. Together, they set off on a journey that spans across five cities

== Cast ==
- Pyotr Fyodorov as Vadim
- Irina Starshenbaum as Vera
- Aleksei Serebryakov
- Evgeniya Dobrovolskaya
- Vladislav Tiron as Azat
- Stepan Devonin as Egor
- Ingrid Olerinskaya as Nina

== Production ==
Filming took place in Vladimir, Nizhny Novgorod, Kazan, Ufa and Moscow.
