= Aleksandr Voytinskiy =

Russian film director and producer (born 1961)

- Born: Aleksandr Sergeyevich Voytinskiy; March 11, 1961; Moscow, Russian SFSR, USSR
- Citizenship: Soviet Union (until 1991); Russia
- Occupations: Film director, screenwriter, film producer, editor, music producer, composer
- Known for: Founder of Zveri, co-founder of t.A.T.u.

Aleksandr Sergeyevich Voytinskiy (Russian: Александр Сергеевич Войтинский; born March 11, 1961) is a Russian film director, screenwriter, producer, editor, music producer, and composer. He is the founder of the rock band Zveri and a co-founder of the pop group t.A.T.u.

== Biography ==
Voytinskiy graduated from the Plekhanov Russian University of Economics with a degree in labor economics.

In 1989, together with Sergey Trofimov, Timur Bekmambetov, and Dmitry Yurkov, he co-founded a film company specializing in television advertising. The group significantly influenced the development of Russian advertising, notably creating the campaign World History for Imperial Bank in collaboration with Video International.

In the early 1990s, Voytinskiy met advertising executive Ivan Shapovalov. In 1999, they co-founded the music group t.A.T.u., but Voytinskiy soon left the project, citing his unwillingness to build it around scandal.

In 2000, he became a full member of the Russian Academy of Advertising.

In 2001, Voytinskiy founded the band Zveri together with vocalist Roman Bilyk (Roma Zver). From 2003 to 2008, he directed the band’s music videos.

At the 2004 MTV Russia Music Awards, the video “Vsyo, chto tebya kasaetsya” won Best Music Video of the Year; Zveri was named Best Group, and Roma Zver Best Artist. That same year, Zveri represented Russia at the MTV Europe Music Awards in Rome.

In 2008, Voytinskiy joined the film company Bazelevs. He co-directed Russia’s first superhero film, Black Lightning (2009), with Dmitry Kiselyov, which grossed approximately $22 million.

In 2009, he served as director and creative producer of the first film in the Yolki franchise.

On March 11, 2011, Voytinskiy, Mikhail Vrubel, and Alexander Andryushchenko founded the production company Molniya Pictures.

In 2017, he directed the second season of the television series The Method.

== Personal life ==
Voytinskiy is divorced and has three sons: Alexander (born 2001), Daniil (2008), and Matvey (2019).

== Filmography ==
Year	Title	Notes
2009	Black Lightning	Co-directed with Dmitry Kiselyov
2010	Yolki	Segment director
2012	Jungle	
2015	Ghost	
2016	Santa Claus. Battle of the Magi	
2020–2021	The Method	Television series, season 2
2023	Wish of the Fairy Fish	
2024	Ochevidnoye neveroyatnoye	
2024	The Enchanted Tinderbox	
2025	Everything That Concerns You	
2025	Yaga on Our Heads	
