= Zev Golan =

Israeli historian

Zev Golan (Hebrew: זאב גולן) is an Israeli historian and Senior Research Fellow at the Jerusalem Institute for Market Studies, where he was previously Director of the Public Policy Center. His books include God, Man and Nietzsche: A Startling Dialogue Between Judaism and Modern Philosophers (iUniverse, 2007)
