= Shoshana Borochov =

Jewish journalist and spouse of Thomas James Wilkin

- שושנה בורוכוב
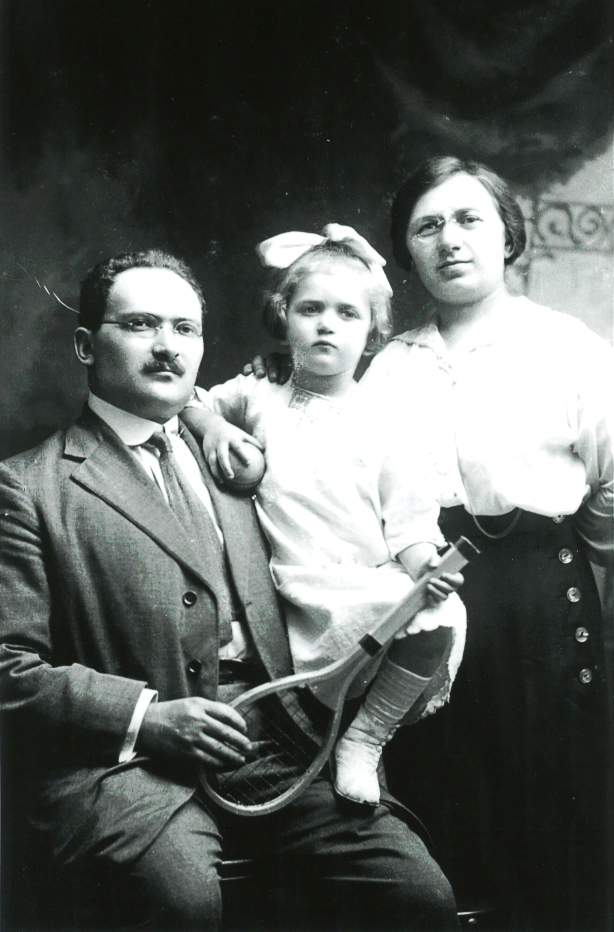
- Shoshana Borochov aged four, with her parents, United States, 1916
- Born: 9 September 1912; Vienna, Austria-Hungary
- Died: 18 November 2004 (aged 92); Karmiel, Israel
- Occupations: Writer, journalist
- Spouses: Thomas James Wilkin (partner, until 1944); Arthur Strauss (m. 1945)
- Children: Rachel Strauss Mishal
- Parents: Ber Borochov (father); Lyuba Borochov (mother)

Shoshana Borochov (Hebrew: שושנה בורוכוב; 9 September 1912 – 18 November 2004) was the daughter of Ber Borochov, one of the founders of socialist Zionism. For over a decade she was married to Thomas James Wilkin, an Assistant Superintendent in the Criminal Investigation Department of the Palestine Police, who was assassinated by the Lehi on September 29, 1944.

== Biography ==
Shoshana Borochov was the daughter of Zionist activist Ber Borochov and Lyuba, daughter of a rabbinic family who studied languages at Moscow State University. Borochov and his wife lived in Vienna in 1909-1914. Shoshana was born in Vienna during that time.

In 1914, upon the outbreak of the First World War, the Borochovs fled to Italy, and from there they sailed to the United States. They lived in New York. With the outbreak of the revolution in Russia in 1917, Ber Borochov returned to Russia. After the October Revolution, in December 1917, he died in Kiev from pneumonia, when he was thirty six years old.

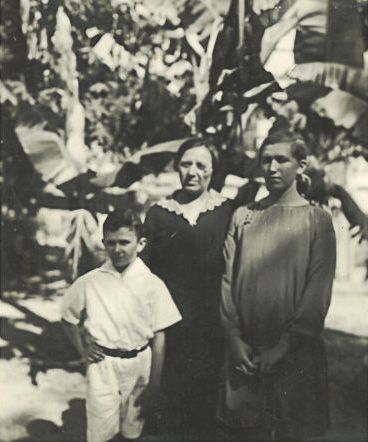
Shoshana, with her mother Lyuba and her brother David, before 1930

In 1925, Lyuba immigrated with her two children, Shoshana aged thirteen and David, to Mandatory Palestine in the framework of the Fourth Aliyah. They lived in an apartment in workers' dormitories on Dov Hoz street in Tel Aviv. For her livelihood, the mother worked first in the Zionist Executive and later in the Executive Committee of the Histadrut.

Shoshana studied at Herzliya Hebrew Gymnasium and graduated in the summer of 1930. With the help of Yitzhak Ben-Zvi, chairman of the Jewish National Council, Shoshana was hired as an office worker at HaMerkaz HaHakla'i. She also tutored children in English and wrote on women's affairs for the newspaper Davar.

At that time, the poet Alexander Penn courted her, but she rejected him due to his drinking and womanizing.

In his historical novel Red Days, published in 2006, the writer Ram Oren tells the story of Shoshana's relationship with Thomas James Wilkin, born in England in 1909. Wilkin joined the Palestine Police Force in Mandatory Palestine in 1930. Oren writes that Wilkin met Shoshana Borochov at the end of his first week serving in Jaffa. He saw her sitting at "Tarshish" cafe writing an article for Davar. He met her again in March 1933 at the Purim party held by Baruch Agadati at Eden Cinema. Wilkin asked her to dance and she agreed to teach him Hebrew. Thus began the relationship between them, which lasted eleven years until his assassination by Lehi on September 29, 1944.

In 1938, Wilkin moved to serve in the British Intelligence headquarters in Tel Aviv. As an officer who had mastered Hebrew, Wilkin was considered a dangerous enemy, especially by the underground organizations who recognized his abilities and were afraid of him. Wilkin was involved in investigations and torture of the Irgun and Lehi members, and in raiding the Irgun headquarters in 1939, and was the right hand of Assistant Superintendent Geoffrey J. Morton, who on February 12, 1942 shot and killed Lehi commander Avraham Stern (Yair) with a pistol.

The connection between them was widely known, and Shoshana received verbal and written threats. Her brother David was concerned because he had broadcast over the Haganah's underground radio station, and feared that Wilkin would turn him in. The director of the Agricultural Center demanded that she cut off her ties with Wilkin, and when she refused, he fired her from her job. In 1943, Wilkin moved to the Jerusalem police headquarters as the head of the Jewish department. He lived in the compound of the Romanian Orthodox Church on Shivtei Israel (Twelve Tribes of Israel) street in Jerusalem.

Lehi continued to track Wilkin in Jerusalem in revenge for the murder of Yair Stern. On September 29, 1944 they assassinated him in the heart of Jerusalem, near St. Paul's Church. Wilkin's funeral was held at the Protestant Cemetery on Mount Zion. It was attended by hundreds of police and government leaders, including Chief Secretary to the British High Commissioner for Palestine and Transjordan of the British Mandate, which was second to the High Commissioner, and Mandate Police Chief John Rymer-Jones. Among the people following his coffin was Shoshana. Arthur Frederick Giles, the Intelligence chief, gave her a silver chain that was found among Wilkin things, which she wore around her neck.

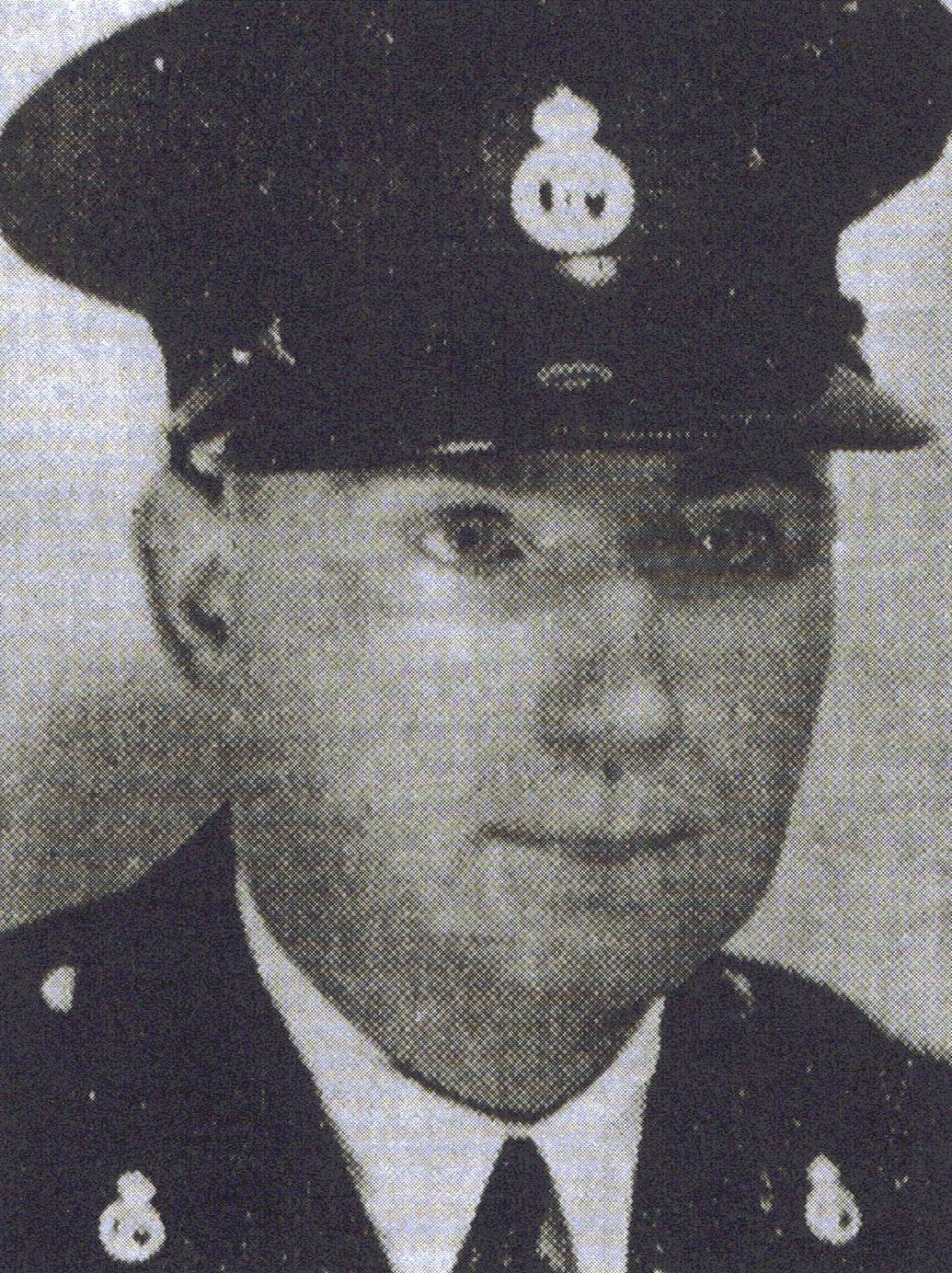
Thomas James Wilkin

After Wilkin's death, Giles suggested that Shoshana go to England to meet Wilkin's parents in Aldeburgh.

In 1945, Shoshana married Arthur Strauss, a German Jew born in 1901 who immigrated to Palestine in 1935. In 1948 they had a daughter, Rachel, who married Shaul Mishal, and they had three children. In 1984, Arthur died. In her later years, Shoshana lived in a senior home in Karmiel. At the end of 2004, Shoshana died and was buried in Metula.
