= Wish of the Fairy Fish =

- Theatrical release poster
- Directed by: Aleksandr Voytinskiy
- Written by: Alexandr Arkhipov (ru)
- Based on: At the Pike's Behest by Alexander Afanasyev
- Produced by: Sergey Selyanov (ru); Natalya Smirnova; Alexandr Gorokhov
- Starring: Nikita Kologrivyy; Mila Ershova; Alina Alekseeva; Yuri Kolokolnikov; Roman Madyanov; Fyodor Lavrov; Agrippina Steklova
- Cinematography: Vladimir Bashta
- Edited by: Serik Beyseu; Sergey Nesterov
- Music by: Sergey Luran
- Production companies: CTB Film Company; Studio Globus; CGF; STS; Russia-1; Cinema Fund
- Distributed by: National Media Group Film Distribution
- Release date: October 26, 2023 (Russia)
- Running time: 115 minutes
- Country: Russia
- Language: Russian
- Budget: ₽660 million
- Box office: ₽2.487 billion; $28.7 million

Wish of the Fairy Fish (Russian: По щучьему велению, romanized: Po shchuch'yemu veleniyu, lit. 'At the Pike's Behest') is a 2023 Russian fantasy film directed by Aleksandr Voytinskiy. Produced by CTB Film Company and Studio Globus, the film is an adaptation of the 1913s Russian fairy tale "At the Pike's Behest" by Alexander Afanasyev. The film follows other adaptations of the fairy tale including the 1938 live-action feature-length film and the 1957 animated short film of the same name filmed in the Soviet Union. The role of Emelya was embodied by Nikita Kologrivyy, the Magic Pike was voiced by Mila Ershova, the Tsar declared by Roman Madyanov, and Koshchei was played by Fyodor Lavrov. Other roles include Alina Alekseeva, Yuri Kolokolnikov and Agrippina Steklova. The principal photography took place in various locations, such as Saint Petersburg, the city of Perm, and the town of Tobolsk, Tyumen Oblast.

It was theatrically released on October 26, 2023, in Russia by National Media Group Film Distribution. The film received critical acclaim and grossed 2 billion rubles.

== Plot ==
In Ancient Russia, there was a simple Russian man named Emelya the Fool. The son of a blind blacksmith, the peasant Emelya goes fishing and catches a pike. He accidentally pulls the Magic Pike out of the ice hole with a bucket, which is being sought by the underwater tsar, Vodovik (Waterman). Arriving home, Emelya finds out that the Magic Pike talks, and she is ready to fulfill any three of his wishes in exchange for her release. Emelya spends his first wish by accident, declaring that he wants to see the city but does not want to get up from the Russian stove. The Magic Pike forces the stove to leave the hut and head to the city. Before reaching there, Emelya stops and spends his second wish, wishing for summer to come in the middle of winter, which the pike fulfills. Soon, robbers attack Emelya, but not finding anything valuable on him, they want to take possession of his pike. After a chase, Emelya throws the pike into the river, but he himself is caught and hanged upside down from a tree. Then the Magic Pike, who has turned into a girl named Vasilisa the Beautiful, frees him. Emelya takes her scales and begins to think of a third wish. In the end, he decides to marry Princess Anfisa, the daughter of Tsar Feofan.

Princess Anfisa, in turn, wants to marry the English ambassador, Lord Rothman. When the lord shows Tsar Feofan and the princess a mechanical organ (actually powered by a dwarf sitting inside), the tsar says that they have a better thing—a self-playing accordion. The lord asks to see it, and then Emelya volunteers to get it, asking for marriage with Anfisa as a reward. With the help of Vasilisa, Emelya finds the owner of the button accordion—the cat Bayun, who uses a musical instrument to put people to sleep and eat them. But the magic accordion has no effect on Emelya, and the cat eventually voluntarily goes with Emelya to the palace.

Not wanting to marry a simple peasant, Anfisa turns to the ghost of her mother, Queen Agrippina, and she advises her to ask Emelya to get a self-assembling tablecloth. Vasilisa takes Emelya, with whom she falls in love, to the owners of the tablecloth—two men, one drinking and one eating. After using the magic object for a long time, they became very fat and therefore cannot leave the Stone City. Emelya, hearing their words that they are tired of such a life and that they want someone to take the tablecloth from them, comes out to them and tries to take the magic object. But the drinking man and the eating man throw a coconut at him, and he loses consciousness. Then Vasilisa asks them for spring water. They see their reflection in it, feel ashamed, and allow Vasilisa to take the tablecloth. At the last moment they change their minds, but Vasilisa manages to leave the Stone City with the tablecloth and Emelya.

Emelya brings the tablecloth to the city, which further earns the Tsar's respect. But Agrippina gives Anfisa advice to agree to the wedding on the condition that Emelya will bring her mother's blessing from the Other World. On the way, Emelya and Vasilisa visit his father, after which Emelya makes his last wish—to restore his father's sight. He returns the scales to Vasilisa and frees her, but she still continues on her way with him.

In the next world, Emelya learns that Vasilisa is Koshchei's daughter. He summons Agrippina, punished by eternal hunger. Despite refusing to give Emelya a blessing, he teases her with food, and she eventually gives it. The tsar and Anfisa see it reflected on a tray. Koshchei releases Emelya and Vasilisa, but as a result, Emelya forgets everyone he saw in the next world, including Vasilisa. Vasilisa turns into a pike again, and Emelya returns to the city. Anfisa finds out that Emelya accomplished feats with the help of witchcraft, and he is sentenced to execution. But Vasilisa, who has again escaped from the Sea Tsar Waterman and taken on human form, offers Anfisa her service in exchange for Emelya's life. Anfisa agrees and releases Emelya. Her first wish is to make herself a queen, her second is to prepare a wedding with the English king, and to appoint Lord Rothman as a dishwasher.

Emelya returns to his father, who has sheltered a thin drinking man and a thin eating man. He accidentally remembers Vasilisa and realizes that he loves her, not the princess. The four of them come to the city and demand her release. Anfisa thinks about how to get rid of them, and in the end, she makes a wish to become a sorceress herself. She turns into a pike but learns that her new power is useless since she can only grant others' wishes. As a result, Waterman comes through the well and takes Anfisa, mistaking her for Vasilisa. She resists, but in the end, having learned that she is dealing with the tsar, she resigns herself to her fate. Feofan becomes tsar again, and Emelya and Vasilisa go on a journey.

== Cast ==
- Nikita Kologrivyy as Emelya the Fool (English: Emilio), this is a Slavic stove bed for cooking and lounging

A slacker and a blockhead who loves to lie on the stove and do nothing, so much so that he deceives his blind father, pretending to be a child.

- Mila Ershova as the Magic Pike / the girl Vasilisa

Helps her friend Emelya in every possible way in all his trials.

- Alina Alekseeva as Princess Anfisa (English: Anthea)

Active and ambitious, a lover of everything Englishman, even the girl’s outfit in a foreign style.

- Yuri Kolokolnikov as Lord Rothman

A contender for the hand and heart of Princess Anfisa.

- Roman Madyanov as the Tsar Feofan (English: the King Theophan)

Kind and tired, who is tired of running the state, he prefers a quiet life and passion for what he loves.

- Fyodor Lavrov as Koshchei
- Agrippina Steklova as Queen Agrippina

=== Voice cast ===
- Mila Ershova as the Magic Pike, voice acting
- Sergey Burunov as Bayun the Cat, voice acting (English: Croon Cat)
- Ilya Slanevsky as a frog, voice acting

=== Other cast ===
- Konstantin Topolaga as Emelya's father
- Egor Bakulin as the Sea Tsar (English: the Sea King)

The Sea Tsar Waterman (also tr. Tsar Vodovik), who wants to take a pike as his wife, in the underwater kingdom, an aquatic man peeking out of a well.

- Aleksandr Nesterov as a man drinking
- Andrey Pynzaru as a man eating food
- Dmitry Mukhamadeev as Afanasy
- Olga Miroshnikova as Maria "Marus'ka"
- Anastasia Stefanishina as Ludmila "Lyus'ka"
- Petr Chubko as a dwarf, Lord Rothman's servant
- Nikolay Kalmykov as Stepan
- Andrey Papanin as a Scotsman

== Production ==
=== Development ===
Alexander Gorokhov, a representative of the CGF Company, which created visual effects for the film Upon the Magic Roads, is responsible for the visual effects in the project.

The animated characters the Magic Pike, Bayun the Cat, Frog and Seahorses were created using CGI combination technology.

=== Filming ===
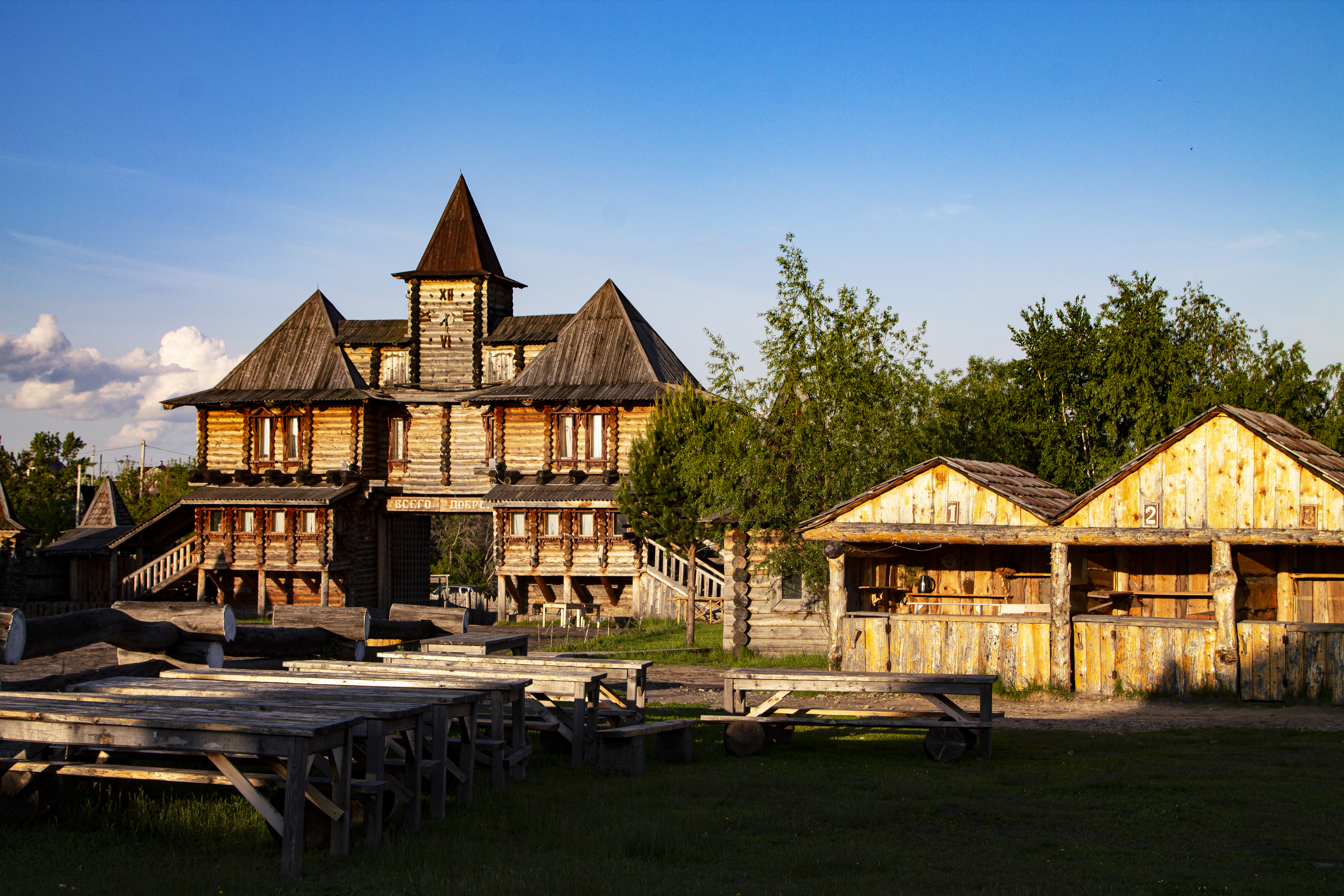
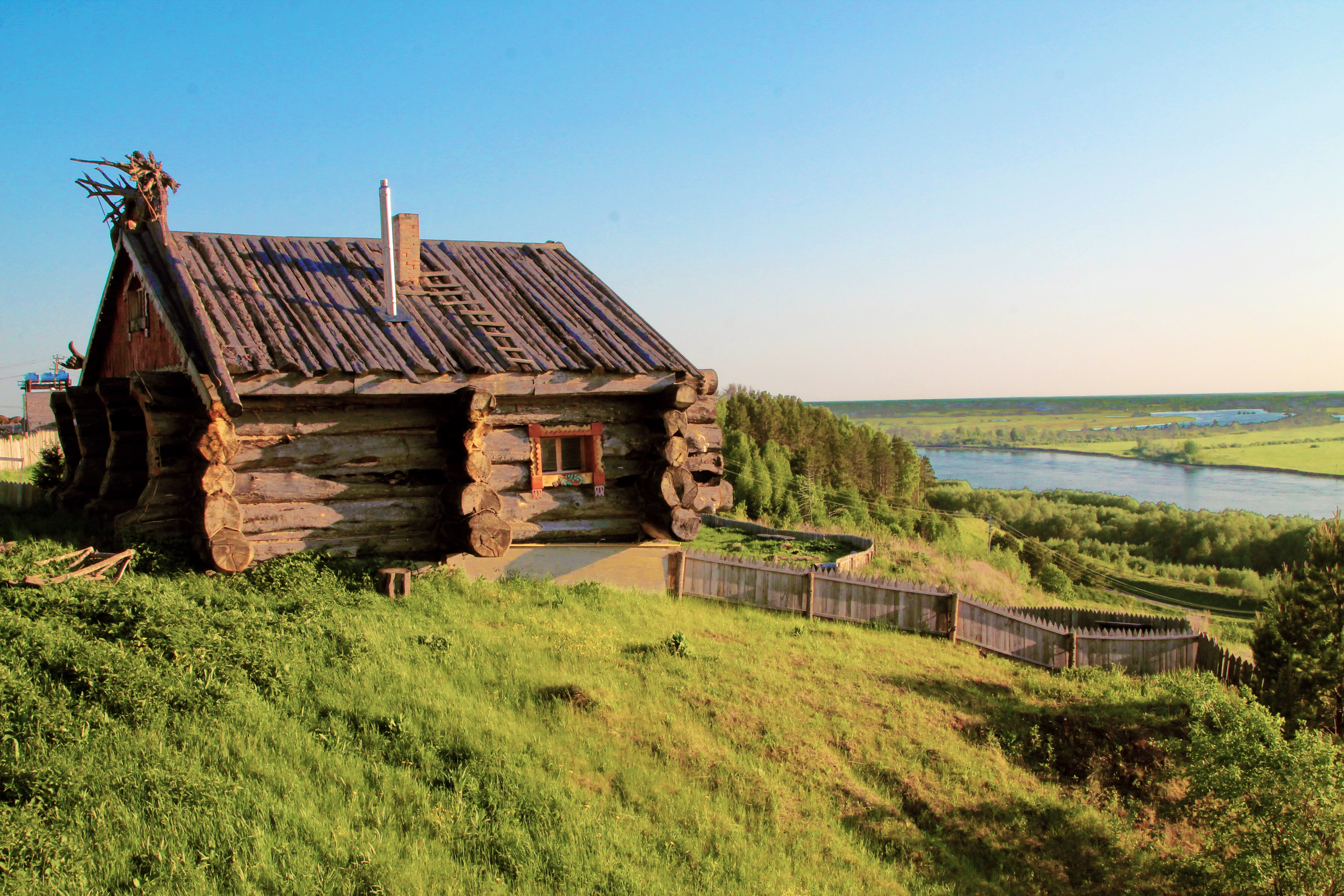
The tourist complex “Abalak”

The winter material was first shot in the selo of Abalak, Tobolsky District; The film's props were placed in the Abalak rural club, near the town of Tobolsk, Tyumen Oblast.

The spring filming has started in the Lenfilm studio pavilions in Saint Petersburg; the scenery of the royal palace was built, and within the walls of the former factory - Koschei. For filming, the decorators developed three stoves, one of which went through the entire filming period, reaching St. Petersburg. And in the summer it is scheduled to continue filming in the Tyumen region; the producers have set up a film site in the tourist complex "Abalak".

== Music ==
Composer Sergey Luran wrote 76 scores of original orchestral music for the film, which were recorded by a symphony orchestra in the first Mosfilm studio. In addition to the instruments of the symphony orchestra, Russian folk instruments were used - balalaika, double bass balalaika, domra and zhaleika.

The film also features music from the folk group "Otava Yo". Especially for the film, the group made an arrangement of the famous Cossack wedding song "It’s time for the young man to get married", which became the title song of the film, and an official video for the film was shot for it. In total, the film uses 10 original songs by the group.

== Release ==
Wish of the Fairy Fish had its world premiere at the Karo 11 October cinema center on New Arbat Avenue in Moscow on October 17, 2023. The film premiered on October 26, 2023, by National Media Group Film Distribution.

== Reception ==
=== Box office ===
During the first weekend, the film fairy tale earned more than 400 million rubles, and a week later, box office receipts exceeded a billion rubles.
