= Ber Borochov =

Founder of the Labor Zionist movement (1881–1917)

Dov Ber Borochov
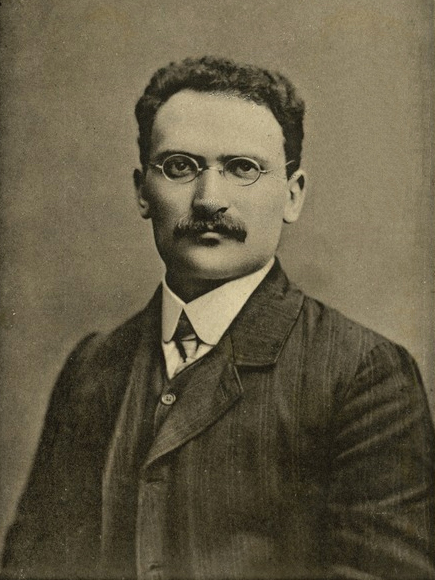
- Ber Borochov in 1910
- Born: 3 July 1881; Zolotonosha, Poltava Governorate, Russian Empire
- Died: 17 December 1917 (aged 36); Kiev, Ukrainian People's Republic
- Education: Gymnasium (school)
- Occupation: Founder of the Labor Zionist movement
- Known for: Yiddish philology
- Political party: Russian Social Democratic Labour Party; Poale Zion
- Spouse: Lyuba Borochov
- Children: 2

Dov Ber Borochov (Russian: Дов-Бер Бо́рохов; 3 July [O.S. 21 June] 1881 – 17 December 1917) was a Marxist Zionist and one of the founders of the Labor Zionist movement. He was also a pioneer in the study of the Yiddish language. His worldview was highly influenced by Alexander Bogdanov, Ernst Mach and Richard Avenarius.

== Biography ==
Dov Ber Borochov was born in the town of Zolotonosha, Russian Empire (now in Ukraine), and grew up in nearby Poltava. His mother and father were both teachers. As an adult he joined the Russian Social Democratic Labor Party but was expelled when he formed a Zionist Socialist Workers Union in Yekaterinoslav. After being arrested by the Russian authorities, he left for the United States. Subsequently, he helped form the Poale Zion (Workers of Zion) party and devoted his life to promoting the party in Russia, Europe, and America. When the Russian social democrats came to power, Borochov returned to Russia in March 1917 to lead the Poale Zion, he was also nominated as the delegate for the Poale Zion at the Conference of Nationalities to held at Kiev, but he became ill and died of pneumonia before he could attend it.

== Ideology ==
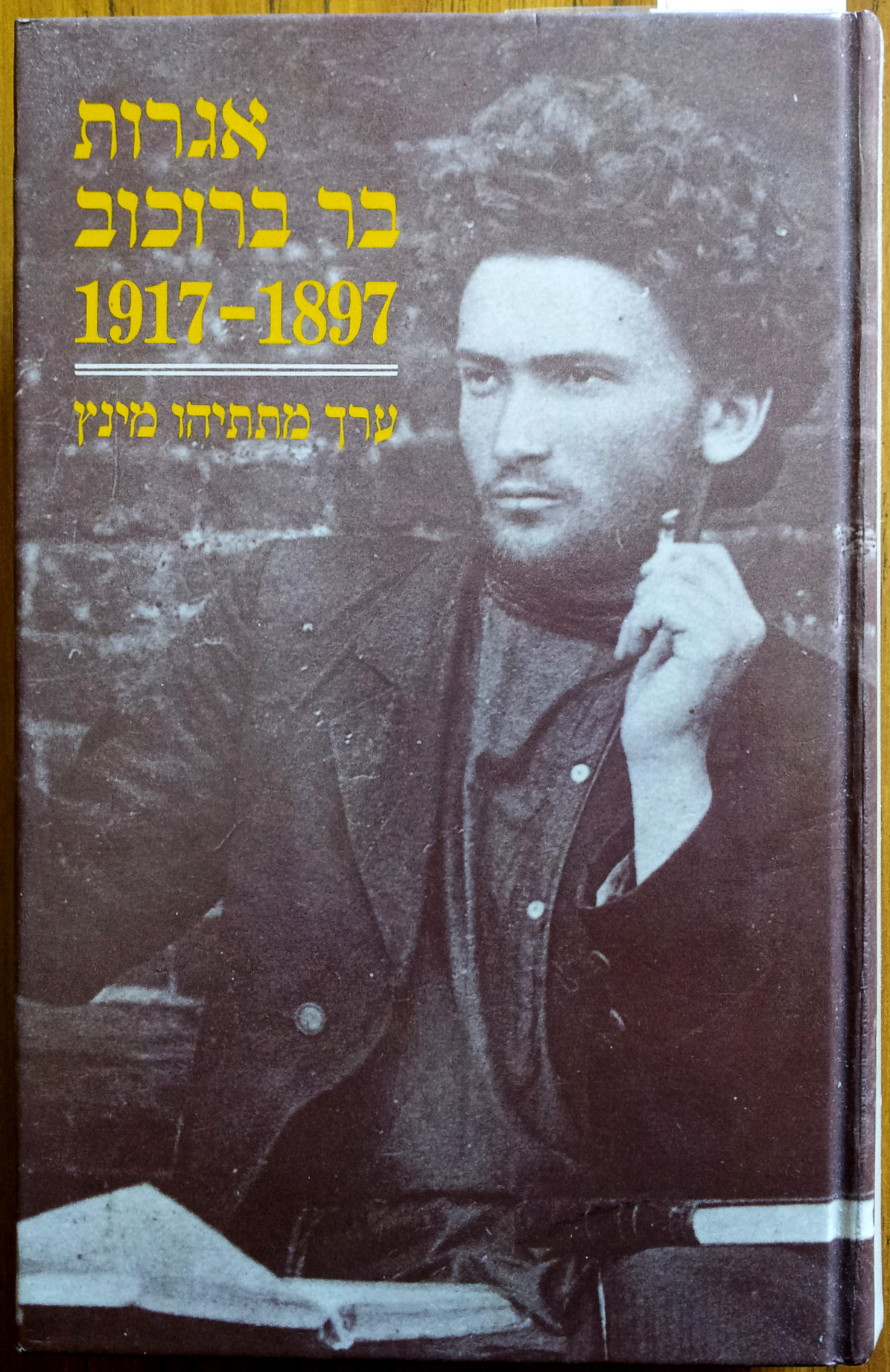
Igrot Ber Borochov (Ber Borochov letters)

Borochov became highly influential in the Zionist movement because he explained nationalism in general, and Jewish Nationalism in particular, in terms of Marxist class struggle and dialectical materialism. He saw himself as a Marxist, and he laid out his philosophy in his first major work, published in 1905, The National Question and the Class Struggle, in which he criticized capitalism. In November 1905, he joined, and soon became a leader of, the Poalei Zion movement, drafting in 1906 "Our Platform," the manifesto of the movement. In "Our Platform," Borochov attempted to answer the questions, "What is the Jewish national question?" and "What is its meaning for the Jewish working class, and how does it propose to solve it?"

Borochov predicted that nationalist forces would be more important in determining events than economic and class considerations, especially as concerned the Jews. Borochov argued that the class structure of European Jews resembled an inverted class pyramid where few Jews occupied the productive layers of society as workers. The Jews would migrate from country to country as they were forced out of their chosen professions by a "stychic process" which would ultimately force migration to Palestine, where they would form a proletarian basis in order to carry out Marxist class struggle.

He became an avid supporter of a Palestine-based Zionism following the Sixth World Zionist Congress, during which the question of Uganda as a possible temporary refuge for the Jews was debated.

A key part of Borochovian ideology was that the Arab and Jewish working classes had a common proletarian interest and would participate in the class struggle together once Jews had immigrated to Palestine. In his last recorded speech, he said:

Many point out the obstacles which we encounter in our colonization work. Some say that the Turkish law hinders our work, others contend that Palestine is insignificantly small, and still others charge us with the odious crime of wishing to oppress and expel the Arabs from Palestine...
When the waste lands are prepared for colonization, when modern technique is introduced, and when the other obstacles are removed, there will be sufficient land to accommodate both the Jews and the Arabs. Normal relations between the Jews and Arabs will and must prevail.

However, in previous writings, Borokhov imagined that the Arab inhabitants of Palestine would disappear through assimilation with the economically and culturally more advanced European settlers. In the long run, Borochov predicted that "the inhabitants of Eretz Yisra’el will adapt themselves to the economic and cultural type that seizes a dominant economic position in the country. The natives of Eretz Yisra’el will assimilate economically and culturally with whoever brings order to the country, whoever undertakes the development of the forces of production of Eretz Yisra’el." His conclusion: "It is the Jewish immigrants who will undertake the development of the forces of production of Eretz Yisra’el, and the local population of Eretz Yisra’el will soon assimilate economically and culturally to the Jews." Describing the Arab population of Palestine as living under primitive standards of civilization and economics, Borochov asserted that Jewish immigration will bring "progressive methods of labor, a higher standard of living, and a higher scale of wages."

== Influence ==
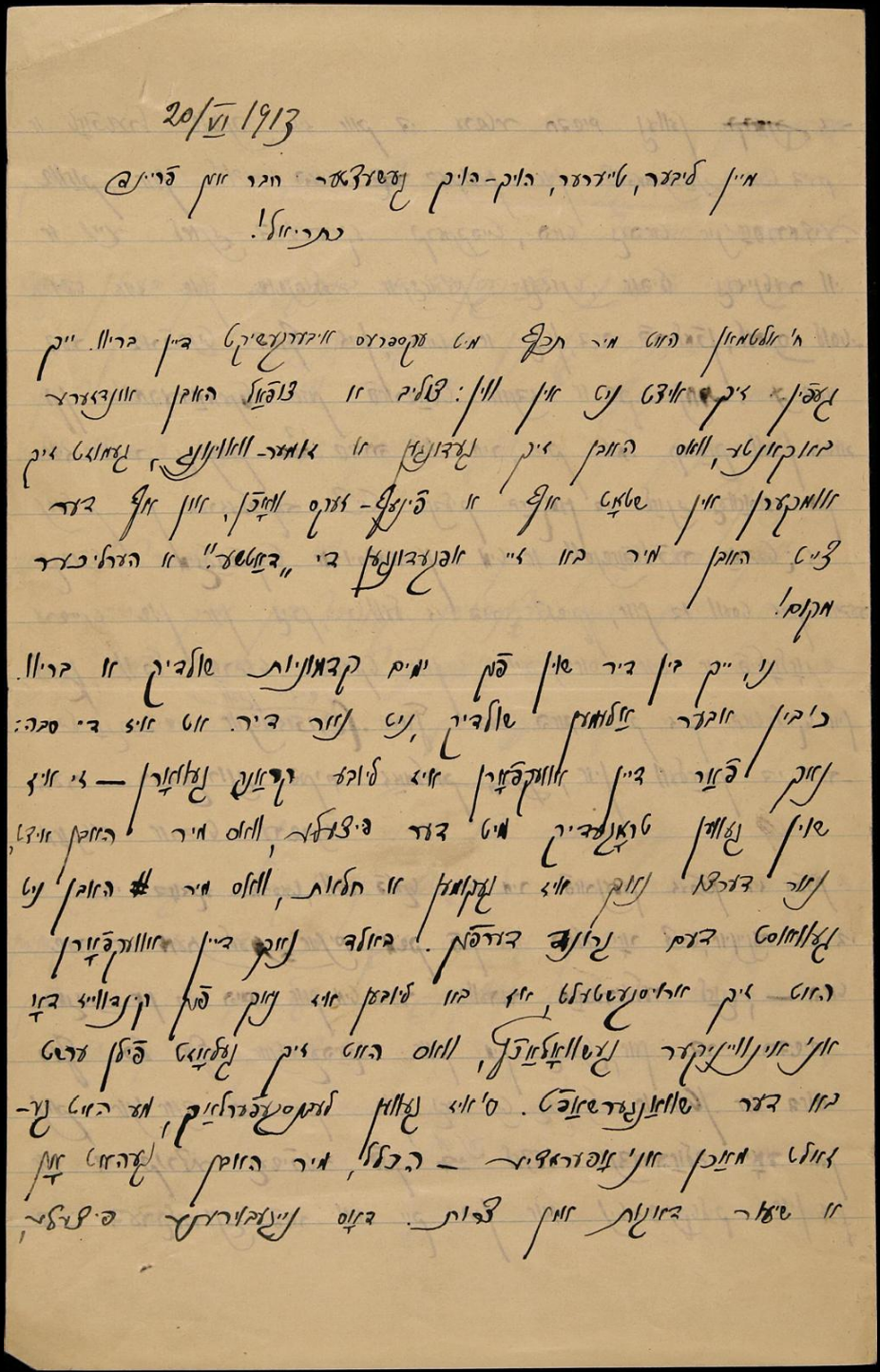
Letter from Ber Borochov to Shmuel Niger, 1913

Borochov, along with Nachman Syrkin, is considered a father of socialist Zionism. Borochov's ideas were influential in convincing Jewish youth from Europe to move to Palestine. However, Borochov's theories remained most influential in Eastern Europe, where they formed the basis of the Left Poale Zionist movement which was active in Poland during the interwar years. Indeed, Borochov's vision of class struggle in Palestine was widely viewed as untenable by the 1910s, with Jewish migrants to Palestine struggling to establish an economic foothold and with interclass cooperation seemingly necessary, and his theories dimmed in popularity there. Borochov, for years an advocate for a doctrinaire Marxist Zionism, himself seemed to repudiate his former vision of class struggle in Palestine in speeches towards the end of his life. Borochov insisted that he was a Social Democrat, but Borochov's Left Poale Zion followers continued to vigorously advocate class struggle both in Palestine and eastern Europe, supporting the February Revolution of 1917.

== Return to Russia ==
Borochov returned to Russia in August 1917 and attended the Third All-Russian Poale Zion party congress to argue for socialist settlement in Palestine. The Poale Zion conference selected Borochov as a delegate to the Conference of Nationalities, where he issued a paper describing Russia as a decentralized socialist commonwealth of nations (“Rossiia kak sodruzhestvo narodov”).

== Death and split of Russian Poale Zion ==
Borochov caught pneumonia while on a speaking tour and died in Kiev on 17 December 1917, at the age of 36. The Russian Poale Zion movement split into two factions over attitudes towards the Bolshevik Revolution of October 1917. The Poale Zion Left formed a "Borochov Brigade" to join the Red Army during the Russian Civil War and ultimately split from the main Poale Zion party to become the Jewish Communist Party (Poalei Zion) in 1919 and would go on to join the Jewish section (Yevsektsiya) of the Communist Party of the Soviet Union, while the social democratic Right Poale Zion was banned.

== Re-interment ==
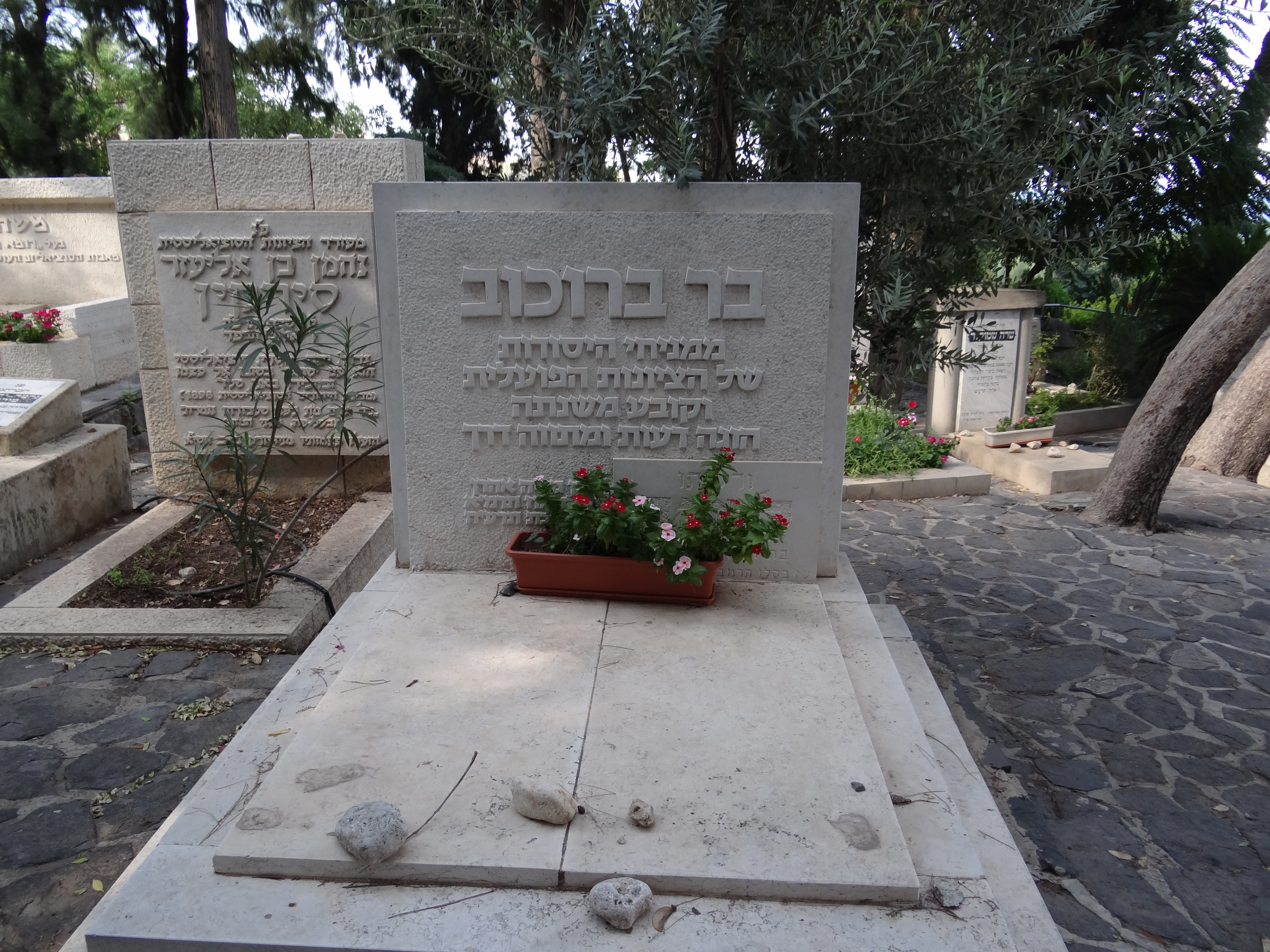
Ber Borochov grave in the Kvutzat Kinneret Cemetery

After his death in December 1917, Borochov was buried in the Lukyanovka Jewish Cemetery in Babi Yar, near Kiev. In 1954, a process to reinter the remains of notable leaders of Russian Zionism to Israel was initiated by the Association of Russian Immigrants to Israel. With the intervention of Israel's second President Yitzhak Ben-Zvi, who had been a friend of Borochov, his remains were finally brought to Israel and buried in the Kinneret cemetery, alongside many other Labor Zionist leaders, on 3 April 1963.

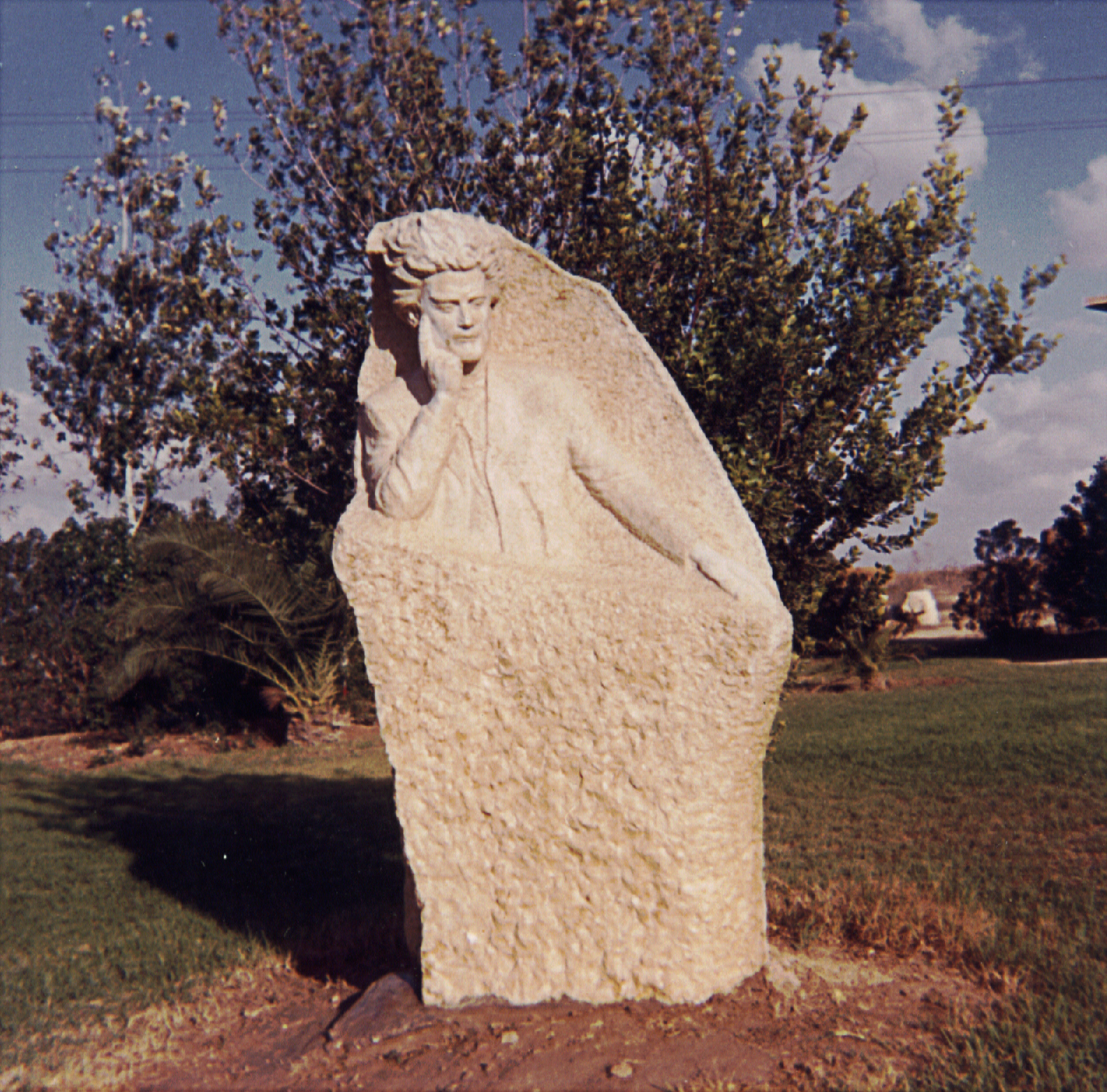
Ber Borochov statue at Kibbutz Mishmar Hanegev

== International Poale Zion ==
The international Poale Zion movement also split into left and right factions, which have evolved respectively into the modern Israeli political parties of the leftist Mapam (later Meretz) and the non-Marxist party of Ben Gurion, Mapai (the precursor of the Israeli Labor Party). The European branch of the Left Poale Zion movement was effectively destroyed by the early 1950s; many of its members were killed by the Nazis during World War II, and the surviving activists were persecuted and ultimately outlawed under the various post-war Communist regimes of Eastern Europe.

== Yiddish ==
While most Zionists regarded Yiddish as a derivative language characteristic of the Jewish diaspora and to be abandoned by the Jewish people in favor of Hebrew, Borochov was a committed Yiddishist and Yiddish philologist, and he wrote extensively on the importance of the language. He wrote a short dictionary of Old Yiddish, and was a regular contributor to the Yiddish daily newspaper, Di Warheit. Although he only began to study Yiddish at the age of 26, he is considered the founder of modern Yiddish studies.

== Legacy ==
Borochov's contributions were recognized in various ways by the early Jewish settlement in Palestine. For example, the first workers' neighborhood in the country, in what later became the city of Giv'atayim, was named after Borochov.

== See also ==
- Shoshana Borochov
- Givatayim, city whose first nucleus was the "Borochov Neighbourhood" (Shechunat Borochov), established in 1922 as the first workers' settlement in Palestine
- Hashomer Hatzair - Borochovist Zionist youth movement
- Jung Borochovistim

== Relevant literature ==
- Shabot, Leonardo Cohen. "Lectura e identidad: la teoría marxista de Ber Bórojov en el contexto del judaísmo latinoamericano (1951–1979)." Cuadernos Judaicos 29 (2012): ág-1.
- Flisiak, Dominik, Wybrane materiały ideologiczne i propagandowe Syjonistyczno-Socjalistycznej Partii Robotniczej Poalej Syjon-Hitachdut. Przyczynek do badań nad lewicą syjonistyczną w pierwszych latach powojennej Polski (1944/45-1949/50), Chrzan 2021.
