= Geoffrey J. Morton =

British police officer (1907–1996)

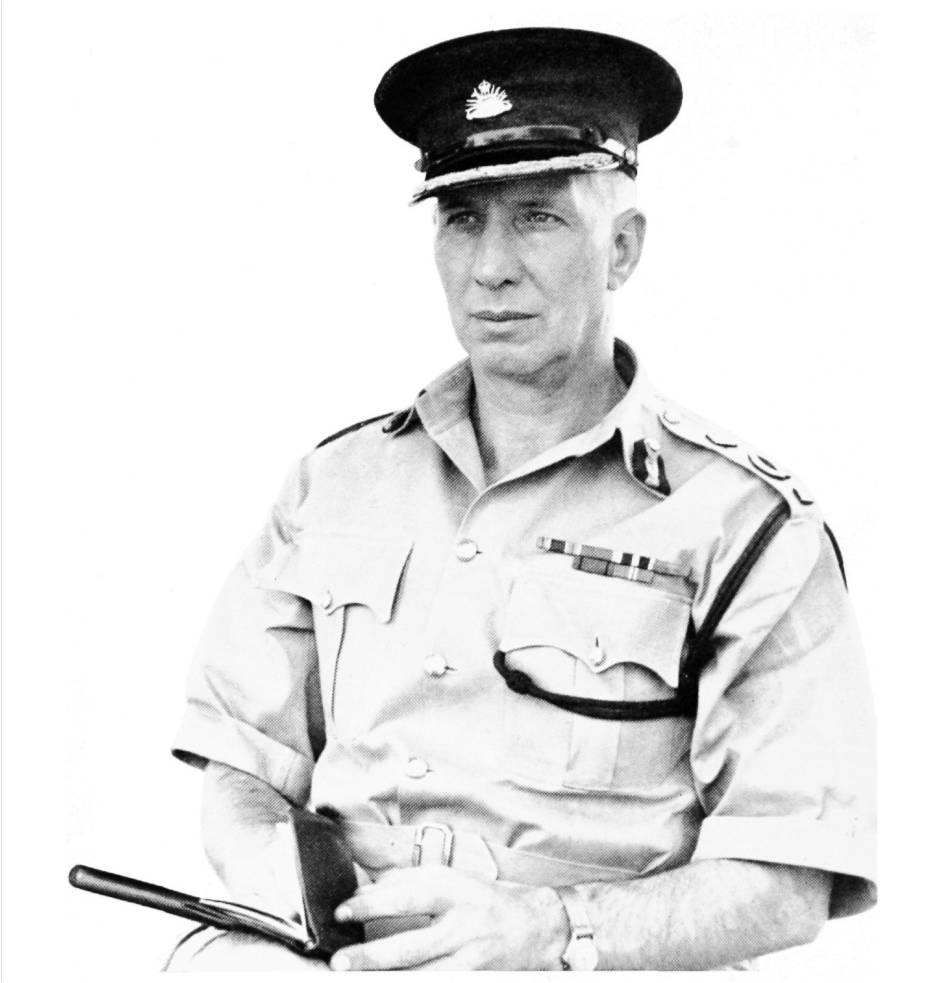
Geoffrey J Morton, Nyasaland, 1953

Geoffrey J. Morton, BEM (1907–1996) was a member of the Palestine Police, who, in two separate incidents, shot five people, three of them fatally. All five people were members of Lehi, a militant Zionist group which attempted to form an anti-British alliance with Nazi Germany and staged an insurgency against British rule in what was then called Mandatory Palestine (now Israel) during World War II, with the aim of creating an independent Jewish state. Among those killed was Avraham Stern, the leader of Lehi. The circumstances under which Morton killed Stern were disputed, and the controversy effectively ended his active police work in Palestine.

== Early life and career ==
Geoffrey Jackson Morton grew up in South London, following grammar school he began work in a dairy firm where his father was managing director, but after becoming a special constable during the General Strike of 1926 he decided on a career in law enforcement. Despite lacking the military background which recruiters preferred, Morton succeeded in joining the Palestine Police in 1930, but after passing through the army-style basic training he was assigned to a transport unit. Frustrated at the lack of opportunity for police work he left the force in 1932, rejoining six months later on hearing about changes made by Inspector General Roy Spicer.

Once Morton had passed his higher language examination in Arabic he received accelerated promotion under Spicer's patronage, reaching the (sergeant-major equivalent) rank of Head Constable at the beginning of the 1936–1939 Arab revolt in Palestine, only his steel helmet prevented a coping stone from smashing his skull during one riot in Haifa. In 1936 he was awarded the British Empire Medal, he married in 1939. By April 1938 he was an Assistant Superintendent in charge of the Jenin Division. Jenin was the hotbed of rural Palestinian resistance to British rule, along with Nablus and Tulkarm, and Bernard Montgomery praised Morton for discharging his duties effectively while showing a particular talent for rooting out arms caches, sometimes by an imaginative use of ruses which belied his rather solemn demeanor. He was noted for his coolness under fire in several skirmishes although he downplayed this by saying that Arabs were bad shots.

== The Stern Gang or Lehi ==
The leader of the right wing Zionists, Ze'ev Jabotinsky, was ambivalent about reprisals on Arabs but, in response to terrorist attacks on Jews, the Irgun launched a wave of retaliatory actions. These reached a crescendo on Sunday, 14 November 1937. As the Arab revolt wound down, Avraham Stern's faction diverged from the Irgun (which ceased operations during the war so as not to give any aid or comfort to Nazi Germany which it regarded as the greatest enemy of the Jewish people) and led his group Lehi on a campaign against Britain's rule. Stern leant heavily on examples from Jewish history such as the Zealots and Bar Kokhba, maintaining that heroism in the face of overwhelming odds would bring success. Opponents accused Stern of being overly influenced by integral nationalism and naive about the danger posed by Nazism. Stern, meanwhile, regarded war between Western democracies and Nazi Germany as "a conflict between Gog and Magog". Lehi concentrated its armed struggle on the British with Stern claiming that they were the real "enemy" rather than Germany which was a "persecutor". Stern had very little support in the wider Jewish community for his violent campaign against the British Mandate for Palestine.

The investigation into the 11 April 1938 deaths of two British policemen killed by booby trap bombs planted on a train packed with Arabs found that Avraham Stern was behind the bombing. It was the first time Morton had heard the name. Morton became head of CID in the Lyddal division covering Arab Jaffa and Jewish Tel Aviv. In one incident, he narrowly escaped death when his automatic pistol jammed during a gunfight with an Arab wanted for multiple murders, though he managed to shoot dead his opponent. Although he uncovered several large Jewish arms caches during two years in Lydda division, this had no effect on Stern's group. The austerely charismatic Stern, a poet and teacher who was referred to as "the light" by his followers, became ever more ruthless in his methods and mercilessly targeted Jewish members of the Palestine Police, regarding them as 'hirelings'. In November 1941 Ya'acov Soffioff, an off duty Jewish constable, was shot dead while walking with his wife and young daughter. The gunman was identified as Zelig Jacques, one of Stern's closest associates.

=== Yael Street bomb ===
When his military chief of staff was arrested, Stern took personal charge of operations and ordered attacks on the CID officers who were arresting his men, namely Morton and his subordinate Tom Wilkin. To this end, on 20 January 1942, a multi-stage operation was mounted. Firstly, a small explosion created the impression that there had been an accidental explosion at a Lehi bomb factory; this lured members of the Palestine Police to a Tel Aviv apartment block on Ya'el street, where they were mistakenly identified by the watching Lehi operative as including the intended targets of Morton and Wilkin. Once the policeman were on the roof of 8 Ya'el, pre-placed explosives were electronically detonated from an overlooking vantage point. Deputy Superintendent Shlomo Schiff, one of the most senior Jewish policemen (whom Lehi had tried to kill in 1941) died instantly. Inspector Nathan Goldman died the day after. Inspector E. Turton, in his first day of a job in Tel Aviv and holder of the King's Police Medal for Gallantry for saving a trainload of Jewish people from an Arab mob, had his legs amputated before dying a week later. Schiff and Goldman were due to testify against Stern gang members who had murdered two Jewish bystanders while robbing a bank official. Stern's men had also placed a third IED under the walkway to the building's entrance which was intended to target the senior officers arriving on the scene after Morton and Wilkin were killed. When Morton and Wilkin arrived in the aftermath of the rooftop bomb they were recognized by the man delegated to trigger the second IED but, contravening an order to trigger the explosion no matter how many bystanders would die, the Lehi operative did not detonate the walkway IED because of Jewish people nearby.

=== Morton's subsequent behavior when making arrests ===
The bombing deaths of his colleagues demonstrated the Stern gang's thorough knowledge of police procedures, ingenuity in coming up with novel ploys, and mastery of improvised explosive devices. The knowledge that CID men were the prime target of explosives expert zealots had a profound effect on Morton's subsequent behavior when arresting Lehi fighters. As a member of the Palestine police he had received pistol training which emphasized instinctive aiming and the danger of quick-reacting suspects; after the Yael Street bomb those who disregarded a warning to stay still during raids were not given the benefit of the doubt but instantly shot.

=== Dizengoff Street shooting ===
The authorities offered the large reward of £3000 for information leading to convictions and £1000 for the capture of Stern. One week after the bombing, on 27 January 1942, Morton learned from a Jewish informant that four young men were renting a third floor room at the rear of 30 Dizengoff Street. Morton chose speed and surprise over the delay that cumbersome reinforcements would involve and he raced to the apartment block with only five detectives. On arrival he posted three officers outside and led Wilkin and another CID man to the room. There were three men inside, relaxing after a day of exchanging information on how to make IEDs - Jacques, Avraham Amper (both leading lieutenants of Stern), and Svorai. The fourth man, Yoske, had gone to the lavatory. The noise of the door opening and a voice making a garbled inquiry about "Mr. Schiff" was taken to be Yoske returning; the three men were caught off guard when Morton threw open the door. By Morton's account, on entering he saw Jacques in front of his wife and two other men lying on beds; Morton shouted in Hebrew "Don't stand up". When the suspects did just that, he opened fire killing Jacques and Amper; Svorai received flesh wounds and Yoske was shot in the buttocks by a detective outside while attempting to escape through the lavatory window. The building is now marked by a plaque commemorating the deaths, and the last headquarters meeting of Stern (in which a plan to assassinate Oliver Lyttelton was finalized).

==== Lehi member's account of the shooting ====
According to Svorai, Morton burst in with his pistol leveled and yelled "Hands up!". As the surprised occupants got to their feet and complied, he motioned with his free hand for Wilkin and two other CID men to stay back and shot Amper in the stomach three times, Svorai in the shoulder and leg and Jacques twice in the stomach.

== The death of Avraham Stern ==
Within a couple of days a guard overheard one of the wounded suspects whispering instructions to the other suspect's mother about getting a message to the rooftop room, 8 Mizrachi Street. This was the home of Tova Svorai and in fact Stern's hiding place. Along with two other CID men, Wilkin went to search the premises on 12 February 1942; to their triumph and apparent surprise Stern was found in a wardrobe. Svorai later said she thought Stern was in danger of being summarily shot by the detective who found him, but Wilkin apparently dissuaded his subordinate from any action he had been considering. Stern was put on the couch, where a burly detective held him by the wrists until handcuffs could be brought, and the room became crowded with armed police.

=== Morton's account ===
According to Morton, on his arrival he feared there were explosives rigged to go off and had the building evacuated. Morton always insisted that Stern was not shot because he 'attempted to escape'. But, because having vowed to blow up himself and the police rather than be arrested, he had made a mad rush across the attic room despite there being no hope of getting away. Morton said that he had shot Stern dead while under the impression he was trying to reach the trigger of an explosive device. Morton was later to win at least three libel actions against those who claimed his averred reason for shooting was a pretext and that had actually murdered Stern in cold blood.

=== Other accounts ===
According to Lehi member Tova Svorai, Stern was sitting on the sofa manacled while two detectives leveled their guns at his head when Morton arrived and ordered the building cleared. She was taken down to a car, and shortly afterwards heard gunfire. Only Morton and a Constable Tennant were with Stern when he was fatally wounded. Another policeman, Bernard Stamp, later told Israel Radio that in his judgment, Stern was "killed by the police force, he was unarmed, no chance of escape." A Lehi member later alleged he had been told Morton had jerked Stern to his feet and shoved him towards a window, before shooting him in the chest. Morton successfully sued four publishers of books which claimed he murdered Stern, including the English publisher of Menachem Begin's book The Revolt.

=== Reprisals against Morton ===
Morton was given a couple of bodyguards but Stern's disciples made determined efforts to avenge their fallen leader and reportedly made at least two attempts with IEDs. The closest they came was on 1 May 1942 with a huge improvised explosive device containing sixty sticks of gelignite which was hidden in a roadside ditch. It was detonated as a car containing Morton, his wife (who worked in Jaffa as a teacher) and bodyguards passed an orange grove close to their home. Because the car had moved out to overtake a bicycle they were not caught by the full force of the blast and although their car was wrecked the occupants escaped with concussion. A few days later there was a reminder of the danger of explosives which led Morton to fear Stern gang members would blow themselves and the police up when faced with arrest; improvised explosive devices were found in the official cemetery where they had been planted in anticipation of the attendance of dignitaries from the Mandate authority at Morton's interment, had the bomb attack on his car succeeded.

In August Morton was told he had been working too hard and was to be sent on extended leave for the good of his health. On his return nearly a year later he was promoted to deputy superintendent but kept away from active service - being given work on film censorship and similar non-jobs. In death Stern, once widely disdained in the Jewish community, had begun to take on the mantle of a martyr. This change in attitude coincided with the threat from the Nazis ending with their expulsion from North Africa; the British were no longer looked on as needed. Morton was treated as an embarrassment to the authorities, especially as rumours about the circumstances in which Stern met his death were widely given credence. Less than a year after returning to Britain, Morton had no regrets about leaving Palestine for good.

== Later life ==
Morton's appointment in Palestine ended in January 1945. Later, Morton worked in Trinidad (though even there he was warned that it was likely a further attempt would be made on his life) before ending his career in 1954 as deputy police commissioner of Nyasaland. He liked Africans and Africa and this was a happy period of service although, unlike some contemporaries, he viewed the Apartheid system of South Africa with considerable distaste. Returning to England he worked in personnel and security at an engineering firm, his memoir Just the Job: Some Experiences of a Colonial Policeman was published in 1957. Morton died in London in 1996, at the age of 89; he was survived by his wife, son and a daughter.
