= Nimrud (disambiguation) =

Nimrud is an ancient city in modern Iraq.

Nimrud may also refer to:

== Places ==
- Nimrud, Iran, a village in Bezenjan Rural District, in the Central District of Baft County, Kerman Province, Iran
- Nimrud, Tehran, better known as Namrud, a village in Shahrabad Rural District, in the Central District of Firuzkuh County, Tehran Province, Iran

== People ==
- Nimrud Baito (born 1952), politician and minister in the Kurdistan Regional Government

== See also ==
- Nimrud Slab, also known as the Calah Orthostat Slab, the top half of a "summary inscription" of the reign of the Assyrian king Adad-nirari III
- Nimrud Tablet K.3751, also known as Kalhu Palace Summary Inscription 7, is an inscription on a clay tablet dated c.733 BC from the reign of Tiglath-Pileser III
- Nimrud lens, also called Layard lens, a 3000-year-old piece of rock crystal
- Birs Nimrud, an archaeological site in Babylon Province, Iraq
- Nimrod (disambiguation)
- Nemrut (disambiguation)
