= Post-Zionism =

Idea that Zionism fulfilled its ideological mission with the establishment of Israel

Post-Zionism is the opinion of some Israelis, diaspora Jews and others, particularly in academia, that Zionism fulfilled its ideological mission with the formation of the modern State of Israel in 1948, and that Zionist ideology should therefore be considered at an end. The Jewish right also use the term to refer to the Israeli Left in light of the Oslo Accords of 1993 and 1995. Some critics associate post-Zionism with anti-Zionism.

== Hebrew Universalism ==
Hebrew Universalism is a post-Zionist philosophy developed initially by Rav Abraham Kook and expanded upon by Israeli settler activist Rav Yehuda HaKohen, as well as the Vision Movement.

The philosophy attempts to synthesize "three forces" defined by Kook in his 1920 book, Lights of Rebirth. The three forces being: "The Holy" (Orthodox Jews), "The Nation" (secular Jewish Zionists), and "The Humanist" (General Humanism). Kook believed that through his philosophy anti-Zionists, Orthodox Jews, and secular nationalists could work together in Israel.

The current ideology, as espoused by the Vision Movement and HaKohen, draws inspiration from Natan Yellin-Mor, Rav Abraham Kook, Canaanism, Avraham Stern, anti-Zionist critics, and the left wing Semitic Action group.

== Criticism ==
Post-Zionism has been criticized by Shlomo Avineri as a polite recasting of anti-Zionism, and therefore a deceptive term. Some right-wing Israelis have accused Jewish post-Zionists of being self-hating Jews.

== See also ==
- Antifa (Israel)
- Category:Post-Zionists
- Canaanism
- Critical theory
- Deconstruction
- Historical revisionism
- Postnationalism
