= Nathan Yellin-Mor =

Israeli politician (1913–1980)

- נתן ילין-מור
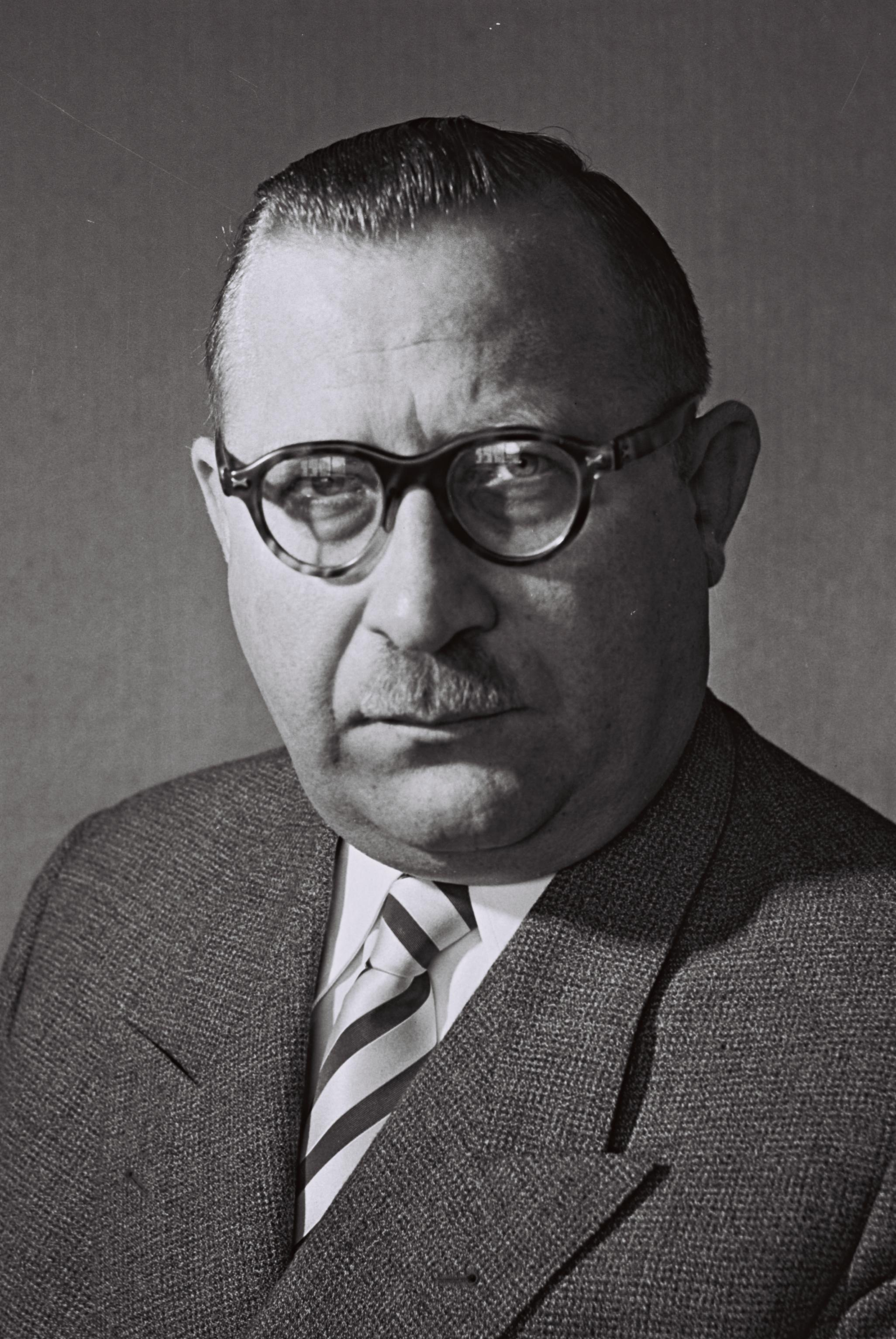

Faction represented in the Knesset
- 1949–1951: Fighters' List

Personal details
- Born: 28 June 1913 Grodno, Russian Empire
- Died: 18 February 1980 (aged 66) New York City, New York, United States

Military service
- Military service: Leader of Lehi (1942-1948)

Nathan Yellin-Mor (Hebrew: נתן ילין-מור, Nathan Friedman-Yellin; 28 June 1913 – 18 February 1980) was an Israeli political activist, one of the leaders of the militant Zionist paramilitary group Lehi, Canaanite ideologue, and politician. In later years, he became a leader of the Israeli peace camp, a Communist and pacifist who supported negotiations with the Palestine Liberation Organization and concessions in the Israeli-Arab conflict.

As the leader of Lehi, he rejected the Zionist movement and instead formulated a new ideology with the goal of Jewish re-indigenization, unity of all Middle Eastern peoples, and the absolute rejection of Western imperialism. This was to be carried out through his "neutralization of the Middle East" policy. Yellin-Mor also promoted Jewish-Arab cooperation against the British and sent out several Arabic publications calling for cooperation in combating Western powers in the region. He believed the conflict with the Palestinians would not devolve into a race war and instead be seen as Jewish paramilitaries reacting in self defense and to restore civil order.

== Biography ==
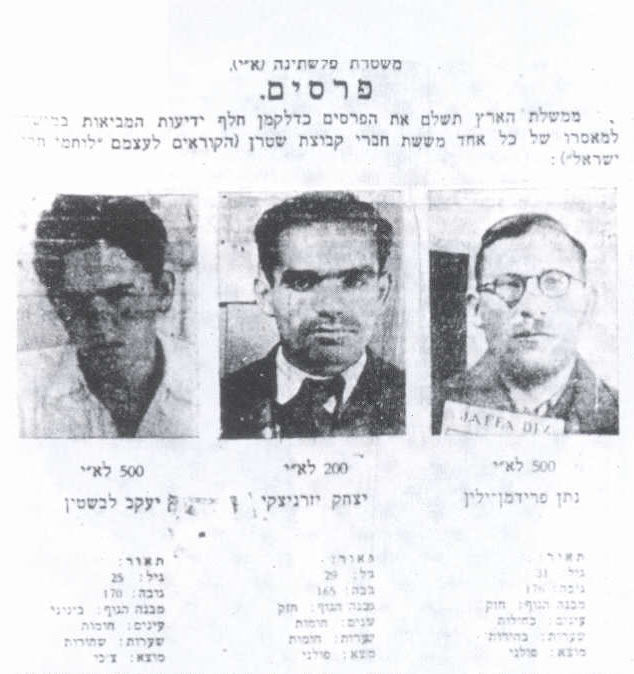
Police poster offering rewards for the capture of Stern Gang members: Jaacov Levstein (Eliav), Yitzhak Yezernitzky (Shamir), and Natan Friedman-Yelin

Nathan Friedman-Yellin was born in Grodno in the Russian Empire (now Belarus). His father was a builder who was killed after getting drafted into the Russian Army during World War I. Following his father's death, his family moved to Lipsko, where he went to public school He studied engineering at the Warsaw Polytechnic. He was active in Betar and Irgun in Poland.

Between 1938 and 1939, he was the coeditor, along with Avraham Stern (Yair), of Di Tat ("The Action "), the Irgun's newspaper in Poland.

== Activism ==
He immigrated clandestinely to the British Mandate of Palestine and joined Lehi, a Jewish paramilitary group, Lohamei Herut Yisrael (Hebrew acronym LHI - in English, Fighters for the Freedom of Israel; derogatorily called by the British the Stern gang) where he operated under the name "Gera".

In December 1941, Yair Stern assigned Yellin-Mor to travel to Turkey and the Balkans to recruit Jews living there for the underground in Palestine. He was arrested near Aleppo, Syria, and brought back to Palestine, where the British first held him at the Mizra detention camp and then transferred him to Latrun. There, Yellin-Mor masterminded the construction of a tunnel 75 metres (246 ft) in length over a period of eight months, with the debris from tunneling dumped on a garden tended by prisoners; on November 1, 1943, he escaped together with 19 comrades. After Stern's murder, he became a member of Lehi's guiding triumvirate, with Israel Eldad as chief of propaganda and Yitzhak Shamir as chief of operations. Yellin-Mor was in charge of Lehi's political activities.

Nathan Yellin-Mor (center) and Matityahu Shmueliwitz in front of the Acre Prison, after their release in 1949

He was one of the planners of the assassination of Lord Moyne in 1944. He saw the struggle against the British in an international context and advocated collaboration with other anti-colonialist forces, including Palestinian and other Arab forces. After the Deir Yassin massacre, he privately confronted Eldad. After the assassination in September 1948 of United Nations mediator Count Folke Bernadotte, he was arrested along with Lehi member Matityahu Shmuelevitch and charged with leadership of a terrorist organization. They were found guilty on January 25, 1949, the day on which Yellin-Mor was elected to the Knesset. On February 10, 1949, Yellin-Mor was sentenced to 8 years' imprisonment. Though the court was confident that Lehi was responsible for Bernadotte's death, it did not find sufficient evidence that the Lehi leadership had sanctioned the murder. The court offered to release the defendants if they agreed to certain conditions, including forswearing underground activity and submitting to police supervision, but they rejected the offer. However, the Provisional State Council soon authorized their pardon.

== Political career ==
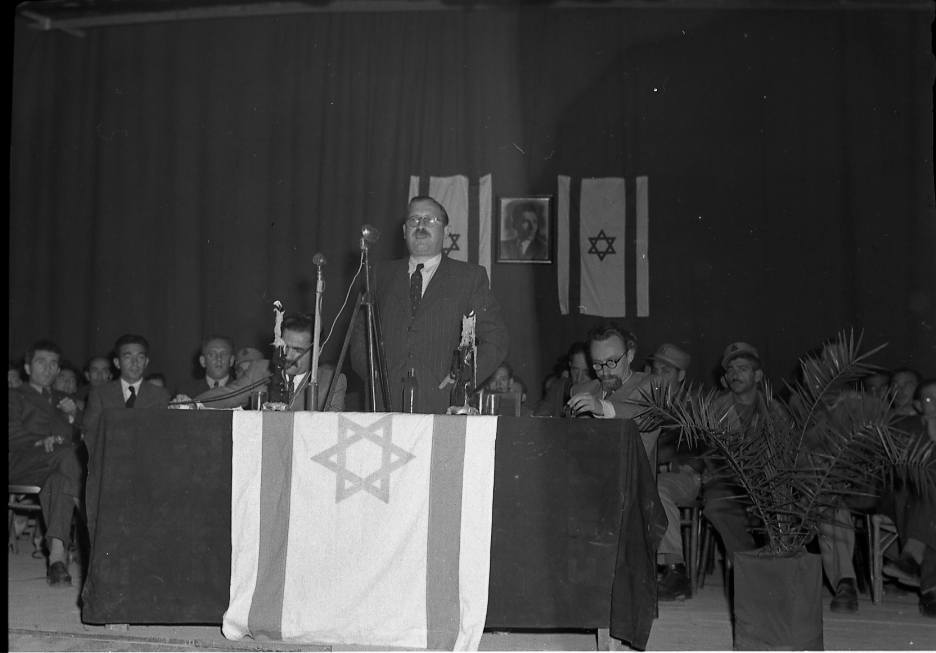
Yellin-Mor speaking at a meeting of the Fighters' List in Tel Aviv-Yafo on February 24, 1949.

In 1948, Yellin-Mor formed the nationalist political party, the Fighters' List, one of the few parties in Israel that had both Jewish and Arab candidates on its Knesset list.

He was elected in the 1949 election to the first Knesset as the leader and only representative of the Fighters' List, a political party that was created by former Lehi members. He served from 1949 to 1951 and was a member of the Internal Affairs Committee.

In 1949, he denounced the Partition of Palestine as "bartering with the territory of the homeland" and opposed the Palestinian right of return. Later, he moved increasingly to the left, in a return to the pro-Soviet position of some Lehi militants in the 1940s, by advocating a pro-Soviet foreign policy. In 1956 he helped found the group Semitic Action, whose journal Etgar ("Challenge") he edited.

== Ideology ==
As the leader of Lehi, Yellin-Mor began shifting Lehi towards a more National Bolshevik platform, synthesizing Revisionist Zionist beliefs with a uniquely indigenous form of left wing nationalism. Aside from National Bolshevism, inspirations of this new ideology included Titoism, Irish republicanism, Maximalism, nationalistic Egoism, Stalinism, Maoism, and Italian fascism.

In a letter to Israel Eldad, Yellin-Mor stated the following regarding the ideology of Lehi:

We must stress with great emphasis that we are not a Zionist movement. Zionism is empty of all content and no longer compels us forward to accomplish anything more. We are not a Zionist option, and it is not our duty to bring this or that party back to the proper path. We are the Hebrew liberation movement in the Land of Israel. For us, Zionism is dead and we no longer wish to busy ourselves trying to revive it or anything else of its kind.

In 1956, Yellin-Mor, along with Boaz Evron, Uri Avnery, Shlomo ben Shlomo, Ya'akov Yardor, and others founded the left wing Canaanite group, Semitic Action, in part due to their opposition to Israel's alliances with Britain and France during their Second Israeli-Arab War. In 1958, the group published "The Hebrew Manifesto" which "advocated that Hebrew-speaking Israelis cut their ties with the Jewish diaspora and integrate into the Middle East as natives of the region based on an anticolonialist alliance with its indigenous Arab inhabitants." and the establishment of a Palestinian state alongside Israel.

During the Algerian War for Independence, Yellin-Mor helped establish the Committee for a Free Algeria and contacted Algerian National Liberation Front fighters, who inquired about possibly receiving aid from Lehi veterans.

In the aftermath of the Six-Day War, Natan became a staunch peace activist, calling for the return of territory captured by Israel and the establishment of a Palestinian state. He began working with the Israeli Communist Party and signing petitions against the actions of the Israeli military in the occupied territories.

Due to his shift to a peace activist, he became estranged from some former Lehi members, such as Israel Eldad. In contrast, Yitzhak Shamir remained his close friend for the rest of his life.

Yellin-Mor in response to the confusion from the public and his former comrades on his transition from far right extremism to far left peace activism stated on September 9, 1974, in a letter to journalist Yossi Ahimeir:

In my opinion, every person must always fight for the cause he sees as central to the life of his society. More than thirty years ago I believed with all my heart that the achievement of freedom, independence and political sovereignty was the determining factor for our future. I was sure that if we failed in this mission, there would be no revival of our people, not in Israel or the Diaspora ... I therefore would have given my life to achieve this greater goal. We succeeded. We have in our hands the tool to do much for our future. On the condition that this achievement is not a brief episode. I therefore believe, once again, with all my heart, that in our time, the greatest and most sacred goal is to register the existence of the State of Israel as a fact, acceptable to the world, an indisputable fact. This we can achieve only through peace with our neighbors, through a historic reconciliation with them. For the achievement of this goal, – on which I believe, the life of my people and country depends – I am willing to sacrifice a great deal, as I was then ...Therefore it is not I who must answer the question, why do I follow the path I follow. Others, must answer: Why have their brains become overgrown with rust? What has polluted their minds? Why has their understanding frozen in time?

== Religion ==
In his years as a left-wing activist, Yellin-Mor became intensely secular and published anti-religious articles in The Algemeiner Journal. Editor Gershon Ber recommended that Natan meet Lubavitcher Rebbe Menachem Mendel Schneerson. The Rebbe had reportedly read many of Yellin-Mor's articles and was impressed with his literary talent, remarking:

When God blesses someone with a talent such as yours, one must utilize it to the fullest. This is a divine calling, and an immense responsibility. It is your God-given power and duty to make full use of your capacity to reach out to others and influence them with your writing.

After Natan's death, Gershon Ber published the atheistic articles in The Algemeiner with a note authored by Yellin-Mor before his death that read:

My dear reader, as you read this article, I am standing before the heavenly court being judged for all the actions I took and the choices I made in the course of my life. No doubt, I will be severely judged for living a life totally antithetical to anything Jewish. In fact, I have severe doubts that I will even be allowed to speak in my defense. This is why I asked your editor to print this now, as I stand before the heavenly court, in the hope that what is being read and discussed at this moment on earth will attract the attention of the Supernal Judge. For I have one merit which I want to present to the court in the face of all my failings and transgressions. The Rebbe said to me," he concluded, "that I have a G-d-given talent, and that it is my sacred duty to utilize it to influence others. This I did to the best of my ability, however misguidedly. This is the only merit I can claim; may it lighten the destiny of my soul....

== Final years and death ==
In his later years, he dedicated himself to working for reconciliation with the Palestinians, promoting negotiations with the Palestine Liberation Organization.

In the late 1970s, he got sick with leukemia, and an awards ceremony was hosted at his house the day before his death. A street in Montefiore neighborhood in Tel Aviv is named after him.

== Ideological successors ==
Semitic Action was revived in early 2011 as a grassroots peace movement by activists seeking what they call "a revolutionary alternative to foreign-backed organizations that only exacerbate local frictions and bring the peoples of our region further from genuine peace."

The new Semitic Action describes itself as "an Israel-based movement seeking to unite the indigenous peoples of the Middle East against the devastating influence of foreign powers in our region and the local conflicts created by the pursuit of their interests". Since its resurrection, the movement has organized meetings between Palestinians and Israeli settlers in the West Bank, initiated campaigns to raise support for an independent Kurdistan and promoted a unified front of indigenous peoples against foreign political influences in the Middle East. The movement has also been vocal against westernization, globalization, pro-Israel support from the American Christian right, Islamophobia in Israeli society, capitalism and the funding of local political organizations by foreign governments.

The VISION Movement, which subscribes to the ideology of Hebrew Universalism, also draws inspiration from Natan Yellin-Mor and other Lehi veteran ideologues.

== Published works ==
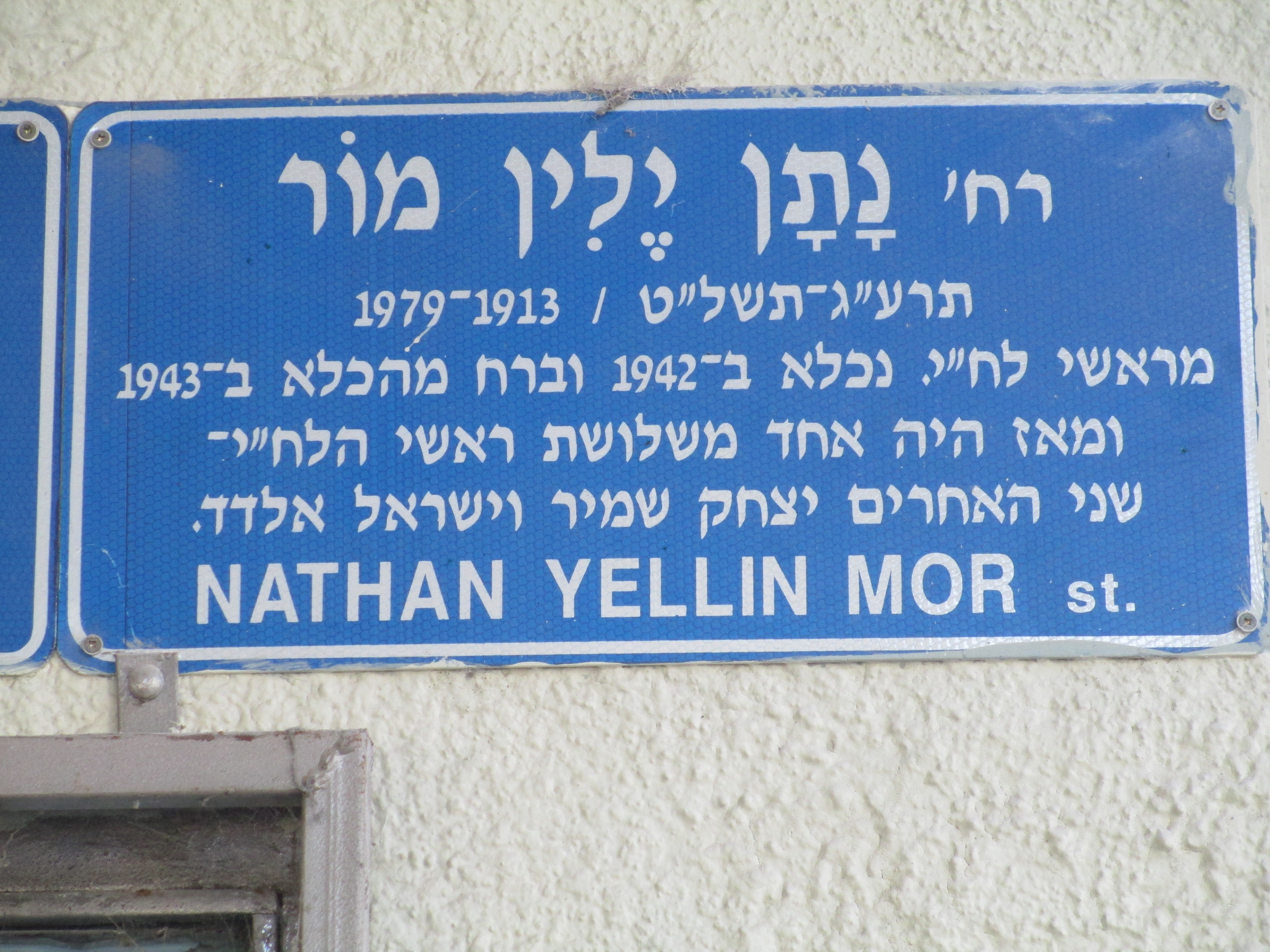
Nathan Yellin-Mor St. in Tel Aviv

- Yellin-Mor, Nathan (1974). Fighters for the Freedom of Israel – Personalities, Ideas, and Adventures (in Hebrew). Jerusalem: Shiḳmonah.
- Yellin-Mor, Nathan (1990). Shnot BeTerem (in Hebrew). Tel Aviv: Kinneret. ISBN 978-965-286-237-2.
