= Nimrodel =

Nimrodel may refer to:

- Nimrodel (river), in J. R. R. Tolkien's legendarium
- "Nimrodel", a song by Camel on the 1974 album Mirage

== See also ==
- Nimrod (disambiguation)
