= Alliance for New Zionist Vision =

- ברית חזון
- Abbreviation: ANZV
- Type: Jewish political movements
- Website: http://newzionistvision.org/

The Alliance for New Zionist Vision (ANZV; Hebrew: ברית חזון) is a coalition of grassroots educational and activist movements that ran in the 2015 American Zionist Movement elections for the 37th World Zionist Congress with the stated goals of making Zionism relevant to Jewish young adults, improving pro-Israel advocacy on North American university campuses, identifying the next major goals of Jewish history and giving a voice at the official Zionist movement to young activists on the front lines of Jewish social and political struggles. The ANZV was the only slate in the 2015 WZC elections exclusively running young adult candidates with activist backgrounds. The alliance comprises LAVI, Kumah and Doreinu.

== Positions ==
The ANZV views Zionism as a revolutionary movement boasting momentous achievements (revival of the Hebrew language, ingathering Jewish exiles, liberating Palestine from British rule, establishing a political state, etc.) but having accomplished very little since the 1967 Six-Day War. ANZV leaders claim that Zionism has lost its revolutionary momentum and is no longer relevant or exciting to Jewish young adults. The movement emphasizes the need to advance Jewish history and criticizes what it refers to as the "outdated paradigms" it sees as standing in the way of identifying the next goals of Jewish liberation. During the course of its campaign for the WZC elections, the ANZV challenged Zionism's traditional paradigms by taking strong ideological positions superficially associated with the far left and right of Israel's linear political spectrum.

“...the ANZV aspires toward Semitic unity, with a strong Jewish and democratic Israel from the river to the sea existing as an organic part of the greater Middle East. Our partners in the territories work to facilitate dialogue between those Israelis and Palestinians actually living the respective aspirations of their peoples. Israel’s peacemakers cannot be European-funded NGOs or those who would like to see Israel as a Western outpost in the Middle East, but rather those Jews who actually wish to create an authentic Hebrew society fulfilling the ancient dreams of the Jewish people..." (ANZV delegate Leah Karchmer)

"In order to effectively advance Jewish history to the next stage, those most committed to Jewish liberation have an obligation to examine our own ideological foundations, national aspirations, past achievements and current challenges in order to properly apply our ideological foundations to the current challenges within the context of our aspirations and what has already been achieved. We cannot be satisfied with outdated paradigms of previous generations but must create a new Zionist vision relevant to today." (ANZV website)

== Objectives ==
Throughout its campaign, the ANZV spoke of the need to inspire Jewish students to see themselves as active participants in the story of their people, responsible for defining and achieving Zionism's next goals. LAVI, the ANZV's senior partner, currently runs several educational initiatives along these lines and hopes to sway the World Zionist Organization's Department of Diaspora Education to adopt its programs and methods.

One of the major ANZV messages that attracted widespread attention and criticism from some circles was the insistence that Jews must cease trying to identify as white people and that the State of Israel must stop trying to present itself as a Western nation. The ANZV attacked what it called Israel's insistence on trying to be part of the West as being the primary psychological barrier to peace with Palestinians and the broader Middle East. LAVI activist Hila Hershkoviz posted a series of blogs during the ANZV campaign encouraging Israelis and Diaspora Jews to embrace a Semitic identity.

LAVI views many of the current challenges confronting the Jewish people – especially within the State of Israel – as resulting from the fact that many of our people have been conditioned to disregard their authentic Semitic identities in exchange for a desire to become part of the West. In addition to the many negative sociological implications this has had for Israeli society and the broader Jewish world, it also allows our enemies to portray Zionism as a European colonialist project and Israel as an illegal settler state. We therefore fight for recognition of the Jewish people as an indigenous people to the Land of Israel and work to promote a Middle Eastern self-identification amongst Jews as part of a broader effort to “decolonize Jewish identity.” (LAVI website)

During the campaign, LAVI leaders Hila Hershkoviz and Leah Karchmer often clashed on the Blogosphere with figures associated with the rival Hatikvah slate over issues pertaining to Jewish identity and Israeli policies.

The ANZV has also expressed several criticisms of Israel advocacy on American campuses and Jewish education, both its high cost and low quality, in the United States. The alliance advocates shifting educational efforts to focus on and promote Jewish peoplehood, Semitic identity and indigeneity to the Middle East. The group also supports the WZO subsidizing Jewish education in the Diaspora in order to ensure every Jewish child have access to his own culture, history and identity, regardless of socio-economic factors.

== See also ==
- VISION movement
- Yehuda HaKohen
