= Nemrut =

Nemrut or Nemrud may refer to:

- Mount Nemrut, in southeastern Turkey
- Nemrut (volcano), in eastern Turkey
  - Lake Nemrut
- Mustafa Yamulki (1866–1936), also known as "Nemrud" Mustafa Pasha, Kurdish military officer
- Nemrud, a 1979 Turkish film featuring Ali Şen

== See also ==
- Nimrud (disambiguation)
- Nimrod (disambiguation)
- Nemrut Bay, a port in Turkey
