= Rudy Rochman =

Israeli activist (born 1993)

- רודי רוכמן
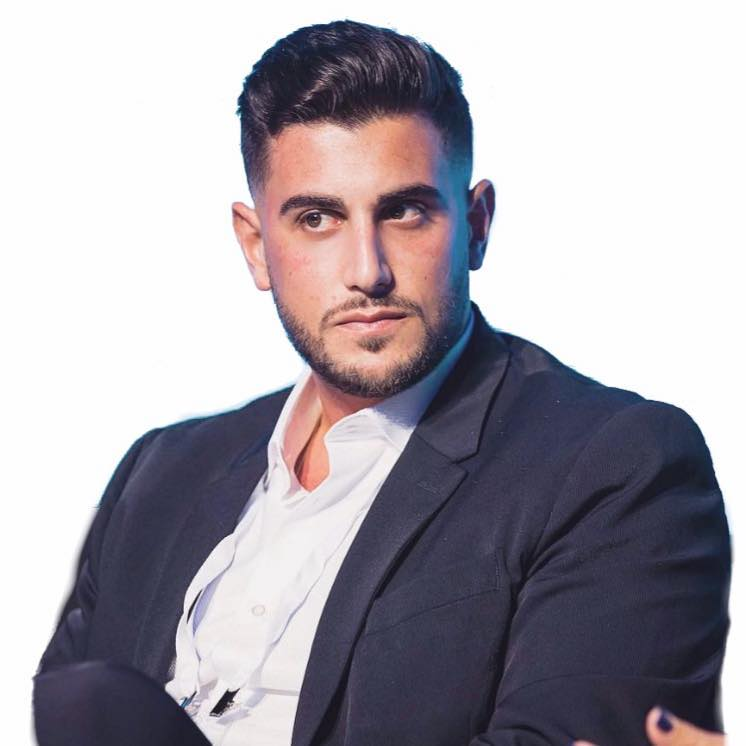
- Born: 6 September 1993 (age 33); Paris, France
- Education: Columbia University
- Known for: Jewish activism
- Movement: VISION movement
- Military career
- Allegiance: Israel
- Service years: 2011–2013, 2023-present
- Units: 98th Paratroopers Division; 35th Paratroopers Brigade; 55th Paratroopers Brigade
- Conflicts: Gaza–Israel conflict; 2012 Israeli operation in the Gaza Strip; Gaza war; Hezbollah–Israel conflict; 2024 Israeli invasion of Lebanon

Rudy Israel Rochman (Hebrew: רודי ישראל רוכמן; born 6 September 1993) is a Jewish-Israeli rights activist.

== Early life ==
Rochman was born in Paris, France, but moved to Israel when he was three years old. Two years later, his family moved to the United States. In 2000, at the age of seven, Rochman experienced antisemitism after being physically removed from a bus in London, England, for being Jewish; he has described this experience as the origin for his will to defend Jews worldwide.

Rochman served in the Paratroopers Brigade of the Israel Defense Forces from 2011 to 2013. Following his discharge, he attended the University of California, Los Angeles, but later transferred to Columbia University after seeing that it was named the most antisemitic university in North America, hoping to help defend the Jewish people there. He graduated from Columbia University in 2018.

== Activism ==
Rochman is a noted speaker and writer on Jewish rights. He frequently speaks at college campuses and to organizations that are pro-Israel. He is also known for his work as a Jewish and Israel rights activist on social media, where he has hundreds of thousands of followers.

During his studies at Columbia University in New York City, Rochman founded the school's chapter for Students Supporting Israel and served as its president. In 2020, Rochman ran in the World Zionist Congress elections as part of the Vision slate. As of 2020, he serves on the board of The Israel Innovation Fund, a philanthropic organization, and as part of the leadership team of HaBayit, a platform that aims to bring unity through dialogue between Israelis and Palestinians.

Rochman has been working on a documentary series called We Were Never Lost, which interviews "lesser-known Jewish communities".

=== Arrest in Nigeria ===
In July 2021, Rochman and two other Israeli filmmakers were arrested in Nigeria while filming the We Were Never Lost documentary. Although not having political motives for their visit, they were suspected to be politically involved with the conflict between Biafran separatists and the Nigerian government after meeting with the Igbo Jewish community. They were released after being imprisoned for 20 days in reportedly "horrendous conditions" and were "officially cleared of all wrongdoing".

=== Military ===
Rochman returned to active duty as a paratrooper in the Israel Defense Forces during the 2023 Gaza war. As a sniper in the paratrooper reserves, his unit was the first to enter southern Gaza, where it was deployed to the region of Khan Younis. He gave several interviews from the battlefield to news outlets such as MSNBC, Fox News and CBS, including a description of what he witnessed in the aftermath of the Hamas massacre of Kfar Aza.

== Views ==
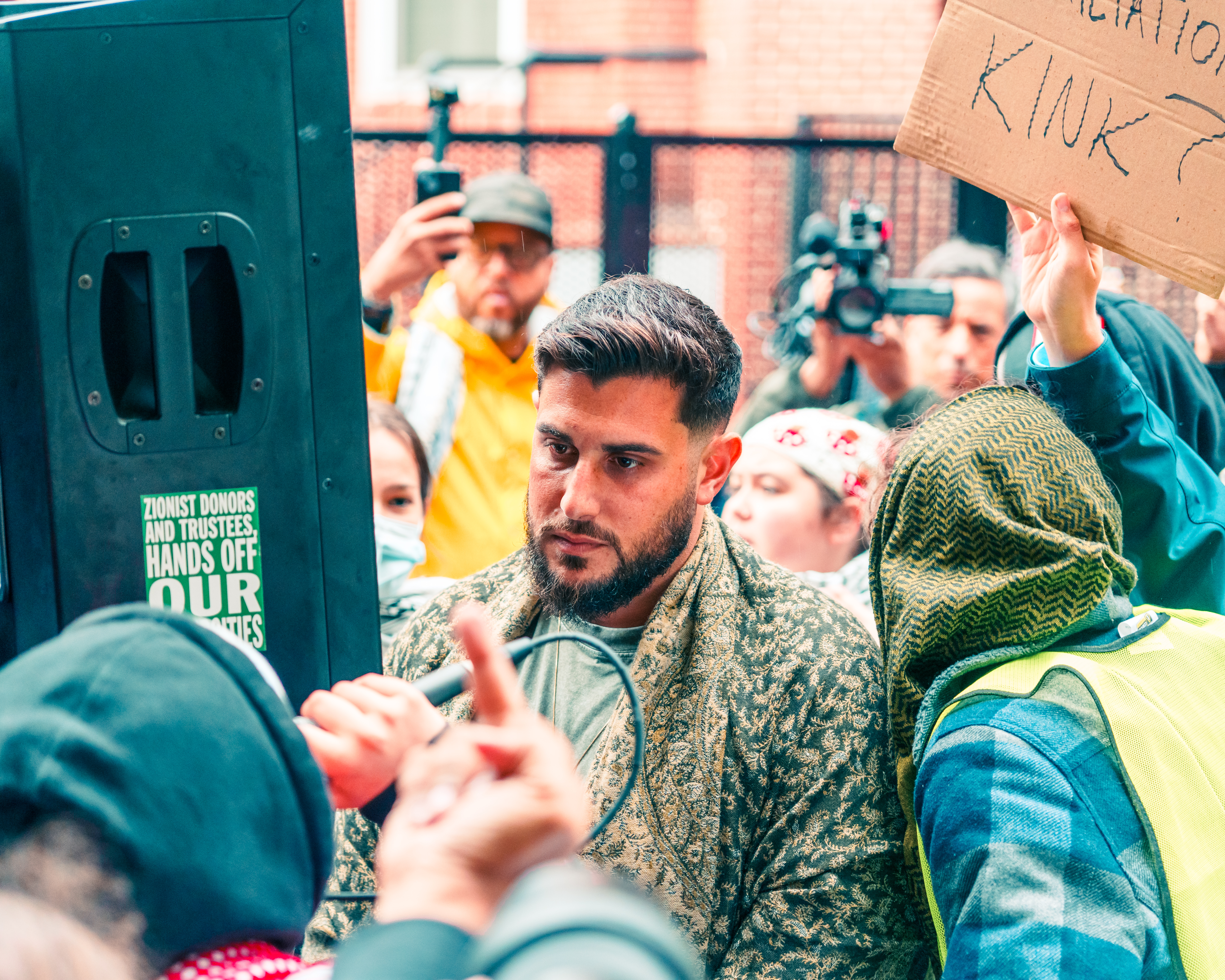
Rochman at George Washington University during the 2024 pro-Palestinian protests on university campuses

Rochman is a Zionist. His argument for the State of Israel's right to exist is based on the claim that Jews are indigenous to the land, and that they have always yearned to return there since their expulsion by the Roman Empire. He views Zionism as a movement of decolonization and believes that self-determination must involve being able to control, protect and self-identify with the Land of Israel.

Rochman has claimed that, although "Jewish people's connection to a higher power and Torah is an essential part of their identity", Judaism is not a religion. Rather, he refers to it as "a portable suitcase" that carries different elements of the Jewish identity, such as their culture, traditions, way of life and "a connection to a higher power". He claims that religion is considered a belief system in a deity or god that can spread across borders and nations, whereas if a Jew rejects the notion of God and the Torah or considers themselves to be atheist or agnostic, they would still be part of the Jewish people.

Rochman opposes the two-state solution as the solution for the Israeli–Palestinian conflict. In his opinion, it does not fulfill the aspirations of both Jews and Palestinians. Rochman believes that neither of the populations can be "liberated...without liberation of the other" and both groups should build "a just civilization as one that works for all".

Rochman is also against the United States providing aid to Israel. He views it as making Israel dependent on U.S. military supply, and thus preventing Israel from being militarily self-sufficient.

Rochman has claimed that intersectionality has been misused as a tactic by movements critical of Israel such as SJP to "pursue its agenda of demonizing Israel" and to "build alliances" with minority groups such as the LGBT community by equating their injustices to the Israeli–Palestinian conflict. He is also a critic of the Boycott, Divestment and Sanctions movement. He believes that the movement's agenda is rooted in antisemitism, and that it has contributed to the rise in antisemitic incidents on college campuses.

In December 2022, Rochman on a video posted to Instagram stated that "the majority of the Jewish people just walked into the gas chambers" during the Holocaust. These comments drew criticism as victim-blaming by some in the Jewish community. Later that month, Rochman faced further criticism for defending basketball player Kyrie Irving, who posted a link on Twitter to the documentary Hebrews to Negroes: Wake Up Black America, which contains antisemitic tropes and Holocaust denial. Rochman defended Irving saying: "there is some truth" to the documentary and that the Black Hebrew Israelites "are waking up to their identity. When they are coming to other Jews and say, 'My brother. I finally found out who I am. Come, let's unite together,' and most Jews, who have never heard this idea because a lot of them were raised in Europe, and have a lot of European mentality. They tend to say, 'You're not Jewish. You're African. We've never heard of such a thing.'" The Black Hebrew Israelites are a designated hate group by the Anti-Defamation League and the Southern Poverty Law Center. Rochman's comments in defense of the Black Hebrew Israelites were condemned by many in the Jewish community including Tyler Samuels, an African-American Jew, who said: "When you say that some of their points are correct, you bring damage to Black Jews like me...Judaism has an established protocol on who is and isn’t Jewish. I am deeply disturbed that a Jewish advocate has allowed this."

== Personal life ==
Rochman is fluent in Hebrew, English, and French. In a 2017 interview, he stated that he is a dual citizen of Israel and France, and that he has an American green card.
