= Nimlot =

n mA r V13
Nimlot
nm3rṯ
in hieroglyphs
Era: 3rd Intermediate Period
(1069–664 BC)

Nimlot (also Namilt, Namlot, Namart, Nemareth, Nemarot, and sometimes Nimrod) was the name of many ancient Egyptians with Libyan ancestry. It is the name of:

- Nimlot A, Chief of the Ma, father of pharaoh Shoshenq I of the 22nd Dynasty
- Nimlot B, ruler of Herakleopolis, son of Shoshenq I
- Nimlot C, High Priest of Amun and ruler of Herakleopolis, son of Osorkon II
- Nimlot of Hermopolis or Nimlot D, ruler of Hermopolis during the 25th Dynasty
