= Yehuda HaKohen =

Israeli settler and community organizer

- יהודה הכהן
- Born: 1979 or 1980 (age 46–47); New York, United States
- Occupations: Rabbi; Community organizer
- Movement: Semitic Action; VISION movement
- Children: 8

Yehuda HaKohen (Hebrew: יהודה הכהן; born 1979 or 1980) is a rabbi and community organizer who advocates for further Israeli settlements in the West Bank. He maintains an active presence on YouTube.

According to Drop Site News, he is associated with Canary Mission, a website accused of doxing individuals purportedly holding anti-Israeli views. HaKohen denies connection with the website.

== Early life ==
Yehuda HaKohen (born Jason Weisbrod, according to the investigative journalism website Drop Site News) made aliyah from New York City. After the Second Intifada, he enlisted in the Israel Defense Forces' Netzah Yehuda Battalion.

== Activism and views ==
After years of helping to establish Israeli outposts in the West Bank, HaKohen emerged as a leader in the VISION Movement, Semitic Action, and is a head educator of the ATID student leadership program. As a proponent of the one-state solution, HaKohen advocates for the peaceful coexistence of Israelis and Palestinians. He is a proponent of further expansion of Israeli settlements in the West Bank. HaKohen has described himself as a "post-Zionist," seeing "the Semitic Jewish people as an inherent and organic part of the Middle East", and that "once [Jewish] Israelis and Palestinians are both free to fully explore the nature of their people-hoods, the two populations will be able to make room for one another". HaKohen believes that the Oslo Accords were unsuccessful in that they sowed suspicion on both sides of the conflict instead of fostering peace. He maintains that Israel should not be dependent upon—or be an outpost of—the United States, but rather needs to find its own place in the Middle East amongst its neighbours. He discusses his views of the Israeli–Palestinian conflict on YouTube.

According to a report published by the investigative journalism website Drop Site News in 2026, HaKohen worked for Canary Mission, a website accused of doxing individuals purportedly holding anti-Israeli views. HaKohen denied connection with the website.

== Personal life ==
HaKohen and his family settled in Beit El in the West Bank in 2009. He has eight children.
