= Fighters' List =

Fighters' List רשימת הלוחמים
- Leader: Natan Yellin-Mor; Israel Eldad
- Ideology: Revisionist Zionism; Ultranationalism; Sternism; Factions: Socialism
- Most MKs: 1 (1949–1951)
- Fewest MKs: 1 (1949–1951)

Election symbol
- טו

The Fighters' List (Hebrew: רשימת הלוחמים, Reshimat HaLohmim) was a political party in Israel.

== History ==
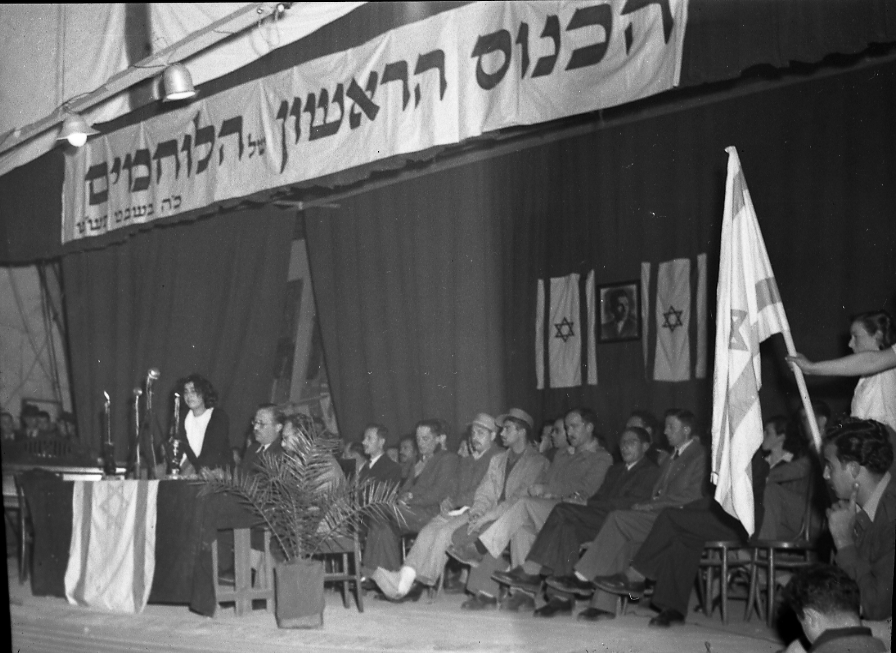
First meeting of the Fighters' List, Tel Aviv, February 1949

The Fighters' List grew out of Lehi, a militant Revisionist paramilitary organisation that operated in Palestine during the Mandate era, and in Israel until shortly after independence. Lehi was a controversial group, described by the British, the majority of the Yishuv, and the UN as a terrorist organisation. It had been involved in a series of notorious actions, including the assassination of Lord Moyne and the Deir Yassin massacre. The group was disbanded and integrated into the IDF in May 1948. However, they continued to act in Jerusalem until being forcefully broken up after the assassination of Count Folke Bernadotte, a UN mediator, on 17 September 1948.

After the final dissolution of Lehi, left-wing former members founded the Fighters' List to represent their cause in the 1949 elections. The list was headed by Natan Yellin-Mor, the former leader of Lehi, who at the time was in jail serving an eight-year sentence for leadership of Lehi, which had been outlawed and declared a terrorist organization. The party's election platform demanded the continuation of the war against Transjordan and Iraq to establish Jewish sovereignty on both sides of the Jordan River. The party won only 5,363 votes (1.22% of the total) and one seat in the first Knesset, and Yellin-Mor was released from prison as part of a general amnesty to take up his seat.

During the period of Yellin-Mor's term in the Knesset, the Fighters' List suffered severe internal divisions. Yellin-Mor pressed strongly for a pro-Soviet orientation and called for the establishment of a socialist regime and classless society. The vehement opposition of the former Lehi leader Yisrael Eldad, who accused Yellin-Mor of betraying the memory of Lehi's founder Yair Stern, led to his expulsion from the party. Only the Fighters' List supported Herut's motion of no confidence concerning the armistice agreements, and it was soundly defeated. The party did not compete in the 1951 elections.
