= Yitzhak Danziger =

Israeli sculptor (1916–1977)

Yitzhak Danziger יצחק דנציגר
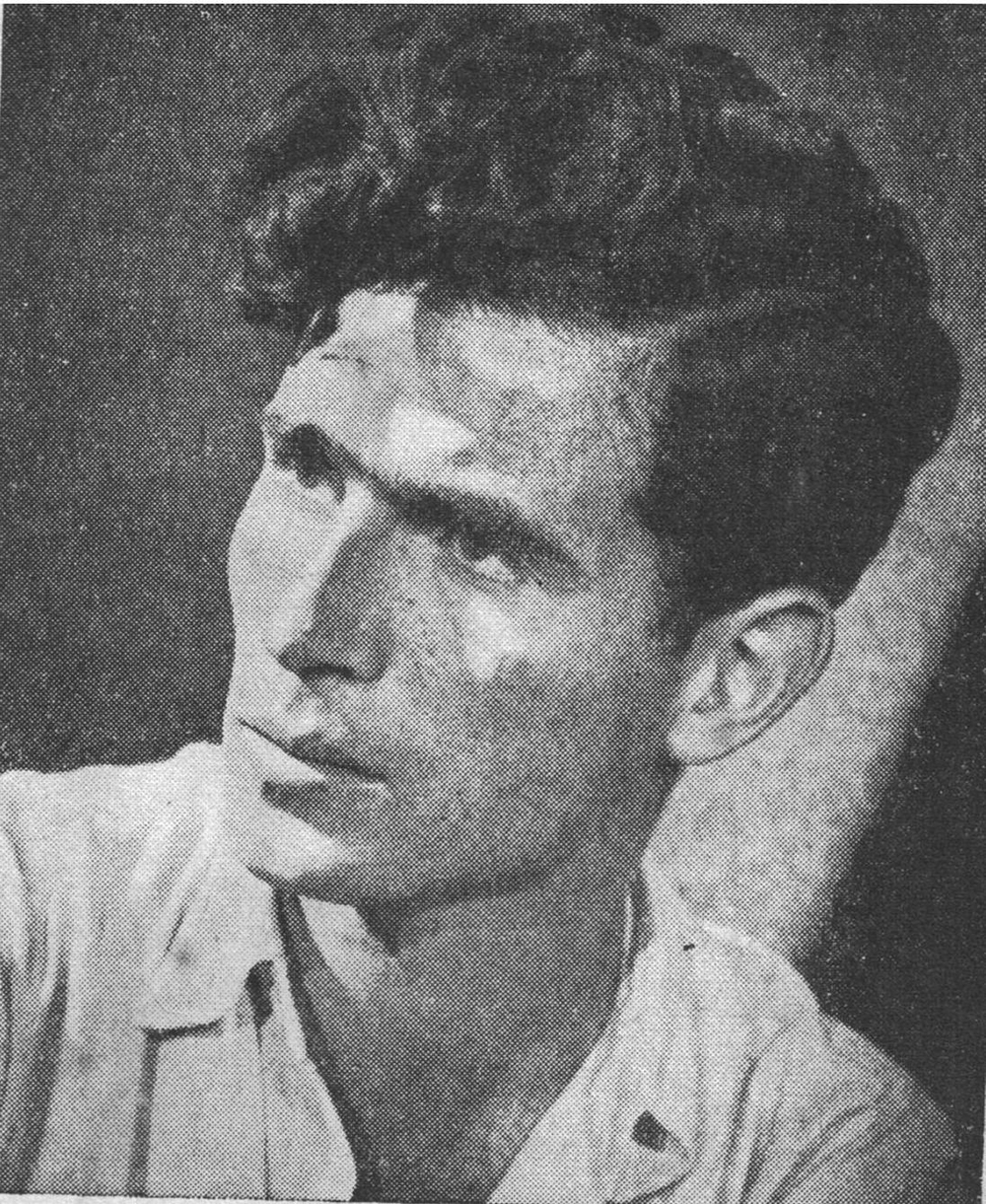
- Yitzhak Danziger, 1940's
- Born: 26 June 1916; Berlin, Germany
- Died: 11 July 1977 (aged 61) near Ramla, Israel
- Education: Slade School of Fine Arts University of London
- Known for: Painting and Sculpture
- Movement: Canaanite Movement

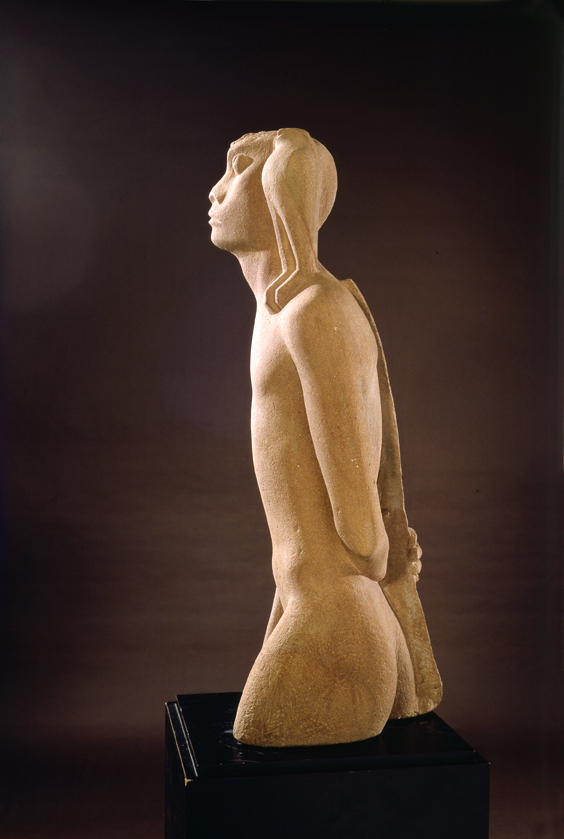
Nimrod (1939), Israel Museum collection.

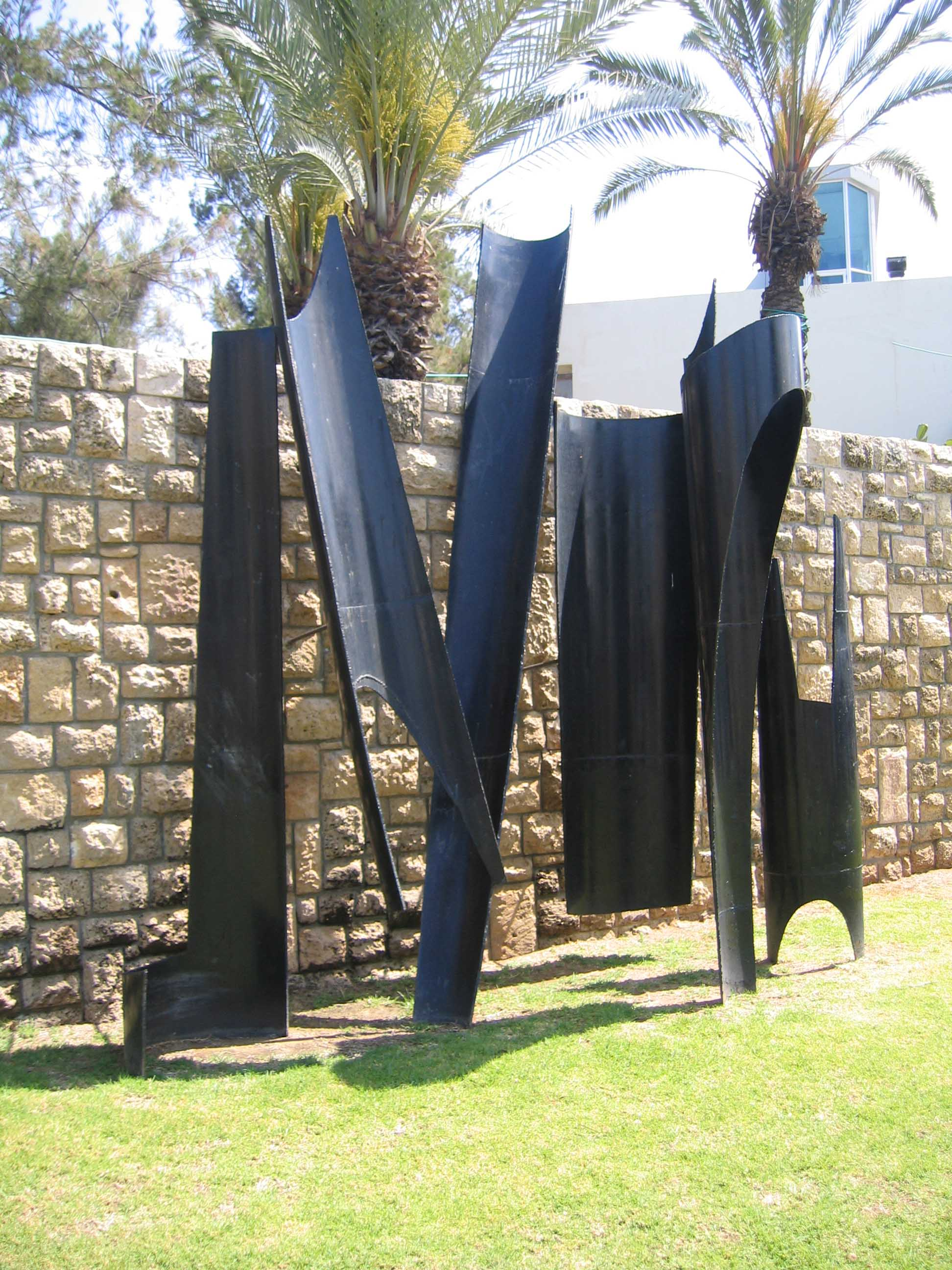
For the Fallen (1962), Beit Yad Lebanim, Holon

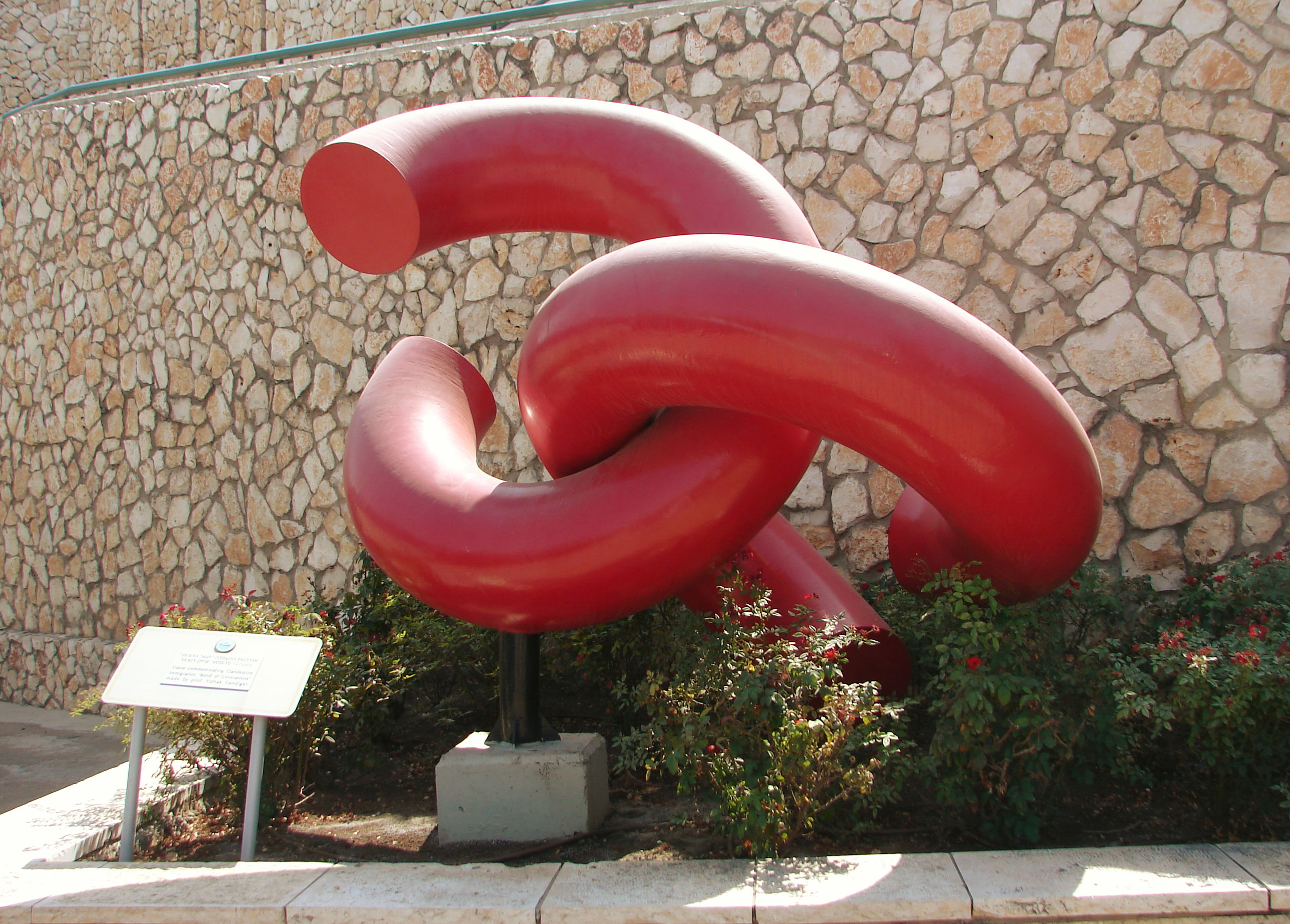
"Kesher Hadorot" (Connection between Generations), a monument to Clandestine Immigration at the entrance to the Clandestine Immigration and Naval Museum, Haifa, Israel

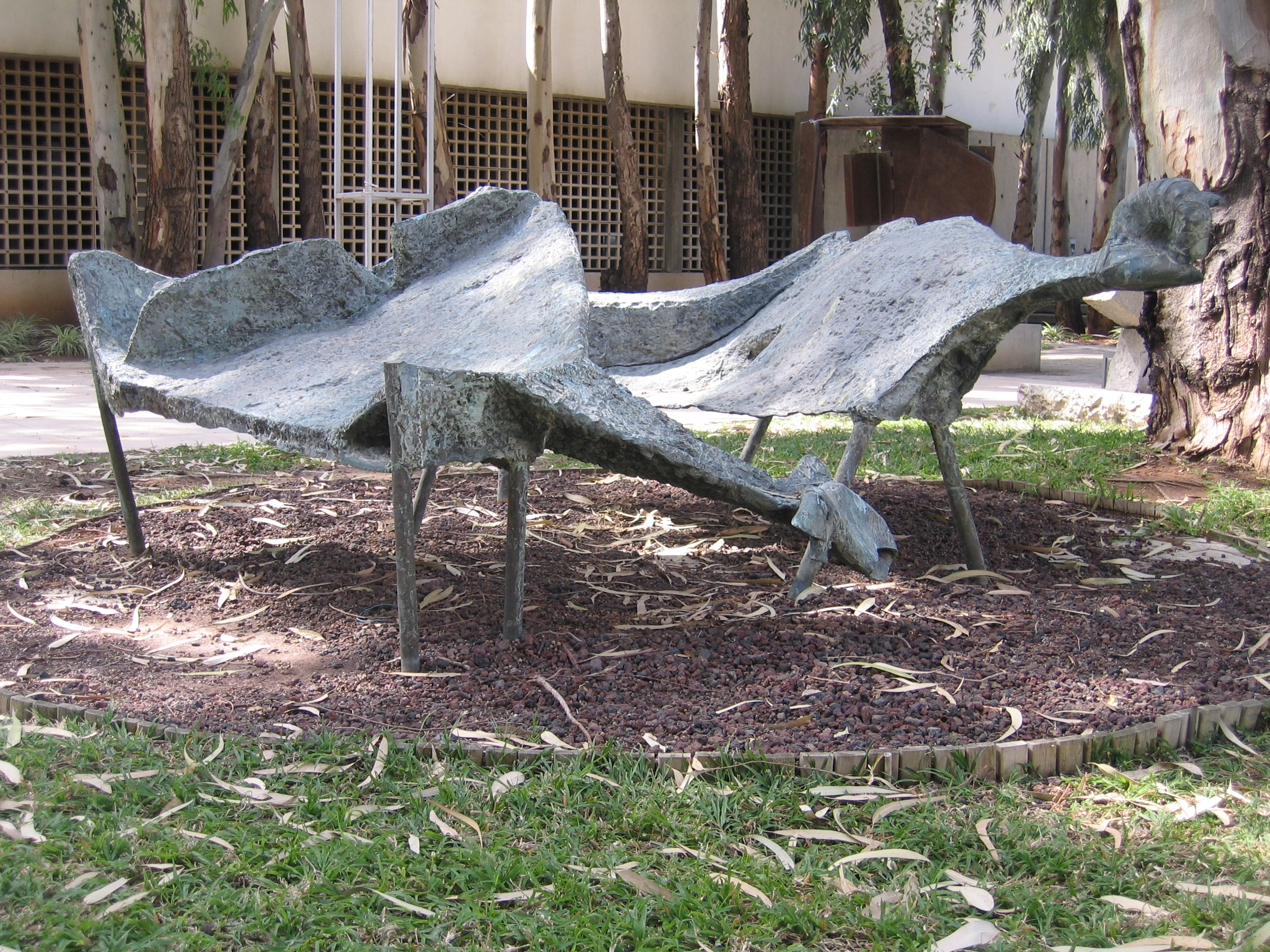
Sheep of the Negev (1963), Tel Aviv Museum of Art.

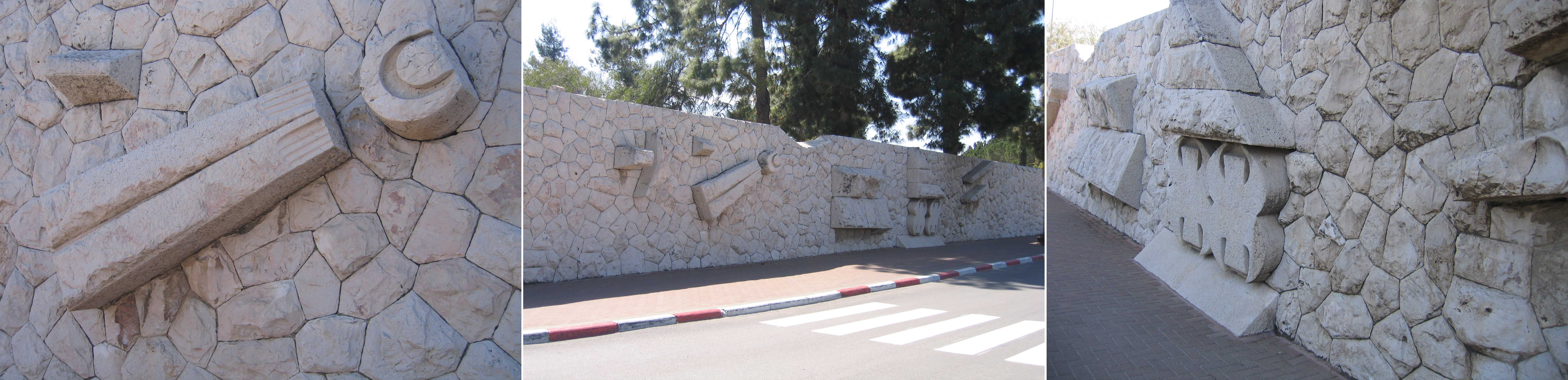
Relief (1958), Givat Ram, Jerusalem.

Yitzhak Danziger (Hebrew: יצחק דנציגר; 26 June 1916 – 11 July 1977) was an Israeli sculptor. He was one of the pioneer sculptors of the Canaanite Movement, and later joined the "Ofakim Hadashim" (New Horizons) group.

== Early life ==
Danziger was born in Berlin in 1916. His father was a surgeon and served in the German Army during World War I.

The family settled in Jerusalem. Danziger studied art at the Slade School of Fine Art 1934–37. He met Marion Edie at the Slade and they later married and had a son, Jeremy. Marion's mother was Muslim and Marion's union with Danziger was happy. They remained friends after their separation.

Danziger's work was influenced by his visits to the British Museum, the Anthropological Museum and the art from Ancient Egypt, Assyria, Babylon, Persia, India and Oceania and Africa. These would later on play an important role in his sculptures.

== Style and Technique ==
His work centres on the need to redefine the essence of sculpture. In the course of forty years, Danziger's work focused on two principal factors: space and time. At the outset of his artistic path he created sculptures which inhibit space as static objects capable of being immediately perceived, and over the years the objects progressively diminished and the sculptural experience became an extended process of transitions in space and time, occurring in the landscape and blending into an organic succession of encounters between man and his environment.

Danziger believed that the only option for the artist was to adhere to nature, to return to the landscape.

He said in an interview: “Abstract sculpture at its best gives us no associations of reality, although it is rooted in reality. We are surrounded by nature and influenced by it: geological forces, changes in the environment over time, they all have their impact upon us. When we encounter a rectangular object, a table, a car, a cave, we react in various ways. We are sensitive to angles, to a narrow street we pass, to a riverbed, a steep slope, a sheer precipice, a falling shadow – all of these influence our feelings.”

He was fascinated by the relationship between man and animal, and between a world of order and disorder. His artistic development was nourished by his longing to reach a oneness with that continuity which derives its vitality beyond immediate existence.

To Danziger's way of thinking, the artist is an intermediary whose primary interest is to ensure the continued existence of that fragile encounter between man and the place he belongs.

Danziger derived new methods using the interdisciplinary approach, combining the fields of ecology, geography, anthropology, and archaeology. Each of these fields contributes in its own way to the creation of the encounter with the "place" with all the varied contents of a man's natural environment which merge in a unique way, to create a complex network, a plurality of meanings, a completeness which is indivisible and integral.

== Career ==
He returned to Palestine and set up a studio at Tel Aviv in 1937.

Danziger created his statue "Nimrod" in 1938–1939. The statue is 90 centimetres high and made of Red Nubian Sandstone imported from Petra in Jordan. It depicts Nimrod as a naked hunter, uncircumcised, carrying a bow and with a hawk on his shoulder. The style shows the influence of Ancient Egyptian statues.

The unveiling of the statue caused a scandal. The Hebrew University of Jerusalem which had commissioned Danziger's statue was not happy with the result and religious circles made strong protests.

Within a few years, however, the statue was universally acclaimed as a major masterpiece of Israeli art, and has noticeably influenced and inspired the work of later sculptors, painters, writers and poets up to the present.

The Nimrod Statue was also taken up as the emblem of a cultural-political movement known as "The Canaanites", which advocated the shrugging off of the Jewish religious tradition, cutting off relations with Diaspora Jews and their culture, and adopting in its place a "Hebrew Identity" based on ancient Semitic heroic myths – such as Nimrod's. Though never gaining mass support, the movement had a considerable influence on Israeli intellectuals in the 1940s and early 1950s.

In 1946 Danziger went to Grande Chaumière in the south of France to work in the local sandstone, from which he sculpted large-scale figures and heads. During the summer of 1948, he stayed in Perpignan in the South of France. In September, he settled in London and reconnected with his classmates from the Slade, including Eduardo Paolozzi and Kenneth Armitage. In 1950 he had a solo exhibition at the Brook Street Gallery. Danziger was involved with two schools: the Cass Institute near Whitechapel and he participated in two courses in the design of gardens and landscape at the School of Architecture Association. While entering art competitions, he supported himself financially restoring the facades of buildings such as the Neo-Gothic stone carvings on the Houses of Parliament in London.

In 1955 he returned to Israel and he was commissioned to design a sculpture for the Kaplan building of the Hebrew University. In the same year, Danziger began teaching three-dimensional design in the Architecture Department at the Technion Institute in Haifa, a position he held for the rest of his life. He also had teaching roles at the Bezalel Academy in Jerusalem. He also enjoyed running workshops at the artists’ village at Ein Hod, which was an integral part of his vision as an artist.

Danziger and seventeen sculptors from different countries were invited to participate in the cultural events of the 1968 Olympic Games in Mexico City. He created 'Gate of Peace', a giant sculpture that reaches some 7.5m in height.

== Artistic Legacy ==
He is considered to be one of Israel's most important sculptors. He was a mentor and a model of artistic practice.

His work continues to be very popular. He is best known for his sculptures of figures, including "Head of a Man". His sculptures of goats "Ein Gedi" and sheep "Sheep of the Negev" are known for reflecting his artistic vision. He explained: "A flock of sheep resembles a carpet, something which glides down the hill and covers the ground, the slope of the valley...Sheep are symbols, models. Through the sheep I reach what interests me, the soil, light and shade."

His son, Jeremy Danziger, was an artist, sculptor and university lecturer.

== Awards ==
- 1945, the Dizengoff Prize for Sculpture.
- 1958 Milo Club Award, Kiryat Ono Monument Prize, Tel Aviv
- 1968, the Israel Prize, in sculpture.
- 1969, Sandberg Prize, in sculpture, Israel Museum of Jerusalem

== See also ==
- List of Israel Prize recipients
