= Pan-Semitism =

Ideology espousing the unification of Semitic-speaking peoples

Pan-Semitism is a pan-nationalist ideology that espouses the unification of Semitic-speaking peoples, which mostly included Arabs and Jews, but also Syriac Christians (Assyrians, Chaldeans, Arameans, Syriacs), Samaritans, Maltese and Mandaeans.

== History ==
Pan-Semitism was formed as an idealistic movement which advocated for a union between Arabs and Jews, with Semitic identity being the unifying factor. During the 1920s, Pan-Semitic ideologues further developed Pan-Semitism as a solution for the Arab-Jewish tensions in Mandatory Palestine. They also cited historic events, such as the Golden age of Jewish culture in Spain being under Al-Andalus. Different variations of Pan-Semitism also emerged. Pan-Semitism was unpopular among both Arabs and Jews and eventually declined. Some continued to espouse Pan-Semitism even after its decline.

Pan-Semitism also saw Islam and Judaism as closely related religions which could coexist even without secularism, and hailed Moses, Jesus, and Muhammad as examples of Semitic religious glory.

The united Semitic state proposed by Uri Avnery included Arab, Jewish, Samaritan, Assyrian, and Mandaean regions throughout the Middle East.

The Brit Shalom organisation espoused Pan-Semitism. Brit Shalom had Anti-Western views and saw Pan-Semitism as a way for Jews and Arabs to reintegrate in the land which was historically significant for both communities. Many Jews who advocated for Pan-Semitism also sought to reverse the Westernisation of Jews and reintegrate to their historic Semitic lifestyle which was Oriental.

Despite the conflict between Arabists and some Zionists, the relations between Arabs and Jews living in rural lands were cordial. Community leaders from both sides were close together. Many Arabs and Jews were even motivated by their personal friendships to embrace Pan-Semitism. A 1930 commission report stated that Arab-Jewish coexistence was very common in rural villages.

Pan-Semitism was not the same as bi-nationalism. Bi-nationalism was broader and advocated for an Arab-Jewish one-state solution. While Pan-Semitism also advocated for a one-state solution, it advocated for a Semitic state rather than an Arab or Jewish state. Not all bi-nationalists were Pan-Semitists. Bi-nationalism was not motivated by Pan-Semitism.

== See also ==
- Canaanism
- Semitic Action
- Syrian Socialist Nationalist Party
