= Canaanism =

Jewish cultural movement (1939–1987)

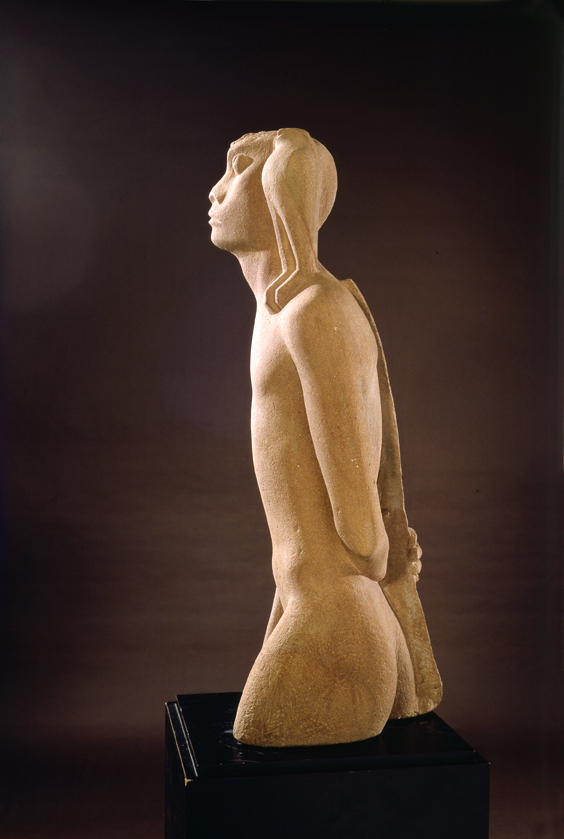
Nimrod (1939) by Yitzhak Danziger, a visual emblem of the Canaanite idea.

Canaanism was a cultural and ideological movement founded in 1939, reaching its peak among the Jews of Mandatory Palestine during the 1940s. It has had a significant effect on the course of Israeli art, literature and spiritual and political thought. Its adherents were called Canaanites (Hebrew: כנענים). The movement's original name was the Council for the Coalition of Hebrew Youth (הוועד לגיבוש הנוער העברי) or less formally, the Young Hebrews; Canaanism was originally a pejorative term. It came out of Revisionist Zionism and had roots in European extreme right-wing movements, particularly Italian fascism. Most of its members were former members of the Irgun or Lehi.

Canaanism never had more than around two dozen registered members, but because most of them were influential intellectuals and artists, the movement had an influence which went far beyond its size. Its members believed that much of the Middle East had been a Hebrew-speaking civilization in antiquity. Ron Kuzar says they hoped to revive this civilization, creating a "Hebrew" nation disconnected from the Jewish past, which would embrace the Middle East's Arab population as well. They saw both "world Jewry and world Islam" as backward and medieval; Kuzar also says that the movement "exhibited an interesting blend of militarism and power politics toward the Arabs as an organized community on the one hand and a welcoming acceptance of them as individuals to be redeemed from medieval darkness on the other."

In more recent years, the VISION Movement has generally been seen as the representative of Canaanism in the 21st century. It mostly focuses on building a peace process through creating a bi-national state through creating a dialogue between the Hilltop Youth and Palestinians. They refer to their ideology as Jewish liberation.

== The Canaanites and Judaism ==
The movement was founded in 1939. In 1943, the Jewish-Palestinian poet Yonatan Ratosh published an Epistle to the Hebrew Youth, the first manifesto of the Canaanites. In this tract, Ratosh called upon Hebrew youth to disaffiliate themselves from Judaism, and declared that no meaningful bond united Hebrew youth residing in Palestine and Judaism. Ratosh argued that Judaism was not a nation but a religion, and as such it was universal, without territorial claims; one could be Jewish anywhere. For a nation to genuinely arise in Palestine, he maintained, the youth must uncouple from Judaism and form a Hebrew nation with its own unique identity. (The term "Hebrew" had been associated with the Zionist aspiration to create a strong, self-confident "new Jew" since the late nineteenth century). The birthplace and geographical coordinates of this nation is the Fertile Crescent.

The Council for the Coalition of Hebrew Youth calls upon you as a Hebrew, as one for whom the Hebrew homeland is a homeland in actuality: not as vision, nor as desire; and not as solution for the Jewish question, nor as solution to cosmic questions, and not as solution to the variegated neuroses of those stricken by the diaspora. As one for whom the Hebrew language is a language in actuality and practicality, a mother tongue, a language of culture and of the soul; the one and only language for emotion and thought. As one whose character and intellect were determined in the Hebrew reality, whose internal landscape is the landscape of the nation and whose past is the past of the nation alone. As one who, despite the best efforts of rootless parents, teachers, statesmen and religious leaders, could not be made to like and affiliate with the Shtetl and the history of the diaspora, the pogroms and expulsions and martyrs, and whose natural estrangement from all prophets of Zionism, the fathers of Jewish Literature in the Hebrew tongue, and the diaspora mentality and the diaspora problem, cannot be expunged. Whereas all these were conferred upon you by force, like a borrowed cloth, faded and tattered and too-tight.

As a result of their estrangement from Judaism, the Canaanites were also estranged from Zionism. The State of Israel ought to be, they argued, a Hebrew state, not a solution to the Jewish Question. Following the first Aliyah, a generation that spoke Hebrew as a native language arose in Palestine and it did not always identify with Judaism. The Canaanites argued that designating the Israeli People as a "Jewish People" was misleading. If it was possible to be a Jew anywhere, then, the existence of the State of Israel was merely an anecdote in the history of Judaism. A nation must be rooted in a territory and a language—things which Judaism, in its very nature, could not provide.

== Flag of the Hebrew Youth ==
The flag of the Hebrew Youth

In 1944, Yonatan Ratosh, one of the movement's leaders in the 1940s and 1950s, published "The Opening Message: At the Committee Session with the Messengers of the Cells", a fifty-page pamphlet containing the founding speech of the Hebrew Youth's movement. On the cover of the publication is pasted the image of the proposed flag for the Hebrew people. The golden symbol on the flag is based on the first Hebrew letter, aleph, in the Paleo-Hebrew script (𐤀), which symbolizes the horns of the bull. The golden symbol also symbolizes the rays of the sun at sunrise over the mountains in the east (in blue), which paint the sky red. This symbol was later used by the movement, and following it the movement's newspaper was also called "Alef". Ratosh attached great importance to this flag, which he called "the flag of Tekhelet (light blue), the Argaman (purple), and the golden rays", and in his speech he noted: "This flag is what will remain of our book with all our hearts, it is the essence of the essence of our first book, and whoever remembers this flag alone, also in it the writer did his mission. His day will also come, and he will follow this flag, in its shadow he will live and on it he will die."

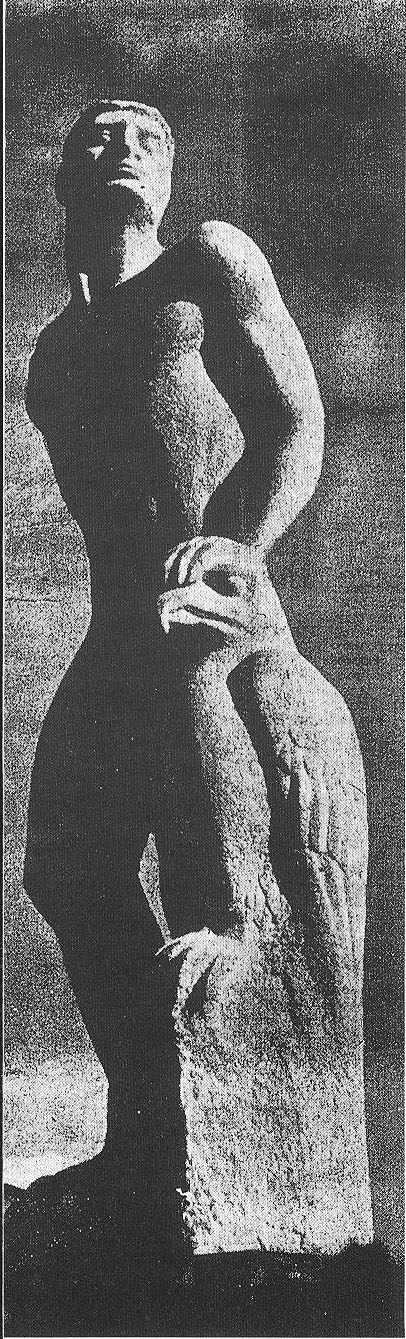
"Man in Arava" (1952), by Yechiel Shemi

== Canaanites and history ==
The movement promoted the idea that the Land of Israel was that of ancient Canaan (or, according to others, the whole of the Fertile Crescent) in which ancient peoples and cultures had lived, and that the historical occasion of the reemergence of an Israeli people constituted a veritable revival of these selfsame ancient Hebrews and their civilization, and consequently a rejection of religious Judaism in favor of a native and rooted Hebrew identity.

Because the Canaanites sought to create in Israel a new people, they mandated the dissociation of Israelis from Judaism and the history of Judaism. In their stead they placed the culture and history of the Ancient Near East, which they considered the true historical reference. They argued that the people of the Land of Israel in the days of the biblical monarchs had not been Jewish but Hebrew, and had shared a cultural context with other peoples of the region. Citing contemporary biblical criticism, the Canaanites argued that the Tanakh reflected this ancient history, but only partly, since it had been compiled in the period of the Second Temple by Jewish scribes who had rewritten the history of the region to suit their world-view.

Much of the Canaanite effort was dedicated to researching the history of the Middle East and its peoples. The Canaanites cited approvingly the work of Umberto Cassuto, who translated Ugaritic poetry into Hebrew. (Ugarit was an ancient city located in modern-day northern Syria, where in the early 20th century many important ancient texts, written in the Ugaritic language, were discovered.) Ugaritic verse bore an uncanny resemblance to the language of the Tanakh. The Canaanites argued that these texts proved that the people of the Land of Israel had been much closer socially and culturally to other peoples of the region than they had been to Judaism.

== Canaanites and literature ==
In his book, Sifrut Yehudit ba-lashon ha-ʻIvrit (Jewish Literature in the Hebrew Tongue), Yonatan Ratosh sought to differentiate between Hebrew literature and Jewish literature written in the Hebrew language. Jewish literature, Ratosh claimed, could be and was written in any number of languages. The ideas and writing style that characterize Jewish literature in Hebrew were not substantially different from those of Jewish literature in other languages. Ratosh and his fellow Canaanites (especially Aharon Amir) thought that Hebrew literature should be rooted to its historical origins in the Land of Israel and the Hebrew language. As an example they noted American literature, which in their mind was newly created for the new American people.

Canaanite verse is often obscure to those unfamiliar with ancient Ugaritic and Canaanite mythology. One of the principal techniques used by the Canaanites to produce Hebrew literature was to adopt words and phrases (especially hapax legomena, which the Canaanites regarded as traces of the original unedited Hebraic Tanakh) from the Tanakh, and use them in a poetic that approximated biblical and Ugaritic verse, especially in their use of repetitive structures and parallelism. The Canaanites did not rule out the use of new Hebrew words, but many of them did avoid Mishnaic Hebrew. However, these characteristics represent only the core of the Canaanite movement, and not its full breadth.

The late literary scholar Baruch Kurzweil argued that the Canaanites were not sui generis, but a direct continuation (albeit a radical one) of the literature of Micha Josef Berdyczewski and Shaul Tchernichovsky.

== Canaanites and language ==
Ratosh and his brother, Uzzi Ornan, also sought for the Romanization of Hebrew in order to further divorce the language from the older Hebrew alphabet. Writing articles in the Hebrew-language press in the 1960s and 1970s, they criticized the Hebrew alphabet for its graphical shortcomings and relationship with Judaism, and proposed for official Romanization of the language in order to further free secular Hebrew Israelis from the hold of religion and integrate them into the larger Levantine region. Their proposals for wholesale Romanization met condemnation from various public figures due to the perception that Romanization was a means of assimilation and Levantinization.

İlker Aytürk later compared the Canaanite proposal for Romanization to the more successful reform of the Turkish alphabet as undertaken by Mustafa Kemal Atatürk in Turkey; the reform of Turkish spelling, which had previously been written in the Arabic-based Ottoman Turkish alphabet for over 1,000 years until the dissolution of the Ottoman Empire, was similarly motivated by Atatürk's attempts to secularize and modernize post-Ottoman Turkish society.

== Activities ==
The Coalition published a journal, Aleph, which ran from 1948–1953, featuring the works of several luminaries of the movement including Ratosh, Adia Horon, Uzzi Ornan, Amos Kenan and Benjamin Tammuz. It was edited by Aharon Amir, and the journal circulated erratically throughout its existence. The journal was named after a Young Hebrews' flag designed by Ratosh, that featured an aleph in the more figurative shape of an ox's head, as in the Phoenician or Paleo-Hebrew alphabet.

The history of the Coalition and the movement was fraught with controversy and opposition. In 1951, leaflets were distributed by self-identified Canaanites in opposition to Zionism during the World Zionist Congress in Jerusalem that year. Later that year, the Coalition was formally organized at a conference of ideologues, but the permit to formally register as an NGO was deliberately delayed by the Interior Ministry; the ministry's representative explained that the approval has been delayed because "the group did not complete the standard inquiry of the granting of approvals for political societies". The group claimed as many as 500 members at its height, although outside commentators only assessed the membership at around 100.

After the arrest of Amos Kenan in June 1952 on suspicion of throwing a bomb onto the doorstep of David-Zvi Pinkas, newspaper editorials were lodged against the Canaanite movement and its members. The Coalition claimed to have no connection to Kenan or his act, and both Amir and Ratosh filed a libel suit against Isaiah Bernstein of HaTzofe and Ezriel Carlebach from Maariv on behalf of the Coalition, but the suit was rejected for technical reasons.

In the 1960s, the movement's members participated in group discussions called "Hebrew Thought Clubs" and issued a booklet of their discussions as "the first claw." Among participants in the discussions were also identified individuals who were Canaanites, as Rostam Bastuni, an Israeli Arab who was a member of the second Knesset for Mapam, and Yehoshua Palmon.

== Scope and influence ==
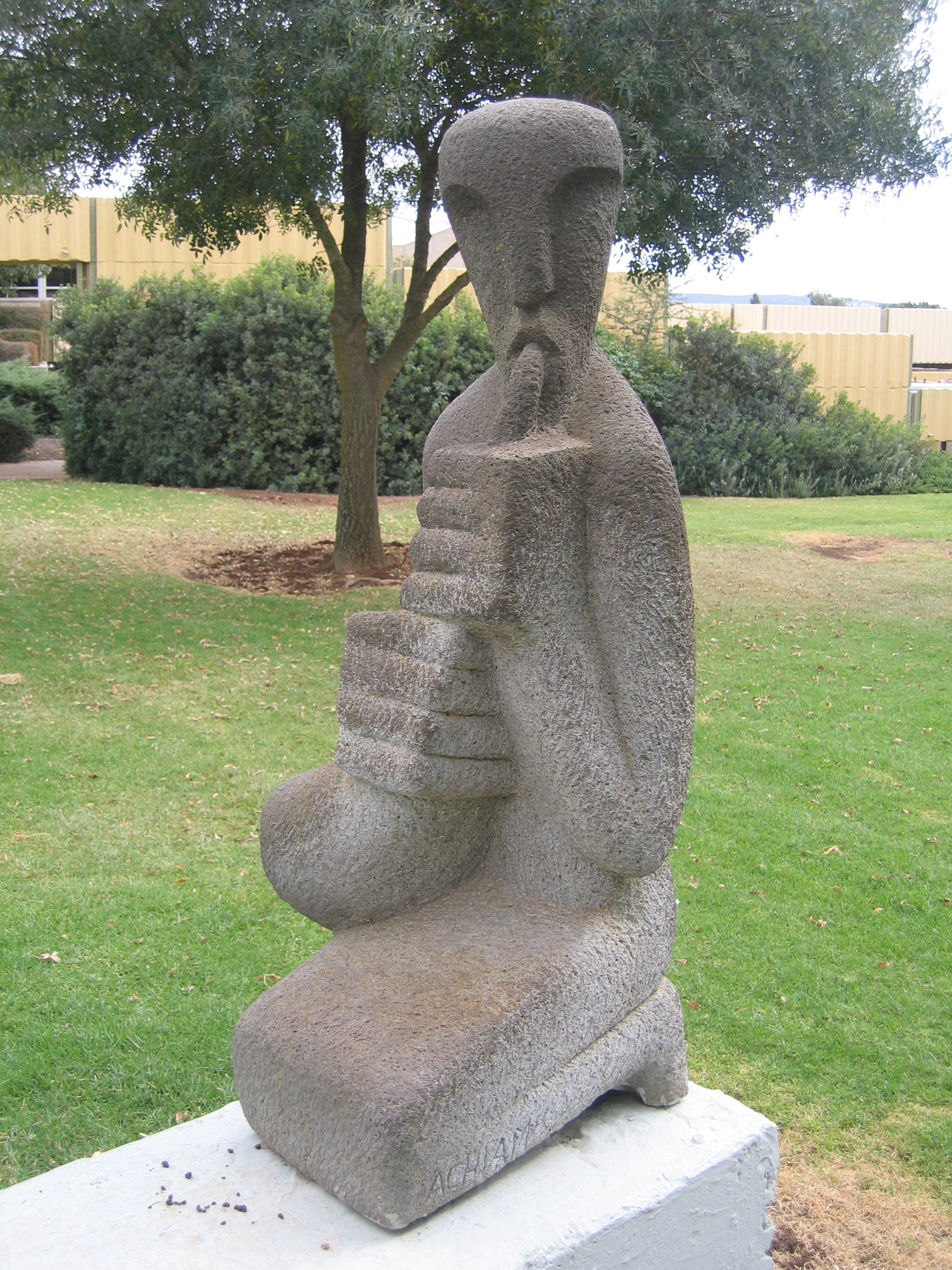
"Horn Player" (1964) by Achiam

The political influence of the Canaanites was limited, but their influence on literary and intellectual life in Israel was great. Among the avowed Canaanites were the poet Yonatan Ratosh and thinkers such as Edya Horon. A series of articles which Horon published in the journal "Keshet" in 1965 were compiled after his death into a book and published in 2000. These articles constituted political and cultural manifestos that sought to create a direct connection between Semitic culture from the second millennium BCE and contemporary Israeli culture, relying on advancements in the fields of archeology and research of Semitic languages in linguistics.

Some of the artists who took after the movement were the sculptors Yitzhak Danziger (whose Nimrod became a visual emblem of the Canaanite idea), Yechiel Shemi and Dov Feigin, novelist Benjamin Tammuz, writer Amos Kenan, novelist and translator Aharon Amir, thinker and linguist Uzzi Ornan and many others.

The journalist Uri Avnery praised Horon's journal Shem in 1942 but did not subscribe to Ratosh's orthodoxy; in 1947 he derided the Canaanites as romantic, anachronistic, and divorced from reality. However, the influence of Canaanism is still evident in some of his political thought, such as his 1947 proposal for a pan-Semitic union of Middle Eastern states. Avnery, along with several former Canaanites (notably Kenan and Boaz Evron) later changed positions drastically, becoming advocates for a Palestinian state. Israeli leftists and secularists are sometimes accused of Canaanism or Canaanite influence by their opponents.

The idea of creating a new people in Palestine different from the Jewish life in the diaspora which preceded it never materialized in purist Canaanite conception, but nevertheless had a lasting effect on the self-understanding of many spheres of Israeli public life.

== Criticism ==
The Canaanite movement, since soon after its inception, has met been with heavy and extensive criticism. In 1945 Nathan Alterman published the poem "Summer Quarrel" (later included in the collection City of the Dove, published in 1958), which took issue with the central tenets of the Canaanite movement. Alterman and others claimed that so many years in the diaspora cannot be simply expunged. Alterman argued that no one should coerce the Jewish settlement to adopt an identity; its identity will be determined through its experience in time.

Ratosh responded with an article in 1950 in which he claimed that Alterman was dodging important questions about Israeli identity. He argued that a return to ancient Hebrew traditions is not only feasible but necessary.

Alterman was not the only person to speak out against the Canaanites. Among the important critics of the movement was Baruch Kurzweil, who published The Roots and Quintessence of the 'Young Hebrews' Movement in 1953, which analyzed and sharply criticized Canaanite ideas. Kurzweil argued that the Canaanite ambition to motivate the variegated ethnography of the region in a single direction was not as easy as the Canaanites believed. Kurzweil believed the Canaanites replaced logos with mythos, producing a religious delusion:

Since it itself neglects the historical continuity of its people, introduces obscure concepts into their political vision in its declarations of a 'Hebrew Land on the Euphrates', and relies on increasingly irrational argumentation, the movement is liable to find itself an escape into the realm of myth.

The Young Hebrews are not the first to launch themselves into the task of mythic renewal. Their original contribution is rather stale. For over a hundred years, the world has pined for a return to the lap of myth. The escapes into various myths have hitherto inflicted disasters upon humanity. In the spirit of good faith, it is best to assume that the whole chapter of mythic renewal in European thought is unclear to them. For the moment, we shall content ourselves with this quotation from Huizinga: "Barbarization sets in when, in an old culture… the vapors of the magic and fantastic rise up again from the seething brew of passions to cloud the understanding: when the mythos supplants the logos."

In the same article Kurzweil argues that, if no viable alternative was found, the Canaanite movement might become the leading political ideology in Israel.

== Image gallery ==
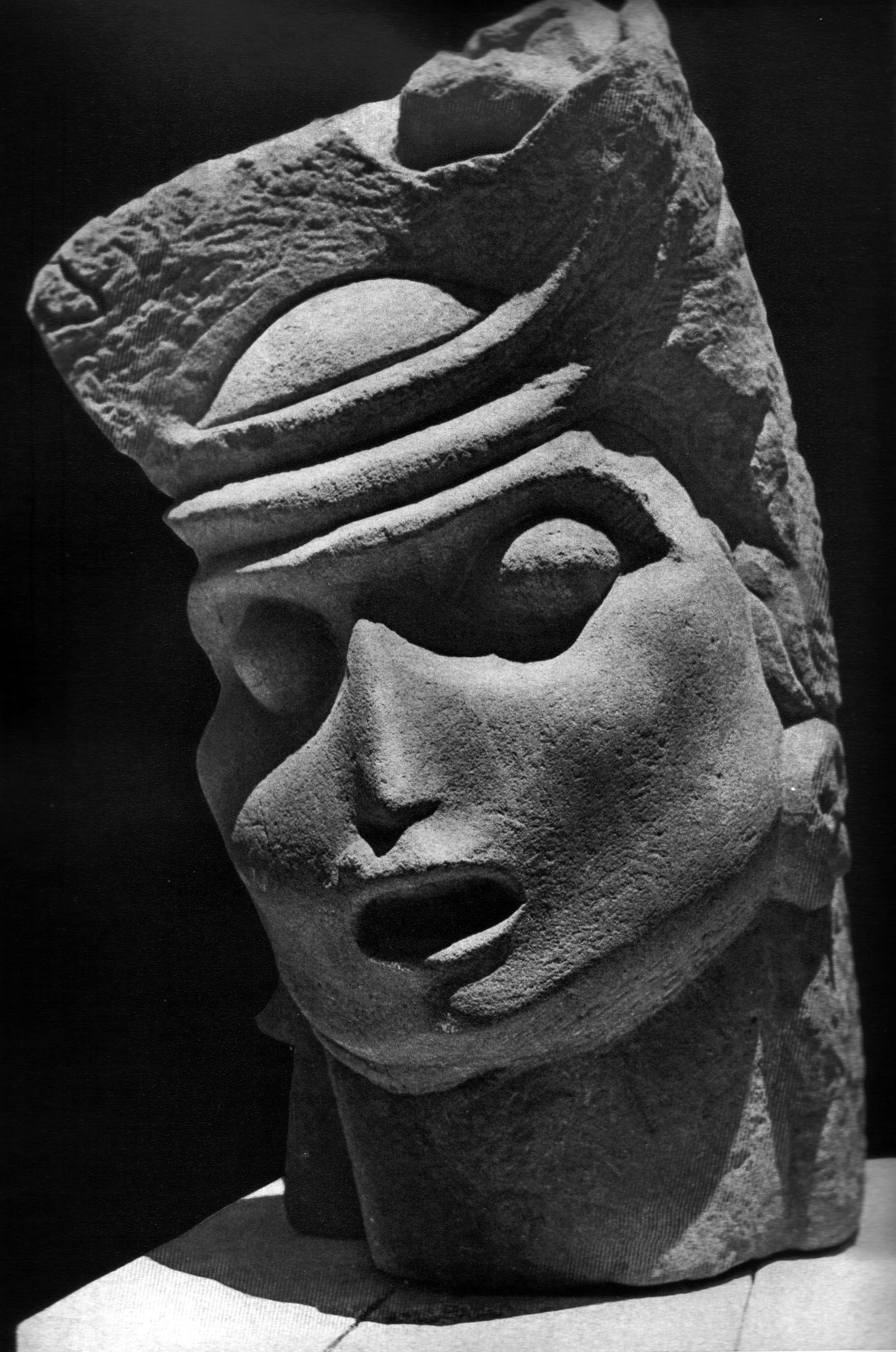
"Shebaziya" (1939) by Yitzhak Danziger

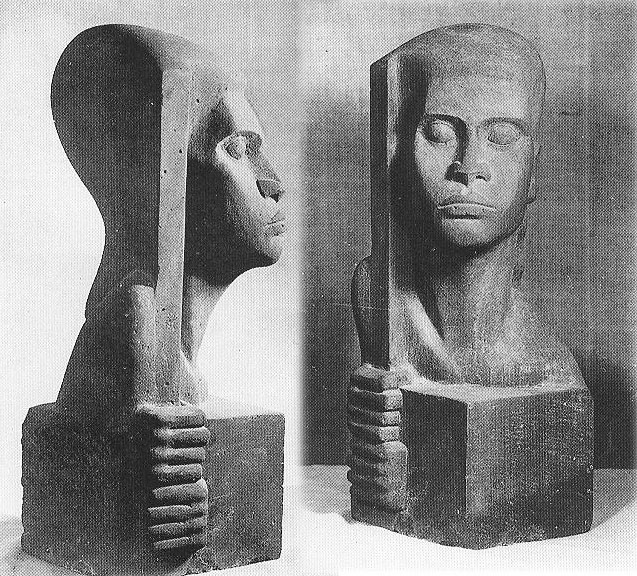
"Gahazi" (1940) by Yechiel Shemi

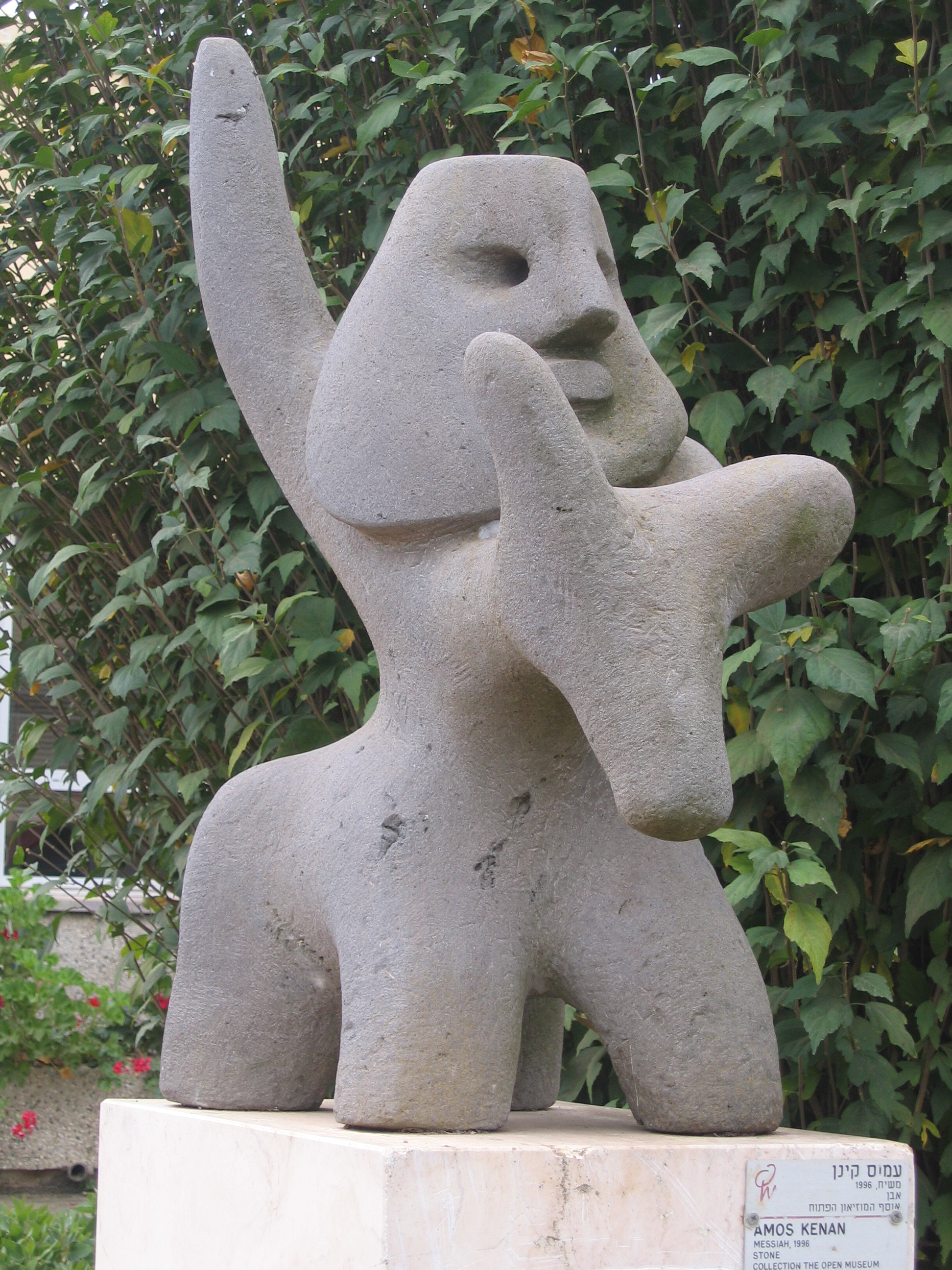
"Messiah" (1966) by Amos Kenan

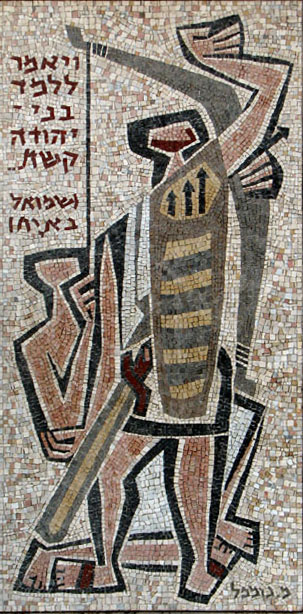
A biblical-themed mosaic (1966-67) at the entrance to the Yad Labanim memorial center in Petah Tikva by Mordechai Gumpel

== See also ==
- Negation of the Diaspora
- Zionism
- Ofakim Hadashim
- Phoenicianism
- Semitic Action
- Syrian Socialist Nationalist Party
- Origin of Palestinians
- Pan-Semitism
- Pharaonism
- Post-Zionism
- Hebrew Universalism (philosophy)
- Assyrian nationalism
- Arameanism
