= VISION movement =

VISION
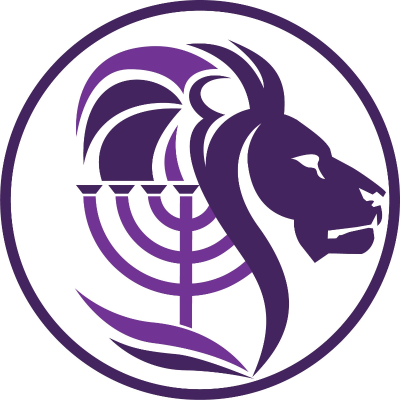
- Leader: Rabbi Yehuda HaKohen
- Ideology: Hebrew Universalism; Sternism; One-state solution Settler interests Palestinian interests Anti-Western influence

Website
- https://visionmovement.org

The VISION movement is a Hebrew Universalist movement and branch of Rav Oury Cherki's Noahide World Center. The movement supports the Jewish resettlement of Gaza, a one-state solution, working with Palestinians to simultaneously pursue both Jewish and Arab liberation, the Palestinian right of return, and opposes American influence in Israeli politics.

The movement runs several programs which seek to educate Jewish diaspora youth on the intricacies of the Arab-Israeli conflict by exposing them to a diverse array of individuals, both Jewish and Palestinian, who've personally taken part in hostilities or have been impacted by them.

== Ideological influences ==
=== Hebrew Universalism ===
Hebrew Universalism is a Jewish cultural, religious, and political philosophy which synthesizes aspects of Zionism, Haredi non-Zionism, and humanism. Members believe Zionism failed to fully fulfill Jewish liberation and recognize the early Zionists utilized European-style settler-colonial tactics to establish the State of Israel, leading to the Nakba.

=== Decolonization ===
A primary goal of the movement is to push towards the decolonization of the Jewish people and the entirety of the Middle East.

In its 2020 World Zionist Congress platform, the group stated:

The Jewish people constitutes a proud ancient civilization with a unique culture, worldview, traditions and homeland. But as a result of our displacement and many centuries of oppression, several aspects of our identity have been stolen from us or diluted to the point of becoming barely recognizable. Every people that experiences liberation must subsequently engage in a postcolonial conversation. VISION promotes conversations aimed at decolonizing Jewish identity as a necessary component of rebuilding Hebrew civilization in the modern age.

Canaanism, specifically the Canaanism espoused by the Semitic Action group, has heavily influenced the movement as well. Rav HaKohen reformed Semitic Action in 2011 and the group regularly contributes to VISION's online magazine.

=== Lehi thought ===
Lehi paramilitary members, such as Avraham Stern, Nathan Yellin-Mor, Yitzhak Shamir, and Israel Eldad have influenced the movement greatly.

The Lehi separated from the Zionist movement in 1944 and created a uniquely Hebrew form of National Bolshevism.

== Members and supporters ==
- Rav Oury Amos Cherki - Leader of the Noahide World Center and senior speaker at Machon Meir.
- Rav Yehuda HaKohen - Leader in the movement.
- Rudy Rochman - Israeli civil rights activist and social media influencer.
- Antwan Saca - Palestinian peace activist.

== See also ==
- Rav Avraham Kook
- Kahanism
- Gush Emunim
- Haredim and Zionism
- Haredi nationalism
- Hardal anti-Zionism
- Syncretic politics
- Lehi
