= Semitic Action =

1950s–1960s political party in Israel

Semitic Action הפעולה השמית
- Leader: Uri Avnery; Natan Yellin-Mor; Boaz Evron
- Founded: 1956 (original); 2011 (refounded)
- Preceded by: Lehi
- Ideology: Anti-colonialism; Canaanism; Pan-Semitism; Hebrew Universalism; Minority rights; Post-Zionism; Secularism
- Political position: Left-wing
- International affiliation: Unrepresented Nations and Peoples Organization

Website
- www.semiticaction.org.il/home/

Semitic Action (Hebrew: הפעולה השמית, HaPeulah Hashemit) was a small Israeli political group of the 1950s and 1960s which sought the creation of a regional federation encompassing Israel and its Arab neighbors.

The same name is used by a new group formed in 2011 with broadly similar goals.

== Original group ==
Created in 1956, the group's key members were Uri Avnery, Natan Yellin-Mor, and Boaz Evron, with other members including Maxim Ghilan, Shalom Cohen, and Amos Kenan. Joel Beinin describes the group as "a political expression of the Canaanite movement" which "advocated that Hebrew-speaking Israelis cut their ties with the Jewish diaspora and integrate into the Middle East as natives of the region on the basis of an anticolonialist alliance with its indigenous Arab inhabitants."

In 1958 the group published a platform, titled "The Hebrew Manifesto." It described the "Hebrew nation" in Israel as a new entity, albeit one linked to the Jewish diaspora, and called for moving beyond outmoded Zionist ideas that were now holding back the nation's development. It put forward a program of secularism, complete civic equality between Jews and Arabs, support for anti-colonial movements, and a relationship with the diaspora based on national interest rather than ethnic, religious, or cultural ties. Jacob Shavit writes that the manifesto emerged from the meeting of three groups: former Canaanites, former Lehi members who had moved to the Left, and Avnery and his associates, who Shavit describes as "neither Left nor Right."

The group published a journal, Etgar (Hebrew: אתגר, "Challenge"), edited by Yellin-Mor, weekly or biweekly from April 1960 until March 1967. It also attempted to run for the Knesset. One of its founders, Yaakov Yeredor (a former Lehi member), represented the Arab nationalist group al-Ard in three of its trials.

In December 1960 several members of Semitic Action (Avnery, Yellin-Mor, Ghilan, Cohen, and Kenan) created the Israeli Committee for a Free Algeria, a group supportive of the FLN in the Algerian War, in opposition to Israel's official policy. The impetus for this decision came from Henri Curiel, who had introduced Avnery to members of the FLN and suggested to him that an independent Algeria would repay Israeli support by becoming Israel's first friend in the region.

== 2011 group ==
Semitic Action was revived in early 2011 as a grassroots peace movement by activists seeking what they call "a revolutionary alternative to foreign-backed organizations that only exacerbate local frictions and bring the peoples of our region further from genuine peace."

The new Semitic Action describes itself as "an Israel-based movement seeking to unite the indigenous peoples of the Middle East against the devastating influence of foreign powers in our region and the local conflicts created by the pursuit of their interests. Since its resurrection, the movement has organized meetings between Palestinians and Israeli settlers in the West Bank, initiated campaigns to raise support for an independent Kurdistan and promoted a unified front of indigenous peoples against foreign political influences in the Middle East. The movement has also been vocal against westernization, globalization, pro-Israel support from the American Christian right, Islamophobia in Israeli society, capitalism and the funding of local political organizations by foreign governments.
