= Nimrod (sculpture) =

Sculpture by Yitzhak Danziger

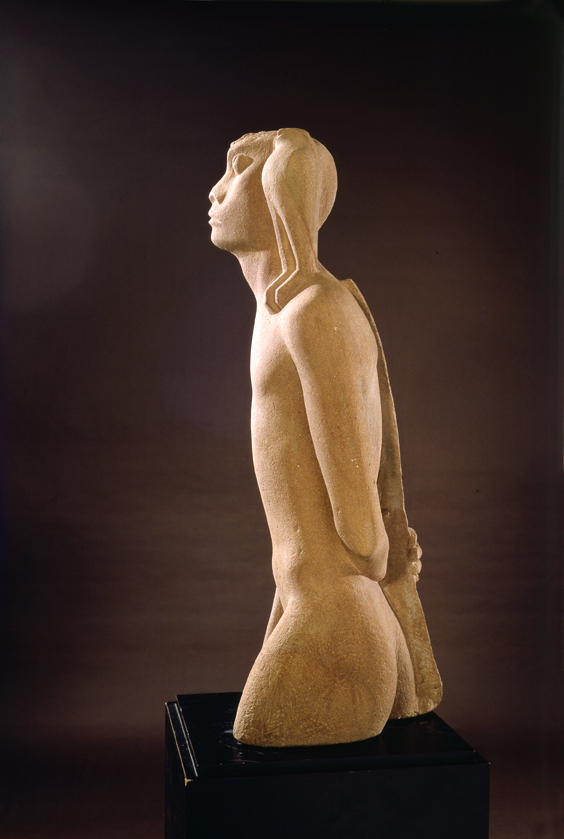
- Artist: Yitzhak Danziger
- Medium: Nubian sandstone
- Movement: Canaanism
- Dimensions: 95 cm × 33 cm (37 in × 13 in)
- Location: Israel Museum, Jerusalem; 31°46′45.32″N 35°13′24.9″E

"Nimrod" is a sculpture made of Nubian Sandstone, sculpted by Yitzhak Danziger in the years 1938–1939. The sculpture serves as a visual emblem of the Canaanism movement in Mandatory Palestine. The sculpture references the figure "Nimrod" from the Bible, which is described as a mythical figure of a hunter, interpreted to be a rebel against God.

== Description ==
The statue, 95 cm high, 33 cm wide and 33 cm deep, was carved from red Nubian Sandstone. The name of the sculpture, "Nimrod", references the biblical Nimrod, a figure mentioned in the Book of Genesis and Books of Chronicles. In Jewish culture, Nimrod is perceived as a Canaanite hunter figure who rebelled against God and Abraham. The word "Nimrod" in Hebrew means "we shall rebel".

In the sculpture, Nimrod, the biblical hunter, is depicted as a lean youth, naked and uncircumcised, with a sword on his back and a hawk perched on his shoulder.

== History ==
The sculpture was initially proposed as a relief for a wall in the Hebrew University, but the proposal was later rejected. The sculpture was exhibited for the first time in 1944 at the Habima Theatre in Tel Aviv, at the 'General Exhibition of the Young People of Eretz Israel'.

In 1947, the sculpture was exhibited at the Bezalel Museum in Jerusalem. In 1952, the sculpture appeared in an exhibition of the Israel Painters and Sculptors Association in the Tel Aviv Museum of Art.

Yitzhak Danziger sculpted "Nimrod" from Nubian sandstone, which was brought from the Nabatean city of Petra in Jordan by Arab workers of the Dead Sea Works.

The original sculpture, made of stone, was sold to The Israel Museum by Yitzhak Dazinger's widow. Following Dazinger's death, 8 bronze recreations of the sculpture were cast. The casting mold of these copies were made for his family members.

In October 2001, a counterfeit version of the sculpture was sold through Sotheby's, a British auction house. The counterfeit copy was made at the foundry that created the official copies of the sculpture, meaning that the counterfeit copy looked authentic. The counterfeit copy was sold for 22,000 dollars to a person named Arnold Druck, who then decided to put it up for auction. After legal intervention by Dazinger's widow, Sonia, the counterfeit sculpture was removed from sale, and subsequently destroyed following a court order.

In June 2006, a bronze copy of the statue was sold for $80000 US dollars. In 2009, an additional copy was put on sale for 840,000 shekels at "Golconda Library" in Tel Aviv.

== See also ==
- Visual arts in Israel
