= Namrud =

Namrud نمرود
- village
- Location within Iran
- Coordinates: 35°44′07″N 52°40′40″E
- Country: Iran
- Province: Tehran
- County: Firuzkuh
- Bakhsh: Central
- Rural District: Shahrabad
- Elevation: 1,850 m (6,070 ft)

Population (2011)
  - Total: 24
- Time zone: UTC+3:30 (IRST)

Namrud (Persian: نمرود, also Romanized as Namrūd and Nīmrūd) is a village in Shahrabad Rural District, in the Central District of Firuzkuh County, Tehran Province, Iran.

At the time of the 2006 National Census, the village's population was 28 in 10 households. The following census in 2011 counted 24 people in nine households. The 2016 census measured less than 4 households.
