= Boaz Evron =

Israeli journalist (1927–2018)

- בועז עברון
- Born: August 6, 1927; Jerusalem, Mandatory Palestine
- Died: September 15, 2018 (aged 91); Israel
- Education: Hebrew University
- Family: Yoel Moshe Salomon (grandfather)

Boaz Evron (Hebrew: בועז עברון; June 6, 1927 - September 15, 2018), alternatively transliterated Boas Evron was a left-wing Israeli journalist and critic.

== Early life and education ==
Evron was born in Jerusalem. He attended Herzliya Hebrew High School and Hebrew University. Evron's family had lived in Palestine since the early nineteenth century; he was a great-grandson of Yoel Moshe Salomon, one of the founders of Petah Tikva.

== Career ==
He was a member of Lehi and the Canaanite movement early in his life and remained critical of Zionism and supportive of some of Canaanism's tenets. In 1956 he co-founded the political group Semitic Action. His writings were published in Semitic Action's journal Etgar and in Tzipor HaNefesh, a paper edited by Amos Kenan and Dahn Ben-Amotz.

He worked for Haaretz from 1956 to 1964 and for Yediot Aharonot from 1964 to 1992. At Yediot, Evron wrote a column which appeared on the same page as Kenan's; their page in the paper was given the satirical nickname "Fatahland" in reference to their perceived sympathy for the Palestinians. He also translated books by Bertrand Russell and Edith Nesbit into Hebrew. Evron was the director of the Beit Zvi theater school from 1970 until 1979. He was on the editorial board of the Palestine-Israel Journal.

== Death ==
Evron died in 2018 at the age of 91.

== Published works ==
=== Books ===
In Hebrew

- מידה של חירות (Midah shel Herut), 1975
- החשבון הלאומי (HaHeshbon Haleumi, A National Reckoning), 1988

In English

- Jewish State or Israeli Nation?, Indiana University Press, 1995. (An adaptation of HaHeshbon Haleumi)
