= Nimrud, Iran =

Nimrud نيمرود
- Village
- Location within Iran
- Coordinates: 29°09′10″N 56°38′07″E
- Country: Iran
- Province: Kerman
- County: Baft
- Bakhsh: Central
- Rural District: Bezenjan

Population (2006)
  - Total: 35
- Time zone: UTC+3:30 (IRST)
  - Summer (DST): UTC+4:30 (IRDT)

Nimrud (Persian: نيمرود, also Romanized as Nīmrūd; also known as Nīmrūd-e Maḩmūdī) is a village in Bezenjan Rural District, in the Central District of Baft County, Kerman Province, Iran. At the 2006 census, its population was 35, in 10 families.
