= Nimrod (disambiguation) =

Nimrod is a biblical king.

Nimrod may also refer to:

== Fictional characters ==
- Nimrod Gaunt, a character from Philip Kerr's Children of the Lamp
- Nimrod (vampire), a vampire from the black-and-white Marvel Comics Dracula Lives! series
- Nimrod (comics), a fictional robot mutant-hunter from Marvel Comics' Uncanny X-Men series
- Nimrod or Nim, a reptile in the television series Surface
- Nimrod the Scarlet Sentinel, a villain in Mighty Morphin Power Rangers
- Nimrod, a character from Robert Ludlum's The Matlock Paper

== Military ==
- HMS Nimrod, six ships of the Royal Navy
- Hawker Nimrod, a 1930s British fighter aircraft
- Hawker Siddeley Nimrod, a Royal Air Force maritime patrol aircraft, 1969–2011
  - BAE Systems Nimrod MRA4, a planned upgrade of the Hawker Siddeley Nimrod, developed in the 2000s
  - British Aerospace Nimrod AEW3, a planned AEW version of the Hawker Siddeley Nimrod, developed in the late 1970s/early 1980s
- 40M Nimród, a Hungarian anti-aircraft tank from World War II
- Nimrod (missile), an Israeli anti-tank guided missile
- Operation Nimrod, the SAS assault during the Iranian Embassy siege, London, 1980

== Music ==
- Nimrod (album), a 1997 album by Green Day
- Variation IX (Adagio) "Nimrod", the 9th variation in the 1899 composition Enigma Variations by Edward Elgar
- Nimrod, a band fronted by Zev Asher

== People ==
- Charles James Apperley (1777–1843), English sportsman and author, pseudonym Nimrod
- Nimród Antal (born 1973), Hungarian-American film director
- Nimrod Botelanga (1953 or 1954–2013), Nauruan politician
- Nimrod Kamer (born 1981), satirist and journalist
- Nimrod Levi (born 1995), Israeli basketball player
- Nimrod Mashiah (born 1988), Israeli windsurfer
- Nimrod Megiddo, 20th-21st century Israeli mathematician and computer scientist
- Nimrod Ping (1947–2006), politician in Brighton, England
- Nimrod Sejake (1920-2004), South African labor leader
- Nimrod Shapira Bar-Or (born 1989), Israeli Olympic swimmer
- Nimrod Tishman (born 1991), Israeli basketball player
- Nimrod Whitacre (1822–1892), American politician from Virginia
- Nimrod Workman (1895–1994), American folk singer and trade unionist

== Places ==
=== Antarctica ===
- Nimrod Glacier, in the Oates Land region
- Mount Nimrod, in the Dominion Range, within the Ross Dependency region

=== Golan Heights ===
- Nimrod (Israeli settlement), an Israeli settlement
- Nimrod Fortress, fortress on Mount Hermon

=== United States ===
- Nimrod, Arkansas, an unincorporated community
- Nimrod, Minnesota, a city
- Nimrod, Montana, a ghost town
- Nimrod, Oregon, an unincorporated community
- Nimrod, Texas, an unincorporated community

=== Elsewhere ===
- Nimrod Province, Afghanistan
- Nimrud, an ancient city in Mesopotamia (modern-day Iraq)
- Mount Nimrod, in the Canterbury Region, New Zealand
- Nemrut (volcano), Turkey

== Science and technology ==
- Nimrod (computer), an early computer to play Nim
- Nimrod (distributed computing), a tool for distributed parametric modelling
- Nimrod (synchrotron), a proton synchrotron which operated at the Rutherford Appleton Laboratory until 1978
- Nimrod (programming language), former name of Nim
- Project NIMROD, a meteorological field study

== Vehicles ==
- List of ships named Nimrod
  - Nimrod (ship), the ship used by Ernest Shackleton during his 1908 Antarctic expedition
    - Nimrod Expedition, to the Antarctic
- Nimrod Racing Automobiles, a British racing constructor and team formed through a partnership with Aston Martin
  - Nimrod NRA/C2, a racing car built by Nimrod Racing Automobiles

== Other uses ==
- Nimrod International Journal of Prose and Poetry, a literary journal published by the University of Tulsa
- Nimrods, a mascot for Watersmeet Township, Michigan's schools
- Nimrod, a dramatic poem by Robert William Jameson
- Nimrod (sculpture), a sculpture by Yitzhak Danziger
- Valley of Nimrod, referenced in the Book of Mormon

== See also ==
- Nimrud (disambiguation)
