= Robert Masson =

French WWII spy (1914–2010)

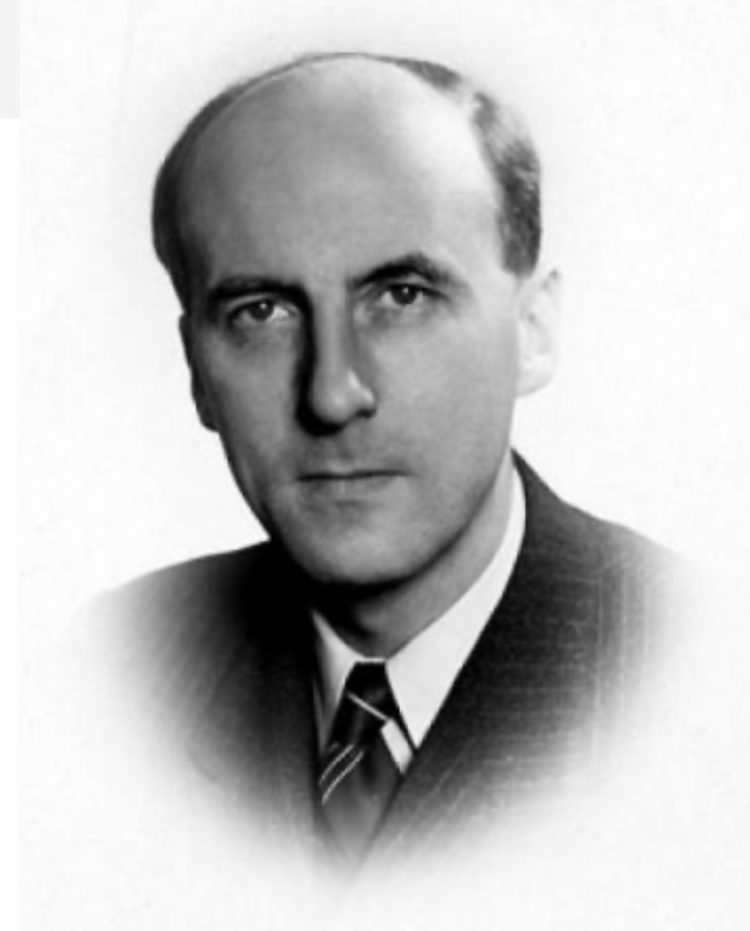
- Born: January 19, 1914; Paris
- Died: October 24, 2010 (aged 96); Versailles
- Burial place: Jullouville
- Other name: Samson
- Alma mater: École Centrale
- Military career
- Branch: Air Force
- Service years: 1939-1945
- Rank: Commandant
- Conflicts: Second World War

Robert Masson (ʁobɛʁ masɔ̃, 1914–2010) was a French Air Force spy and Companion of the Liberation.

In 1941, he was put in contact with Ceux de la Libération in Paris. After the Allied landings in North Africa, he crossed Spain illegally to reach Algiers and then London. He parachuted twice into occupied France, where he set up the Samson resistance network. Picked up by the Royal Air Force in early June 1944, he commanded the London branch of the DGSS during the Battle of Normandy.

== Biography ==
Robert Masson was born in Paris on January 19, 1914. He studied at the École Centrale. After his father's death in 1935, he ran the family business for a few months. He then served in the French Air Force in 1936–1937, at the Military Aviation School. He was mobilized in 1939 as a reserve second lieutenant.

=== Second World War ===
Robert Masson was in Fez on June 17, 1940, when he heard Marshal Pétain’s speech on the radio announcing the surrender. Demobilized in August and wishing to join the Royal Air Force, he tried in vain to reach Gibraltar. In Agadir, he learned that a Resistance network was being organized in France. He took the boat for Marseille in January 1941 and went to Vichy, where he met Paul Badré in a café. Masson was recruited as an agent for the semi-clandestine intelligence service set up by Georges Ronin.

He became a liaison officer with Ceux de la Libération in Paris, a 10,000-strong movement founded by three former Air Force pilots. To cross the demarcation line, he obtained a border pass in Loches, which enabled him to pass through the Kommandantur controls in Cormery. Every month, he brought information to Bellerive near Vichy, where Paul Badré lived with his family and communicated by radio with the Secret Intelligence Service in London. To pass on urgent information, Masson sent messages written in invisible ink from the Austerlitz Station to an address in Vichy.

He used his job in the film industry as a cover. For his friends, Masson was a collaborator of Jean Clerc, manager of the Société Universelle de Films. Between 1941 and 1942, he attended the shooting of three movies: Montmartre (with Edith Piaf), Mademoiselle Swing and Le Grand Combat.

==== Spain ====
On November 10, 1942, following Operation Torch, the SR Air officers flew to Algiers, leaving Captain René Gervais in charge of the network in France. Masson decided to reach Algeria by smuggling through Spain. On Christmas Day 1942, he crossed the border between Montréjeau and Vielha e Mijaran, where he was arrested by the Civil Guard. In the early days of January 1943, during a transfer to Lleida, he escaped with six other Frenchmen, who were once again arrested near Artesa de Segre.

Imprisoned in Lleida, he was released on January 23, thanks to his false identity and the intervention of a friend in Barcelona. He travelled to Madrid by train and was received at the US Embassy by Colonel Malaise. Masson was then taken to Seville and Algeciras. On the evening of February 8, he boarded a fishing boat with seventeen Frenchmen, including René de Naurois. At Gibraltar, he took a liner for Casablanca.

==== First Mission in France ====
He was welcomed in Algiers by Georges Ronin, who sent him to London (where Paul Badré was in contact with MI6 and colonel Passy’s BCRA). Masson volunteered to parachute into France and received a false passport in the name of Samson.

Masson underwent parachute training at Ringway and then a Pick-Up course near Cambridge. He was also trained in cryptography and radio communication.

In London, he chose as his drop zone the Broglie-Orbec-Bernay triangle, where he could take refuge in his mother's property on the edge of Taillefer Wood. He obtained a Halifax from the Royal Air Force: operation Lobelia was scheduled for the night of April 11–12, 1943. Masson parachuted into Normandy shortly after midnight.

Three days later, he moved into his brother Gérard's apartment in Paris. Reactivating his cover at the Société Universelle de Films, he renewed his contacts with René Gervais in Vichy and with Ceux de la Libération in Paris. He recruited André Feret-Patin, Emile Corouge and François Aubry, to whom he gave the mission of directing the Samson organization and establishing radio transmissions with London.

Paul Badré, who was planning the air exfiltration of General Georges at the request of Churchill's cabinet, decided to include Masson in the operation, which took place on May 20, 1943, in the Cévennes. After a short stay in Algiers, he returned to London, where he met Colonel Passy and organized MI6 radio communications with Samson.

On June 12, Masson flew to Marrakesh. He was promoted to captain and joined the bomber group commanded by Badré, stationed at Oran then Mediouna. In Algiers, Ronin lost control of the Secret Service to the Gaullists.

==== Second Mission in France ====
On July 6, 1943, the Gestapo caught Corouge in the middle of a radio transmission in Suresnes. Feret-Patin was arrested the following night in Rue d'Assas, Paris. They were both interrogated Rue des Saussaies and Avenue Foch, where they were subjected to waterboarding, before being deported to Germany in October 1943. On December 26, André Duthilleul (Oscar), another of Paul Badré's agents, sheltered by his brother Jean Badré in Paris, was caught in a Gestapo mousetrap. He tried to escape but was shot in the back. Hospitalized at the Pitié-Salpêtrière Hospital, Oscar was then incarcerated at Fresnes and frequently tortured Rue des Saussaies.

Masson volunteered for a second mission in occupied France. He flew to London in January 1944. On February 9, he parachuted over Ménétréol-sur-Sauldre in the Sologne region. No longer safe in his brother Gérard's apartment, he lived in Neuilly-sur-Seine. In a café near the Champs-Élysées, he met René Gervais, who instructed him to integrate five SR Air posts (Brittany, Normandy, Paris, Troyes and Laon) into Samson organization. Hunted by the Nazis, Gervais was exfiltrated by plane with four of his agents on the night of March 6–7.

Financially supported by Alexandre de Saint-Phalle, Samson expanded under the leadership of François Aubry and Jean Rousseau-Portalis (Billy). By the end of the Occupation, the network had more than a thousand members.

Put on Oscar's trail by Jean Badré, Masson set off with his men to try to free him from the Royallieu camp, but they had to give up because of the sheer number of SS guards. He was exfiltrated on the night of June 2–3 by the Royal Air Force, near Compiègne, with Jean Rousseau-Portalis and his brother Gérard Masson.

In London, Wilfred Dunderdale informed him of the imminent D-Day. Masson commanded the London office of the DGSS (the new French secret service) during the Battle of Normandy. He crossed the Channel on September 2, 1944.

On June 18, 1945, on the Place de la Concorde, Robert Masson, Jean Rousseau-Portalis and René Gervais were decorated by General de Gaulle with the Cross of the Order of the Liberation.

=== After the War ===
He left the army in December 1945 and became an executive in the aeronautics industry. When Sud-Aviation was created in 1957, he became commercial director of Sferma (headed by Paul Badré). He was also a manager of SOCATA. In 1970, he became director of the Bagnoles-de-l'Orne spa. His war memories were published in 1975.

Robert Masson died on October 24, 2010, in Versailles. His body is buried in Jullouville.

== Awards ==
- Commander of the Legion of Honour
- Companion of the Liberation
- War Cross 1939-1945
- Belgian War Cross
- Officer of the Belgian Crown
- King's Medal for Courage in the Cause of Freedom
