= Yehoshua (given name) =

Yehoshua is a masculine given name related to Joshua. People named Yehoshua include:

- Gerónimo de Santa Fe (fl. 1550–1620), Spanish physician and religious writer born Yehosúa ben Yosef
- Yehoshua Cohen (1922-1986), assassin of Swedish Count Folke Bernadotte
- Yehoshua Leib Diskin (1818–1898), Lithuanian rabbi, Talmudist and Biblical commentator
- Yehoshua Rabinovitz (1911–1979), Israeli government minister and mayor of Tel Aviv
- Yehoshua Rokeach (1825–1894), second Rebbe of the Belz Hasidic dynasty, born in the Austrian Empire
- Yehoshua Rozin (1918–2002), Egyptian-born Israeli basketball coach
- Yehoshua Schwartz (born 1954), Israeli basketball player
- Yehoshua Sobol (born 1939), Israeli playwright, writer, and director
- Yehoshua Zettler (1917–2009), Jerusalem commander of the Jewish paramilitary group Lehi (Stern gang), planned and carried out the assassination of Swedish Count Folke Bernadotte
