= René Gervais =

Decorated French WWII officer (1908–1997)

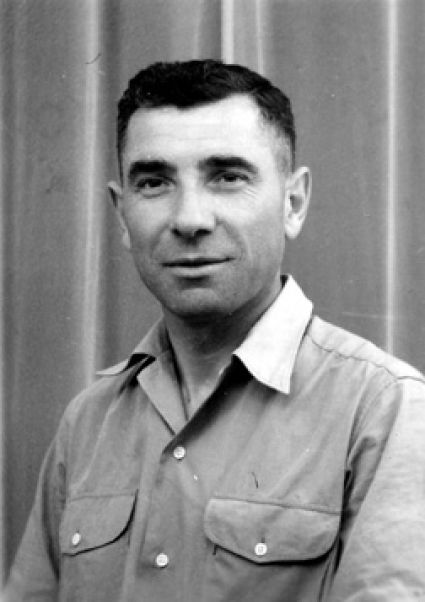
- Born: August 22, 1908; La Teste-de-Buch, Gascony
- Died: October 22, 1997 (aged 89); Port-Louis, Brittany
- Other name: René Gérard
- Education: École polytechnique
- Military career
- Branch: Air Force
- Service years: 1930-1946
- Rank: Colonel
- Conflicts: Second World War

René Gervais, OBE (ʁəne ʒɛʁvɛː 1908–1997) was a French aircraft pilot and spy, Companion of the Liberation.

A member of Georges Ronin's intelligence service, he became head of the organization in mainland France after the Allied landings in North Africa. Hunted by the Gestapo, he flew to Algiers in March 1944 and took command of a section of the DGSS.

== Biography ==
René Gervais was born on August 22, 1908, in La Teste-de-Buch. He was the son of carpenter Louis Gervais and schoolteacher Léonie Victorine Courage.

After graduating from the École polytechnique, he joined the Air Force in 1930. He commanded a bomber squadron at the Cazaux Air Base, before being transferred to the Villacoublay flight test center in May 1939.

=== Second World War ===
On the eve of the Armistice of 22 June 1940, René Gervais took off for Oran, where he met up with Paul Badré and Georges Ronin. The latter decided to rebuild an intelligence service in France (SR Air).

In September 1940, Gervais (code name René Gérard) volunteered to observe the German presence on the other side of the Pyrenees at the Spanish border. Based in Perpignan, he was of little use, as the SR Air was already in contact with Colonel Malaise in Madrid.

In the summer of 1941, he became Paul Badré's assistant in Bellerive (a village near Vichy) where intelligence was radioed to MI6 in London. His task was to gather information on the Luftwaffe in the Occupied Zone and on the German aircraft industry.

On the night of November 9–10, 1942, a few hours before the invasion of the Free Zone, Georges Ronin and his main officers flew to Algeria, leaving Gervais in charge of the organization in France.

He made contact with Captain Boiron (head of the Marseille station, who chose to stay on), Philouze (former deputy of the Limoges station), Henri Pascal (one of the founders of Ceux de la Libération, head of the Narbonne station) and Raymond Puechberty (who was in charge of transferring mail to Spain). Radio broadcasts were resumed with SR Air in Algiers. On January 9, 1943, the Gestapo searched Gervais Vichy home.

Paul Badré, head of the London branch, organized the parachuting of André Duthilleul (Oscar), on the night of March 14–15, 1943. Introduced to Gervais by Philouze, Oscar brought him a transceiver and a transmission plan. Transmissions with London began two weeks later. On the night of April 11–12, another agent, Robert Masson ("Samson"), was parachuted into France by the Royal Air Force. In Vichy, he met with Gervais, who agreed to set up independent networks to compartmentalize their activities.

SR Air was divided into five sectors (Paris, Laon, Troyes, Brittany and Normandy) which soon had their own radio broadcasts with London. Two additional networks were integrated into SR Air: that of Pierre Pontal (Petrus) and that of Maurice Challe (François-Villon).

Gervais was picked up on October 16, 1943, from a field near Estrées-Saint-Denis, to liaise with London and Algiers. A month later, he landed on the same Estrées-Saint-Denis airfield on the night of November 12–13. At the Vichy train station, Jourdan, one of his agents, informed him that the Gestapo had raided his home precisely this morning.

On October 30, Garrisson (Guillemet), secretary to Boiron, head of the Marseille post, had been arrested by the Germans who found on him the address of Gervais, as well as those of Boiron, Pascal and Koenig (Pascal's assistant in Narbonne). All three were arrested and tortured by the Gestapo. René Gervais decided to leave Vichy for good.

On December 25, 1943, Oscar was arrested by the Gestapo in Paris. He was shot during an escape attempt and sentenced to deportation. Gervais himself miraculously avoided a Nazi mousetrap.

In February, Robert Masson was parachuted back into France. He met Gervais in a café near the Champs-Élysées and was given the task of integrating the five SR Air posts into his Samson organization. Particularly threatened by the Gestapo, Gervais was picked-up by the Royal Air Force on the night of March 6–7, 1944, at the Estrées-Saint-Denis airfield.

In Algiers, he was appointed head of a section of the DGSS. As Operation Overlord approached, SR Air focused on locating German radars and V1 missiles launch facilities.

=== After the War ===
He worked in Paris for the Secret Service until 1945, before returning to pilot training. Promoted to colonel, he left the Air Force in 1946.

He ran a food company and also worked as a consultant for Ratier in the 1960s. In 1972, he became vice-president of the French Aeronautical Federation.

René Gervais died on October 22, 1997, in Port-Louis, Morbihan, where he was buried.

== Awards ==
- Commander of the Legion of Honour
- Companion of the Liberation
- War Cross 1939-1945
- Aeronautical Medal
- Officer of the British Empire
