= Paul Badré =

French aircraft pilot and engineer (1906–2000)

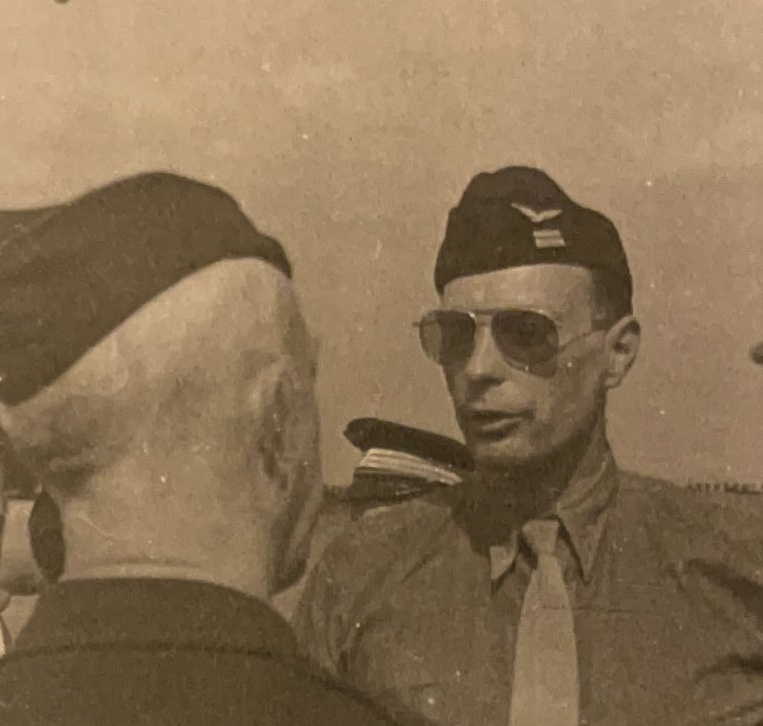
- Paul Badré in 1945
- Born: May 22, 1906; Saint-Saëns, Seine-Maritime
- Died: August 10, 2000 (aged 94) La Ferrière-Bochard, Orne
- Branch: Air Force
- Service years: 1929 – 1946
- Rank: Colonel
- Conflicts: World War II
- Alma mater: École polytechnique

Paul Badré (pɔl badʁe, 1906-2000) was a French aircraft pilot and aeronautical engineer who fought in the Second World War.

A member of Georges Ronin's intelligence service, he radioed information to the Allies from his village of Bellerive, near Vichy. His clandestine broadcasts continued until his departure for Algiers after Operation Torch. He was sent to London in 1943 as liaison officer with MI6 and Colonel Passy’s BCRA. In the summer of 1944, he commanded a bomber squadron during Operation Dragoon.

== Biography ==
Paul Badré was born in Saint-Saëns on May 22, 1906. He was the son of Claire Maire (1884-1934) and forester Louis Badré (1875-1969), officer of the Legion of Honour. He was the eldest of six children: Louis Badré (director of the National Forests Office), Jean Badré (Vicar for the French Army and Bishop of Bayeux), Jacques Badré (priest of Semallé), Charles Badré (known as Father Jean, a Benedictine monk killed in Cambodia by the Khmer Rouge in 1975) and Marie Badré.

In 1926, Paul Badré entered the École Polytechnique in Paris. Two years later, he joined the French Air Force, serving as a second lieutenant at the Military and Aeronautical School in Versailles. He obtained his pilot's license in 1929 and joined the 21st Aviation Regiment in Nancy.

=== Test Pilot ===
In the spring of 1935, Paul Badré was transferred (at the same time as Constantin Rozanoff) to the Aircraft test center of the Villacoublay Air Base. He flew on Bloch MB.220, Douglas DC-2, Potez 540 and Leo 45 prototypes.

At the time of the Munich Agreement, in September 1938, he carried out a reconnaissance mission for the Secret Intelligence Service and the “Air” section of the Deuxième Bureau (commanded by his friend Georges Ronin). Captain Badré photographed the Alps and the Po Valley 10 kilometers above the ground, aboard a Potez 540.

=== WWII ===
At the start of the French Mobilization, on September 1, 1939, he was assigned to the Orléans Air Base. In December, he was sent to Scotland (at RAF Leuchars, then commanded by Brian Edmund Baker) for flight testing of new radar technologies. In the spring of 1940, at the request of the Air Staff, he visited bomber squadrons in the South-West of France to monitor pilot training on Leo 45. On the eve of the Armistice, he took off for Oran (Algeria). There, he reunited with Georges Ronin, who decided to rebuild an intelligence service in France in touch with the British.

As a German speaker, Paul Badré was assigned in mid-August to the Armistice Commission, where he served as liaison officer with the Luftwaffe. His mission lasted until January 1941. He then settled with his family in Bellerive-sur-Allier, a village near Vichy.

==== Vichy ====
He became a member of the semi-clandestine intelligence service set up by Georges Ronin. In March 1941, Frederick Winterbotham (codename Summer), a Royal Air Force and MI6 officer in charge of the Ultra intelligence, sent Ronin's network transceivers concealed in diplomatic bags. From his villa in Bellerive, Paul Badré (code name Beard) clandestinely established radio communications with England (Greenland).

He recruited several agents, including Robert Masson, whom he put in contact with Ceux de la Libération in Paris. Crossing the demarcation line, Masson brought him information every month. Badré obtained from Colonel Jean Touzet du Vigier that weapons be secretly delivered in the occupied zone to Ceux de la Libération and Alfred Heurteaux's resistance network.

In the spring of 1942, PTT engineer Robert Keller and his team were able to tap German telephone communications between Paris and Berlin, intercepting the exchanges of high-ranking Kriegsmarine, Luftwaffe, Wehrmacht Heer and Gestapo officials. They even managed to listen to the voice of Adolf Hitler. This intelligence source was codenamed K (for Keller). Transcripts of the collected conversations were delivered by doctor Victor Dupont to Bellerive, where Beard communicated them to the Allies. He notably transmitted information on German troop movements towards the Soviet Union. In the summer of 1942, his station carried out a daily radio broadcast with London, Madrid and Algiers. Ronin’s organization was also put in touch by Count Potocki with the Polish service of Stanisław Gano, for whom a second link with London was set up.

In early October, Paul Badré was summoned by General Revers (Chief of the Defence Staff) who warned him that, with Pierre Laval's agreement, the Abwehr and the Gestapo were preparing to send mobile teams into the free zone, to identify clandestine posts using radio direction finding. This operation was codenamed Aktion Donar. On the morning of October 19, 1942, German secret services were circulating in his village of Bellerive. Alerted in time by one of his technicians, he interrupted the broadcast in progress, dismantled his set and burned the compromising papers.

After this incident, informed of the imminent Operation Torch, the service suspended its broadcasts. On the night of November 9–10, 1942, hours before the invasion of the free zone, the main officers of Ronin's network flew to Algeria on two Dewoitine D.338 provided by General d’Harcourt.

==== London ====
Colonel Ronin sided with General Giraud and took command of the Secret Service alongside Louis Rivet and Paul Paillole. Ronin visited Winterbotham in London on December 20, shortly before the assassination of Admiral Darlan. Upon his return to Algiers on January 3, 1943, he appointed Major Badré as liaison officer with MI6 and colonel Passy’s BCRA (General de Gaulle's intelligence service).

Accompanied by two French recruits of the Special Operations Executive, Badré left for London on January 30. Initially housed in Albemarle Street, in Claude Dansey’s apartment (where he made the acquaintance of Colonel Passy), MI6 then moved him to a villa near Wimbledon Common. In Westminster, at 12 Caxton Street, he worked with Wilfred Dunderdale's Circus, which gathered intelligence on the Eastern Front.

In March, Badré broke his leg after a parachute jump at Ringway. While in hospital, he was visited by Robert Masson, who had made his way to England after having crossed Spain illegally. Masson (Samson) was parachuted over Normandy on the next full moon. Another agent was parachuted, André Duthilleul (Oscar).

On 20 May 1943, Major Badré arranged the aerial exfiltration of General Georges at the request of Churchill’s cabinet. Robert Masson was added to the operation and left France after creating the Samson organization.

On June 3, 1943, the armies of General de Gaulle and General Giraud united under the authority of the French Committee of National Liberation. At the age of 37, Badré still considered himself fit to pilot and fight. He submitted his resignation to Stewart Menzies (head of MI6) and left London on June 27, a few days before Operation Husky.

==== Mediterranean ====
Commanding the 2/52 bombardment group in the Mediterranean, Badré was stationed in the Oran region, with General du Vigier’s division. His troops were assigned for the winter to Mediouna, Morocco. In the spring, they trained in the region of Constantine, at Teleghma. It was only at the end of June that his group became operational, after the delivery by the United States Army Air Forces of 16 brand new Martin B-26 Marauder. On July 19, the 2/52 was sent to Sardinia, at the base of Villacidro. He received a visit from Saint-Exupéry, shortly before the writer’s death.

On August 3, 1944, Major Badré bombed a bridge in Asti with his squadron. Three days later, a 72-aircraft Franco-American formation attacked a railway bridge in Arles. The bombs from his Marauder fell on a cemetery where the German Flak had positioned itself. On August 15, the first day of Operation Dragoon, 72 bombers (36 from the French Liberation Army and 36 American Flying Fortresses) had the mission to destroy bridges over the Buëch and the Durance. The weather was unfavorable and during a manoeuvre to avoid a collision, a USAAF pilot accidentally dropped several bombs on the town of Sisteron, causing the death of about 100 civilians.

On August 18, Badré's group attacked the coastal artillery near Toulon and suffered heavy losses. Two days later, they tried a stealthier tactic which proved successful. The 2/52 then fought in Italy.

=== Post-war aeronautical industry ===
Promoted to Lieutenant Colonel in September 1944, he was appointed head of the Fifth Bureau ("programs") of the Air Force General Staff. He supervised the mission d’information scientifique et technique (MIST), which sent a commando to the American occupation zone in Germany to capture Willy Messerschmitt and seize his work, which were microfilmed by students of polytechnique before being returned to the Americans. The MIST also took possession of a V-2 rockets launch facility hidden in the forest between Sigmaringen and Lake Constance.

On August 1, 1945, Paul Badré was the first Frenchman to fly a jet aircraft (a german Messerschmitt Me 262) on national territory, during the inauguration of the Brétigny-sur-Orge flight test center. He left the army in October 1946, shortly before the outbreak of the Indochina War.

In civilian life, Paul Badré was first in charge of flight tests for the Snecma, (the national manufacturer of aircraft engines). Georges Glasser recruited him in 1948 as the production director of the SNCASO. He was involved in the development of three fighter aircraft by Marcel Dassault (the Ouragan, the Mystère II, and the Mystère IV) as well as in the production of the supersonic Vautour and the Djinn helicopter by SNCASO.

When Sud Aviation was created, he became the president of Sferma (1957-1965) and then of Maroc-Aviation (1966-1972). He was also on the board of Ratier Figeac (1962–1979) and Jean Bertin’s company (1965–1981), whose Aérotrain project was set aside by the French government following the 1973 oil crisis.

Paul Badré died at the age of 94, on August 10, 2000, in La Ferrière-Bochard (Orne). He was married to Cécile Cordier (1909-2005). Ten children were born from their union.

He was an honorary member of the French Air and Space Academy and a Fellow of the British Royal Aeronautical Society.

== Awards ==
- Commander of the Legion of Honour (1955)
- War Cross 1939-1945
- Resistance Medal
- Aeronautical Medal
