= Georges Ronin =

French Air Force General (1894–1954)

- Born: January 20, 1894; Cherbourg, Manche
- Died: May 8, 1954 (aged 60); Val-de-Grâce, Paris
- Education: Saint-Cyr Military Academy
- Military career
- Branch: Air Force
- Service years: 1913–1944
- Rank: Général

Georges Ronin (French pronunciation: [ʒɔʁʒ ʁɔnɛ̃]; 1894–1954) was a general of the French Air Force, and the leader of a Resistance organization during World War II.

As the commanding officer of the Deuxième Bureau’s aerial section before the war, Ronin created in 1941 a clandestine intelligence service in the German occupied zone. Through his friend Frederick Winterbotham, radio transmissions were established with MI6 in London. After Operation Torch, in November 1942, he flew to Algiers where he was appointed head of Secret Service by General Giraud. He was dismissed when General de Gaulle became the sole leader of the French government in exile.

== Life ==
Georges Ronin was the son of Emmanuel Ronin (1860–1943), a captain in the French Navy, and Anna Bergasse du Petit Thouars (1864–1954), daughter of Vice Admiral du Petit Thouars. He was the younger brother of General Emmanuel Ronin (1886–1953).

=== First World War ===
In 1913, Georges Ronin was admitted to the Special Military School of Saint-Cyr. On August 6, 1914, after mobilization, he joined the 16th Dragoon Regiment of the 5th Cavalry Division.

On September 9, 1914, his squadron was surrounded by the enemy in the forest, a few kilometers southwest of Soissons, not far from Mortefontaine. At twilight, a peasant informed the French dragoons that 8 Aviatik were stationed nearby for the night. At 1 a.m., the 40 dragoons charged the German planes. Squadron commander Gaston de Gironde and second lieutenant Gaudin de Villaine were killed by machine gun fire, while Henri de Kérillis was seriously injured. The German squadron leader was killed and his 8 aircraft were destroyed. This skirmish, which preceded the First Battle of the Aisne, would become famous in the French army for its symbolic dimension (with medieval chivalry facing modern artillery and aviation). Second lieutenant Ronin was among the 27 French survivors and remained a prisoner near Leipzig until 1919.

After one year in Algeria, with the Chasseurs d'Afrique, Ronin joined the Air Force in 1921, at the Istres Air Base, first as an observer and then as a pilot in 1922. Promoted to captain and then major, he commanded a squadron in Nancy.

==== Intelligence Officer ====
From 1936 onwards, he was in charge of the aerial section of the Deuxième Bureau, led by Louis Rivet. His department was responsible for gathering information on the Luftwaffe and the Aeronautica Militare. In 1934, André Serot had recruited an officer of the General Staff of the Luftwaffe, who had been approached by Paul Stehlin and agreed to sell him the detailed plans of the German air rearmament program.

Georges Ronin met Wilfred Dunderdale (head of MI6 in Paris) and Frederick Winterbotham, his British counterpart in the Royal Air Force. He organized several aerial reconnaissance operations with Winterbotham. In the fall of 1937, Roger Henrard photographed Germany aboard a Farman. He completed 11 missions and took 3600 vertical and oblique shots. Paul Badré flew over the Alps and the Po Valley in September 1938 aboard a Potez 540. At the beginning of 1939, Roger Henrard and Roger Gerard piloted two Lockheed 12 (17 years before the first flight of the Lockheed U-2 for the CIA), photographing Germany, Austria, and Italy.

=== Second World War ===
During the Phoney War and the Battle of France, Georges Ronin commanded a bombing squadron. On the eve of the Armistice, he flew to Oran (Algeria). He quickly decided to rebuild an intelligence service in occupied France.

==== Vichy ====
General Bergeret, appointed Minister of Air by Marshal Pétain, asked Ronin to join him in Vichy in August 1940. He served as Bergeret's Chief of Staff and then in the Bureau of Anti-national Activities under the authority of Louis Rivet. He recruited twenty officers from the Air Force. The purpose of his organization (the SR Air) was to spy on the Luftwaffe (industry, occupied bases, military orders, radar, anti-aircraft defenses...) to transmit it to General Bergeret as well as to the Royal Air Force (this last point being unknown to the Armistice Army command, especially to the very Anglophobic Admiral Darlan, head of the government of Marshal Pétain).

Contact was resumed with MI6 through the intermediary of Colonel Malaise, military attaché in Madrid, and of his predecessor, Commander de Berroëta. In February 1941, Berroëta went to London where Winterbotham gave him diplomatic bags containing transceivers, broadcasting instructions and crystals. Radio communications with England were entrusted to Paul Badré, who ran an SR Air station from his home in Bellerive, near Vichy.

The clandestine activities of Ronin were at risk of being exposed as early as July 1941. Georges Groussard, a member of La Cagoule, met Winston Churchill in London at the request of General Huntziger (Minister of War) and Dr. Ménétrel (personal physician and advisor to Pétain). The news of this meeting quickly spread in Vichy and reached the ears of Admiral Darlan. Being a close friend of Groussard, Colonel Ronin was immediately suspected of working with the British Army. On July 16, he was arrested along with his deputy Jean Bezy, who was warned in time and managed to empty their office of compromising papers before the search. Ronin was released the next day, after being severely reprimanded by Darlan. He nevertheless continued his collaboration with MI6.

The SR Air had three main stations outside Vichy in the Free Zone. Limoges (commanded by Michel Bouvard) provided information about the strength and positions of the Luftwaffe in occupied territory after the Battle of Britain. The Lyon branch, led by Captain Richard, obtained valuable information about the construction of the Atlantic Wall. The Marseille station, which focused on Italy, was led by André Serot until he joined Paul Paillole (head of counter-espionage) in the spring of 1941. He was replaced by Commander de Berroëta, and then by Captain Boiron.

Three other stations were created in French North Africa (in Casablanca, Algiers, and Tunis). The latter, led by Lieutenant Lacat, radioed with the Maltese station of MI6 between October 1940 and the end of the Tunisian campaign in May 1943. Information was also sent to Gibraltar through the channel of the American consulate.

After Operation Torch, at the end of 1942, Lacat warned the Royal Air Force that a convoy of 27 German boats was transporting a motorized division to reinforce General Rommel's Afrika Korps in Libya. Bombed by the British, the convoy suffered heavy losses. Winston Churchill congratulated the informants, the organizers, and the pilots of this operation.

==== American landings in North Africa ====
On October 19, 1942, alerted by General Revers (Chief of the Defence Staff), Paul Badré narrowly escaped an operation set up by the Abwehr and the Gestapo to identify clandestine transmitters in the Free Zone. On November 2, SR Air was notified by the Americans of the imminent Operation Torch. General Bergeret flew to Algeria on November 5. During the night of November 9th to 10th, just hours before the German invasion of the Free Zone, Ronin, Bezy, Bouvard, and Badré took off for Biskra aboard two Dewoitine D.338 provided by General d'Harcourt.

In Algiers, Georges Ronin sided with General Giraud, who promoted him to the rank of brigadier general. In December 1942, at the request of the OSS and MI6, Ronin sent the secret mission Pearl Harbor to plan the Liberation of Corsica by coordinating with the local Resistance.

After the assassination of Admiral Darlan, General Giraud reorganized military intelligence by merging the three sections (Air Force, Land Force and Navy) into a new agency, the Direction des Services Speciaux (DSS), which was placed under the authority of General Ronin.

==== Conflict with the Gaullists ====
To reestablish contact with SR Air in France (now led by René Gervais), he once again relied on the British. He was in London on December 20, 1942, with Paul Paillole. Welcomed by Winterbotham and Dunderdale, he was introduced to Stewart Menzies, head of MI6. As the Casablanca Conference approached, Winston Churchill wanted to use Henri Giraud as a counterweight to Charles de Gaulle. Menzies proposed to Ronin to create a branch of the SR Air within the Secret Intelligence Service itself (which displeased Colonel Passy’s BCRA, the gaullist secret service). When he returned to Alger on January 3, 1943, he chose Paul Badré to lead this new London branch, with the mission of resuming radio broadcasts with René Gervais and overseeing the parachuting of agents into France (Robert Masson was among the volunteers).

On May 30, Charles de Gaulle landed in Algiers to meet with Henri Giraud. The two warlords announced on June 3 the establishment of a French Committee of National Liberation, of which they were co-presidents. Georges Ronin defended the strictly military function of his organization and did not accept the political authority of General de Gaulle. The rivalry with the Gaullists led to the sidelining of Giraud in November 1943. Ronin was forced into early retirement at the age of 49. Jacques Soustelle, a civilian, succeeded him as head of a new agency, the DGSS.

He continued to advise his former agents until the Liberation of France. In May 1944, Maurice Challe's network transmitted the order of battle of the Luftwaffe on the Atlantic coast. General Eisenhower's headquarters sent congratulations for this work. Processed by the SR Air in Algiers, the intelligence was delivered to General de Gaulle on June 3, three days before Operation Overlord. The organizations of Robert Masson and René Gervais located the V-1 missiles launch sites and enabled the neutralization of many enemy radars.

Georges Ronin died on May 8, 1954, in Paris, at the Val-de-Grâce. He was married to Odette Dubois de Saran (1907–1990) and lived in the 16th arrondissement of Paris.

== Awards ==
- Commander of the Legion of Honour (1948)
- War Cross 1914-1918
- War Cross 1939-1945
