= Folke Bernadotte =

Swedish diplomat (1895–1948)

- Count of Wisborg
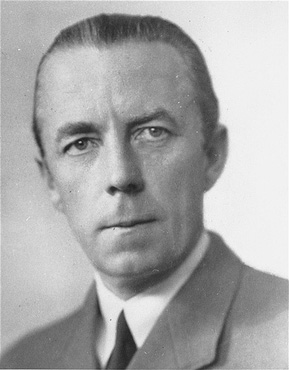
- Bernadotte in the mid 1940s
- Born: 2 January 1895; Stockholm, Sweden
- Died: 17 September 1948 (aged 53); Jerusalem
- Cause of death: Assassinated by Lehi
- Burial: Northern Cemetery, Solna
- Spouse: Estelle Romaine Manville (m. 1928)
- Issue: Count Gustaf Eduard; Count Folke; Count Fredrik Oscar; Count Bertil Oscar
- House: Bernadotte
- Father: Prince Oscar Bernadotte
- Mother: Ebba Munck af Fulkila

Folke Bernadotte, Count of Wisborg (Swedish: [fɔ̂l.kɛ̂ bæɳaˈdɔtː]; 2 January 1895 – 17 September 1948) was a Swedish nobleman and diplomat. In World War II, he negotiated the release of about 450 Danish Jews, about 10,000 Jews total, and 30,550 non-Jewish prisoners of many nations from the Nazi German Theresienstadt Ghetto. (Note: The precise number is not officially recorded. A count of the first 21,000 included 8,000 Danes and Norwegians, 5,911 Poles, 2,629 French, 1,615 stateless Jews and 1,124 Germans. The total number of Jews was 6,500 to 11,000 depending on definitions.) They were released on 14 April 1945. In 1945 he received a German surrender offer from Heinrich Himmler, though the offer was ultimately rejected by the allies.

After the war, Bernadotte was unanimously chosen to be the United Nations Security Council mediator in the Arab–Israeli conflict of 1947–1948. He was assassinated in Jerusalem in 1948 by the Zionist paramilitary group Lehi while pursuing his official duties. Upon his death, Ralph Bunche took up his work at the UN, mediating the 1949 Armistice Agreements between Israel and Egypt.

== Early life ==
Folke Bernadotte was born in Stockholm into the House of Bernadotte, the Swedish royal family. His father, Prince Oscar Bernadotte, Count of Wisborg (formerly Prince Oscar of Sweden, Duke of Gotland), was the second son of King Oscar II of Sweden; his mother, Ebba Munck af Fulkila, had been a lady-in-waiting to Victoria of Baden, the wife of Crown Prince Gustaf. Oscar had married Ebba without the consent of the King, and so was forced to renounce his Swedish titles; in 1892, he was granted the titles of Prince Bernadotte and Count of Wisborg by his uncle, Adolphe, Grand Duke of Luxembourg.

Bernadotte attended school in Stockholm, after which he entered training to become a cavalry officer at the Royal Military Academy. He took the officer's exam in 1915, was commissioned a lieutenant in 1918, and subsequently was promoted to the rank of major.

Bernadotte represented Sweden in 1933 at the Chicago Century of Progress Exposition, and later served as Swedish commissioner general at the New York World's Fair in 1939–40. Bernadotte had long been involved with the Swedish Boy Scouts (Sveriges Scoutförbund), and took over as director of the organization in 1937. At the outbreak of World War II, Bernadotte worked to integrate the scouts into Sweden's defense plan, training them in anti-aircraft work and as medical assistants. Bernadotte was appointed Vice Chairman of the Swedish Red Cross in 1943.

== Diplomatic career ==
=== World War II ===
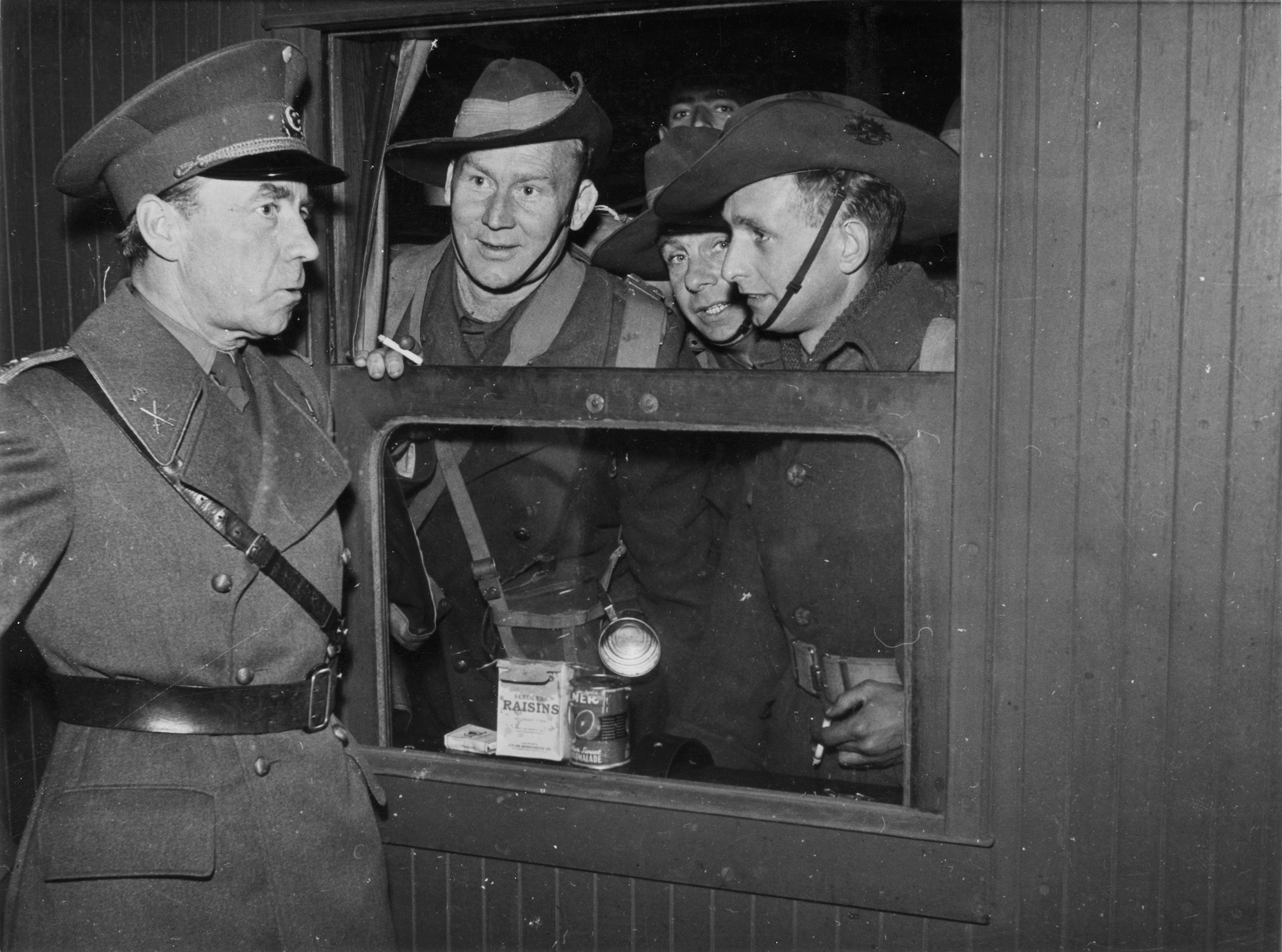
Count Folke Bernadotte (left) talking to Australian prisoners of war in Sweden during a prisoner exchange, 1943

During the autumns of 1943 and 1944, he organized prisoner exchanges which brought home 11,000 prisoners from Germany via Sweden. While Vice-president of the Swedish Red Cross in 1945, Bernadotte attempted to negotiate an armistice between Germany and the Allies. He also led several rescue missions in Germany for the Red Cross. In April 1945, Heinrich Himmler asked Bernadotte to convey a peace proposal to Prime Minister Winston Churchill and President Harry S. Truman without the knowledge of Adolf Hitler. The main point of the proposal was that Germany would surrender only to the Western Allies (the United Kingdom and the United States), but would be allowed to continue resisting the Soviet Union. According to Bernadotte, he told Himmler that the proposal had no chance of acceptance, but nevertheless he passed it on to the Swedish government and the Western Allies. It had no lasting effect.

=== White Buses ===
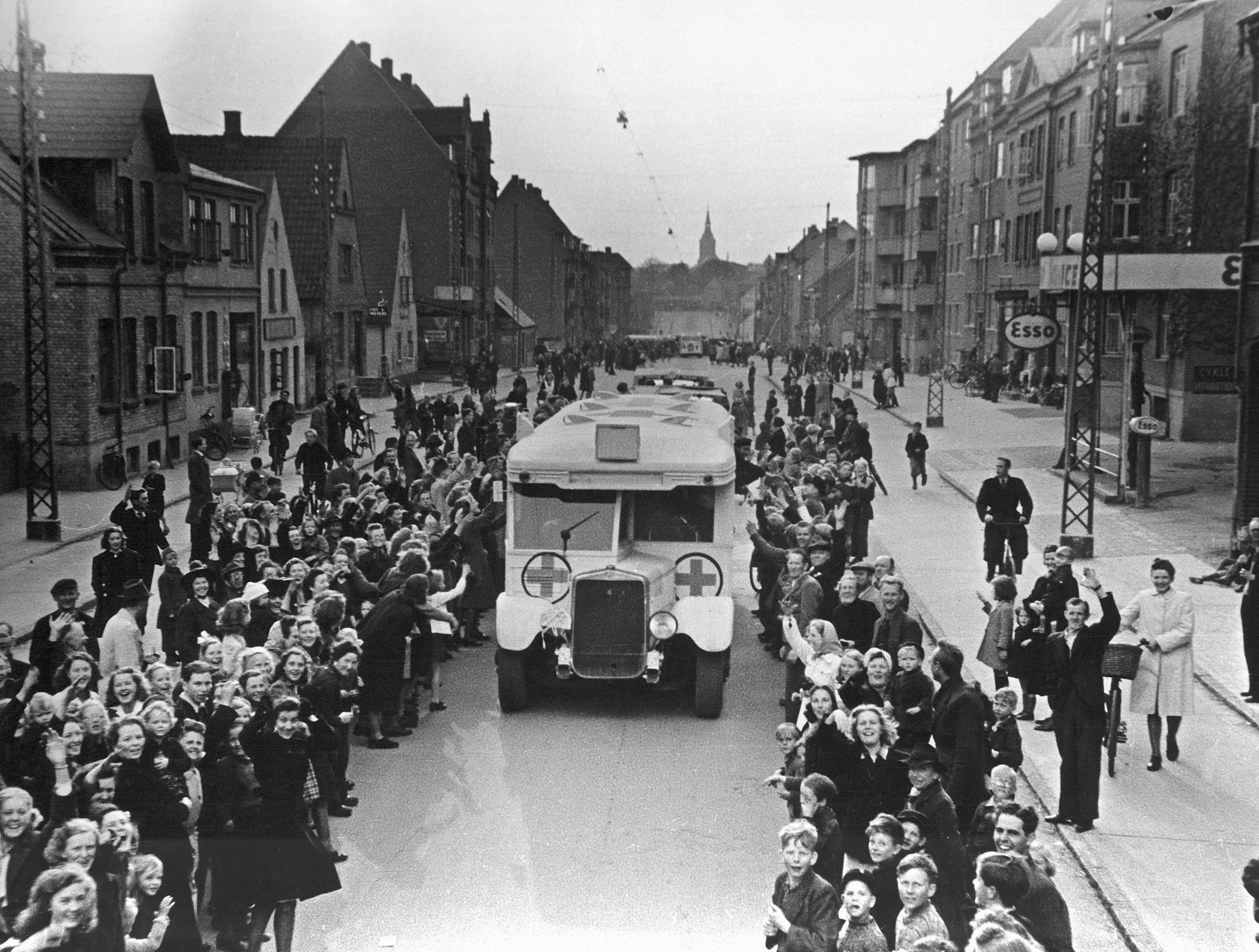
A White Bus passes through Odense, Denmark, 17 April 1945.

Upon the initiative of the Norwegian diplomat Niels Christian Ditleff in the final months of the war, Bernadotte acted as the negotiator for a rescue operation transporting interned Norwegians, Danes and other western European inmates from German concentration camps to hospitals in Sweden.

In the spring of 1945, Bernadotte was in Germany when he met Heinrich Himmler, who was briefly appointed commander of an entire German army following the assassination attempt on Hitler the year before. Bernadotte had originally been assigned to retrieve Norwegian and Danish POWs in Germany. He returned on 1 May 1945, the day after Hitler's death. Following an interview, the Swedish newspaper Svenska Dagbladet wrote that Bernadotte succeeded in rescuing 15,000 people from German concentration camps, including about 8,000 Danes and Norwegians and 7,000 women of French, Polish, Czech, British, American, Argentinian, and Chinese nationalities. The missions took around two months, and exposed the Swedish Red Cross staff to significant danger, both due to political difficulties and by taking them through areas under Allied bombing.

The mission became known for its buses, painted entirely white except for the Red Cross emblem on the side, so that they would not be mistaken for military targets. In total it included 308 personnel (about 20 medics and the rest volunteer soldiers), 36 hospital buses, 19 trucks, seven passenger cars, seven motorcycles, a tow truck, a field kitchen, and full supplies for the entire trip, including food and gasoline, none of which was permitted to be obtained in Germany. A count of 21,000 people rescued included 8,000 Danes and Norwegians, 5,911 Poles, 2,629 French, 1,615 Jews, and 1,124 Germans.

After Germany's surrender, the White Buses mission continued in May and June and about 10,000 additional liberated prisoners were thus evacuated.

Bernadotte recounted the White Buses mission in his book The End. My Humanitarian Negotiations in Germany in 1945 and Their Political Consequences, published on June 15, 1945, in Swedish.

==== Postwar controversy ====
Following the war, some controversies arose regarding Bernadotte's leadership of the White Buses expedition, some personal and some as to the mission itself. One aspect involved a long-standing feud between Bernadotte and Himmler's personal masseur, Felix Kersten, who had played a role in facilitating Bernadotte's access to Himmler, but whom Bernadotte resisted crediting after the war. The resulting feud between Bernadotte and Kersten came to public attention through British historian Hugh Trevor-Roper. In 1953, Trevor-Roper published an article based on an interview and documents originating with Kersten. The article stated that Bernadotte's role in the rescue operations was that of "transport officer, no more". Kersten was quoted as saying that, according to Himmler, Bernadotte was opposed to the rescue of Jews and understood "the necessity of our fight against World Jewry".

Shortly following the publication of his article, Trevor-Roper began to retreat from these charges. At the time of his article, Kersten had just been nominated by the Dutch government for the Nobel Peace Prize for thwarting a Nazi plan to deport the entire Dutch population, based primarily on Kersten's own claims to this effect. A later investigation by Dutch historian Louis de Jong concluded that no such plan had existed, however, and that Kersten's documents were partly fabricated. (Note: The original results were published by de Jong in 1972 and republished in a German translation in 1974.) Following these revelations and others, Trevor-Roper told journalist Barbara Amiel in 1995 that he was no longer certain about the allegations, and that Bernadotte may merely have been following his orders to rescue Danish and Norwegian prisoners. (Note: In 1956, for the introduction of Kersten's Memoirs (1956), Trevor-Roper wrote "although Bernadotte seems to have been understood by Himmler as using the language of anti-Semitism—which may have been a tactical necessity—there is no reason to suppose that his motive in refusing to take the Jews was anti-Semitic. Indeed the evidence points in the other direction, for Bernadotte also refused to take French and Polish prisoners. It seems that he genuinely misunderstood his instructions, thinking that he was only authorized to take Scandinavians. The fact that he could so misunderstand, and be so overruled, is evidence of the subordinate position which he occupied in these negotiations." The introduction was reprinted with minor changes in a 1957 Commentary magazine article. In 1995, Trevor-Roper clarified this earlier statement, quoted in a Barbara Amiel review of Kati Marton's book as saying, "I am not certain that Bernadotte refused to take Jews. I have some reservations about the documentation here. If he did, it may well have been that he simply had no instructions except in respect of Norwegians and Danes." Trevor-Roper earlier had made similar concessions.) Several other historians have also questioned Kersten's account, concluding that the accusations were based on a forgery or a distortion devised by Kersten.

Some controversy regarding the White Buses trip has also arisen in Scandinavia, particularly regarding the priority given to Scandinavian prisoners. Political scientist Sune Persson judged these doubts to be contradicted by the documentary evidence. He concluded, "The accusations against Count Bernadotte ... to the effect that he refused to save Jews from the concentration camps are obvious lies" and listed many prominent eyewitnesses who testified on Bernadotte's behalf, including the World Jewish Congress representative in Stockholm in 1945.

=== UN mediator ===
Folke Bernadotte in 1948

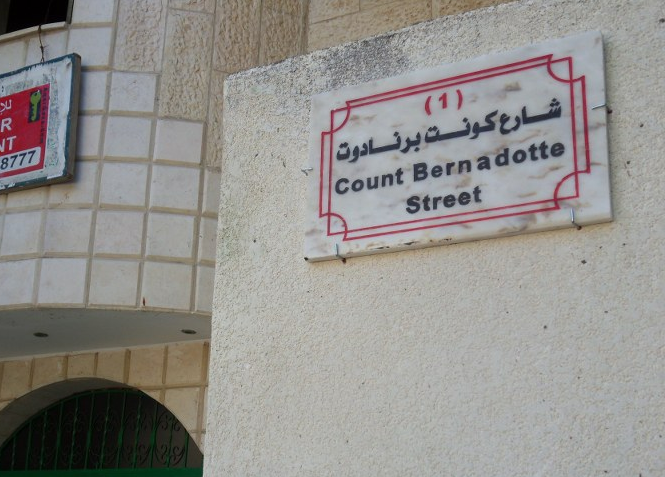
Count Bernadotte street sign in Gaza City, Gaza Strip

In 1948, Bernadotte played a central but brief role in the expanding Arab-Israeli conflict, a role which culminated in his assassination.

On November 29, 1947, the United Nations passed Resolution 181 for the Partition of Palestine, endorsing an independent Jewish state. Violence immediately broke out between Jewish and Arab fighters; this first phase of conflict, known as the 1947–1948 Civil War in Mandatory Palestine, lasted until May 14, 1948, when the Zionist leadership proclaimed the independent State of Israel and Britain began the termination of its 27-year control of Palestine. Arab nations bordering Israel immediately joined the battle on the Palestinian Arabs side, marking the commencement of the 1948 Arab–Israeli War. The United Nations Security Council demanded an immediate cease-fire, and the secretary general appointed Bernadotte as "United Nations Mediator in Palestine."

It was the first official mediation in the UN's history - Bernadotte's assignment was to effect a cease-fire between the Zionist and Arab forces and then seek a peaceful resolution by proposing partition plans. Bernadotte succeeded in achieving an initial truce, which went into effect on June 11 and lasted until July 8.

Achieving a satisfactory resolution to the conflict was significantly more difficult; Bernadotte wrote that "in putting forward any proposal for the solution of the Palestine problem, one must bear in mind the aspirations of the Jews, the political difficulties and differences of opinion of the Arab leaders, the strategic interests of Great Britain, the financial commitment of the United States and the Soviet Union, the outcome of the war, and finally the authority and prestige of the United Nations."

His final report, submitted to the United Nations in September, proposed that the Negev was to become Arab territory and the western Galilee, intended for the Arab state in the partition plan, would be included in the Jewish state. The disposition of the Arab part of Palestine was to be decided by the Arab states in consultation with the Palestinian Arabs, with a recommendation of a merger with Transjordan.

== Assassination ==
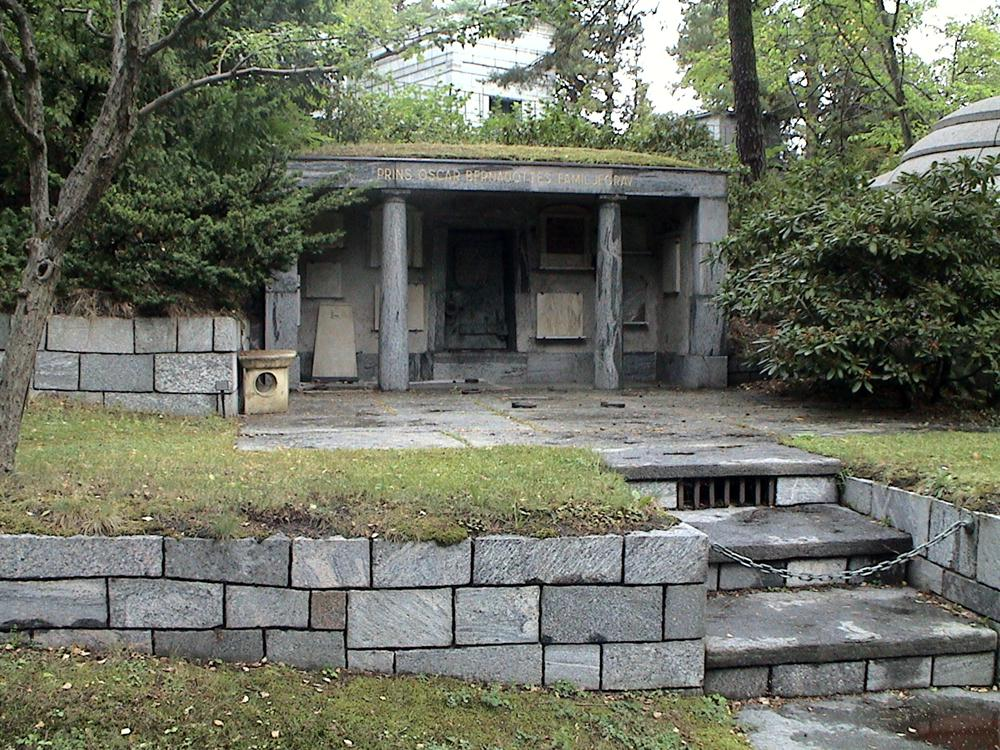
Prince Oscar Bernadotte's family tomb at the Northern Cemetery in Stockholm where the remains of Folke Bernadotte also are interred

On Friday 17 September 1948, four members of the Zionist paramilitary militant organization Lehi, sometimes referred to in the West as the Stern Gang, dressed in the uniforms of IDF soldiers and attacked Bernadotte's UN convoy as it drove through West Jerusalem, killing him as well as the French officer riding next to him, Colonel André Serot.

=== Planning and background ===
The Stern Gang saw Bernadotte as a puppet of the British and the Arabs and therefore a serious threat to the emerging State of Israel. Since a truce was in force, Lehi feared that the Israeli leadership would agree to Bernadotte's peace proposals, which it considered disastrous. The group was unaware the Israeli government had already decided to reject Bernadotte's plan.

The killing was approved by the three-man 'center' of Lehi: Yitzhak Yezernitsky (the future Prime Minister of Israel Yitzhak Shamir), Nathan Friedmann (also called Natan Yellin-Mor) and Yisrael Eldad (also known as Scheib). A fourth leader, Emmanuel Strassberg (Hanegbi) was also suspected by the Israeli Prime Minister David Ben-Gurion of being part of the group that ordered the assassination. The assassination was planned by Lehi's Jerusalem operations chief, Yehoshua Zettler.

=== The attack ===
In the Katamon quarter, we were held up by a Jewish Army type jeep placed in a road block and filled with men in Jewish Army uniforms. At the same moment, I saw an armed man coming from this jeep. I took little notice of this because I merely thought it was another checkpoint. However, he put a Tommy gun through the open window on my side of the car, and fired point blank at Count Bernadotte and Colonel Serot. I also heard shots fired from other points, and there was considerable confusion. [...]
Colonel Serot fell in the seat in back of me, and I saw at once that he was dead. Count Bernadotte bent forward, and I thought at the time he was trying to get cover. I asked him: 'Are you wounded?' He nodded, and fell back. [...]
When we arrived [at the Hadassah hospital] I carried the Count inside and laid him on the bed [...] I took off the Count's jacket and tore away his shirt and undervest. I saw that he was wounded around the heart and that there was also a considerable quantity of blood on his clothes about it.
When the doctor arrived, I asked if anything could be done, but he replied that it was too late.

— General Åge Lundström, who was in the UN vehicle

A four-man team, consisting of Yehoshua Cohen, Yitzhak Ben-Moshe (Markovitz), Avraham Steinberg, and Meshulam Makover, ambushed Bernadotte's motorcade in Jerusalem's Katamon neighborhood. The team left a Lehi base in a Jeep and set up a makeshift roadblock at Ben Zion Guini Square, off Hapalmach Street, and waited in the jeep. When Bernadotte's motorcade approached, Cohen, Ben-Moshe, and Steinberg got out and approached it, while Makover, the driver, remained in the jeep. Captain Moshe Hillman, the motorcade's Israeli liaison officer, who was sitting in the leading UN vehicle, called out in Hebrew to let them through, but was ignored.

Cohen came up to Bernadotte's sedan and fired through an open window, pumping six shots into Bernadotte's chest, throat and arms and 18 into Colonel André Serot who was seated to his left, killing both. Serot had swapped places in the motorcade to join Bernadotte - they had become friends after Bernadotte was instrumental in saving Serot's wife's life in a German concentration camp. Ben-Moshe and Steinberg shot at the tires of the UN vehicles, while Cohen finished the magazine by firing at the radiator. The driver of the sedan, Colonel Frank M. Begley, got out and tried to grapple with Cohen as he fired his last shots, but was burned in the face by the gun flashes. Ben-Moshe and Steinberg then rushed back and mounted the jeep, which quickly accelerated down a side road, while Cohen ran away from the scene across a roadside field.

All four members of the hit team made it to the religious community of Shaarei Pina, where they hid with local Haredi sympathizers. After a few days in hiding, they fled to Tel Aviv in the back of a furniture truck.

Following the shooting, Bernadotte's car sped to Hadassah Mount Scopus Hospital, despite damage to the radiator; the lead vehicle followed as its tires came apart. At the hospital, Bernadotte was pronounced dead. His body was moved to the YMCA, after which it was taken to Haifa and flown back to Sweden. Bernadotte was granted a state funeral, Abba Eban attended on behalf of Israel. Bernadotte was survived by a widow and two sons, a 12-year-old and a 17-year-old. He was buried in Prince Oscar Bernadotte's family tomb at the Northern Cemetery in Stockholm.

=== Investigation ===
The Israel Police, along with the military police and security services, investigated the assassination, but failed to identify any of the participants in the assassination, and the case was eventually closed without any of the participants having been identified. It has been suggested that the reasons for the failure of the investigation were poor coordination between these bodies, which resulted in information that may have assisted the police not being turned over to them, and the lack of proficiency among police officers and investigators in the early days of the Israel Police. The murder case was identified as 148/48 in Israeli police records.

Natan Yellin-Mor (center) and Matityahu Shmueliwitz in front of the Acre prison, after their release in 1949

Lehi leaders initially denied responsibility for the attack. Only later did Lehi take responsibility for the killings in the name of Hazit Hamoledet (the Homeland Front), a name they copied from a war-time Bulgarian resistance group. (Note: The text of the announcement was reprinted in 1988.)

In the wake of universal condemnation of the killing, Israeli Prime Minister David Ben-Gurion moved to shut down the Irgun and Lehi. While the underground organizations had by then mostly been integrated into the IDF, especially after the Altalena Affair, they had retained an independent presence in Jerusalem. With Bernadotte's assassination, the Israeli government lost its last remaining tolerance for them and passed the Ordinance to Prevent Terrorism. Lehi was declared a terrorist organization and many of its members were arrested. In addition, an ultimatum was issued to the Irgun to fully integrate into the IDF or be destroyed, and IDF troops surrounded the Irgun camp in Jerusalem. The Irgun accepted the ultimatum, and its fighters subsequently turned over their arms and enlisted in the IDF.

Yellin-Mor and another Lehi member, Mattityahu Shmulevitz, were charged with belonging to a terrorist organization. They were found guilty but immediately released and pardoned. Yellin-Mor had meanwhile been elected to the first Knesset. Betty Knut-Lazarus, a Lehi militant, and the granddaughter of composer Alexander Scriabin, was also imprisoned for being allegedly involved in the killing, before being subsequently released.

Years later, Cohen's role was uncovered by David Ben-Gurion's biographer Michael Bar Zohar, while Cohen was working as Ben-Gurion's personal bodyguard. The first public admission of Lehi's role in the killing was made on the anniversary of the assassination in 1977. The statute of limitations for the murder had expired in 1971. In 1988, two years after Cohen's death, Zettler and Makover publicly confessed their role in the assassination and confirmed that Cohen had killed Bernadotte. In the late 1960s, Israeli journalist Baruch Nadel published a book in which he also claimed to have taken part in planning the murder.

The weapon which was used in the assassination (an MP 40, serial number 2581) was lost, and was only found again in 2018 during an inventory check in the Heritage House of the Israel Police, when an unidentified box was found to contain an MP 40 machine pistol and the curator, Shlomi Shitrit, decided to identify the history of the weapon. Prior to finding it, it was believed to have been destroyed.

=== Aftermath ===
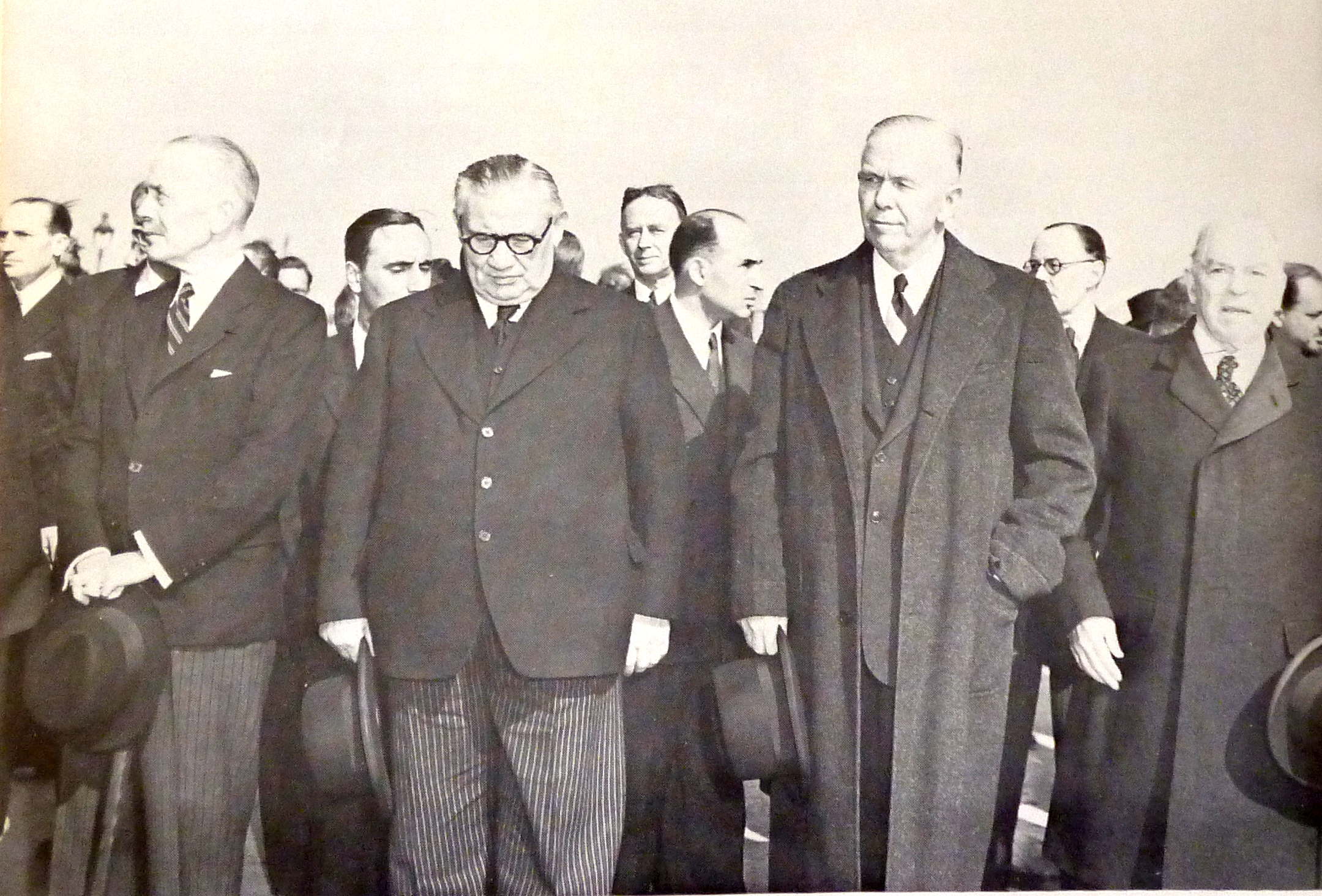
Folke Bernadotte's funeral: From left: Sir Alexander Cadogan, Ernest Bevin, George Marshall, William Lyon Mackenzie King

The day after the murders, by means of Security Council Resolution 57, the United Nations Security Council condemned the killing of Bernadotte as "a cowardly act which appears to have been committed by a criminal group of terrorists in Jerusalem while the United Nations representative was fulfilling his peace-seeking mission in the Holy Land."

The Swedish government believed that Bernadotte had been assassinated by Israeli government agents. They publicly attacked the inadequacy of the Israeli investigation, and campaigned unsuccessfully to delay Israel's admission to the United Nations. In 1950, Sweden recognized Israel, but relations remained frosty despite Israeli attempts to mollify Sweden, such as through the planting of a Bernadotte Forest by the Jewish National Fund in Israel. At a ceremony in Tel Aviv in May 1995, attended by the Swedish deputy prime minister, Israeli Foreign Minister and Labor Party member Shimon Peres issued a "condemnation of terror, thanks for the rescue of the Jews and regret that Bernadotte was murdered in a terrorist way", adding that "We hope this ceremony will help in healing the wound."

Ralph Bunche, Bernadotte's American deputy, succeeded him as UN mediator. Bunche was successful in bringing about the signing of the 1949 Armistice Agreements, for which he received the Nobel Peace Prize.

=== Awards and memorials ===
In 1998, Bernadotte was posthumously awarded one of the first three Dag Hammarskjöld Medals, given to UN peacekeepers who are killed in the line of duty.

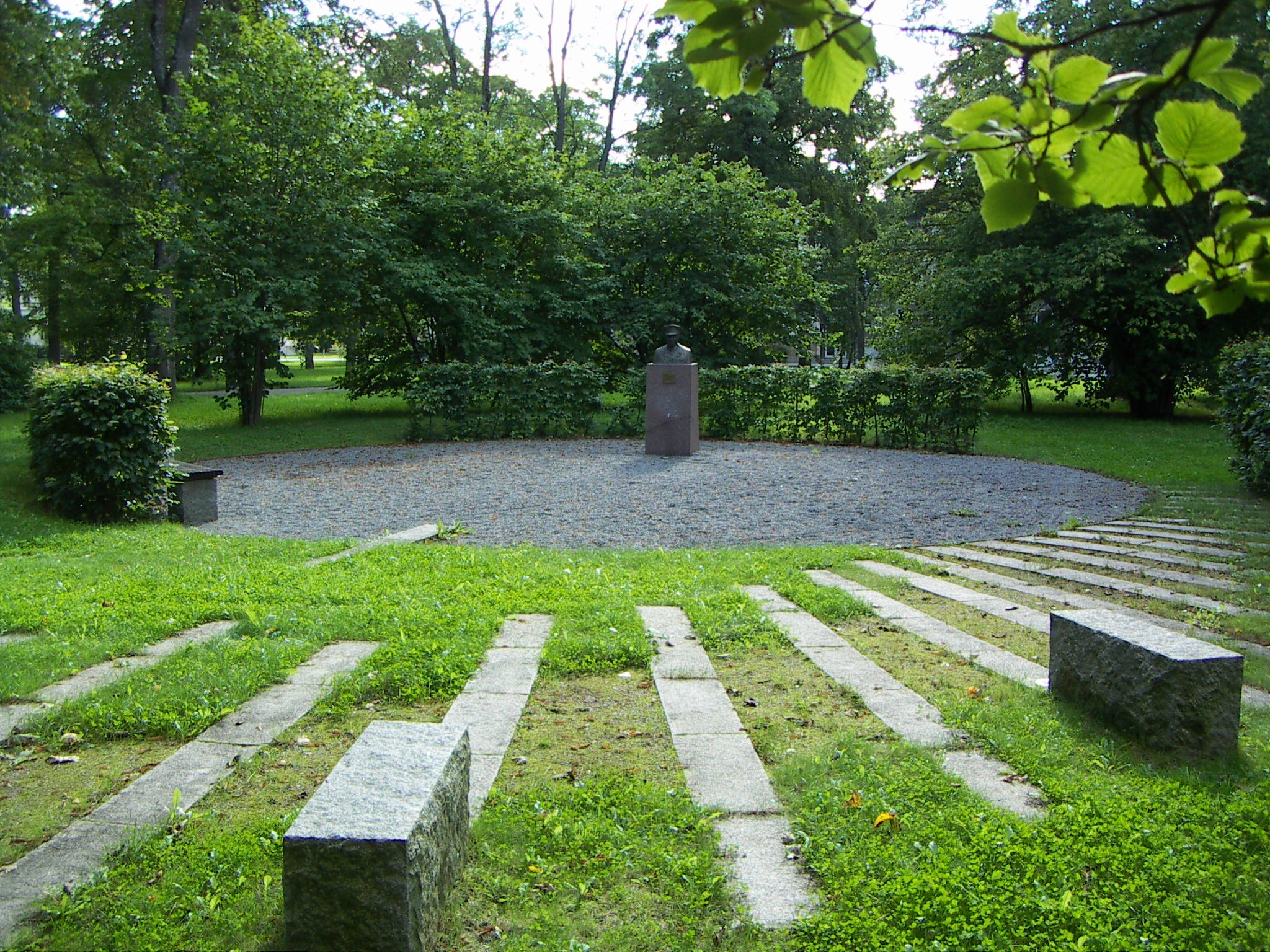
Folke Bernadotte Memorial in Uppsala, Sweden

The university library at Gustavus Adolphus College in St. Peter, Minnesota, US is named after him.

Count Benadotte Road, South Remal, Gaza is named after him.

The Yad Vashem Holocaust museum in Jerusalem features one of the "white buses" of Bernadotte's mission to Nazi Germany, which it recognises as rescuing 25,000 prisoners including several thousand Jews. However, Yad Vashem did not award him the "Righteous Among the Nations" title.

== Wife and children ==
In 1928 in Pleasantville, New York, Folke Bernadotte married Estelle Romaine Manville (1904–1984), whose family had founded part of the Johns-Manville Corporation. They had four sons, two of whom died in childhood.

- Count Gustaf Eduard Bernadotte of Wisborg (1930–1936)
- Count Folke Bernadotte of Wisborg (born 1931), married Christine Glahns
- Count Fredrik Oscar Bernadotte of Wisborg (1934–1944)
- Count Bertil Oscar Bernadotte of Wisborg (born 1935) married Rose-Marie Heering (1942–1967) and Jill Georgina Rhodes-Maddox

Seven grandchildren were all born after Folke Bernadotte's death. His widow Estelle Bernadotte remarried in 1973.

In September 2008, it became official that before his marriage Bernadotte had a daughter with actress Lillie Ericson-Udde (1892–1981):

- Jeanne Birgitta Sofia Kristina Matthiessen, née Ericson (1921–1991), who was adopted by Carl G. W. Matthiessen (1886–1951) when he married Lillie Ericson in 1925.

== Books ==
- Bernadotte, Folke (1945). The Curtain Falls. Translated by Count Eric Lewenhaupt. New York: A. A. Knopf. LCCN 45008956. (Swedish title: Slutet.)
- Bernadotte, Folke (1948). Instead of arms: autobiographical notes. Stockholm; New York: Bonniers. ISBN 978-1-125-28453-7.
- Bernadotte, Folke (1947). Människor jag mött [People I Met] (in Swedish). Stockholm: A. Bonniers.
- Bernadotte, Folke (1976) [1951]. To Jerusalem. Translated by Joan Bulman. Westport, Connecticut: Hyperion Press.

== See also ==
- Raoul Wallenberg
- Scandinavian theatre of World War II
