= Yehoshua Cohen =

Lehi militant and assassin (1922–1986)

- יהושע כהן
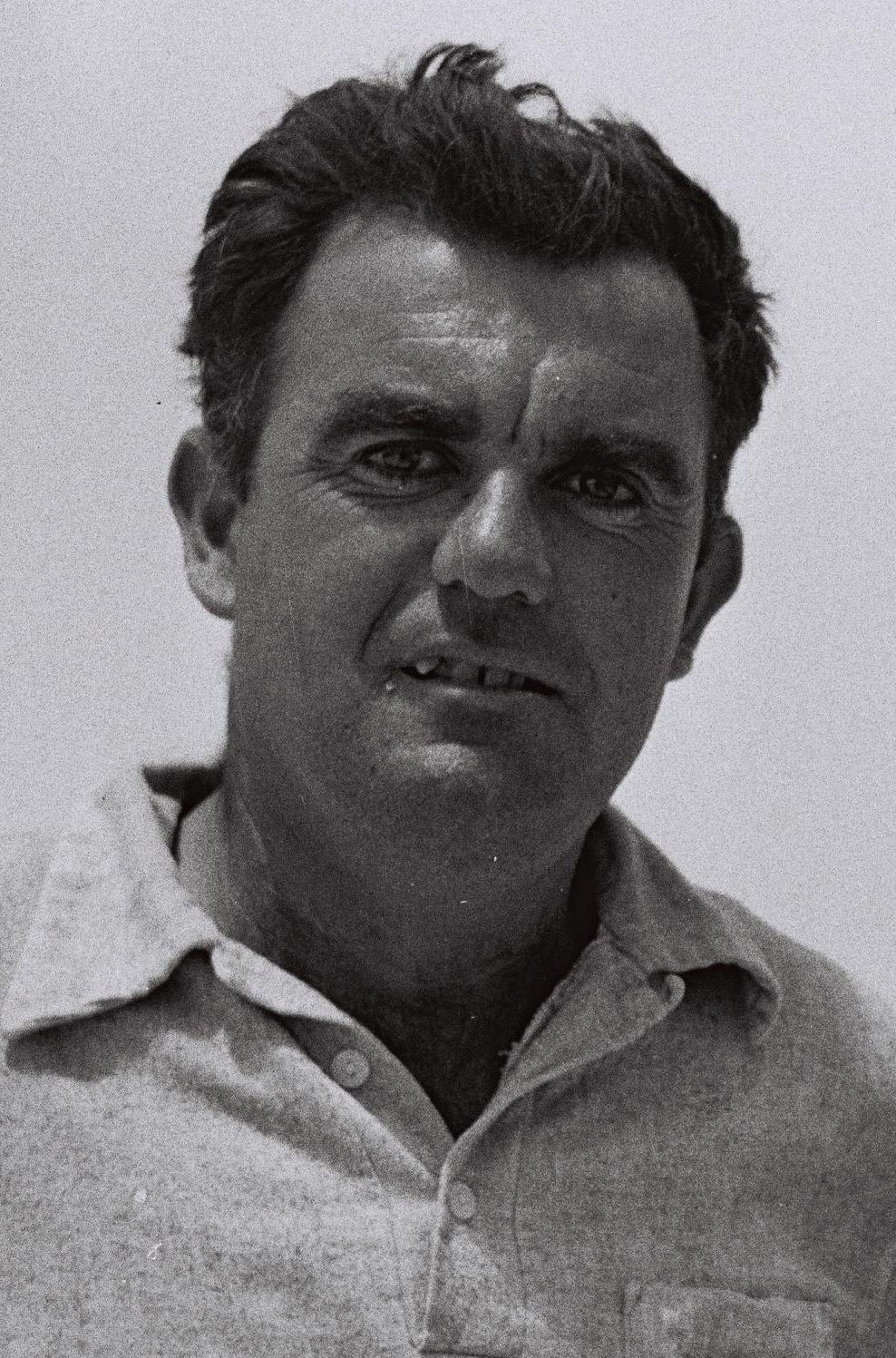
- Born: June 22, 1922; Petah Tikva, Mandatory Palestine (present-day Israel)
- Died: August 8, 1986 (aged 64); Sde Boker, Israel
- Military career
- Allegiance: Lehi; Israel Defense Forces

Yehoshua Cohen (Hebrew: יהושע כהן; June 22, 1922 – August 8, 1986) was a leading member of Lehi, a Zionist militant group, who assassinated United Nations envoys Folke Bernadotte and André Sérot on September 17, 1948. Cohen was never charged for his role in the assassination, and was one of the founders of the Sde Boker kibbutz in the Negev Desert, where David Ben-Gurion later lived. While Ben-Gurion lived at Sde Boker, he and Cohen became close friends.

== Early life and activity ==
Cohen was born in Petah Tikva in 1922, the son of a farmer. He was one of two sons born to Yaakov and Bluma Cohen. Cohen grew up in Kfar Saba. He joined the Lehi at age sixteen, and soon became a prominent fighter within the organization. In 1942, after the arrest of a number of Lehi members, Cohen was "among the few who remained at large and recruited a new generation" of members. During the period, Cohen escaped the authorities despite a $3,000 bounty on his head, and in addition to recruiting new members, he practiced his marksmanship, training for future missions.

In September 1942, Cohen helped Lehi leader Yitzhak Shamir escape from a British prison. Cohen smuggled two Polish Army uniforms to Shamir and another prisoner, Eliahu Gilaldi, who disguised themselves in the uniforms and then crawled under the barbed wire surrounding the prison. For his role in the escape, Cohen became recognized as "Lehi's most valued fighter".

After helping Shamir escape from prison, Cohen became a leader in Lehi. He trained members in the tactics of guerilla warfare, and taught them how to build bombs and land mines.

== Moyne assassination ==
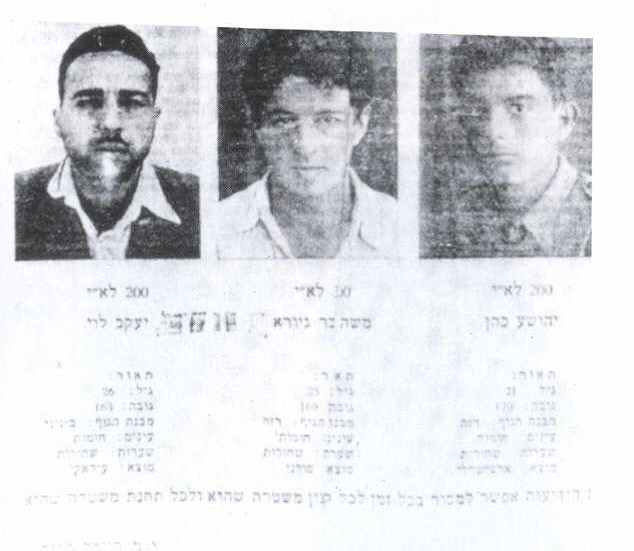
Cohen (right) on Wanted Poster of the Palestine Police Force offering rewards for the capture of Lehi members

In 1944, the leaders of Lehi decided to assassinate Lord Moyne, the British Minister of State for the Middle East. Yitzhak Shamir originally planned the assassination, and chose Eliyahu Bet-Zuri and Eliyahu Hakim to carry it out. Cohen was picked to train the two assassins for their mission, and traveled from Tel Aviv to spend several weeks training them in Jerusalem. After the assassination, Cohen became "a legend" within Lehi, and a reward was once again offered for his capture.

After the attack, Cohen was also involved in planning an attack on Harold MacMichael that failed. Shortly thereafter, Cohen was apprehended by the British and sent to a detention centre in Africa. On July 6, 1948, the British released Cohen, along with a large number of other detainees in response to Israel's independence.

== Assassination of Bernadotte ==
During the 1948 Arab–Israeli War, the United Nations mediator, Folke Bernadotte, advocated a plan under which major revisions in territorial holdings would be made in accordance with the November 1947 United Nations Partition Plan for Palestine, including placing Jerusalem under UN control. Many Israelis opposed these proposals and Lehi leaders decided that Bernadotte's assassination would be the most effective means to prevent their implementation. Lehi saw Bernadotte as a British and Arab puppet, and thus a serious threat to the emerging State of Israel, and feared that the provisional Israeli government would accept his plan, which it considered disastrous. The Lehi leadership approved the assassination, and Yehoshua Zeitler began to make plans for it. Cohen was chosen to lead the actual attack on Bernadotte and picked two other long-time members: Yitzhak Ben Moshe and Avraham Steinberg, to join him.

Cohen began training his team in West Jerusalem in August, practicing with the weapons and tactics they would use in the assassination. During the planning stage, Zetler and Cohen chose to ambush Bernadotte on a narrow road in the Katamon neighborhood, blocking his vehicle with a Jeep across the road and then attacking.

On September 17, 1948, Cohen and his team put their plan into action. As planned, they placed a Jeep across the road to stop Bernadotte's convoy at around 5:00 PM. Moshe and Steinberg then opened fire on the tires of Bernadotte's vehicle, while Cohen fired inside the car with a MP40 machine gun, killing Bernadotte and his aide, Andre Serot.

The day after the murders, the UN Security Council condemned the killing of Bernadotte as "a cowardly act which appears to have been committed by a criminal group of terrorists in Jerusalem while the United Nations representative was fulfilling his peace-seeking mission in the Holy Land."

The identity of the assassins remained unknown for some time, with various nations accusing each other of complicity until eventually it became clear that Lehi was responsible. Although Cohen's involvement was an open secret within Lehi and other groups, his role was not made public for over forty years.

At a ceremony in Tel Aviv in May 1995, attended by the Swedish deputy prime minister, Israeli Foreign Minister and Labor Party member Shimon Peres issued a "condemnation of terror" and stated that "Bernadotte was murdered in a terrorist way".

== Later life ==
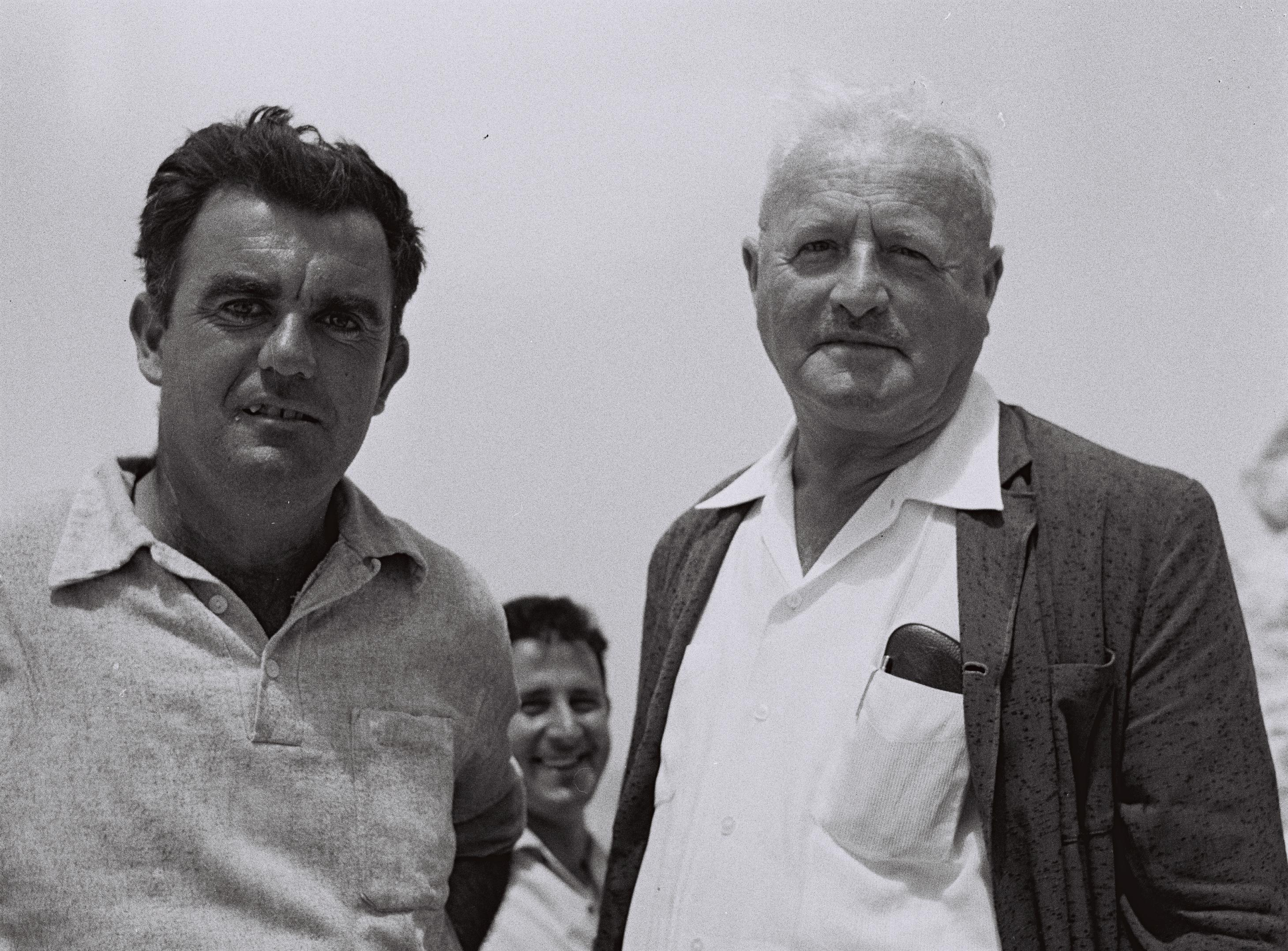
Yehoshua Cohen on the left, with David Tovyahu

After the assassination, Cohen was one of the founders of the Sde Boker kibbutz, established in 1952. The kibbutz later became home to David Ben-Gurion, the former Prime Minister of Israel, in 1956. At Sde Boker, Cohen became Ben-Gurion's unofficial bodyguard and confidant, and the two grew very close. According to a New York Times article from 1964, Cohen became Ben-Gurion's "closest companion." Cohen also served as the head of security at Sde Boker. Cohen was married and had two children, a son and daughter.

== Death and revelation of role ==
Cohen's involvement in the assassination of Bernadotte was long-rumored, but was not confirmed during his lifetime. Historian Michael Bar-Zohar claimed for a number of years that Cohen had privately confessed in his role in the attack to Ben-Gurion, but Cohen never responded to these claims publicly.

Cohen died at Sde Boker of a heart attack in 1986 at the age of 64, with his role in the attack still unclear, but in 1988 two of his co-conspirators in the attack, Yehoshua Zettler and Meshulam Markover, publicly confessed to their role in the attacks and confirmed that Cohen killed Bernadotte.
