= Braulio Sánchez Fuentes =

Most Reverend Braulio Sánchez Fuentes, S.D.B.
- Territorial Prelate of Mixes
- Church: Roman Catholic Church
- Appointed: 16 March 1966 (as Apostolic Administrator); 14 January 1970 (as Territorial Prelate)
- Retired: 16 December 2000
- Predecessor: New Creation
- Successor: Luis Felipe Gallardo Martín del Campo
- Other post(s): Titular Bishop of Aquae Novae in Proconsulari (1970–1978)

Orders
- Ordination: 28 October 1950 (Priest)
- Consecration: 1 May 1970 (Bishop) by Miguel Darío Miranda y Gómez

Personal details
- Born: Braulio Sánchez Fuentes; 4 August 1922; Mexico City, Mexico
- Died: 18 November 2003 (aged 81); Mexico

Braulio Sánchez Fuentes, S.D.B. (4 August 1922 – 18 November 2003) was a Mexican Roman Catholic prelate.

== Life ==
Sánchez Fuentes entered to religious congregation of the Salesians of Don Bosco and after his profession was ordained as priest on 28 October 1950.

Pope Paul VI appointed him on 16 March 1966 as the Apostolic Administrator and on 14 January 1970 as the first prelate of the newly created Roman Catholic Territorial Prelature of Mixes and Titular Bishop of Aquae Novae in Proconsulari. Archbishop of Mexico, Miguel Darío Miranda y Gómez, consecrated him on 1 May of the same year in the Cathedral of Sts. Peter and Paul in San Pedro y San Pablo Ayutla; co-consecrators were Archbishop Ernesto Corripio y Ahumada and Bishop José de Jesús Clemens Alba Palacios.

On 15 February 1978, Sánchez Fuentes renounced his titular bishop seat in the course of the new allocation guidelines of the Roman Curia. On 16 December 2000, Pope John Paul II accepted his retirement because of the age.

Sánchez Fuentes died at the age of 81.
