= Territorial Prelature of Mixes =

Latin Catholic jurisdiction in Mexico

Territorial Prelature of Mixes Praelatura Territorialis Mixepolitanus

Location
- Country: Mexico
- Ecclesiastical province: Antequera
- Population: 128,000

Information
- Denomination: Catholic Church
- Sui iuris church: Latin Church
- Rite: Roman Rite
- Established: December 21, 1964

Current leadership
- Pope: Leo XIV
- Prelate: Salvador Cleofás Munguia
- Bishops emeritus: Héctor Guerrero Córdova, S.D.B

Map
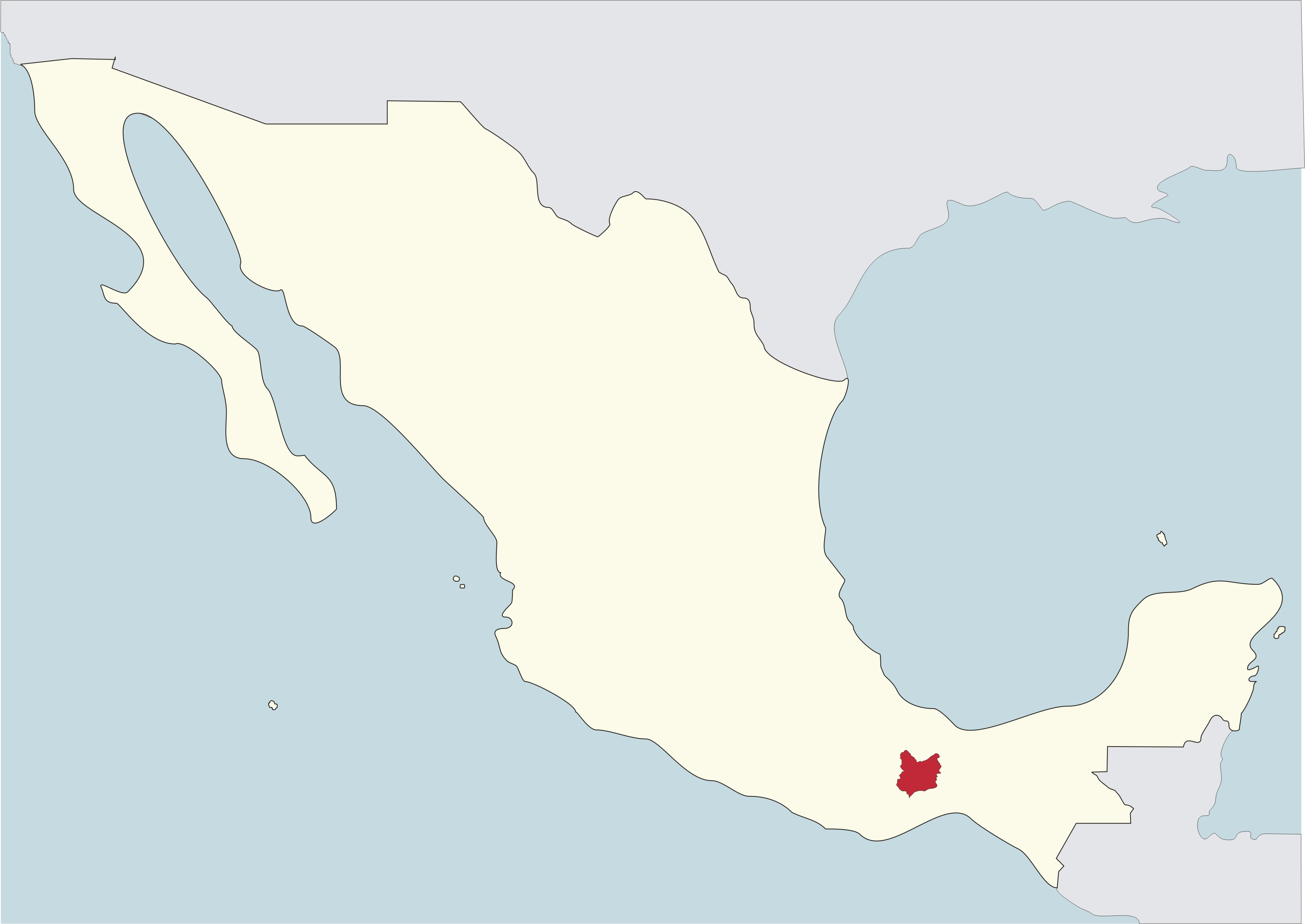

The Territorial Prelature of Mixes (Latin: Praelatura Territorialis Mixepolitanus) is a Latin Church missionary territory or territorial prelature of the Catholic Church in Mexico. It is a suffragan in the ecclesiastical province of the metropolitan Archdiocese of Antequera. The prelature is named for the city of San Juan Juquila Mixes and the Mixe people, with the episcopal see of Ayutla.

== History ==
The Territorial Prelature of Mixes was erected on 21 December 1964.

The present ordinary, Salvador Cleofás Murguía Villalobos, is a Salesian of Don Bosco from the Mexico-Guadalajara (MEG) province. After his term as provincial, he was appointed to the Central Department of Formation of the Salesians of Don Bosco, in Rome. In 2018 he was nominated to succeed Msgr. Héctor Guerrero Córdova as the bishop of the Mixes Prelature.

== Ordinaries ==
- Braulio Sánchez Fuentes, S.D.B. (1970 - 2000)
- Luis Felipe Gallardo Martín del Campo, S.D.B. (2000 - 2006), appointed Bishop of Veracruz
- Héctor Guerrero Córdova, S.D.B. (2007 - 2018)
- Salvador Cleofás Murguía S.D.B. (2018–Present)
