= Aquae Novae in Proconsulari =

Aquae Novae in Proconsulari is a former Ancient city and bishopric in Roman Africa and present Latin Catholic titular see.

Its modern location are the ruins of Sidi-Ali-Djebin, in present Tunisia.

== History ==
Aquae Novae was important enough in the Roman province of Africa Proconsularis to become one of the many suffragans of its capital Carthage's Metropolitan Archbishopric, but faded.

== Titular see ==
The diocese was nominally restored in 1933 as a titular bishopric.

It has had the following incumbents, all of the lowest (episcopal) rank :

- Jean-Marie-Clément Badré (1964.06.22 – 1969.12.10)
- Braulio Sánchez Fuentes, S.D.B. (1970.01.14 – 1978.02.15)
- Laurent Monsengwo Pasinya (1980.02.13 – 1988.09.01) (later Cardinal)
- Vilmos Dékány, Sch.P. (1988.12.23 – 2000.05.19)
- Louis-Marie Ling Mangkhanekhoun (2000.10.30 – ...), Apostolic Vicar of Pakse (Laos)

== See also ==
- Aquae in Proconsulari
- Aquae Novae in Numidia
- Catholic Church in Tunisia
