= Yehoshua Zettler =

Lehi commander and assassin (1917–2009)

- יהושע זטלר
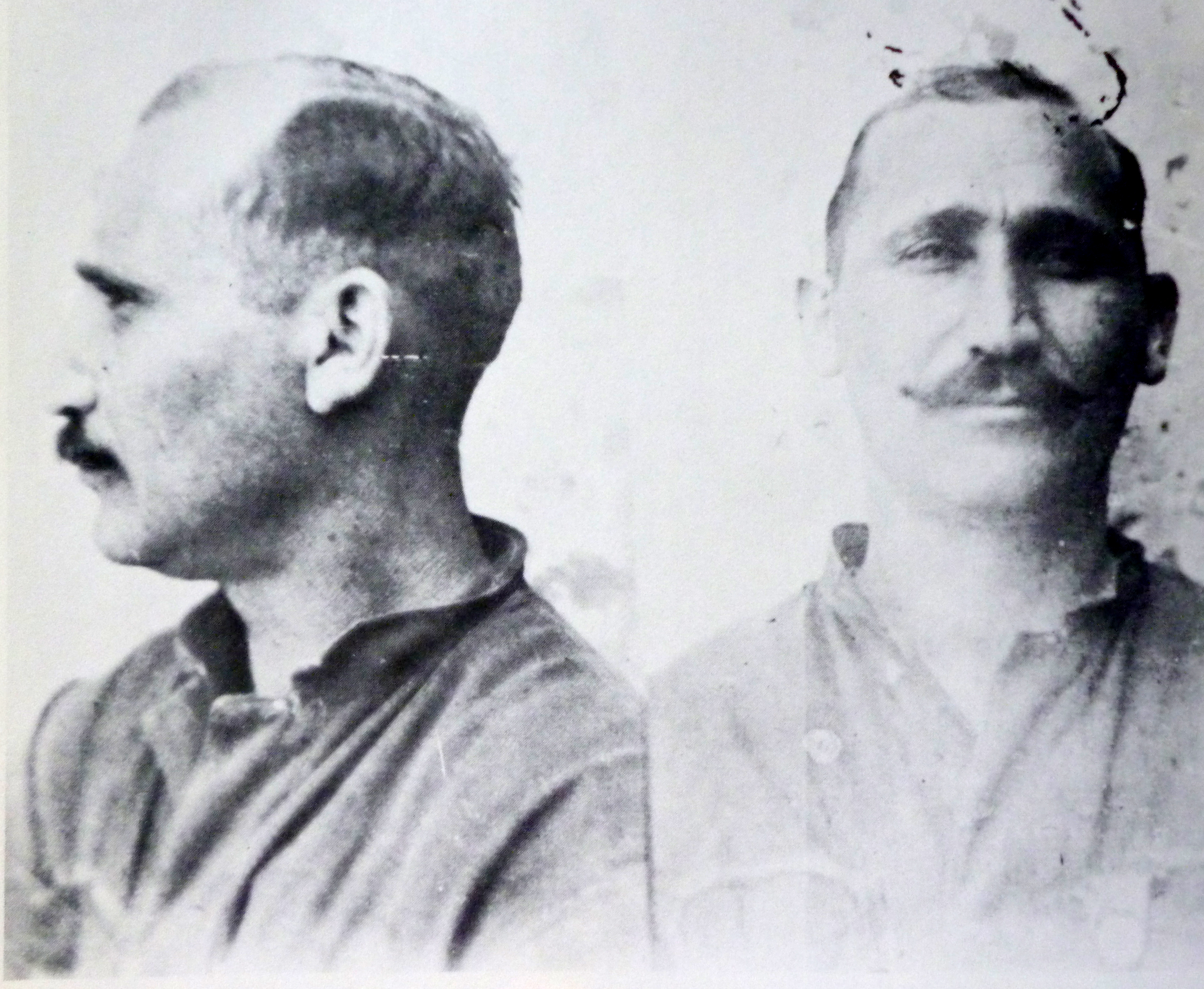
- Zettler in prison (1947)
- Born: July 15, 1917; Kfar Saba, Mutasarrifate of Jerusalem
- Died: May 20, 2009 (aged 91); Israel
- Military career
- Allegiance: Haganah (1931–1933); Irgun (1933–1940); Lehi (1940–1948)
- Service years: 1931–1948

Yehoshua Zettler (Hebrew: יהושע זטלר; July 15, 1917 – May 20, 2009; last name also spelled as Zeitler) was an Israeli man who served as the Jerusalem commander of the Jewish terrorist group Lehi, often called the Stern Gang. He conceived and planned the September 17, 1948, assassination of Swedish Count Folke Bernadotte, who was representing the United Nations Security Council as a mediator in the aftermath of the 1948 Arab–Israeli War.

== Biography ==
Zettler was born on July 15, 1917, in Kfar Saba, a Jewish settlement in what became the British Mandate of Palestine following World War I, and later part of Israel. The community — including Zettler's home — was largely destroyed in Arab riots in 1921, and the house was reconstructed after his family and other residents returned. He attended the Geula school in Tel Aviv.

=== Zionist underground ===
He joined the Haganah when he was 14 years old. In 1933, he joined the breakaway Haganah-Bet, which became the Irgun in 1937. Zettler was one of the organization's top commanders. He took part in the July 6, 1938 raid in which five Arabs were shot and killed in the village of Biyar 'Adas, the first organized attack in Mandatory Palestine by Jewish forces against an Arab village.

In June 1940, when the Irgun decided to suspend its underground military activities against the British during World War II, Zettler followed Avraham Stern and others who created Lehi (a Hebrew acronym for Lohamei Herut Yisrael, translated into English as Israel Freedom Fighters), which would follow a combative approach with the British authorities in Palestinian Mandate.

Zettler organized the robbery of a Tel Aviv bank in September 1940 and was subsequently arrested for the crime in May 1941. He then escaped from British detention and was chosen by the Lehi leadership to be its chief of operations. He eluded police for several weeks, until December 2, 1941, when he was re-arrested at his Tel Aviv apartment. Zettler was sentenced to 15 years in prison for robbery. After being involved in a riot at the Jerusalem Central Prison, Zettler was sent to Acre Prison.

On May 4, 1947, Zettler was freed in the Acre Prison break, a complex operation in which Irgun fighters blasted a hole in the wall of Acre Prison, while Jewish prisoners inside blasted the doors with smuggled explosives and escaped.

=== Deir Yassin massacre ===
During the 1948 war, Zettler participated in the Deir Yassin massacre, where Irgun and Lehi forces killed at least 107 Arab villagers, including women and children, spreading a wave of fear through other Arab communities in Palestine. The event was one of the most significant massacres during the war and contributed to the 1948 Palestinian expulsion and flight.

=== Assassination of Folke Bernadotte ===
Zettler was responsible for conceiving and planning the September 17, 1948, assassination of Swedish diplomat Count Folke Bernadotte, who represented the United Nations Security Council as a mediator in the aftermath of the 1948 Arab–Israeli War.

Bernadotte, in consultation with the United States and United Kingdom, advocated a plan under which major revisions in territorial holdings would be made in accordance with the November 1947 United Nations Partition Plan for Palestine, including placing Jerusalem under UN control. Many Israelis opposed these proposals and Lehi leaders decided that Bernadotte's assassination would be the most effective means to prevent their implementation.

The assassination plan was discussed in a September 10, 1948, meeting of Lehi leadership in a Tel Aviv apartment, which included Israel Eldad, Nathan Yellin-Mor and future-Prime Minister of Israel Yitzhak Shamir. Shamir later recounted that "The idea was conceived in Jerusalem by Lehi members. Our opinion was asked, and we offered no opposition." With no objections raised, Zettler came back to Jerusalem and selected the team that would carry out the attack on Bernadotte, which included Meshulam Makover and Yehoshua Cohen.

On September 17, 1948, Bernadotte came to Jerusalem in a car with General Åge Lundström on his way to meet Israeli official Dov Yosef, who was then the military governor of the Israeli-controlled portion of Jerusalem's New City. Bernadotte's car was stopped by an Israeli Army Jeep at a roadblock in the Katamon neighborhood. Cohen ran from the Jeep pointed a gun inside the car and shot at Bernadotte and the others in the back seat of the car at point-blank range, riddling him with bullets. Bernadotte had been hit six times, killing him almost instantaneously. The car was driven at full speed to Hadassah Hospital on Mount Scopus, but doctors there were unable to do anything for Bernadotte, who was bleeding profusely from his wounds. French Army Colonel André Serot, who had been sitting in the back seat next to Bernadotte, was also killed. The tires of the other vehicles in Bernadotte's convoy had been shot out, and the hit team fled to Shaarei Pina, where they were hidden by haredi supporters of Lehi, before moving on to Tel Aviv in a furniture truck.

Zettler acknowledged his role in directing the assassination in a 1988 interview with Israel Radio. In a 1988 interview with Dan Margalit, Zettler stated that the decision to go ahead with the assassination was made based on Bernadotte's proposals for separate Jewish and Arab states in what had been the Palestinian Mandate. He did not regret his actions, stating that "When we demonstrated in front of [Bernadotte] and told him 'Go away from our Jerusalem, go back to Stockholm', he did not respond. So we had no choice."

After the killing, then-Prime Minister of Israel David Ben-Gurion banned Lehi as "a gang of rogues, cowards and low schemers" and had its members arrested, though, they were released immediately.

=== Personal life ===
He was married in 1948 to Bella Shechter, a member of Lehi. Their marriage was conducted on a Jerusalem rooftop in the presence of armed guards. Together they had two daughters: Ariella and Ephrat.

Zettler remained on Israel's political right wing, retaining a long-held suspicion of Arabs and foreigners in Israel, and believed that Israel should retain territories occupied during the Six-Day War. In his later years, he lived in Tel Aviv and ran a gas station in Jaffa.

Zettler died at age 91 on May 20, 2009.
