= Jean Badré =

French Catholic bishop (1913–2001)

Jean-Marie-Clément Badré
- Diocese of Bayeux
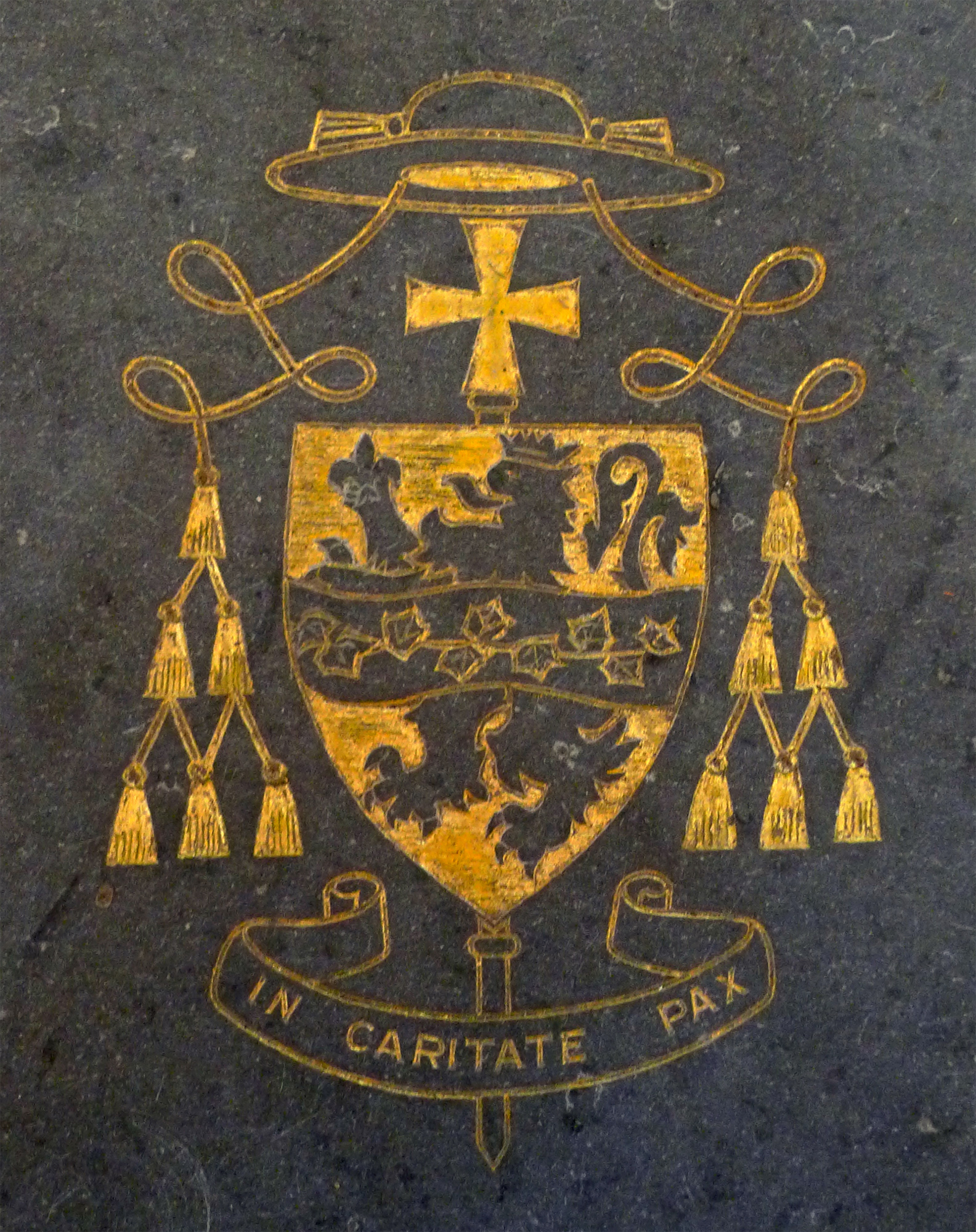
- Ledger stone depicting the coat of arms of Jean Badré, in the Bayeux Cathedral
- Church: Catholic Church
- Diocese: Diocese of Bayeux
- In office: 10 December 1969 – 19 November 1988
- Predecessor: André Jacquemin
- Successor: Pierre Pican
- Previous posts: Military Vicar of the Ordinariate of France (1967-1969); Titular Bishop of Aquae Novae in Proconsulari (1964-1969); Auxiliary Bishop of Paris (1964-1967)

Orders
- Ordination: 24 December 1939 by Jean Verdier
- Consecration: 3 September 1964 by Maurice Feltin

Personal details
- Born: 17 October 1913 Arbois, Jura, France
- Died: 17 September 2001 (aged 87) Paris, France

Jean-Marie-Clément Badré (17 October 1913 – 17 September 2001) was a French Catholic bishop of the twentieth century. Badré was born on 17 October 1913 in Arbois, to Louis Badré, Inspector General of Water and Forests, and Mrs. Claire Maire and educated at Etudes: Lycée de Colmar, He was schooled at École Massillon, Lycée Saint-Louis and Séminaire de Saint-Sulpice in Paris.

On 23 December 1939, he was ordained as a deacon and then made a priest the next day (Christmas Eve 1939), shortly prior to the Nazi occupation of France. He asked for exceptional permission to be ordained a priest by Cardinal Verdier. During the war he and his brother Paul Badré worked with the resistance. At this time he was Vicar at the parish of Saint-Antoine de Padoue and assistant chaplain of the Janson-de-Sailly high school in Paris.

After the war he was made Chaplain of the 1st military region (1945), Director of the Catholic military chaplaincy (1946), Catholic chaplain of the French armies, Auxiliary of His Eminence Cardinal Feltin (Archbishop of Paris) (1964), Director of the Vicariate for the Armed Forces (1964) then Vicar for the French Armies (1967),

In 1963, he was made Auxiliary Bishop of Paris, France and Titular Bishop of Novae in Proconsular. He welcomed Pope John Paul II to the Basilica of Saint Therese of Lisieux during his apostolic visit to France in 1980. On 19 November 1988, then aged 75, he retired as Bishop of Bayeux (-Lisieux). On 17 September 2001, Badré died at the age of 87. He was buried in the Bayeux Cathedral.

== Decoration ==
- Officer of the Legion of Honor,
- Croix de guerre 39-45,
- Medal of the Resistance,
- Commander of the Academic Palms.
- Medal of the Health Service,
- Canon of Honor of the Diocese of Paris,
- Prelate of His Holiness.
