= Paul Paillole =

Former French secret service chief Paul Paillole was born in the Breton town of Rennes on 18 November 1905. He died on 15 October, 2002 in the Bichat hospital in Paris. He is remembered essentially for his role, which was the foundation for the arrest of German intelligence agents in France after the defeat of 1940 Head of counter-espionage for the Armistice Army, he joined the Allies after the invasion of the Free Zone. Appointed director of military security in Algiers by General Giraud, he was privy to the preparations for the Normandy and Provence landings by General Eisenhower's headquarters.

== Background ==
Paillole’s early life see particularly: Paul Paillole, L’homme des services secrets : Entretiens avec Alain-Gilles Minella, Paris, Éditions Julliard, 1995. A ward of the nation, Paillole attended secondary school at the Lycée Thiers in Marseille, Saint-Charles annex[1], before enlisting on October 1, 1925. A graduate of the Saint-Cyr military academy (class of "Morocco and Syria" - 1925-1927), he was assigned as a second lieutenant to the 17th Algerian Tirailleurs Regiment in October 1927, then to the 21st Algerian Tirailleurs Regiment on January 1, 1929. Promoted to lieutenant on October 1, 1929, he was admitted to the Gendarmerie Officers' School in Versailles on October 7, 1930, before being assigned as a trainee to the 7th Chasseurs Regiment on April 1, 1931.

== Military career ==
Guided by both his sense of patriotism and his love of physical activity Paillole joined the French army in 1925 and was promoted to Lieutenant in 1929. In 1935, Paillole was transferred to the Secret Services. He was initially reluctant to accept this posting as he considered the job too desk-bound and started with very limited knowledge of the workings of the Secret Services. But rapidly he excelled at the job, earning a reputation for professional competence. At the outbreak of the war Paillole was a prominent member of the active counter-espionage branch, the 5th Bureau (not to be confused with the 2nd Bureau which was the more administrative branch of secret service activity). On November 21, 1935, Paillole joined the central administration of the Ministry of War and obtained the rank of captain on June 25, 1936. He was then assigned to the 2nd Bureau, service SR-SCR (SR: Intelligence Service, SCR: Centralized Intelligence and Counter-Espionage Service), headed by Colonel Rivet.

He was in charge of the German section, succeeding Commandant de Robien, under the command of Lieutenant Colonel Guy Schlesser. As early as 1937, Schlesser and Paillole reorganized counter-espionage on the eve of the war: Ministerial Directive 1800 defined the responsibilities in matters of counter-espionage, established an intelligence centralization office in each military region, and organized preventive counter-espionage for the army. These were the first measures to protect military secrets. The protection effort also extended to the judicial sphere.

On October 3, 1939, he was transferred to the 5th Bureau of the Army General Staff.

== Wartime activity ==
After France was rapidly defeated in 1940, the newly established Vichy regime decided to reorganize its espionage and counter-espionage services. Paillole took control of a clandestine counter-espionage network which operated from Marseille under the codename ‘Travaux Ruraux’ (TR- ‘Rural Works’). Although Vichy itself was collaborating extensively with the German forces occupying Northern France, Vichy leaders were keen to preserve their autonomy and to centralize collaboration. The work of Paillole’s services served to defend sovereignty and to prevent unauthorised individual acts of collaboration on the part of ordinary French citizens.

Kitson has estimated that around 2000 individuals were arrested by the collaborating French State on charges of spying for Vichy’s diplomatic partner: Germany. On October 3, 1939, he was assigned to the 5th Bureau of the Army General Staff.

On July 21, 1940, Paillole was placed on administrative leave following the armistice. However, on June 24, 1940, near Agen, in the courtyard of the Bon-Encontre seminary, Colonel Rivet, Captain Paillole, and the counter-espionage officers swore an oath to continue the fight against enemy special services clandestinely. They received support from General Weygand to establish the structures adapted to this fight[2]:

Rural Works (with the support of the rural engineering corps), a cover for offensive clandestine counter-espionage, under the direction of Paul Paillole, alias Mr. Perrier (Philippe Perrier);

The Bureau of Anti-National Activities (BMA), recognized by the armistice agreement, was supposed to ensure the army's protection. In each military region of the unoccupied zone, the official MA office concealed two clandestine posts: the SR post and the TR post.

The War SR, headed by Lieutenant Colonel Perruche, was based in Royat.

The clandestine Air SR was under the command of Colonel Georges Ronin. From autumn 1940 to August 1942, Paillole ran a service from Marseille to combat enemy intelligence and "foreign agents," nicknamed "La Centrale" or "Cambronne" [3].

In the northern zone, Paillole's services gathered intelligence against the occupying forces, leading them to cooperate with certain resistance groups. In the southern zone, these same services hunted down Axis spies, but also "dissidents," presented as "English" or "Gaullist" agents. After the war, Paillole cited his embryonic military networks in the occupied zone as precursors to the Resistance and claimed to have protected the birth of certain movements: he said he only arrested compromised agents in the southern zone.[4] He also allegedly covered the escape of Resistance fighters (such as Roger Wybot, whose escape was supposedly facilitated by Robert Blémant under Paillole's authority) and men of the Intelligence Service.[5]

Since his time at Saint-Cyr, Paillole had been a friend of Henri Frenay. In the unoccupied zone, Maurice Chevance maintained a theoretical link between the TR (Tactical Resistance) and the National Liberation Movement. In the occupied zone, officers of Paillole and Ronin subsidized Les Petites Ailes de France, Combat Zone Nord, and the Hector network. In their postwar presentation of this attitude secret service veterans have always presented themselves as firmly in the Allied camp and engaged from the outset in Resistance. In August 1942, after the dissolution of the BMA under pressure from the German authorities, Paillole took over the Military Security Service (SSM), created by Colonel Rivet. In November 1942, the Germans invaded the unoccupied zone. Paillole, wanted by the Germans, escaped through Spain, reached London, where he met Colonel Passy, head of the BCRA (Central Bureau of Intelligence and Action), and then Algiers in January 1943. On March 1, 1943, following the departure of Lieutenant Colonel Chrétien, who had been in charge of counter-espionage in North Africa since March 1941, Paillole dissolved the service and maintained a single directorate for France and the Empire.[15] He then held positions within the special services of General Henri Giraud. From Algiers, he directed the operations of Marcel Taillandier, head of the Morhange network, the armed wing of counter-espionage in Toulouse. Paillole then organized the transport of agents and equipment aboard submarines between North Africa and Ramatuelle (Var).

As Director of Military Security based in Algiers, Paillole retained control over the TR, adapted the structures of his service, and participated in operations carried out by the French and Allied Forces until the liberation of France: campaigns in Tunisia, Italy and Corsica, participation in disinformation operations prior to the landing, notably Operation Force A and Operation Fortitude, which aimed to deceive the enemy about all Allied landing plans in Europe. Paul Paillole was the first French officer involved, under a veil of secrecy, in the preparations for the Normandy landings. On April 15, 1944, SHAEF (Supreme Quarterly Allied Expeditionary Force), the headquarters of the Allied forces in Northwest Europe commanded by General Dwight Eisenhower, requested that the president of the French Committee of National Liberation (CFLN), commander-in-chief of the armed forces, secure the participation of Paul Paillole and the SSM (Security Service Military) in security and counter-espionage missions in the territories to be liberated.

Paul Paillole left for London on May 7, 1944. There he met with the heads of the SHAEF offices, General Bedell Smith and Colonel Menzies of the IS (Intelligence Service), and was sworn to secrecy regarding the date of the landings.[17] He established agreements with Colonel Scheen, head of the 2nd Bureau of SHAEF, defining the respective responsibilities of the Allied and French security services after the landings. In particular, responsibility for counter-espionage activities was assigned to the French military authority (SSM), SHAEF liaison counter-espionage officers were attached to military security offices, and SM TR detachments were assigned to major Allied units.[18]

These agreements helped prevent France from becoming a territory administered by AMGOT, the Allied military government.

Returning to France, Paillole left active service in November 1944 with the rank of lieutenant colonel.

== Postwar career ==
In 1953, Paillole founded, with his comrades, the Association of Former Members of the Special Services of National Defense (AASSDN). On September 30, 1955, he was promoted to the rank of colonel.

Paillole then held important positions in industry and served several terms as mayor of his town, La Queue-les-Yvelines. He also managed the theater of Marie Bell, a former Honorary Correspondent of the Service. Through Minister Edmond Michelet, he obtained the first status for intermittent workers in the performing arts. [citation needed]

In 1975, Paillole's memoirs, Special Services 1935-1945, received the Grand Prix Vérité. Some resistance fighters who were victims of the BMA repression, such as Toussaint Raffini, protested against the lack of rigor in this hagiographic portrayal of the Vichy special services.

Through his books (Special Services 1935-1945, Our Spy at Hitler's, The Man from the Secret Services) and the creation of the AASSDN (Association for the Study of the History of the French National Defense), Paul Paillole helped to explain the historical actions of the special services between 1935 and 1945, to preserve the memory of its agents who died for France, and to pay tribute to their work.

The AASSDN archives can be consulted at the French Defense Historical Service (Fort de Vincennes), as can the archives of French counter-espionage seized by the Germans and returned by Russia, the "Moscow Collection."
