= André Serot =

French military officer (1896–1948)

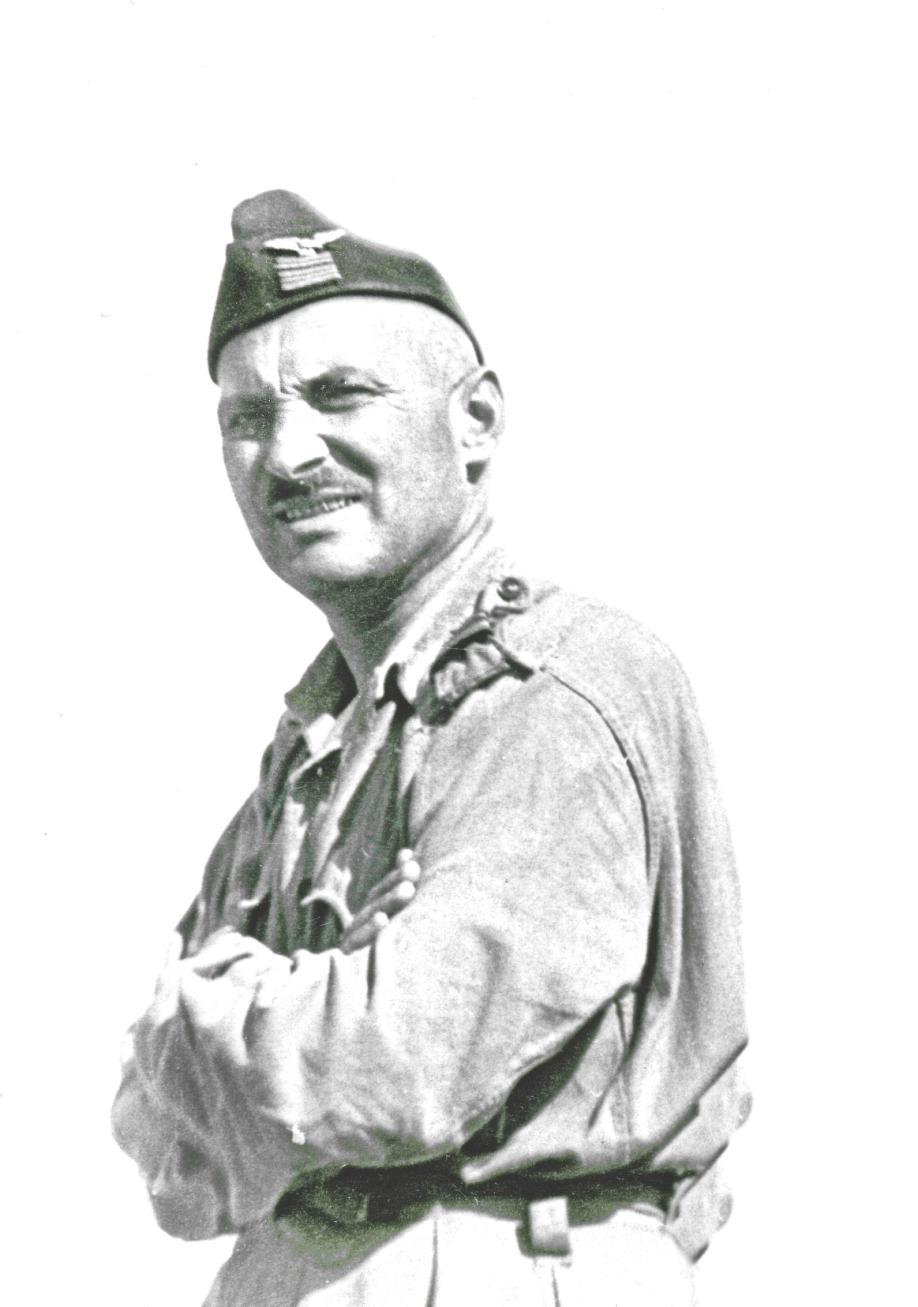
- Born: 24 July 1896; Xertigny, Vosges, France
- Died: 17 September 1948 (aged 52) Jerusalem, Israel
- Cause of death: Assassination
- Allegiance: France
- Branch: French Army (1915–1917); French Air Force (1917–1948)
- Service years: 1915–1948
- Rank: Colonel
- Conflicts: World War I; Meuse–Argonne offensive; World War II; Phoney War
- Awards: Croix de Guerre

André Sérot (24 July 1896 in Xertigny, France – 17 September 1948 in Jerusalem) was a French military officer.

Sérot enlisted in the infantry in 1915, then saw action in the Battle of Argonne and received the Croix de Guerre. The following year, he was an officer candidate at Saint-Cyr. In 1917 he transferred to aviation, flying reconnaissance missions.

In 1919, Lieutenant Sérot transferred to the intelligence service. In 1923 he was sent to Strasbourg. In 1933, he became deputy chief of station Belfort, or Military Communications Service (MCS).

He married Berthe Grünfelder (1898–1971).

During the "Phoney War" period (1939–1940), Sérot was sent behind German lines with a series of false identity papers to perform reconnaissance missions. After the 1940 defeat, he helped organize the counter-espionage section of the Service de Renseignements de l'Armée de l'Air ("Air Forces Intelligence Service") newly created by Colonel Georges Ronin. After the Allied landings in North Africa in November 1942, he and Paul Paillole went there to organize the new Service de Sécurité Militaire ("Military Intelligence Service").

On June 23, 1943, his wife was arrested by the Gestapo in Clermont-Ferrand and was deported to Ravensbruck in Germany. In 1945, she was rescued and released by Count Folke Bernadotte. This led to a friendship between the two men.

In 1944, Captain Sérot headed the SSM.

== Death ==
Sérot, now a Colonel in the Armee de l'Air, was serving with UN forces in Palestine in 1948, where he commanded a detachment of French peacekeepers. On September 17, 1948, he was traveling by car in Jerusalem, accompanying Bernadotte, now the United Nations Mediator for Palestine. Both were unarmed, as were their bodyguards and Israeli Army liaisons, as Bernadotte wanted to project a peaceful, non-combative image.

Their vehicle was ambushed by members of Lehi (also known as the Stern Gang), who were wearing Israeli army uniforms, intent on assassinating Bernadotte. Both Bernadotte and Sérot were killed. The killers were never arrested, but the murders led to the discrediting and disbandment of Lehi.

After his death, the Israeli government paid reparations to the United Nations in order to pay $25,000 to Serot's widow and $233 for his funeral as well as $575 to Serot's father on behalf of the UN.

== Commando Colonel Sérot (Indochina War) ==
Capitaine Albert-Charles Meyer, an Armee de l'Air Fusilier-Commando officer, arrived in Indochina in 1951. He set up an intelligence and counter-sabotage unit to defend the airbases of Bien Hoa and Tan Son Nhut. He used native auxiliaries led by Fusilier-Commandos to patrol the area of operations near the base to prevent sabotage to the planes or raids on the airfields. It also handled informants, infiltrators, and Viet-Minh turncoats who gave information on Viet Minh operations.

The unit, Brigade de Recherches et de Contra-Sabotage (BRCS) ("Intelligence & Counter-Sabotage Brigade") was dubbed the Commando Colonel Sérot in the slain Colonel's honor. Meyer's father had been Sérot's friend and Sérot mentored Meyer when they worked together in the Resistance.
