= Ceux de la Libération =

French resistance movement

Ceux de la Libération (French pronunciation: [sø də la libeʁasjɔ̃], lit. 'Those of the Liberation'; CDLL) was a French resistance movement during the German occupation of France in World War II.

CDLL was one of the eight major resistance groups of the Conseil National de la Résistance (CNR).

== History ==
Ceux de la Libération was formed in November 1940 by Maurice Ripoche, Henri Pascal and Jacques Ballet. The movement soon had several thousand members in the Northern occupation zone; by the end of the war the group reported that more than 250 of its members were dead or missing.

In early 1942, Roger Coquoin, a demobilized Captain and the head of the Chemistry Laboratory at the Académie Nationale de Médecine, met with the CDLL leader Maurice Ripoche. He became involved with the group and succeeded Ripoche as leader after the latter's arrest in March 1943. Under Coquoin's command, the CDLL expanded to Paris and the rest of France, gathering new volunteers in Normandy, Champagne, Bourgogne and Vendée. Coquoin also made contact with other resistance movements in the occupied zone and even in the southern zone of Vichy. His capabilities in chemistry enabled him to develop detonators and abrasive pellets for destroying German trucks. After Coquoin was killed in an ambush in December 1943, Gilbert Védy, CDLL's delegate to the Provisional Consultative Assembly in Algiers, returned to Paris to head the movement. However, three days after his arrival, on 21 March 1944, Védy was arrested and poisoned himself during the interrogation rather than risk divulging any information.

The group published a self-titled newspaper from May 1943; it became La France libre in April 1944 and merged with L'aurore in 1948.

== Members ==
•Pierre Audemard (xxxx–xxxx/Place of death: KZ Mauthausen)

•Jacques Ballet (1908–2000)

•Christophe Beaulieu

•Pierre Beuchon

•Jean Bessemoulin

•Josephine Bouffort

•Fernand Boivent

•Joseph Brindeau (xxxx–1942/Place of death: Augsburg hospital)

•Albert Chodet

•Roger Coquoin-Lenormand (1897–1943)

•Raymond Deleule (1902–1961)

•Eugene Dumaine (1901–1943/Place of death: KZ Buchenwald)

•Victor Dupont (1909–1976)

•Albert Forcinal (1887–1976)

•Paul Fremond

•Jules Fremont (xxxx–1943/Place of death: Munich / "München-Stadelheim")

•Jacques Froment (1920–1944)

•Andree Gallais (1898–1997)

•Huguette Gallais (1921–2016)

•René Gallais (1892–1943/Place of death: Munich / "München-Stadelheim")

•Benjamin Garnier

•Pere (Abt) Pierre Gillet (1904–1985)

•Émile Ginas (1892–1975)

•Aymé Guerrin (1890–1979)

•Edmond Herbert

•Georges Huet

•Pierre Jeanpierre (1912–1958)

•Teophile Jagu

•Pierre Konstante

•Marcel Lebastard

•François Lebosse (xxxx–1943/Place of death: Munich / "München-Stadelheim")

•René Leduc (1901–1983)

•Jean Le Ravallec

•Francis Loizance

•Raymond Loizance (xxxx–1943/Place of death: Munich / "München-Stadelheim")

•Emile Louvel

•Joseph Louvel

•Romain Mancel

•Henri Manhès (1889–1959)

•Alfred Marinais

•Gilbert Médéric-Védy (1902–1944/Place of death: Paris)

•Jules Monnerot (1909–1995)

•Marcel Morel

•Paul Morel

•Andre Mutter (1901–1973)

•Paul Pagnier (1925–2004)

•Henri Pascal (1920–1989)

•Antoine Perez (xxxx–1943/Place of death: Munich / "München-Stadelheim")

•Marcel Pitois (xxxx–1943/Place of death: Munich / "München-Stadelheim")

•Louise Pitois (xxxx–1945)

•Louis Richer (xxxx–1943/Place of death: Munich / "München-Stadelheim")

•Maurice Ripoche (1895–1944/Place of death: Cologne / "Köln-Klingelpütz")

•Jules Rochelle (xxxx–1943/Place of death: Munich / "München-Stadelheim")

•Pierre Servagnat (1911–1995)

•Georges Wauters (1904–1990)

•Francois Wetterwald (1911–1993)

== See also ==
- French Resistance
- Liberation of France
- Vichy France
