= Odessa pogroms =

Series of anti-Jewish pogroms in Odessa, Ukraine (1821–1905)

- Mourners with the body of a Jewish pogrom victim, Odessa, 1905. (YIVO)
- Odessa, Russian Empire
- Location: 46.47826294749971°N 30.739892912479633°E
- Date: 1821, 1849, 1859, 1871, 1881, 1886, 1900, 1905, and 1918–1919

The Odessa pogroms were a series of violent anti-Jewish riots and attacks in the multi-ethnic port city of Odessa in the 19th and early 20th centuries. Odessa had become a successful and cosmopolitan city known for liberal attitudes, and a hotbed of revolutionary activity in the Russian Empire, with a growing and vital Jewish community that had grown more prosperous along with the city, even though the majority still lived in abject poverty. The pogroms became an international cause célèbre for the Jewish diaspora. Notable pogroms occurred in 1821, 1849, 1859, 1871, 1881, 1886, 1900, 1905, and 1918–1919, resulting in hundreds of Jewish deaths, thousands of injuries, and destruction of property, devastating the community and driving emigration.

The causes of the pogroms included religious and ethnic discrimination, economic competition and resultant economic antisemitism, and political changes. Odessa's population included Greek, Jewish, Russian, Ukrainian, and other communities, with the Jewish population growing to become the second-largest group behind Russians. The earlier pogroms, such as those in 1859 and 1871, were initiated by Greeks with Russians joining in. After 1871, the pogromists were mainly Russian joined by ethnic Ukrainians. Pogromists came from all different classes and occupations. Most modern-day historians argue that pre-1881 pogroms were "largely the product of frictions unleashed by modernization", rather than a resurgence of medieval antisemitism. The 1905 pogrom was markedly larger in scale, with over 500 casualties (80% Jewish), 300 injuries, and over 1600 homes and businesses damaged, and with heightened antisemitism spurred by economic and political turmoil.

Historians believe the police and hospital figures were likely an underestimate, with a range of estimates from likely over 800, to over 1000 killed, and approximately over 2000 or even up to 5000 wounded. Even the pre-20th century incidents were incited by perennial antisemitic tropes such as rumors of Jewish desecration of the church, conspiracy theories of Jewish complicity in assassinating the tsar or the patriarch, and blood libels. (Note: "Rumors that Jews had desecrated the Greek Orthodox Church and cemetery fanned the flames of anti-Semitism, driving many Greeks, sailors and dockworkers in particular, to participate in the pogroms of 1859 and 1871": "Between the murder of Alexander II and the first pogroms there were occasional references to the one Jew - a woman named Gesia Gel'fman - who had been involved with the group which had assassinated the emperor. This reverberated as rumors through country as the accusation that it was the Jews who actually killed the Tsar. Beyond this a law-suit was heard in St. Petersburg between the infamous propagator of the blood libel, Ippolit Liutostanskii and his publisher, in which Liutostanskii could spread the accusation that the Jews had offered him up to 100.000 Rbl. if he would not publish his works. Till then the books on the blood libel and the Talmud had not found buyers (or those that had were returned), but now these accusations were widely reported in the press . Liutostanskii's book had first appeared in 1876 and in 1879 there began in Kutais a trial based on the ritual slander . Sure enough somebody tried to create an incident through feigning an attempted ritual murder of his grand-child"; "The pogrom of 1821 grew directly out of anti-Jewish feeling fomented by the Greek revolution...killings and even accusations that Jews had used Christian blood for ritual purposes continued.... ...Greek immigrants...Gregory's killing, and who had spread the rumor that many Jews had participated in his death. ... Gregory's martyrdom was eventually transformed into a widely accepted tale of his humiliation at the hands of Jews. ...the increasing prominence of Jews in the export trade...overt hatred of Jews reached a particularly dangerous level. ...the Odessa pogrom of 1871...seriously challenged this belief...now acknowledged the widespread Russian antisemitism.... In the pogrom's aftermath, antisemitic incidents began to assume a distinct pattern..."; "Rumours that Jews had been directly involved in the Patriarch's ferocious murder fell on ready ears. ... During Easter 1859, Odessa Jews fell victim once again to Greek religious fanaticism."; "March 1, 1881 A band of revolutionary terrorists assassinated Tsar Alexander II. Rumors connected the Jews to the murder. Accusations against the Jews were made by the press. In Odessa, and elsewhere in the Pale of Settlements, there were predictions of a pogrom against the Jews."; "Almost every report from the provinces spoke of the Jewish role in the conspiracy that had aimed at Russia's ruin by regicide. Disseminated by local rabble rousers and mischievous rumor mongers, such stories came to fix upon the Jews as solely or primarily responsible for the evil deed...." Rogger, Hans. in; "As soon as the anti-Semitic papers began linking Jews to the assassination of Alexander II and reporting anticipated anti-Jewish riots, the Russian-language Jewish press became concerned. But its appeals to the government to suppess the anti-Semitic articles remained unanswered. ... Cases are on record of individuals attempting, sometimes successfully, to spark anti-Jewish riots by reading anti-Semitic newspaper articles aloud to a crowd. ... clearly revealing the anti-Semitic inclinations of certain Russian officials ... The anti-Semitic press campaign was an important ingredient in preparing the way for the pogroms in 1881. ... ...the anti-Semitic press was particularly important in the spread of these rumors ... outbreak of the first pogrom. After that, the course of events itself was conducive to the generation of anti-Jewish rumors. ... The endemic ineptitude of the local government officials, the strong anti-Semitic attitudes of many of them..."; "This politico-economic explanation of pogroms does not mean that we question the prevalence of antisemitism among non-Jews in the Pale of Settlement. Anti-Jewish attitudes were transferred from one generation to the next through family upbringing in the Pale (e.g.Grosfeld et al., 2013) as much as in other parts of Europe (e.g.Voigtländer and Voth, 2012). Many of the pogroms were justified by the perpetrators’ beliefs in blood libel (e.g.Klier and Lambroza, 1992a). Our results highlight the economic and political factors that led to outbursts of violence under the conditions of inherent religious and ethnic animosity.")

While most modern-day historians do not believe there is credible evidence that the tsarist state actively sponsored or centrally planned the pogroms, the tsar and his advisors created an environment of sanctioned antisemitism, toleration and leniency toward pogromists, and blamed Jews themselves for the events. Local authorities often failed to intervene, or in some cases actively abetted or perpetrated further violence. According to Victoria Khiterer, while historians debate whether the pogroms were spontaneous or organized by authorities (per Weinberg, somewhere between both extremes), there is evidence that the pogroms were part of a Russian government policy aimed at suppressing the revolutionary movement, for which Jews were a scapegoat. Right-wing organizations such as the Union of Russian People and the Black Hundreds knew they had support from sympathetic authorities to incite the violence. After the 1917 revolution, the pogroms were also perpetrated by the Bolshevik Red Army. The pogroms became an international symbol, and inspired the growth of Jewish intellectual and national movements as enlightened Jewish thinkers were forced to contend with pervasive antisemitism that threatened their lives.

== 1821 ==
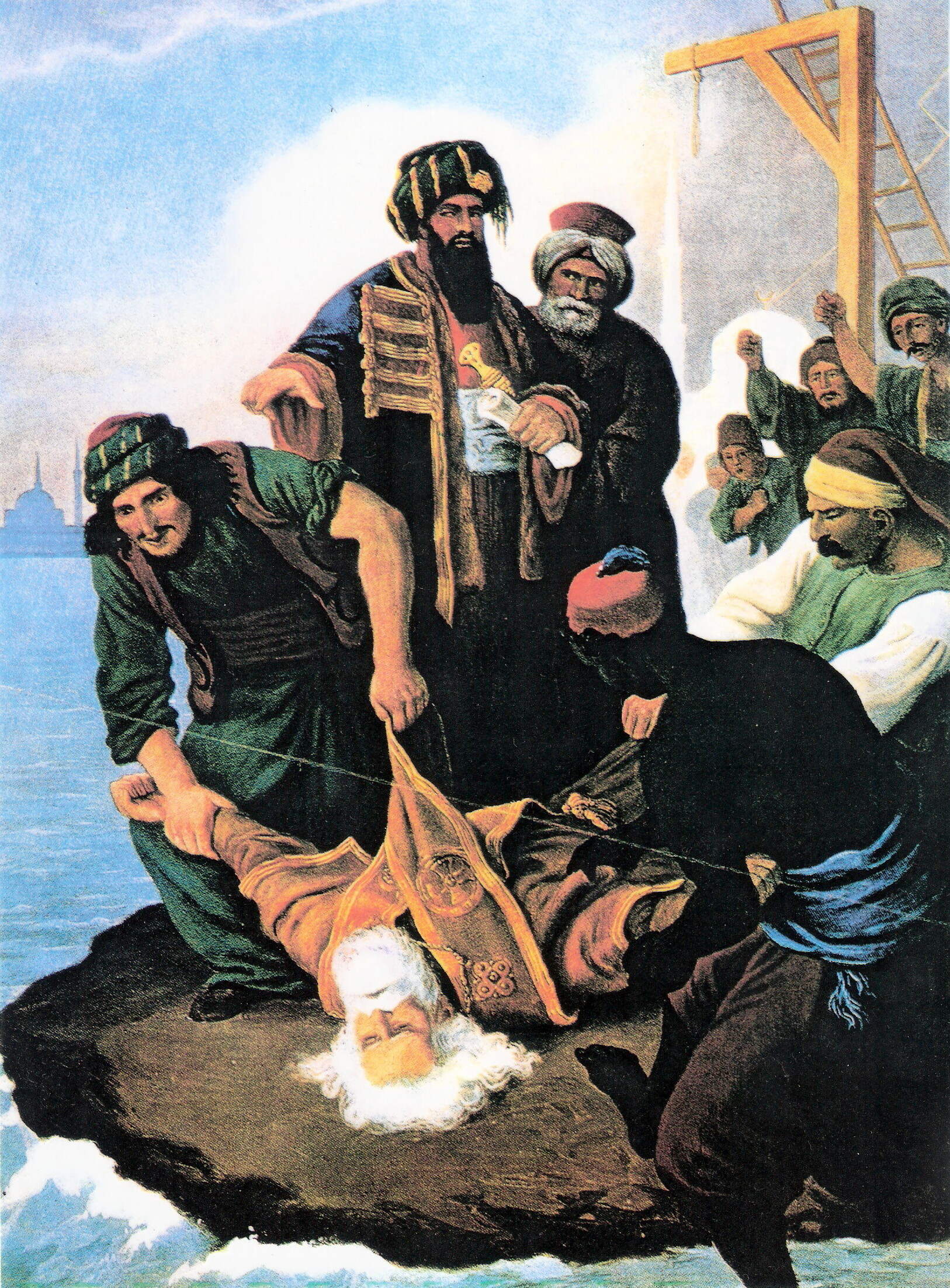
Peter von Hess, the casting of the corpse of Gregory into the Bosporus

The 1821 pogrom was a fairly serious riot, killing, wounding, and damaging the homes and businesses of Jews, but it was minimized and even dismissed by Jewish communal leaders and intellectuals. Much as in later pogroms, economic, religious, and national aspects motivated the out-of-control mob of pogromists, including Greek business owners who resented Jewish inroads into their territory. The Jewish population had grown from around 10% in 1795 to around 15% in the early 1820s.

During the Greek War of Independence, Jews had tended to support the Ottoman state and the Pax Ottomana as the best thing for them, as opposed to the Greek insurgency. On Easter Sunday night, 1821, Turkish officials, in an attempt to suppress Greek revolutionary activity, executed Patriarch Gregory V of Constantinople. He was hanged in front of his church, and his decapitated body was dragged through the streets and thrown into the sea. The body was found six days later by a Greek ship anchored under a Russian flag in the nearby gulf, which then sailed to Odessa.

Odessa, which had been a major anti-Ottoman revolutionary hotbed, a refuge for Greeks fleeing Ottoman authority, and home to organizations such as the Filiki Eteria, received Gregory's remains for burial. Due to personal intervention from Tsar Alexander I of Russia, the body was laid in state with three days of public worship and a public funeral. A large number of Greek immigrants, recently arrived from Constantinople, joined the funeral, spreading rumors that Jews had participated in Gregory's death, or that they had mocked his body. Jews were further accused of using Christian blood for ritual purposes. Right after the ceremony, Greeks attacked Jewish homes and businesses, shattering windows, smashing doors, and beating Jews with sticks in three Jewish neighborhoods. Russian authorities warned Jews to stay at home, but not everyone listened. Heinrich Zschokke witnessed the pogrom and reported several casualties. Russian antisemites joined forces with the Greeks, and casualties numbered 17 and over 60 wounded.

== 1849 ==
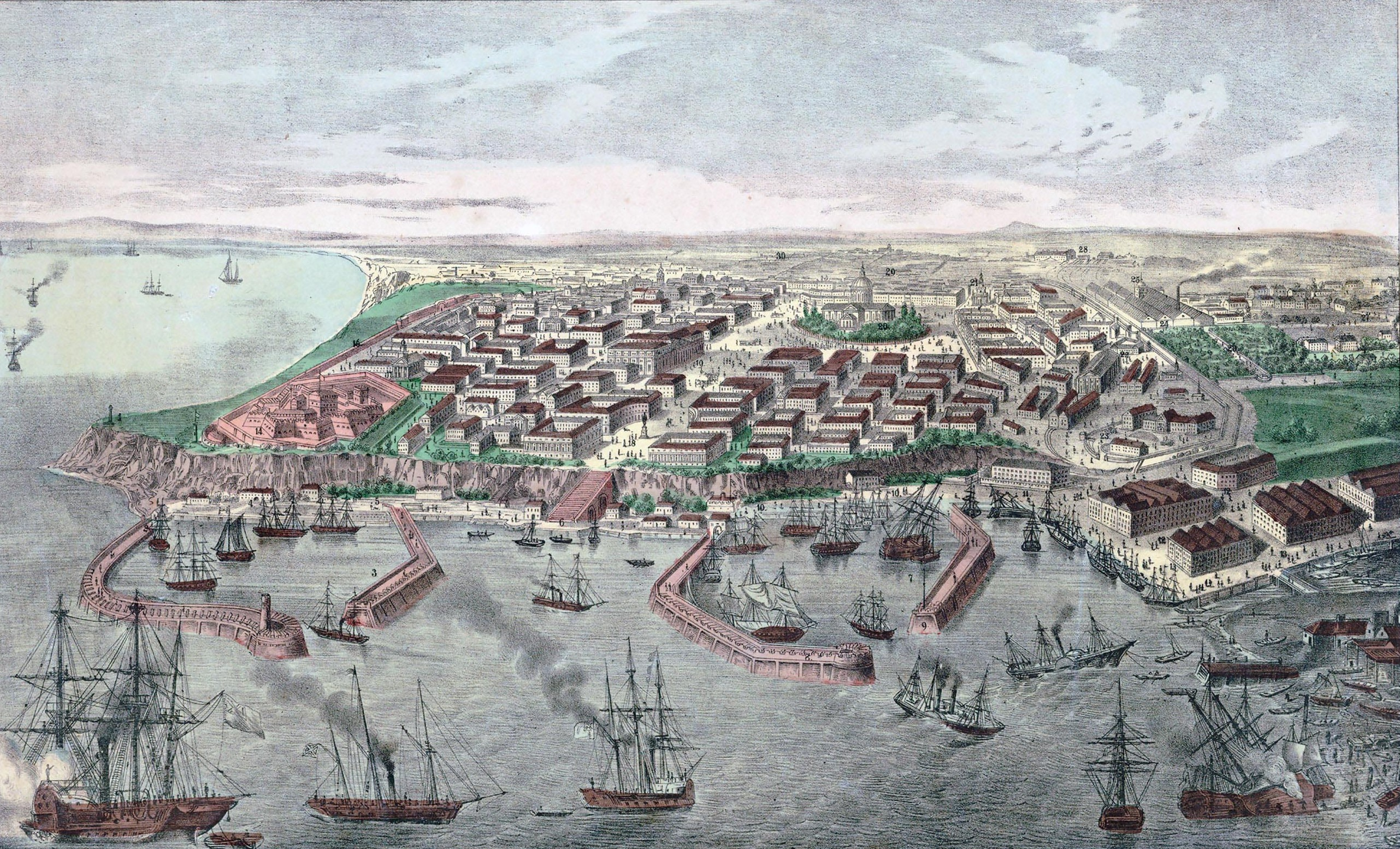
1850 map of Odessa

Riots reoccurred in August 1849 due to supposed Jewish disrespect during a procession from St. Michael's Golden-Domed Monastery. It was reported that Jews refused to doff their caps as ordered by the Odessa chief of police. 15,000 rubles of damage were done and shops were sacked and looted in the Jewish quarter. This was a local event and did not attract attention elsewhere.

== 1859 ==
The 1859 Easter pogrom was the first pogrom in Odessa to receive major journalistic attention. It was the next major pogrom after 1821, as pogroms were becoming endemic in Odessa. Jews were accused of killing a Christian child in a ritual murder with the pogromists reportedly chanting "You drink our blood, you rob us." Alexander Stroganov, the governor, ascribed the events to religious fanaticism; indeed, that was the cause of the pogrom. This was not a Russian-led but a Greek-led pogrom; the leaders and almost all of the participants were Greek sailors or locals. Rumors that Jews had desecrated the Greek Orthodox Church and cemetery were what drove to the participation of many Greek sailors and dockworkers; these same rumors incited antisemitism. The local press described it as an accidental fight. At the time, Greeks dominated the administration and commerce of Odessa. One person died and five were wounded in the pogrom.

== 1871 ==
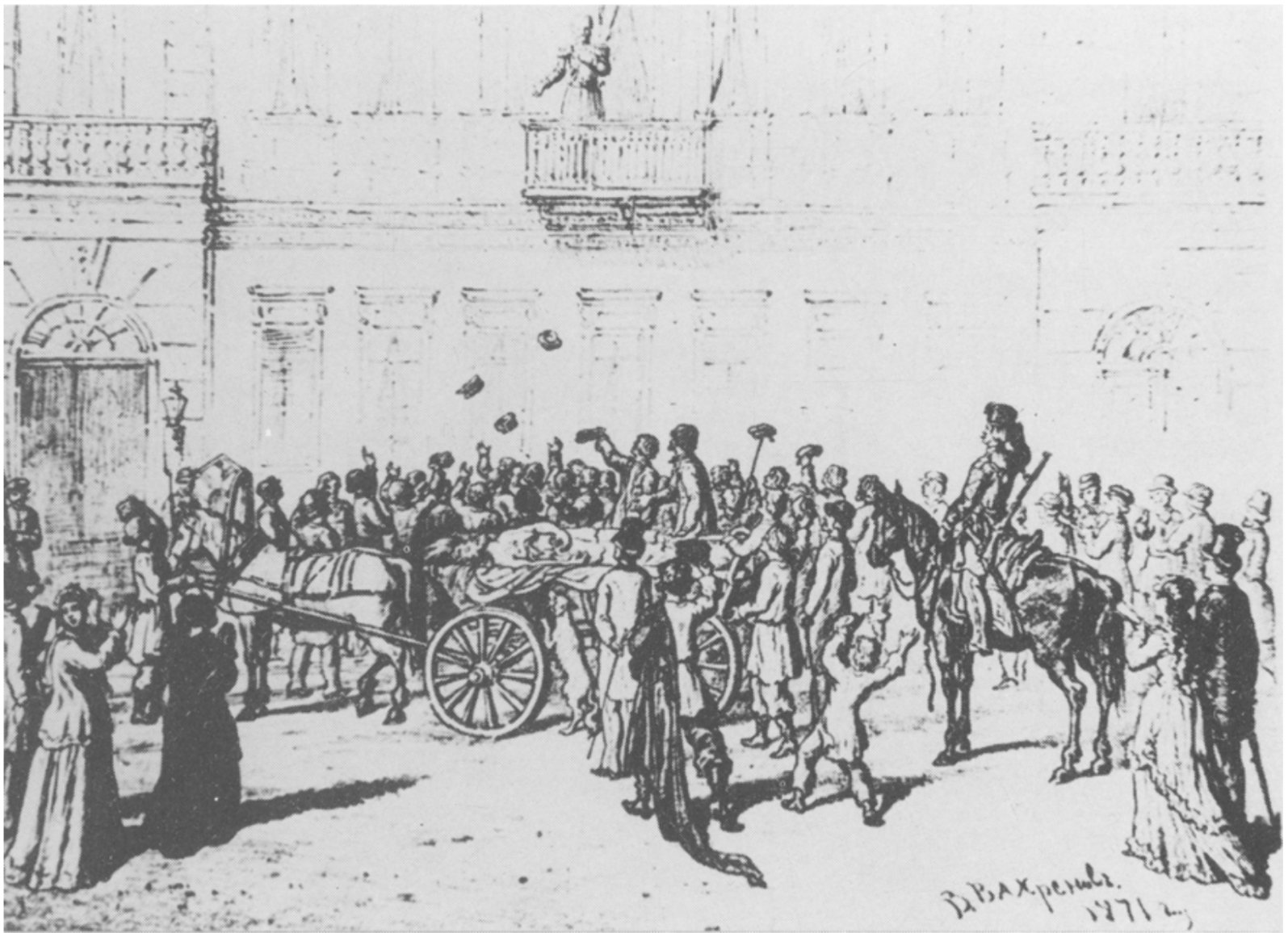
1871 drawing by Vakhrenov depicts Kotsebue on balcony addressing the pogromists

The 1871 pogrom started as a street fight during Greek Orthodox Holy Week before escalating into a serious riot, leading to the destruction of Jewish property and 600 arrests. In the four days following May 27, 1871, six were killed, 21 wounded, over 800 houses and 500 businesses damaged, and every street or square in the Jewish neighborhood felt some impact from the pogrom, leaving thousands homeless, and doing over 1.5 million rubles worth of damage. Pogromists started by breaking the windows to test boundaries, before intensifying the rampage. They attacked and looted Jewish as well as Christian businesses, beat policemen, and even threatened priests. They then smashed furniture and belongings inside homes and businesses. Cossack troops, called in to restore order after the declaration of martial law, delayed and took several days to take action, with their first action being to disperse the Jews who were protecting their property. They then reportedly let the pogromists proceed with non-lethal violence, despite orders to disperse them and send them home. Censorship limited the ability of Odessa newspapers to report on the events, but the press in Saint Petersburg published sympathetic accounts.

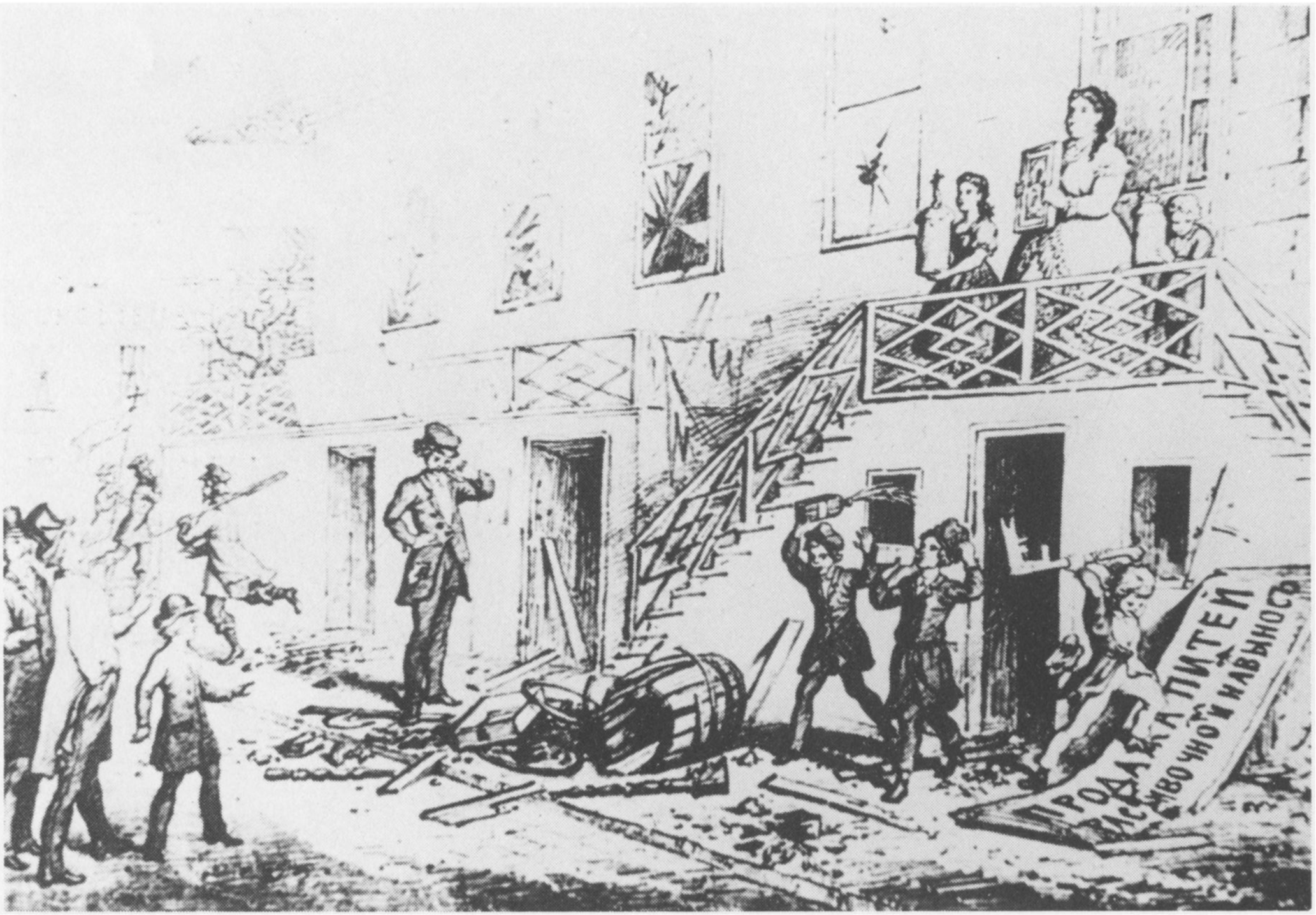
Vakhrenkov drawing shows women and children, top right, holding icons and religious artifacts in hopes of deterring pogromists

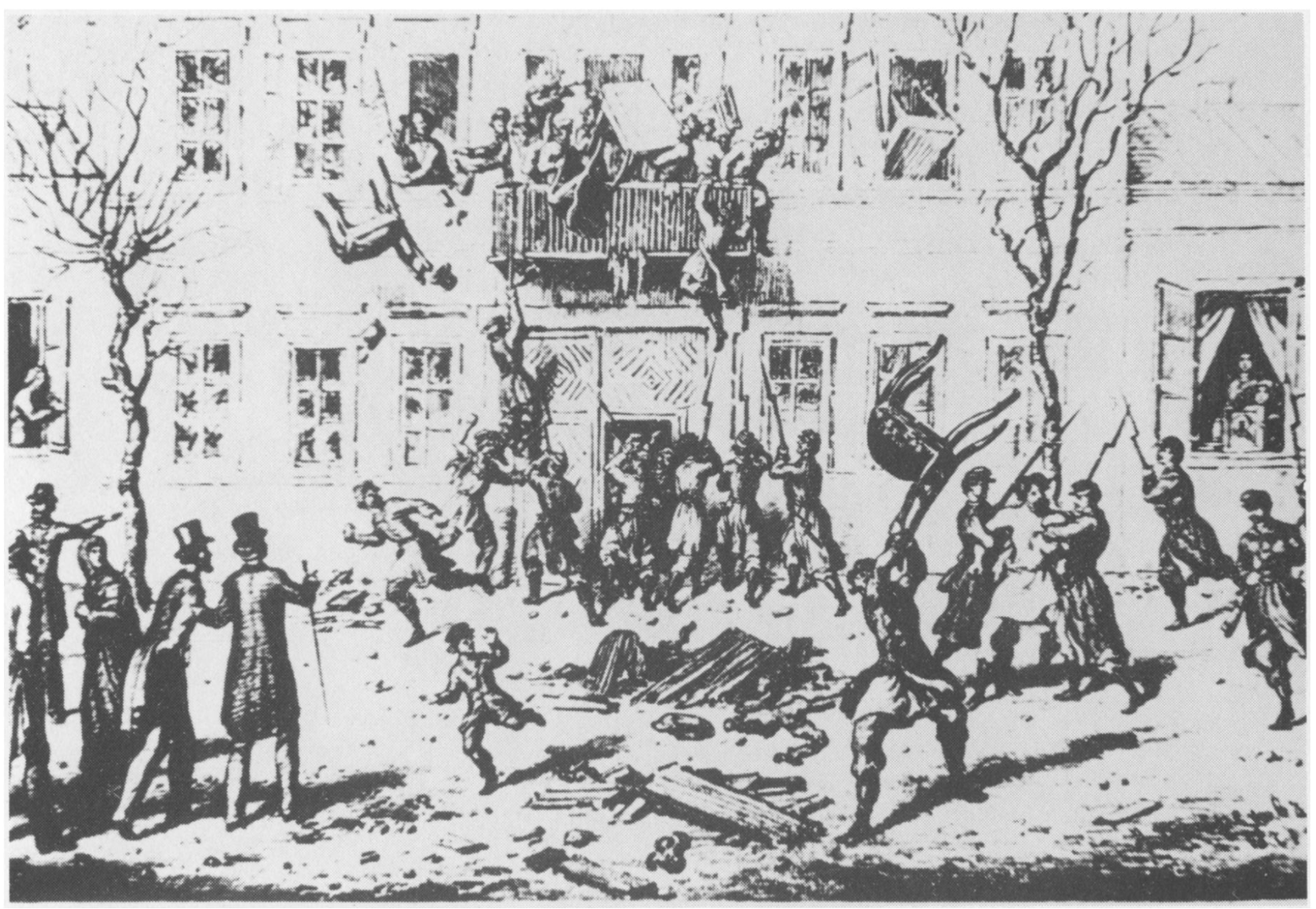
1871 drawing by Vakhrenov shows upper-class people looking on as pogromists destroy property

Governor-General Pavel Kotsebue waited several days before ordering the military to intervene, allowing pogromists to run wild in the meantime. Pogromists spread a rumor that an imperial edict would tolerate vandalism of Jewish homes so long as fatalities were limited. Kotsebue did not crack down or take on a harsher tone toward the pogromists until they had reached his personal home, where he addressed them from a balcony. Stones were said to have been thrown at him in his balcony from the crowd, and he decided the next day to intervene decisively.

Greek merchants were the masterminds of the pogrom. Economic competition between the Jews and Greeks can be seen as one of the causes of the violence. The poor, underemployed, and unskilled were the main participants of the mob. Rumors spread that Jews had damaged or stolen a holy cross. There were also "rumor-memories" regarding Gregory V, accompanied by lithographs distributed of him, that "people of a different faith" were going to steal his remains and stop them from being repatriated to Athens. Russian and Jews alike would display Christian icons in windows and doors of shops and stalls to deter pogromists as a bid to avoid damage to their property, a gambit that was sometimes successful. They would sometimes be granted mercy if they agreed to wear a cross. Rumors that Jews had desecrated the Greek Orthodox Church and cemetery led to the participation of many Greek sailors and dockworkers, while the perception of Jews as an economic threat fueled Russian participation. Some Russian people, among them Orthodox priests, acted to protect the Jews and stopped cross-brandishing mobs. Some ordinary Russians helped by hiding them in their homes or cellars, while a few cosmopolitan locals organized protection for the businesses of their Jewish acquaintances.

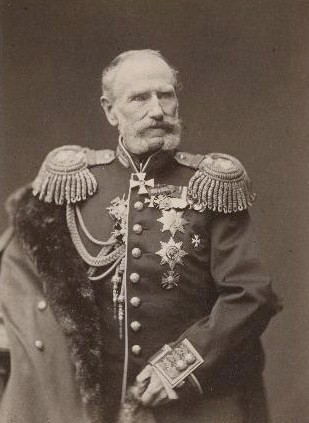
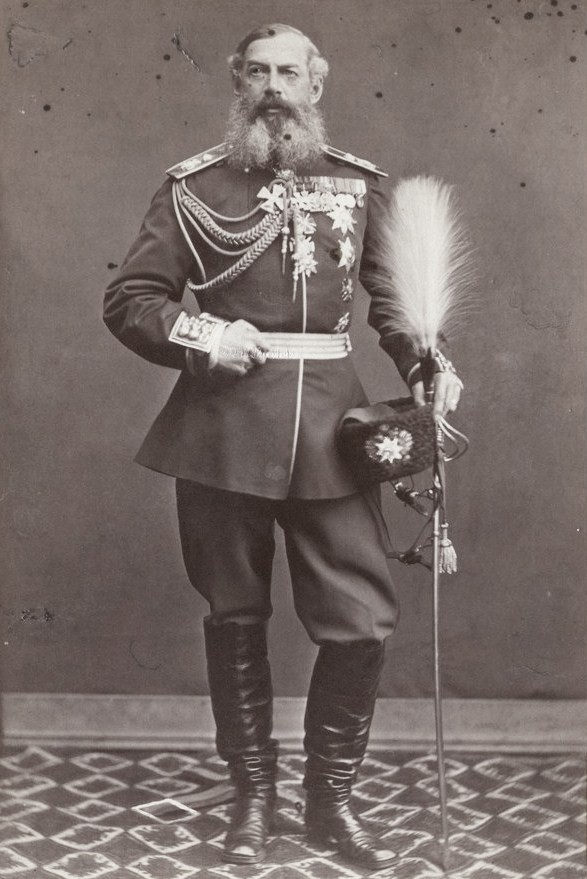
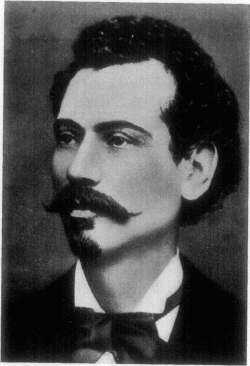
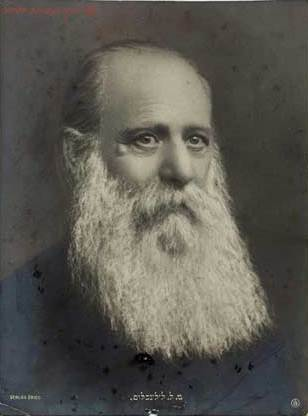
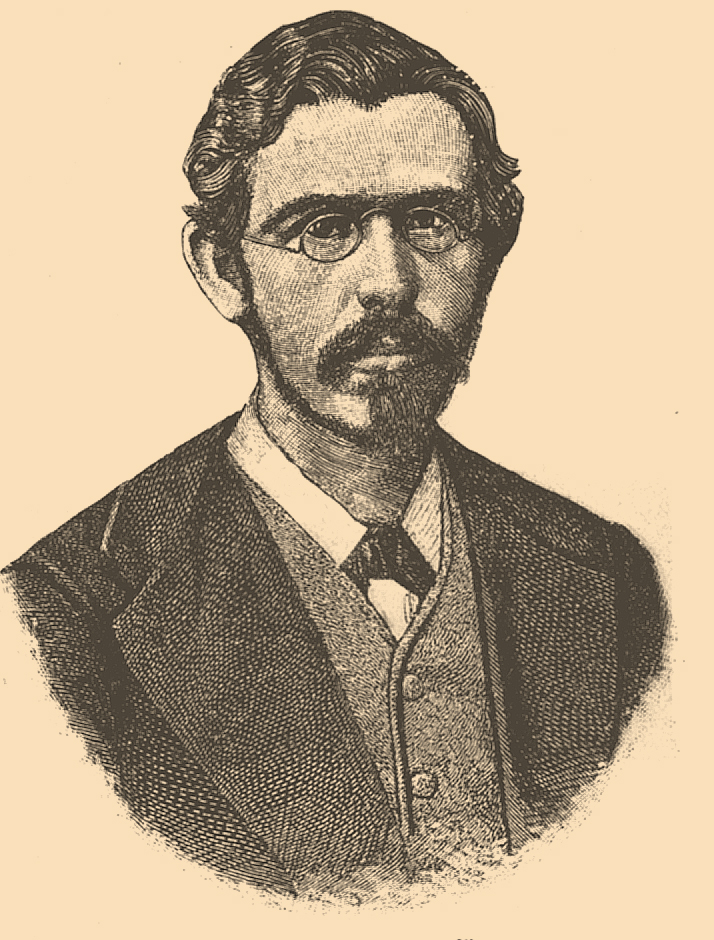
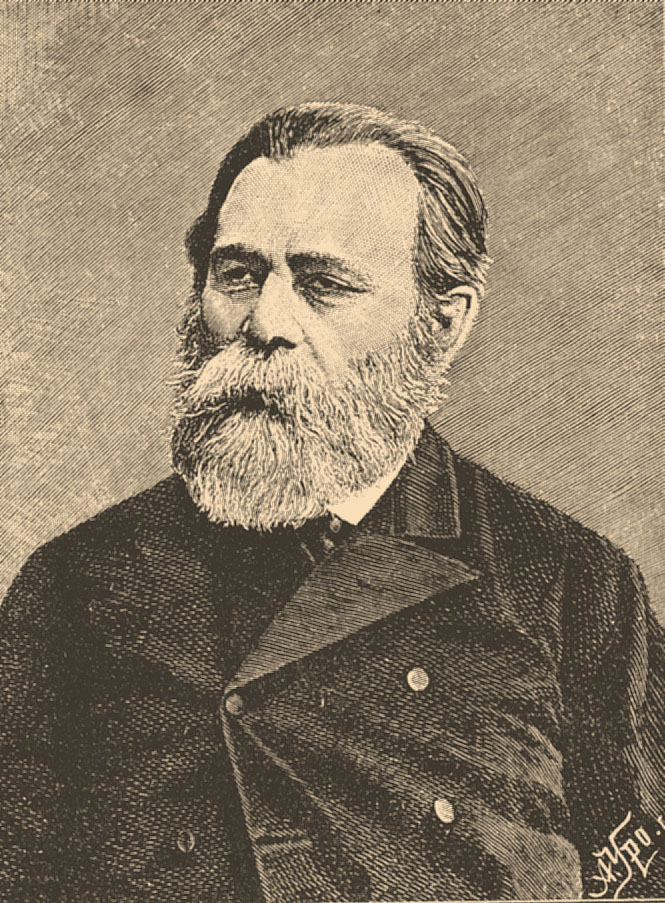
Left to right, top to bottom: Kotzebue, Dondukov-Korsakov, Smolenskin, Lilienblum, Orshansky, Pinsker

This pogrom is seen as a turning point in Russian Jewish history. After 1871, Odessa's intelligentsia, particularly the maskilim, took a less optimistic view of Russian society's progress toward toleration and enlightened liberalism, acknowledging that pervasive antisemitism was not an anachronism but a reality. Peretz Smolenskin is one prominent example of a Russian Jewish writer living in Odessa who began to question the possibility of Jewish integration, and called for greater awareness of Jewish national identity. Another thinker who became doubtful of Jewish-Russian relations was Leon Pinsker. Local Jewish journalist and lawyer Mikhail Kulisher wrote, "beneath the apparently accidental and singular Odessa pogrom we discovered something of enduring importance, namely, that Judeophobia was not a theoretical error of some kind ... [but] a psychic attitude in which centuries upon centuries of hatred was reflected."

To protect the city's reputation, authorities and the press downplayed the pogrom's severity, portraying the events as minor disturbances caused by the festivities, and long-standing traditional animosity between Greeks and Jews. They also blamed stolen liquor from taverns and warehouses as contributing to the unrest. Authorities and newspapers also blamed Jews themselves. The local administration concluded that, "antipathy of Christians, primarily from the lower classes, is reinforced by bitterness arising from the exploitation of their labor by the Jews, and the latter's ability to get rich and to dominate all [commerce]. From the crowds of Christians [one] often heard, 'The Jews mock Christ, they get rich, and they suck our blood.'" The abolition of serfdom in Russia changed economics for the peasantry, but also accompanied a rise in antisemitic ideas of Jewish criminality, domination, and exploitation. Peasants whose conditions didn't improve from the 1861 reforms scapegoated visible Jewish communities, whose status seemed to be rising. Amidst revolutionary threats and labor unrest, elites blamed Jews for problems of modernization and industrialization.

Ilya Orshansky wrote in 1871, "Until such time as the divergence between the Jews’ actual and juridical position in Russia is permanently removed by eliminating all existing limitations on their rights, hostility to the Jews will not only persist, but in all likelihood will increase." In an influential editorial on the pogroms for the Russian language Jewish publication, Den, published in 1877 after being censored in 1871, Orshansky wrote that the discriminatory legal regime had rendered Jews social outcasts, who were punished when they achieved an amelioration of the lower-class status deemed their deserved position. He wrote:

Every nationality making up the urban population of southern Russia, meeting competition from other nationalities in the exploitation of the area's resources, cannot claim any precedence, since all are equal. Thus, the Russian has no special hostility towards the Greek, seeing him as another citizen with full equality to live and enrich himself. But when facing a Jew, consigned by the law to last place in everything, who has nonetheless gotten rich, he regards him as virtually a thief and as one who can legitimately be plundered.

One Russian eyewitness reported that when asking one poor woman why she was lighting a stall of a likely poor Jewish proprietor on fire, she was confused and replied, "Do you think we could destroy and beat Jews for three whole days if that had not been the will of the authorities?" Governor Kotsebue's official reports were an attempt at damage control. He had a limited police force, but the authorities could have foreseen the risk, given that riots typically started during the Greek Orthodox holidays. The inadequate police response led to the perception that the authorities were unwilling to stop anti-Jewish rioting or that the central government approved. For his part, Kotsebue attacked the press, writing:

In the Petersburg and Moscow newspapers there continues to appear correspondence about the disorders which took place in Odessa, filled with exaggerated or completely false news. Such correspondence is sent to foreign newspapers. In large part it is written by Jews, with the objective of influencing public opinion everywhere for the assistance of the suffering Jewish community in Odessa. If our capital newspapers eagerly open their columns to such correspondence, not even knowing the authors, then it meets an even more joyful reception in the foreign press, for this press is found almost everywhere in the hands of Jews or employs their participation as the closest of collaborators.

The intelligentsia became skeptical of Russification, and led to the collapse of the Russian-Jewish newspaper Razvet and the Society for the Dissemination of Education among the Jews of Russia (ORPME) shut down its branch in Odessa. The pogrom altered the intellectual landscape, and spurred Jewish national consciousness among Odessa thinkers such as Pinsker and Moshe Leib Lilienblum.

Governor-General Prince A.M. Dondukov-Korsakov proposed further restricting Jews from leasing rural estates, blaming them for the unrest, although his proposal was rejected.

The pogroms accelerated emigration to the United States, and from Eastern to Western Europe, and made Jews there more aware of the refugee situation. The Franco-Prussian War, which ended in 1871, had interfered with access to ports in Europe and international travel. A few thousand Jews arrived in America from Russia every year starting in the 1870s, many of whom were refugees fleeing Russia.

Meanwhile, the American consul, Timothy Smith, mirrored Russian prejudices and wrote: "As a race [Jewish people] are unproductive, averse to labor, occupying themselves from preference as go betweens, engaged in all manner of 'commerce.'" In response to the 1871 pogroms in Odessa, Eugene Schuyler sent a memo to the U.S. State Department in 1872 identifying restrictions on most Jewish movement, property ownership, and work in Russia, writing, "the Hebrew population has a natural tendency to exploit the population in the midst of which it is settled. Now, since the spread of Slavonophile and ultra-Russian ideas, it is not unusual to find strong liberals and democrats, who are animated with the feelings of the Middle Ages toward the Hebrews, and even some of the prominent journals... are constantly attacking them."

== 1881 ==
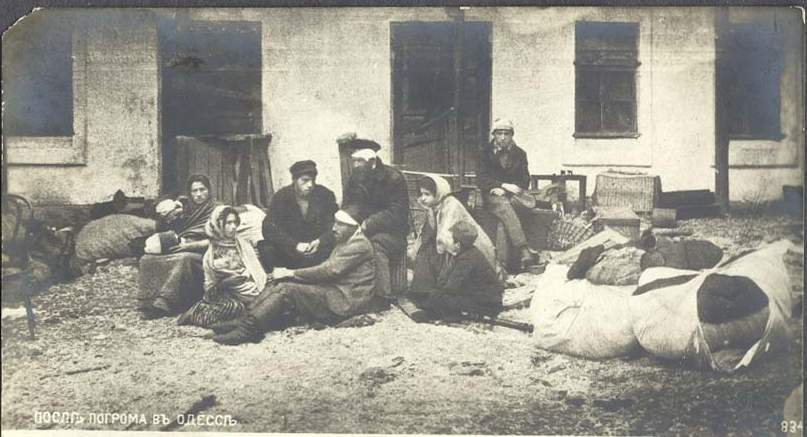
Poor Jewish family facing the aftermath of the 1881 pogrom

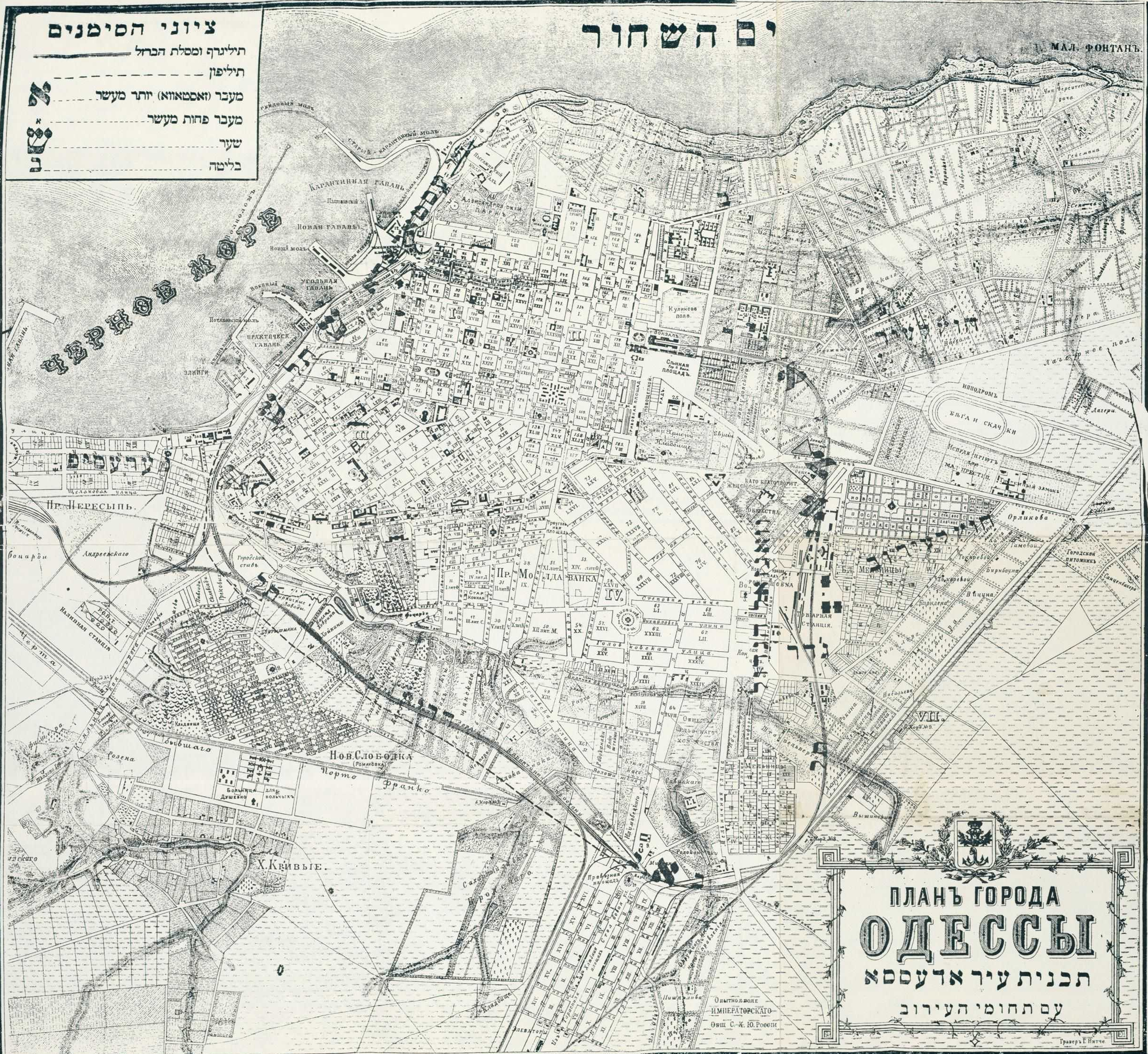
1894 Hebrew and Russian map of Odessa eruv which encompasses Odessa city center and the Moldavanka Jewish neighborhood (National Library of Israel)

The 1881 attacks exceeded the 1871 pogrom in their scope and brutality. According to the police chief's report, 528 houses sustained broken windows, 335 apartments were looted, 151 shops vandalized, and 401 shops looted, with a total amount of 10 million rubles in damage. Antisemitic rumors and blood libels were spread that Jews had murdered Tsar Alexander II and of ritual murder of a child. Rumors were spread of a tsar's order to attack Jews. Antisemitic newspaper articles spread rumors and innuendos but intentionally stopped short of recommending actual violence explicitly. Some pogromists claimed they were celebrating the anniversary of the 1871 pogrom.

When Gessia Gelfman, the one Jewish woman involved in the assassination plot, was spared execution as a humanitarian act and a concession to the popular opinion in the West at the time, it was attributed to Jewish "trickery" and "cunning" to avoid punishment for their "misdeeds." The press spread rumors and antisemitic opinions, but were rarely censored or otherwise reined in.

The 1881 pogroms were an urban phenomenon occurring in several waves, and traditionally thought to have arisen from a secret society known as the Holy Brotherhood, encouraged by the government, to blame the Jews for popular dissatisfaction with the government. Modern historians have pointed out that the degree to which the 1881 pogroms were spontaneous or organized and if planned, by whom, are still a mystery. The growing Jewish role as employers, in lending money, and supplying goods, particularly liquor, drove resentment, and this only increased as Jews established new businesses and built new homes. Competition may have led artisans and merchants to spread rumors or promote antisemitic material, or to approve or passively look on as others engaged in antisemitic activities. The pogroms spread along highways, rivers, and rail lines in a continuous fashion, with Odessa as a source of concentration. The state institutions only intervened when it was more than Jewish lives or homes being threatened.

In the 1881 and 1905 pogroms, many Greek houses were destroyed by Russian antisemites as well.

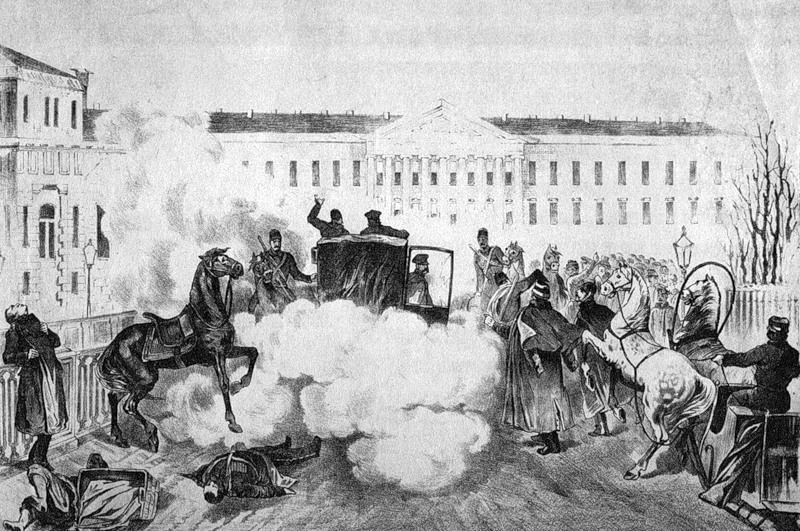
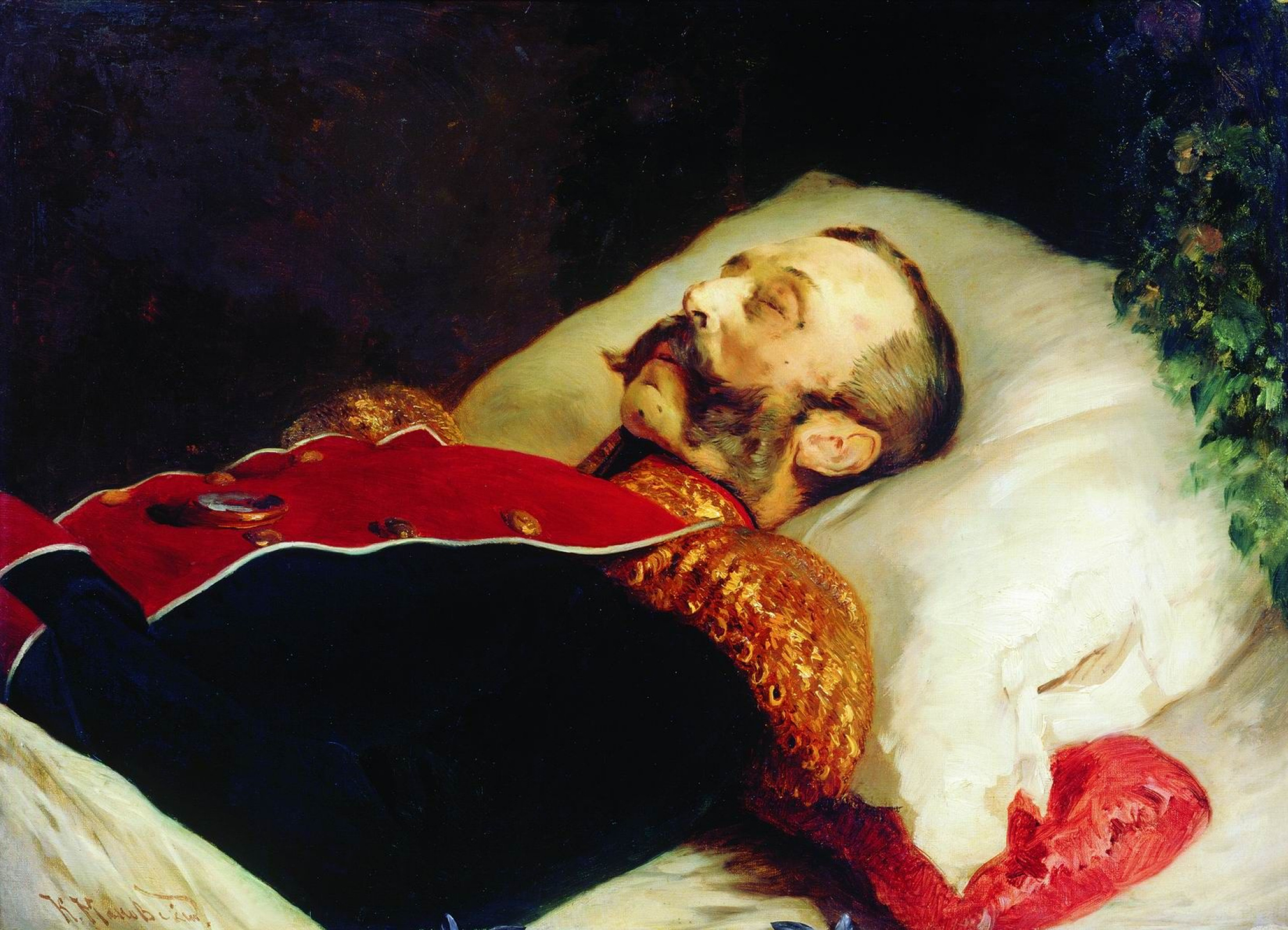
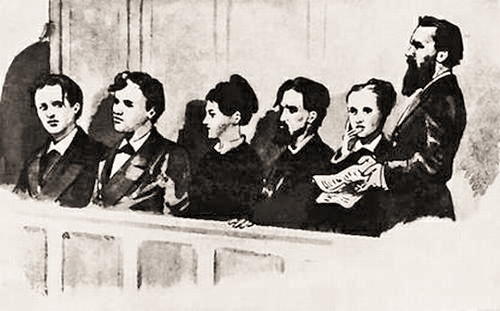
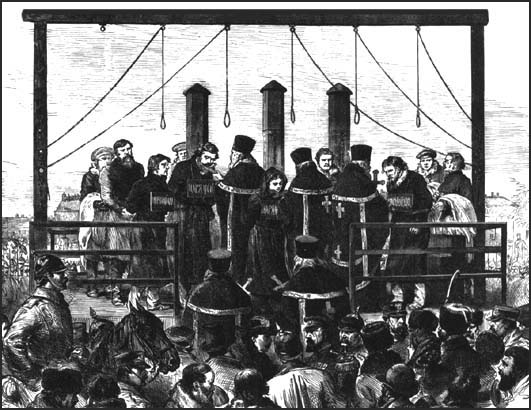
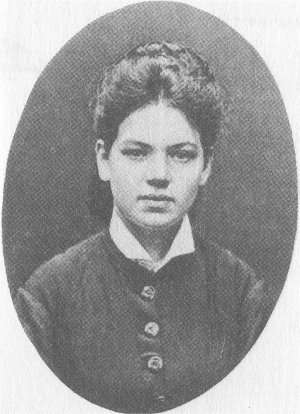
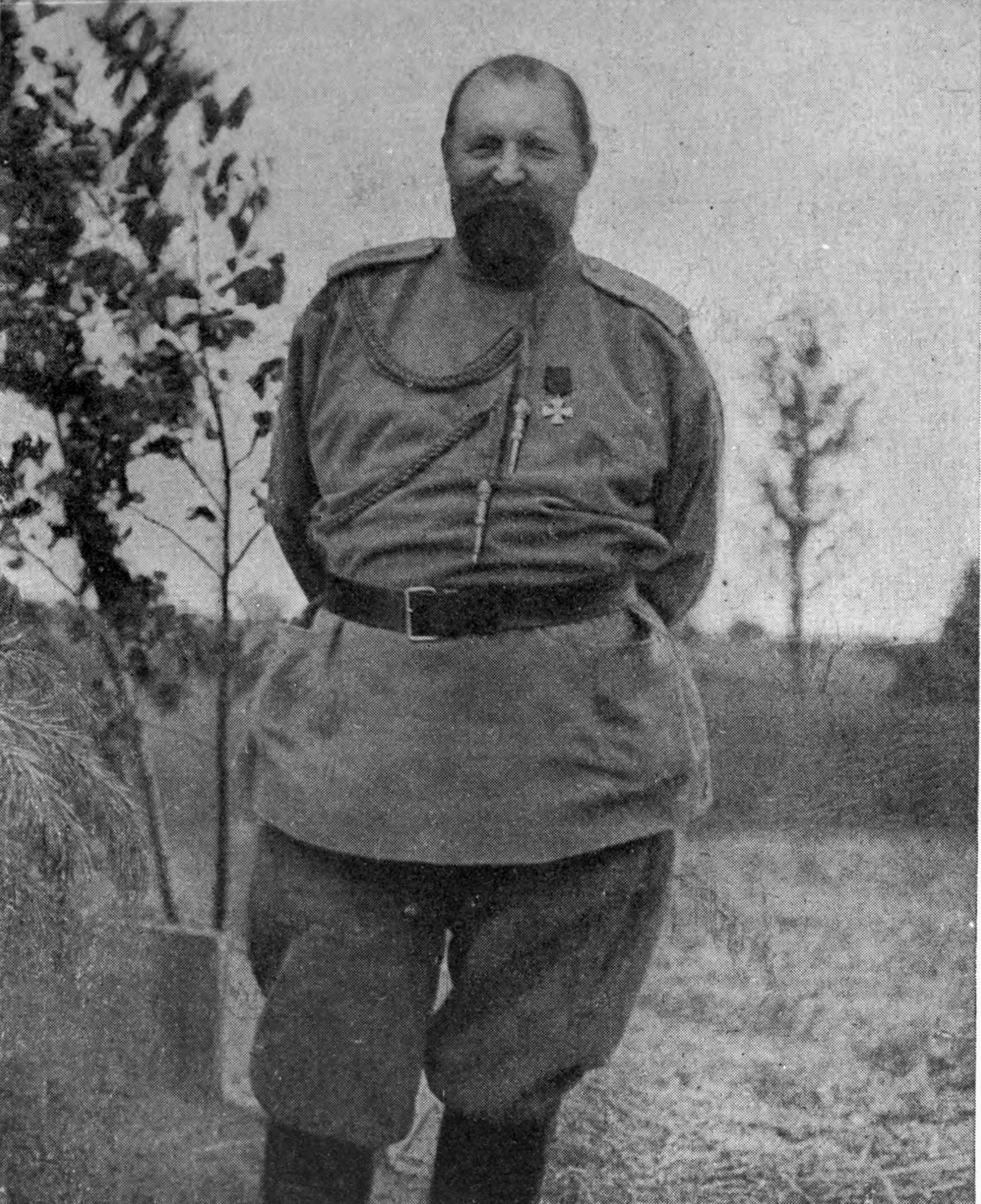
Left to right, top to bottom: Assassination of the tsar, tsar on his deathbed, Gelfman and conspirators on trial 1881, execution of the conspirators, portrait of Gelfman 1870s, Ignatiev in 1915

Jewish self-defense as in Odessa was the exception not the rule. In response to circulating rumors and the history of antisemitism in Odessa, Jewish students organized recruitment, procurement of weapons, and training, but it arrived too late. They were only able to have one day of preparation before the pogroms broke out May 3, 1881.

Like the 1871 pogrom, the 1881 pogrom disillusioned Jewish intellectuals of the haskalah who had to reconcile the reality of antisemitism. The pogrom rattled the comfortable complacency of Odessa's upper class Jews, suggesting that assimilation did not improve their conditions. This pogrom cemented Leon Pinsker's view that Jewish integration would not be possible.

Governor-General Prince A.M. Dondukov-Korsakov expressed anti-Jewish prejudices in his critical reports on the causes of the pogroms. He wrote to St. Petersburg, "Jewish exploitation and predatory methods provoked the antagonism of the lower strata." Korsakov justified the resentment by echoing stereotypes, accusing Jews of being unproductive middlemen, and claiming that they swindled the peasants, while overlooking the system of antisemitism in Russia that restricted Jews to certain types of employment:

The exploitation of local populations by the Jews, who control all sectors of trade in the cities and villages, including their commercial practices, provokes serious antipathy among the agricultural population and the lower classes of the city. The special commercial attitude that the Jews “import” to all sectors of business, even spiritual occupations, turns public opinion against them. Even the notaries and authors, their exemplary representatives who are above all prejudices and are not a part of the system of exploitation, do not inspire fondness for the Jews. In the educational institutions, which are packed with Jewish students, the Christian parents express strong misgivings, which are confirmed every day by the ethical dissipation of the children of the Jews. ... The Jewish question is very severe, it is the line in the sand not only in economic but also in social and educational life. The Jewish question preoccupies all sectors of work and, due to mistakes and negligence, results in extreme manifestations and actions.

Even in the event of a ban on the sale of alcohol by Jews, their continued presence in the villages, either as small-scale “manufacturers” and merchants or as farmers or owners of land, will always have deleterious effects on the economic, social and moral lives of the villages ... by buying or renting land of the Gentiles, they replace them and become undesirable neighbours... Due to their higher economic standing compared to the villagers, the Jews “partake” to a greater extent in middle and higher education even in those educational institutions run by Gentiles. This impedes the spread of education among the Christian population. This fact could lead in the immediate future to the Jews manifestly dominating in this region and, combined with their undisputed economic pre-eminence, constitutes a serious threat... the Jews acquire more “sophisticated” methods of exploitation and, as a cosmopolitan people organized from within in a caste system with exclusionary tribal interests, are a serious threat not only to the economic fate of the region but also to urban and political development not to mention to the moral views of the dominant tribe.

Minister of the interior Nikolai Ignatev, widely described as holding antisemitic prejudice, stated, "The main cause of this movement lies in the economic situation. During the previous twenty years, the Jews have taken over trade and industry, purchased areas of land by sale or lease, and by means of their unity have succeeded in exploiting the main body of the poor, hence arousing them to a protest, which has found distressing expression in acts of violence." This led to the discriminatory May Laws, which were designed to appease Russians and stop their "exploitation," adding economic limitations to Jews and making them effectively second-class citizens. These laws created a foundation for a police state. Simon Dubnow referred to the May laws as a "legislative pogrom." Tsar Alexander III of Russia, on the advice of Konstantin Pobedonostsev, also accepted Ignatev's view that Jewish exploitation had caused the pogroms, and took a protective position toward the Russian peasantry, and a more hostile one toward Jews, saying, "But we must never forget that the Jews crucified our Lord and shed his precious blood." Pobedonostsev didn't support violence against Jews, but did want to increase restrictions on them to reduce their "harm" to Russian society. The restrictions were opposed, unsuccessfully, by finance minister Ivan Vyshnegradsky and his successor Sergei Witte.

The belief that Jews themselves were responsible for the pogrom was a result of widespread anti-Jewish sentiment among the bureaucracy, which then prompted the government to respond slowly, which prompted a conspiracy theory that the government was behind the pogroms. The government did nonetheless eventually feel threatened by, and feared for its stability from, the pogroms, and at last tried to quell the unrest and restore order.

Almost 2 million Jews left the Russian Empire for the United States, Western Europe, Latin America, and Australia in the aftermath of the 1881–1882 pogroms.

The British consul observed that Jewish shopowners and moneylenders filled a critical economic role and improved the lives of peasants in a high risk area, without whom they might be unable to obtain financing or necessities at all, or certain goods at reasonable prices. "Were the Jews to leave South Russia its trade would entirely collapse."

== 1886 ==
Anti-Jewish riots also occurred in 1886. Several hundred rioters verbally and physically assaulted Jewish pedestrians near the Kulykove Pole railroad station after a post-Easter religious and civic feast, and proceeded to go through town breaking windows. Two Jewish shops were destroyed, with looting and damage to houses.

== 1900 ==
A serious pogrom that killed and wounded Jews, and damaged Jewish homes and businesses, also occurred in 1900.

== 1905 ==
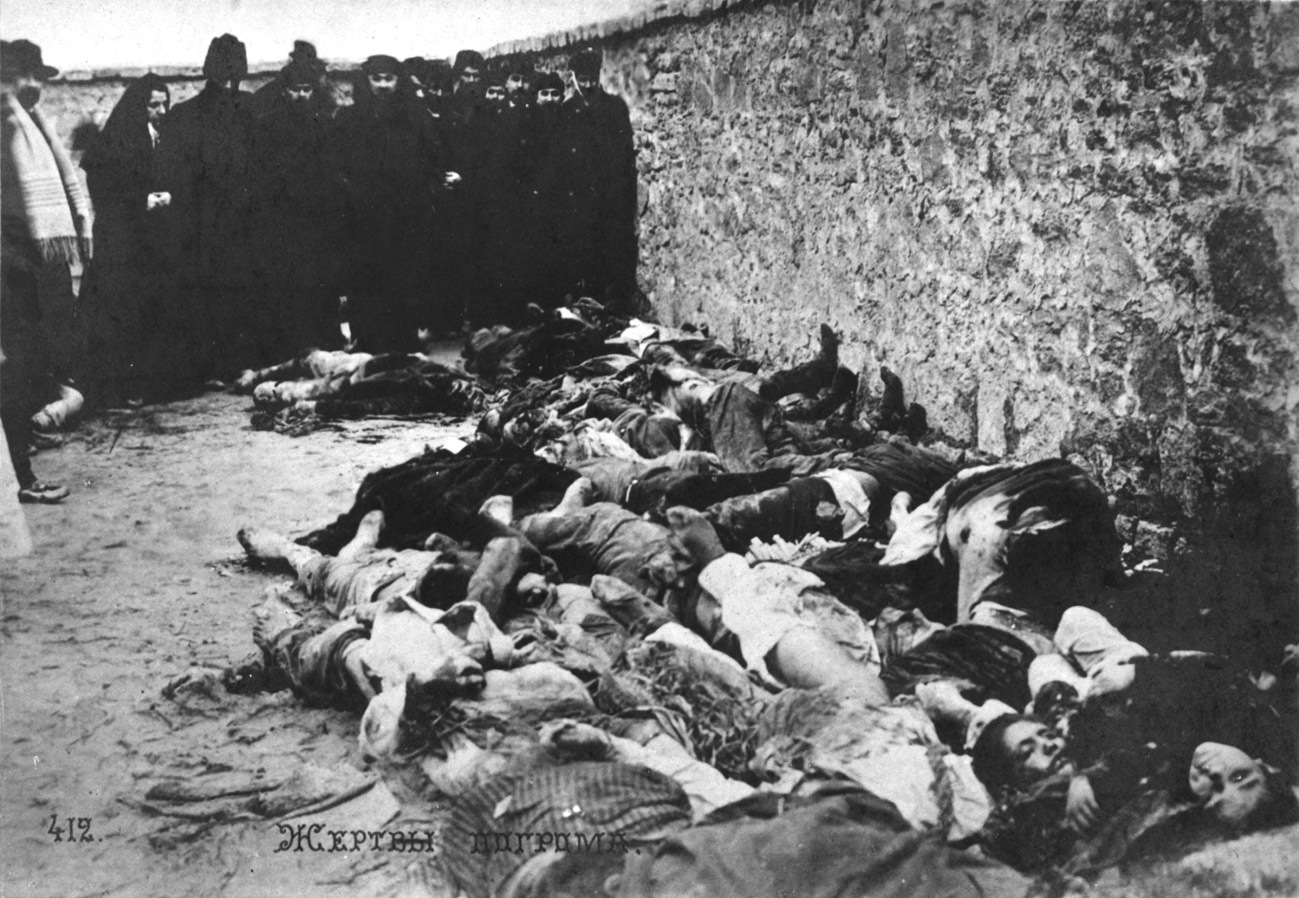
Postcard with photograph of bodies of dead victims littering the street after the 1905 Odessa Pogrom, Museum of the History of Odessa Jews

The 1905 pogrom of Odessa was the worst anti-Jewish pogrom in Odessa's history. Between 18 and 22 October 1905, ethnic Russians, Ukrainians, and Greeks claimed over 400 Jewish victims and damaged or destroyed over 1600 Jewish properties. Historians such as Weinberg and Lambroza believe the police and hospital figures were likely an underestimate, with a range of estimates from likely over 800, to over 1000 killed, and approximately over 2000 or even up to 5000 wounded. Pogroms also swept through the shtetls in 1905–1907.

=== Background and causes ===
Odessa had become the country's most important port city, home to banks, brokerage houses, sugar refineries, and other factories, and also had a vibrant intellectual culture that reflected cosmopolitan Europe. Despite being widely known as a city of liberal, enlightened attitudes toward the Jewish population, which suggests a relatively more favorable environment for Jews than in many other parts of the Pale of Settlement, Odessa was also home to fervent antisemitic views. Rumors of a pogrom arose each year around Eastertime. Jewish and Russian youths also often got into violent fights with each other.

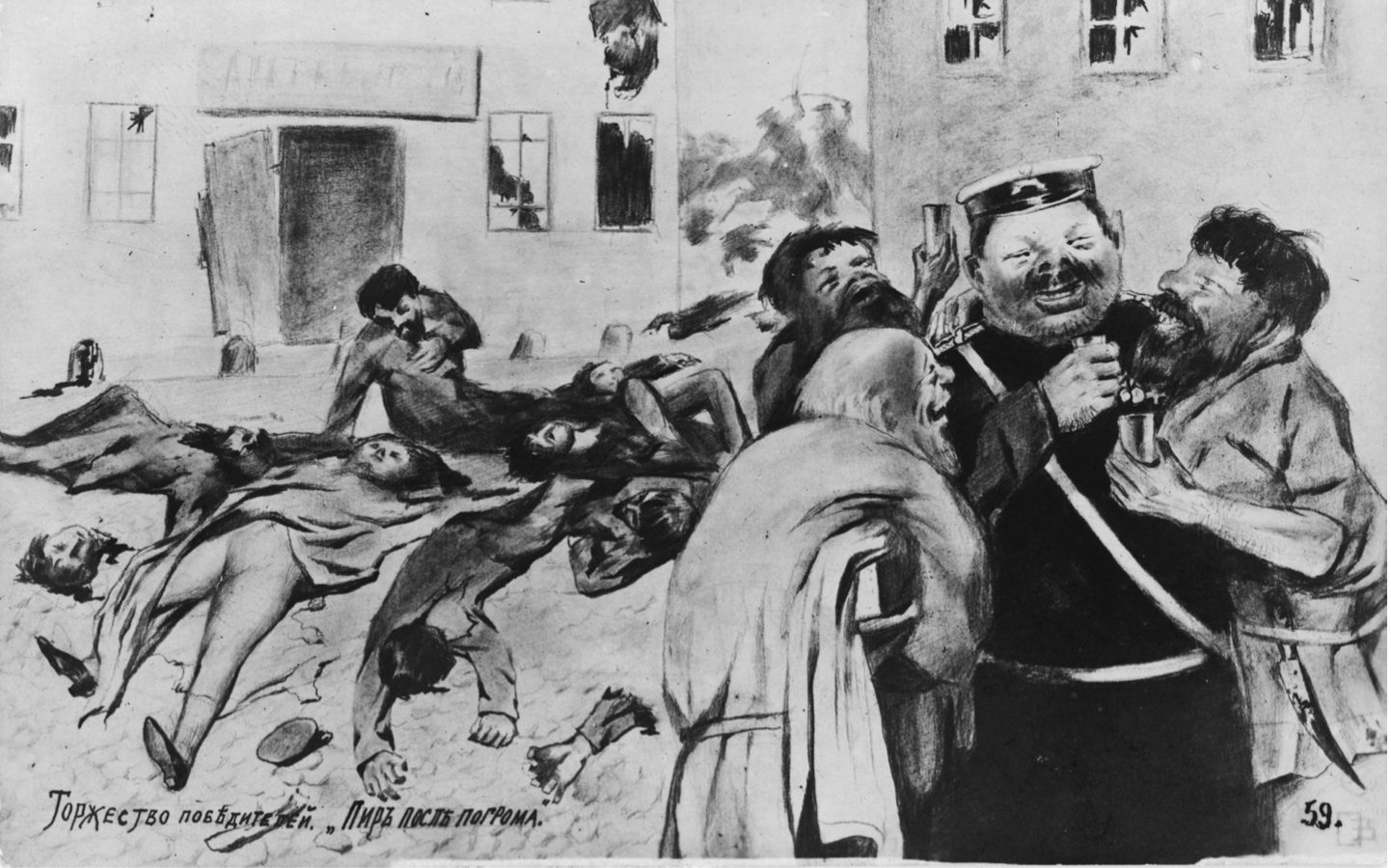
Postcard, ca. 1904–1910, "Triumph of the winners. 'Feast after a pogrom,'" depicting pogromists taking shots of vodka, one possibly wearing a police hat, while mutilated dead bodies and injured people with simian features litter the background. (Blavatnik Archive)

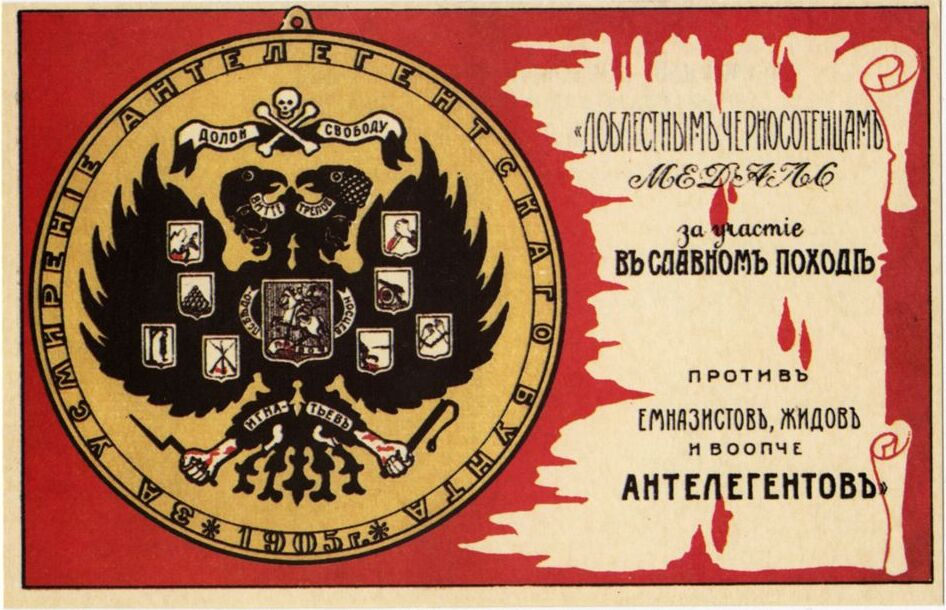
A satirical postcard from 1905 mocking the Black Hundreds depicts the two-headed eagle of the Romanov dynasty and a banner reading "Down with Freedom," while commemorating attacks on "high school students, Kikes, and intellectuals". (Blavatnik Archive)

In the 1897 census, Jews made up 34.41% of the city's population, surpassed only by the ethnic Russian plurality at 45.58%. Other ethnic groups included Ukrainians (9.38%), Poles (4.29%), Germans (2.48%), and Greeks (1.26%).

==== Political polarization in a cosmopolitan port city ====
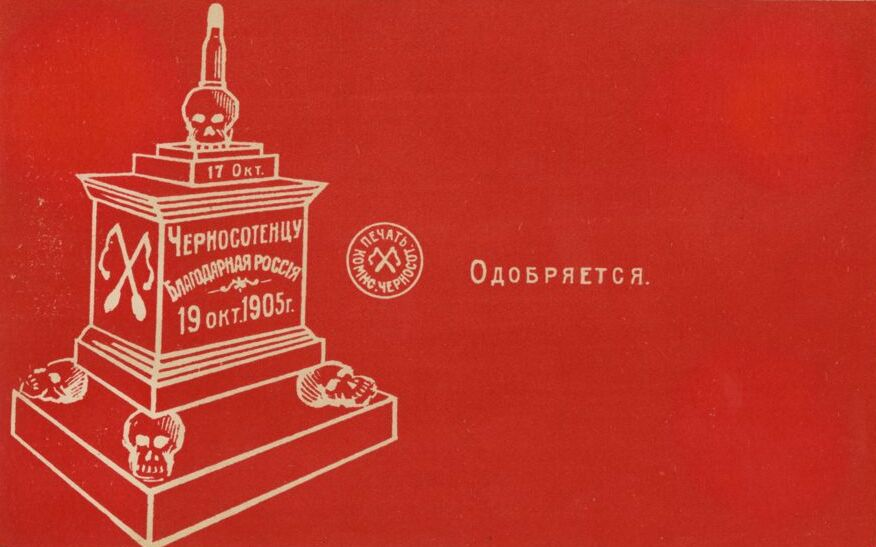
A 1905 red postcard depicts a monument to the Black Hundred with the date October 19, 1905, dedicated by the "grateful Russia", surrounded by skulls and whips used by Cossacks (nagaika). (Blavatnik Archive)

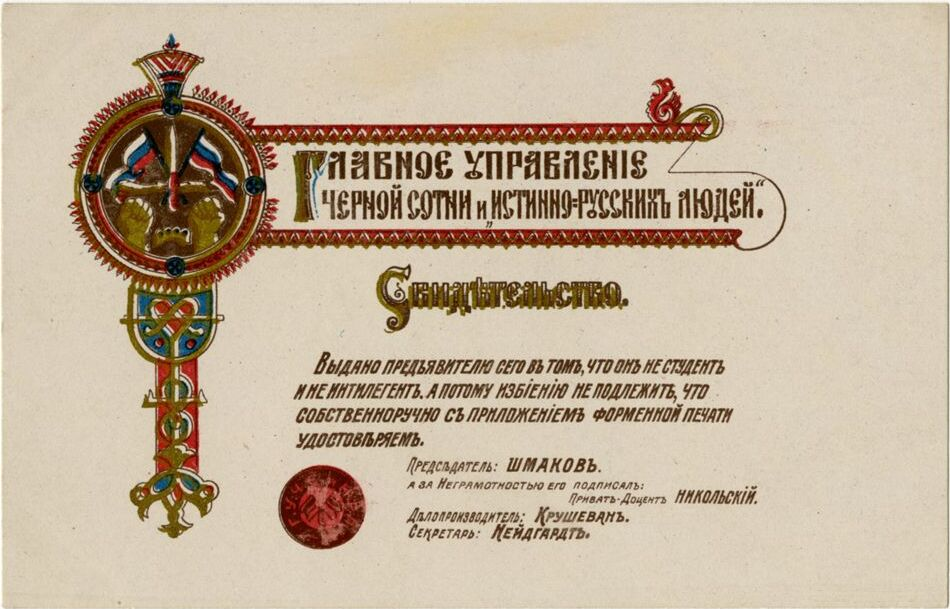
Anti-"Black Hundred" satire. A certificate: "The bearer of this document is neither a student nor a member of the intelligentsia, and is thus not fit for beating" issued by the "Chief Directorate of the Black Hundreds" (Blavatnik Archive)

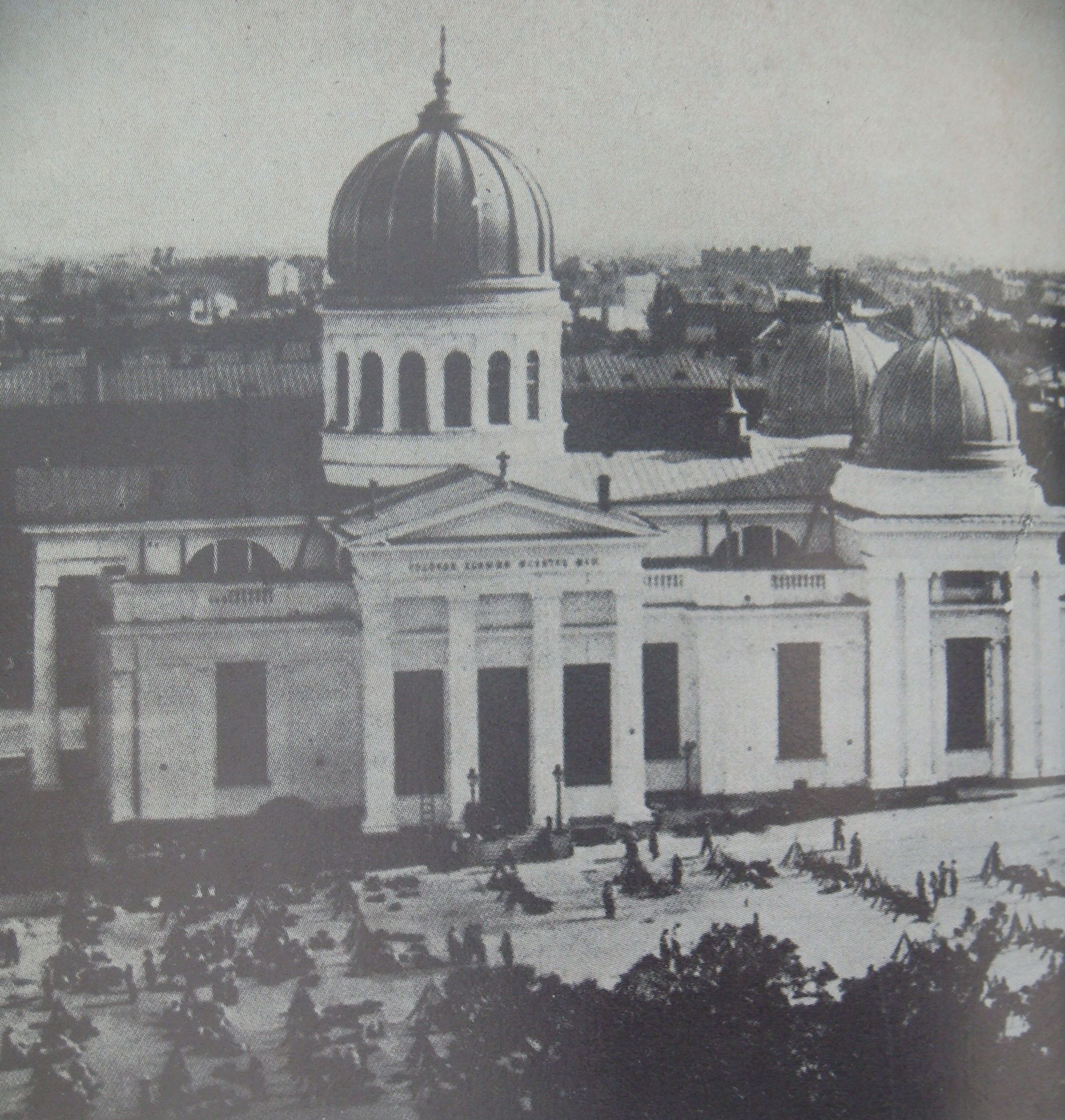
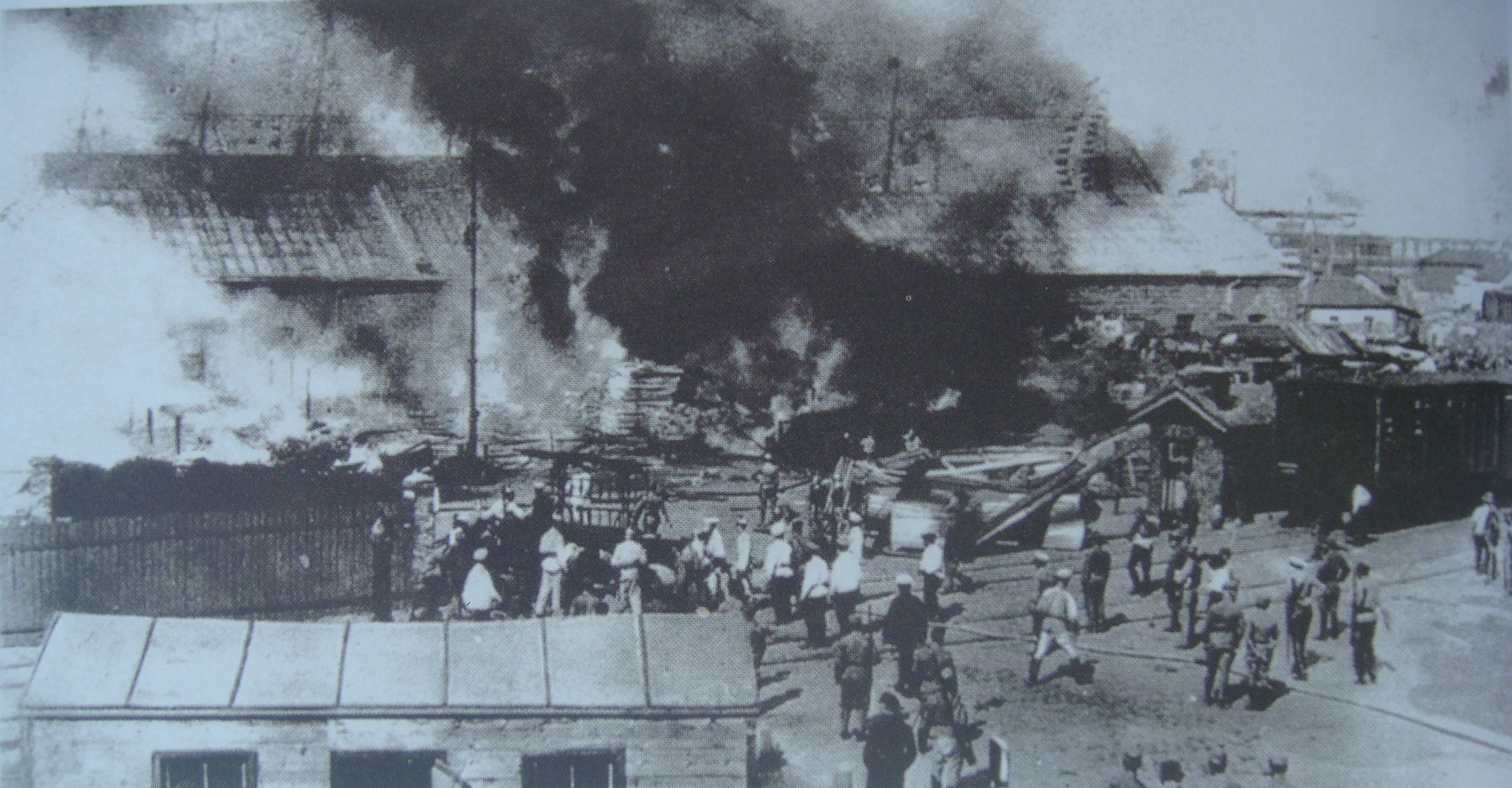
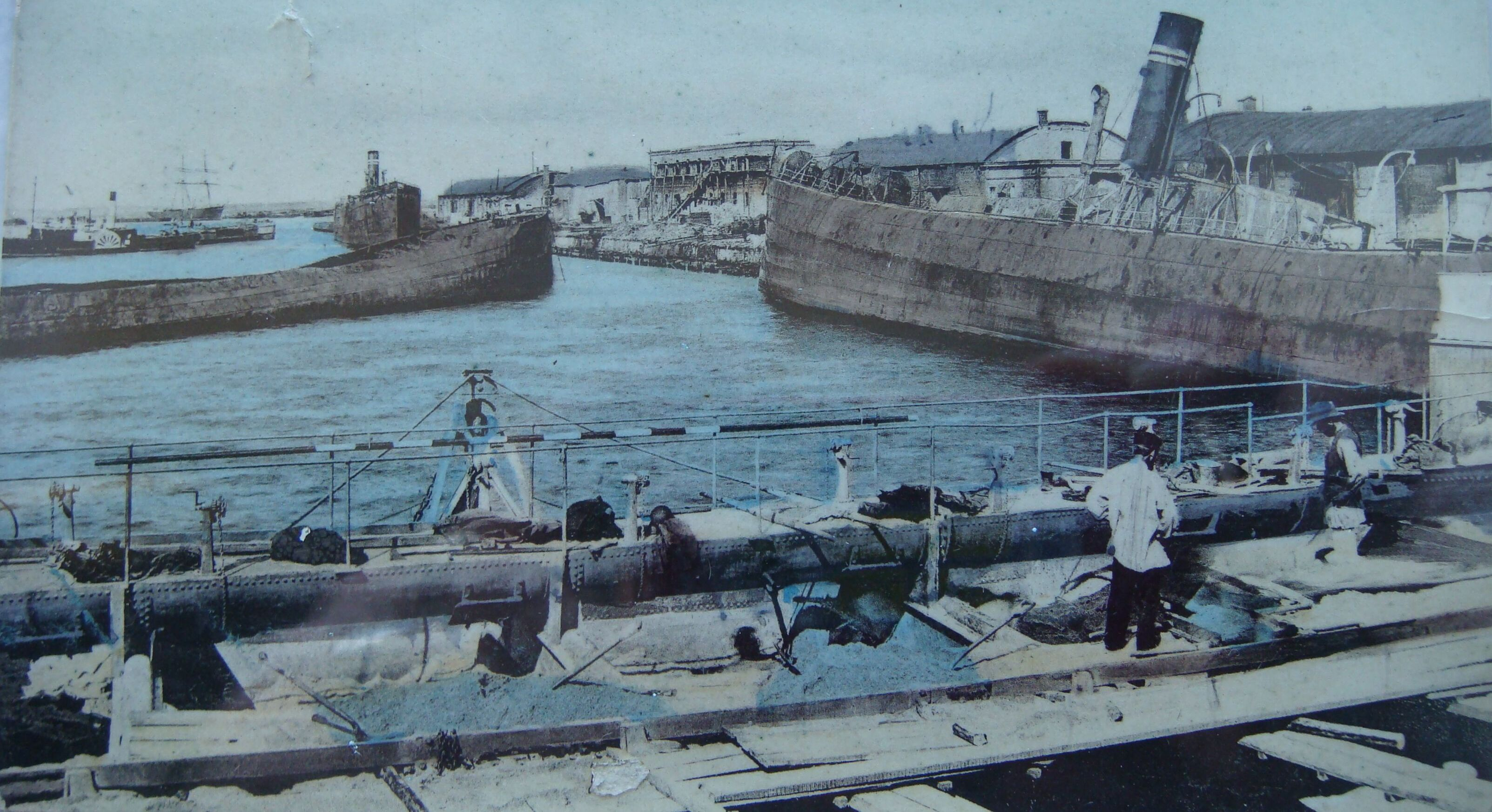
Potemkin mutiny in Odessa. Cossacks bivouacked in Cathedral Square. Mobs burn the port

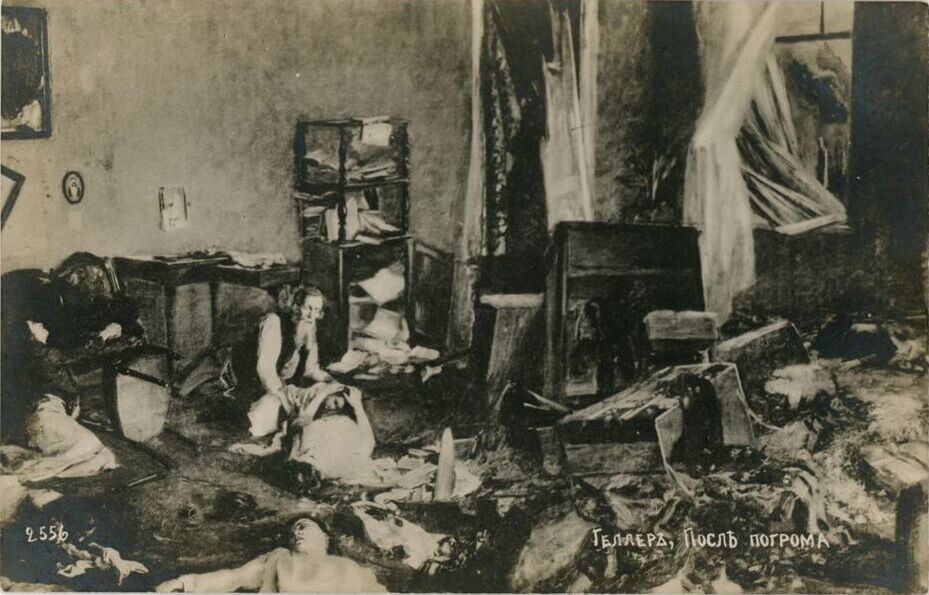
"After a Pogrom", 1907, Petr Isaakovich Geller (born Peisach Itskovich Geller), shows a ransacked room, three dead women and a dead child, and an old man in shock. (Blavatnik Archive)

Popular mobilization and political polarization pervaded Odessa in October, inspiring railroad worker strikes, mutinies, and student organization. Strikes spread to factories, retail, and other industries. High school and university students returning from their summer breaks introduced their parents and teachers to their revolutionary activities, who then let them use lecture halls for organizing. Aimed at the autocracy in general and not a specific employer, the strikes enjoyed popular support, but in public spaces they clashed with Cossacks and the police, who responded with barricades, shootings, injuries, and casualties. Police morale was at a low and they were operating at reduced effectiveness. The military was called in to help when the police could not handle the popular unrest, but in many cases troops were poorly trained and essentially uniformed peasants. They were often disloyal, and conscription for the Russo-Japanese War and the events of the 1905 Revolution contributed to a growth of mutinies in the army and navy. This had the effect that the military, when called to suppress the pogroms, instead frequently contributed to it, joining in the looting and killing despite official policy forbidding troop participation.

Jewish radicalized students and Jewish revolutionaries who had left the city returned to defend their community during the pogroms. Socialist groups such as the Jewish Labor Bund urged the community to emulate Jewish biblical heroes such as David and Joshua and to abandon their passivity and resist the violence and oppression. Jews became associated with revolutionaries in the popular imagination, even though the extent of Jewish revolutionary activity was exaggerated or even fabricated. Some Jewish revolutionaries were arrested for stockpiling homemade bombs, urging Jews to arm themselves for self-defense and join the revolution. Some Jewish youths joined the student strikes and public demonstrations or joined revolutionary parties to organize Jewish self-defense, procuring weapons and forming armed brigades. While this had the effect of saving some Jewish lives, it also fed the perception that Jews were instigators of trouble.

On 17 October, Tsar Nicholas II issued the October Manifesto, which established civil liberties for the people and promised to create an elected assembly. It was reported in Odessa on 18 October, causing celebration in the streets. Jews hoped that the Manifesto would lead to greater freedom and less antisemitism in the Russian Empire. While many Jews and non-Jews in Odessa celebrated the October Manifesto, monarchists disapproved of the document and supported the autocracy.

Contributing to the climate of political polarization in Odessa, pro-tsarist, right-wing organizations, such as the Black Hundreds, consolidated their ranks to counter revolutionary and liberal movements. These groups viewed the anti-government opposition as a threat to the autocracy and Russian national identity. Their newspapers and leaflets blamed minorities such as Poles, Armenians, Georgians, and especially Jews, for the social and political unrest, calling on Russians to "beat the Jews, students and wicked people who seek to harm our Fatherland".

The Black Hundreds explicitly linked their support for the tsar with antisemitism. Their nationalist rallies and marches, like the one that preceded the main pogrom on October 19, enjoyed the tacit blessing of the local authorities, and were used by advocates of the autocracy to support the government and undermine the concessions made as a result of the 1905 revolution. This ideology framed anti-Jewish violence as a way to "strengthen the foundation of tsarist rule" and punish what they perceived as "treasonable behavior" such as desecrating portraits of the tsar or forcing bystanders to pay tribute to revolutionary flags. Despite official denials, the presence of these groups raised the level of violence considerably. Inadequate policing contributed to the rise of the far-right. "Riot specialists", some of whom enjoyed official support, opportunistically exploited tensions to channel violence toward Jews. The tsar also provided funds to the extremist groups.

Fear of a pogrom in April 1905 prompted the National Committee of Jewish Self-Defense to urge Jews to arm themselves and protect their property to try to deter potential pogromists by threatening to fight back. Although a pogrom did not take place until October, fear of one re-emerged in June when Jews were declared culpable for instigating shootings as well as fires at the port. On 13 June 1905, Cossacks shot several striking workers. The next day, large groups of workers stopped working and attacked police with rocks and guns. The battleship Potemkin, whose crew had mutinied on 14 June, arrived in Odessa that evening. Thousands of Odessans went to the port to see the battleship and support the mutinous sailors. During the afternoon of 15 June, the unruly crowd began to raid warehouses and set fire to wooden buildings in the harbor. Chaos ensued when the military tried to suppress the unrest by cordoning off the harbor and shooting at the trapped crowd. The strikes, disorder, and the arrival of Potemkin resulted in the deaths of nearly 2,000 people at the Port of Odessa. An antisemitic pamphlet called Odesskie dni ("Odessan Days") was distributed soon after the violence at the harbor, falsely accusing Jews of responsibility for the tragedy. Odesskie dni demanded restitution from Jews, disarmament, and a general search of Jewish residences. Although the events of June did not immediately cause a pogrom, the antisemitic environment had been intensified, setting the stage. In addition to the antisemitic press, police and government officials blamed Jews for the fires and strikes. During the Potemkin incident, Odessa was placed under martial law by commander of Odessa's military garrison, Alexander von Kaulbars, and lifted in August despite Odessa city governor, D. M. Neidhart's opposition. The government gave universities autonomy, which intensified their political activism, and Neidhart's petition for further powers was turned down by the government, which he later cited as an excuse for his slow action.

==== Antisemitic attitudes and the Russian ruling class ====
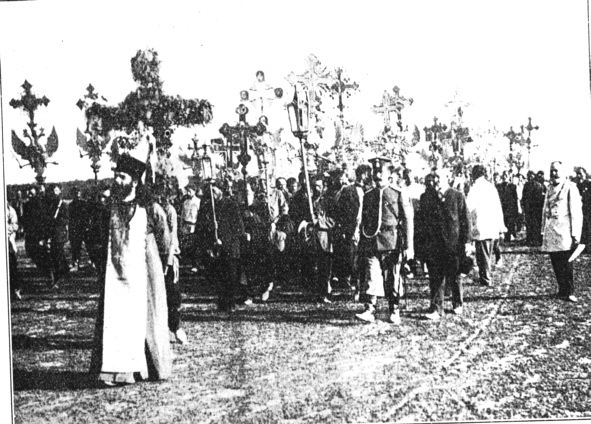
A Black Hundred procession from 1907 bearing large crosses

Antisemitism was common in the nobility and socially acceptable, and the tsar was said to make antisemitic statements, such as "Nine-tenths of the troublemakers are Jews, the people’s whole anger turned against them. That is how the pogroms happened", though there was a distinction between official and unofficial participation in right-wing movements. The tsar exhibited leniency toward organizations like the Black Hundreds and encouraged "patriots", often granting clemency to pogromists; he supported 1,713 petitions while only refusing 78. A.V. Kaulbars, commander of Odessa's military garrison, became a leader in the Union of the Russian People, a far-right antisemitic monarchist group. "Patriotic" demonstrations, organized by local authorities, police, and the Black Hundreds, were a precursor to pogroms. Police provided demonstrators with patriotic flags and images of the tsar, and acted as support, along with the military, for the pogromists. Troops, police, and Orthodox priests accompanied the processions. The antisemitic Black Hundreds had close connections to the authorities. These ultra-nationalist, monarchist, chauvinist organizations had support of local authorities to suppress revolutionary activity. Their goal was shared with the tsar to crush the revolutionary movement. S. An-sky wrote that the pogroms "were all organized by the government with the single goal of putting out the revolutionary fire with Jewish blood." The purpose of the pogroms was to use Jews as a scapegoat and deter them from revolutionary activity.

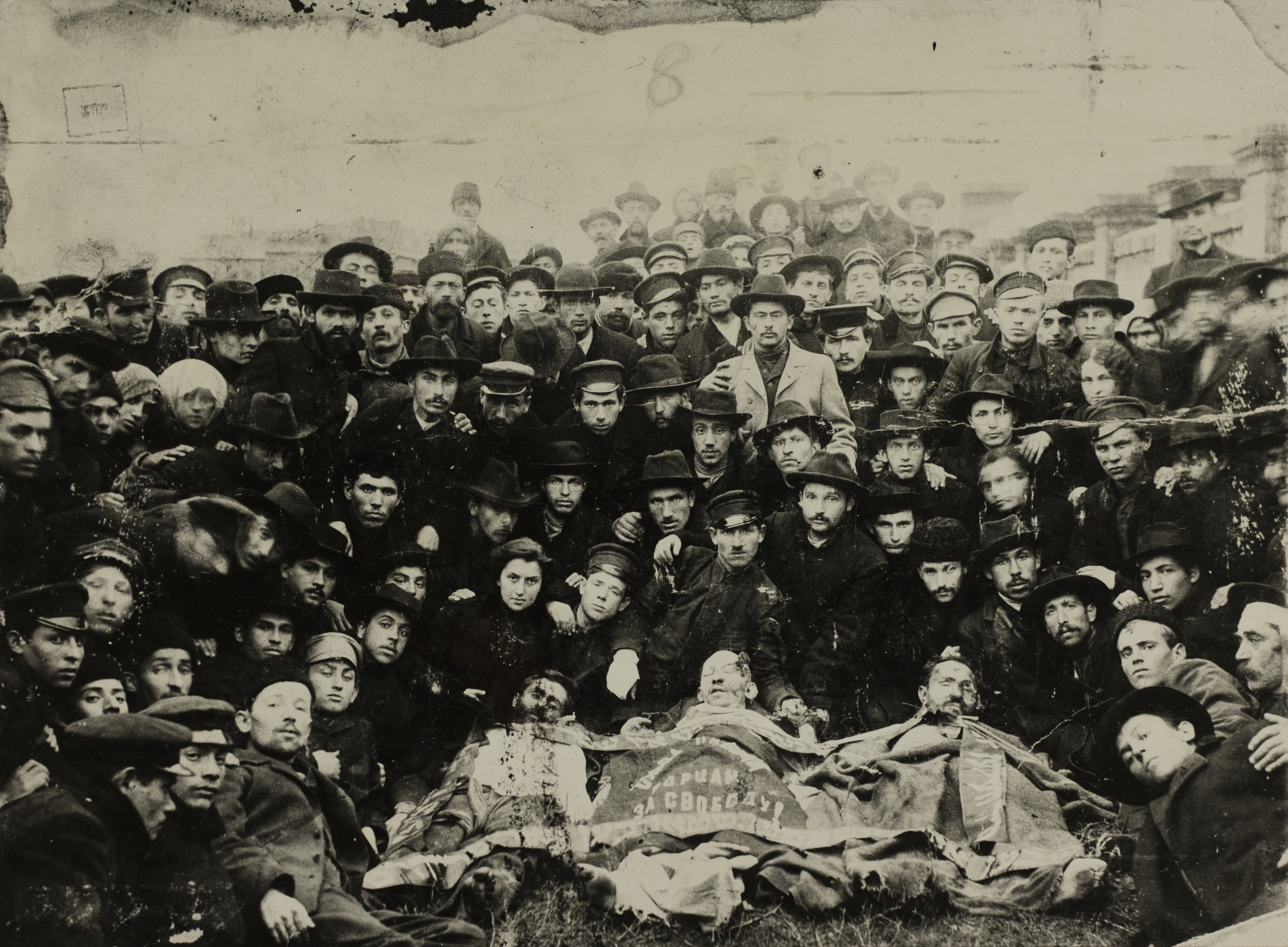
Members of a Bundist self-defense group with bodies of their comrades killed in Odessa during the pogrom in 1905 (YIVO)

The tsar and his ministers fostered an attitude of antisemitism and the perception that they unofficially condoned or tolerated actions against Jews. Some ministers, such as Witte and Pyotr Sviatopolk-Mirsky, advocated for restraint of the pogromists, and reform including loosening restrictions on, or a path to emancipation for, Russian Jews, but many supported a trend of repression. Discriminatory legislation, e.g. the May Laws, that restricted Jews also contributed to their image as not to be trusted. While the tsar's government did not actually sponsor pogroms, they encouraged and subsidized antisemitism, increased conflict between Jews and gentiles, and worsened the conditions of Jews while blaming them for their misfortunes. Lower level officials explicitly encouraged and participated in antisemitic activities, believing they were accomplishing the tsar's wishes. Vyacheslav von Plehve, Minister of the Interior, may have harbored antisemitic attitudes, which is the subject of debate, but he certainly expressed some negative sentiments toward the Russian Jews. A diary entry from Aleksey Kuropatkin in 1903 states, "I heard from Plehve as well as from the tsar that the Jews needed to be given a lesson, that they had become arrogant, and that they were leading the revolutionary movement." Prince Urusov was told by Plehve to be "less Judeophilic". In 1903, Plehve received a delegation from Odessa concerned about the news of the pogrom in Kishinev.

Tell the Jewish youth, your sons and your daughters, tell your entire intelligentsia, they should not think that Russia is an old, decaying and disintegrating body; young and developing Russia will overcome the revolutionary movement. The fear of the Jews is much talked about, but this is not true. The Jews are the most courageous of people. In Western Russia some 90 percent of the revolutionaries are Jews, and in Russia generally – some 40 percent. I shall not conceal from you that the revolutionary movement in Russia worries us ... but you should know that if you do not deter your youth from the revolutionary movement, we shall make your position untenable to such an extent that you will have to leave Russia, to the very last man!

Practically every segment of the Christian population participated in anti-Jewish agitation and the pogroms, including Greek grain monopolists, wealthy Russian merchants, nationalist Ukrainian intellectuals, liberal professions, government employees, and vagrants. Many of the unskilled day laborers, temporary migrants in gangs or artels, were sufferers of deadly hunger, alcoholism, and lived in poor conditions in flophouses. There was an underlying tension beneath their peaceful appearance which became fury in bad economic times. They engaged in labor activism, strikes, and became restive facing high unemployment, though economic factors alone do not explain why they targeted Jews in 1905. This was presaged by attacks during the Boxer Rebellion in 1900. Popular and official antisemitism was a pervasive part of the social fabric.

Evidence exists that during the 1905 pogrom, the army supported the mob. Osip Pyatnitsky, a Bolshevik revolutionary who was an eyewitness in Odessa, recounted:

There I saw the following scene: a gang of young men, between 25 and 20 years old, among whom there were plain-clothes policemen and members of the Okhrana, were rounding up anyone who looked like a Jew—men, women and children—stripping them naked and beating them mercilessly... We immediately organised a group of revolutionaries armed with revolvers... we ran up to them and fired at them. They ran away. But suddenly between us and the pogromists there appeared a solid wall of soldiers, armed to the teeth and facing us. We retreated. The soldiers went away, and the pogromists came out again. This happened a few times. It became clear to us that the pogromists were acting together with the military.

Sergei Witte wrote that he tried to get the tsar to stop the pogroms, but the tsar was silent, or blamed the Jews, and that the pogroms enjoyed support from the top. Witte, who publicly condemned the violence, said that Dmitri Feodorovich Trepov was a dictator who encouraged pogroms.

==== Economic antisemitism ====
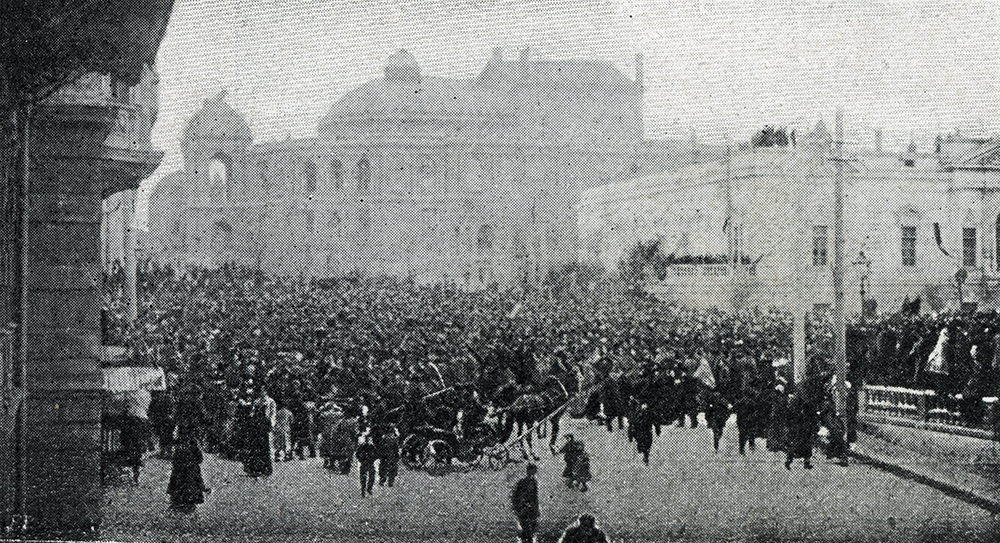
Crowd gathering on the street in Odessa, 1905. Je sais tout

Growing antisemitism and resentment triggered by the changing place of Jews in Odessa's economy helped create an environment conducive to violence. Better-off Odessan Jews held a prominent place in trade and finance, forming a majority of the banking, moneylending, and moneychanging industries and a significant involvement in commerce. They were also represented in fields such as the intelligentsia and as artists, though not a majority. They were underrepresented as city workers, which were majority Christian. After the Crimean War disrupted trade routes, many Greek companies relocated due to bankruptcy or a search for more profitable bases of operation. Jewish merchants successfully expanded their businesses to fill the void in the grain trade previously monopolized by Greeks. By 1886 firms owned by Jews controlled 70 percent, and by 1910, Jewish firms controlled nearly 90 percent of the grain export trade. Many factors contributed to the spread of antisemitism in Odessa including the success of Jewish traders. Like other groups at that place and time, Jews often gave preference to other Jews in employment. There were also rumors that Jews had desecrated the Greek Orthodox Church and cemetery, inciting the participation of Greek sailors and dockworkers in the pogroms, and fueling antisemitic attitudes.

The pogroms also coincided with economic and political factors. The 1905 event was similar to previous pogroms, but worsened by these catalysts. Economic grievances took place between lower class workers rather than wealthy merchants. The Russo-Japanese War caused a major downturn that restricted trading, reduced industrial production, and led to high unemployment. Jewish industrialists were blamed for layoffs during the recession, and were accused of disloyalty, and being unpatriotic, for not supporting the war, or for participating in the labor movement. This was worsened by Interior Minister Ignat'ev passing the discriminatory May Laws, which made Jews effectively second-class citizens.

Local officials' delayed responses to pogroms reflected their opinion of Jews as subversive radicals who deserved their lot, and the belief that the imperial government would look kindly on their actions to "punish" "disloyal" Jewish Odessans. Right-wing extremists painted Jews as subversive socialist leaders. Friends and defenders of Jewish Odessa existed among the liberal bourgeoisie and in academia, but not enough to help them.

The perception of Jews as an economic threat fueled Russian participation in the pogroms, and encouraged Russians to scapegoat Jews for their problems. Many Russians, facing limited employment opportunities and lower wages, became frustrated and believed they were being exploited by the growing Jewish population. They blamed Jewish population growth in Odessa, which increased from 14% (14,000 of 100,000) in 1858 to 35% (140,000 of 400,000) in 1897. They developed a largely incorrect perception that Jews possessed great wealth and power due to their growing influence on certain industries, particularly in commercial trades. Jewish-owned brokerage houses grew to manage the majority of the city's export trade. 13 of the 18 banks that operated in Odessa had Jewish board members and directors. Approximately half the members of the city's three merchant guilds were Jewish. Jews made up 83% of the banking and 87% of the credit industry, were successful in distilling, tobacco, timber, and made up 66.2% of merchants, and 90% of intermediary brokers and agents. In the 1890s the liquor trade became a state monopoly, leading to Russians outnumbering Jews in that industry. After the 1880s, government restriction on Jewish occupations, settlement, and trade increased competition in urban trade and employment.

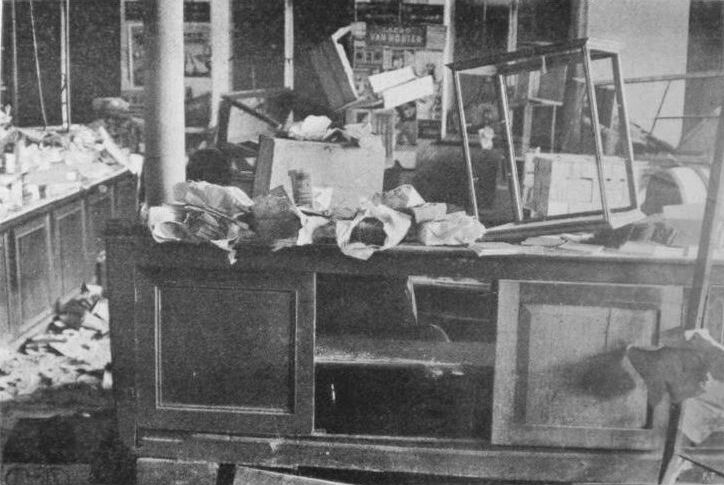
Postcard, shop of Rabinovich after pogrom of Odessa in 1905

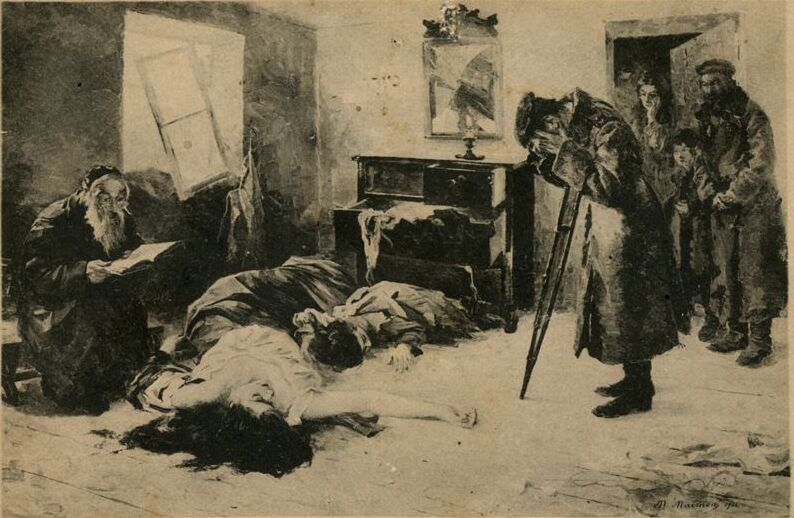
"Return to the Homeland," 1906, M. Maimon, shows a Jewish soldier returning home to find his wife and child murdered in a pogrom, and his home plundered. (Blavatnik Archive)

Although by the end of the 19th century, upwardly mobile Jews had made inroads in manufacturing and trade, the majority of wealth and power in Odessa still belonged to Christians. Jews certainly did not dominate the economy of Odessa, nor did they control Odessa politically. While some Jewish-owned firms were successful, the majority of Jews in Odessa were impoverished. The perception that the growing Jewish capitalist population was "exploiting" Russians was exaggerated in the popular belief. Odessa's population growth levelled off in 1897, and the majority of enterprises under factory inspection in Odessa were owned by foreigners and Russians, who employed primarily Russian workers. In 1911, Jews owned 17 percent of real estate parcels, while non-Jews controlled about half of large enterprises. Most Jews barely made ends meet as shopkeepers, second-hand dealers, salesclerks, petty traders, domestic servants, day laborers, workshop employees, and factory hands. A 1902 study estimated that almost 50,000 Jews were destitute, another 30,000 lived under the poverty line, and in 1905, nearly 80,000 Jews needed financial aid to purchase matzah for Passover, indicating that considerably more than half of Odessa's Jews were living in poverty. Some estimates suggest between 30 and 35% of Jews depended on welfare relief, and the community in Odessa had to pay for the burials of 63% of its dead. Benjamin Nathans calls this inequality in the Pale of Settlement, with a small but increasing number of Jews integrating into the white-collar world, "two Russian Jewries".

More affluent Jews were also not able to transform their relative wealth into greater political power. Of the 3449 total staff of the imperial government, only 71 were Jews. After an 1892 civic reform, Jews lost the right to elect representatives to city councils. Instead, a special municipal affairs office took over, appointing Jews to six allotted seats, which capped their representation as a fixed percentage of the sixty-person Odessa City Council, disenfranchising them and depriving them of their right to elect representatives proportionally. (Note: "Furthermore, wealthy Jews could not enter the leisured propertied class or translate their wealth into political influence. Only a handful of Odessa's Jews worked for the Imperial government, the judiciary or the municipal administration.10 Contrary to popular perceptions prevalent among many non-Jews both in Odessa and throughout Russia, Odessa was not controlled by its Jewish residents. Indeed, they were disenfranchised after 1892, when the central government deprived Jews of the right to elect representatives to the city council and limited Jewish representation to six appointed members of the sixty-man council.")

=== Outbreak of violence ===
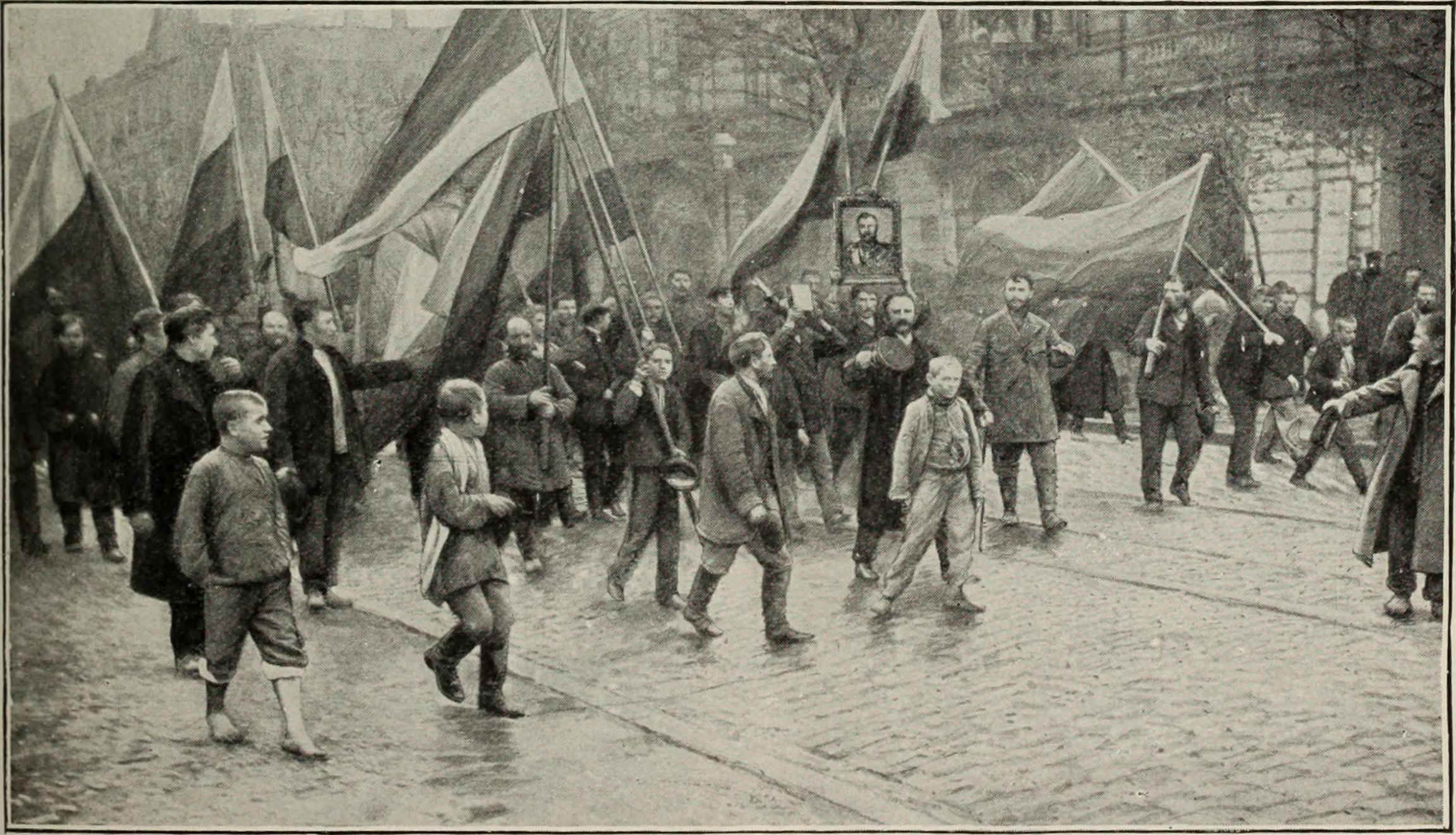
Monarchists, with children leading, marching in the street of Odessa, carrying a picture of the tsar and waving Russian flags in 1905. The Illustrated London News

On October 14, high school students skipped classes to join rallies taking place at the university, but were stopped by saber-wielding police, who wounded several. This led to anger and indignation toward the authorities from the liberal community, and calls for a citizen's militia to replace the police. The authorities closed the university to student organizing meetings. This further radicalized the crowd.

The next day, radical students and revolutionaries armed themselves and encouraged other workers to lend them support. About 4000 workers, including many Jews, went on strike. On October 16, students took to the streets and attempted to erect barricades. Several were killed by the police, others taken to Jewish hospital wounded, and one policeman was also killed. Although a public funeral had been planned for the students, the Odessa city governor, D. M. Neidhart, seized the bodies and had them buried secretly to limit rallying around the deaths. On October 17 the October Manifesto was promulgated. Neidhart posted placards against the radical organizing at the university. The university rector asked for protection from the military but did not receive it. Neidhart denied requests to arm a citizen's militia, and ordered the police off the streets, supposedly for their own protection, and didn't ask Kaul'bars for any help either, leaving Odessa's Jews vulnerable.

The news of the October Manifesto inspired marching in the streets in Odessa's Jewish and liberal communities to celebrate their new freedoms. Red flags and a desecrated image of the tsar outraged the monarchists, who began to take out their anger on Odessa's Jewish community, whom they viewed as the source of Russia's problems. When a group of Jews demanded Russian workers doff their caps to red flags celebrating the October Manifesto, a fight broke out on the streets and soon turned into a full-fledged pogrom, with Russians indiscriminately attacking Jews and looting Jewish homes and businesses.

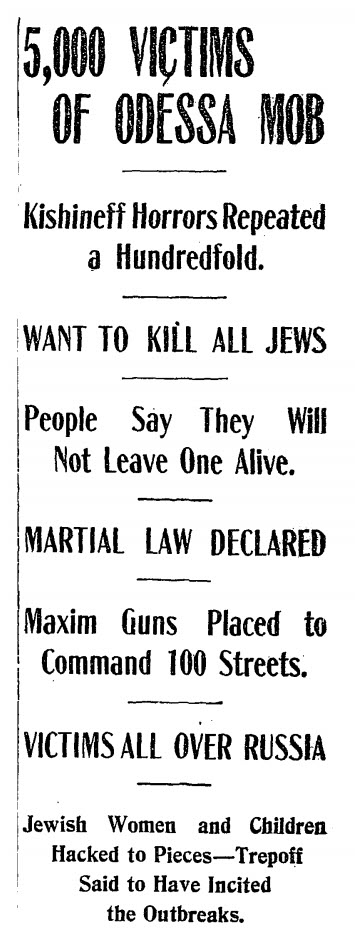
1905 New York Times headline

On October 19, hundreds of Russians marched in patriotic and religious marches displaying their loyalty to the tsar. Organizers handed out flags, icons, and images of the tsar as participants sang the national anthem and religious hymns, and according to some reports, "Down with the Jews; they need a beating". The patriotic marchers, many of whom were unskilled day laborers, particularly dockworkers, as well as factory and construction workers, shopowners, clerks, workshop employees, and vagrants, were not all politically motivated. Some were reportedly enticed by the vodka, guns, and money handed out by plainclothes policemen. Violence re-erupted with the shooting and bombing of a demonstration, possibly by revolutionaries or Jewish and student self-defense brigades.

After shots from surrounding buildings killed a young boy carrying an icon, the pogrom erupted. Although the perpetrators remain uncertain, revolutionaries or members of Jewish and student self-defense brigades are thought to have fired shots and reportedly threw homemade bombs, triggering a panic. The patriotic crowd, convinced that Jews were responsible, began shouting "Beat the Kikes" and "Death to the Kikes", kicking off a violent rampage. Pogromists fired more shots from rooftops and balconies, further escalating the situation. In turn, Jewish self-defense brigades fired on Russians holding smaller processions and further inflamed pogromist retaliation. The violence raged until October 22. This pogrom became the most destructive anti-Jewish incident in Russian history at the time, exceeding the 1881–1882 pogrom wave. The attackers committed atrocities including brutally beating, mutilating, and murdering defenseless Jewish people, threw Jews out of windows, raping women and slaughtering infants in front of their families. The rioters killed pregnant women giving birth along with their midwives in a maternity hospital and attempted to rape others. A little under 10% of the deaths were women, four of whom were among the self-defense brigades.

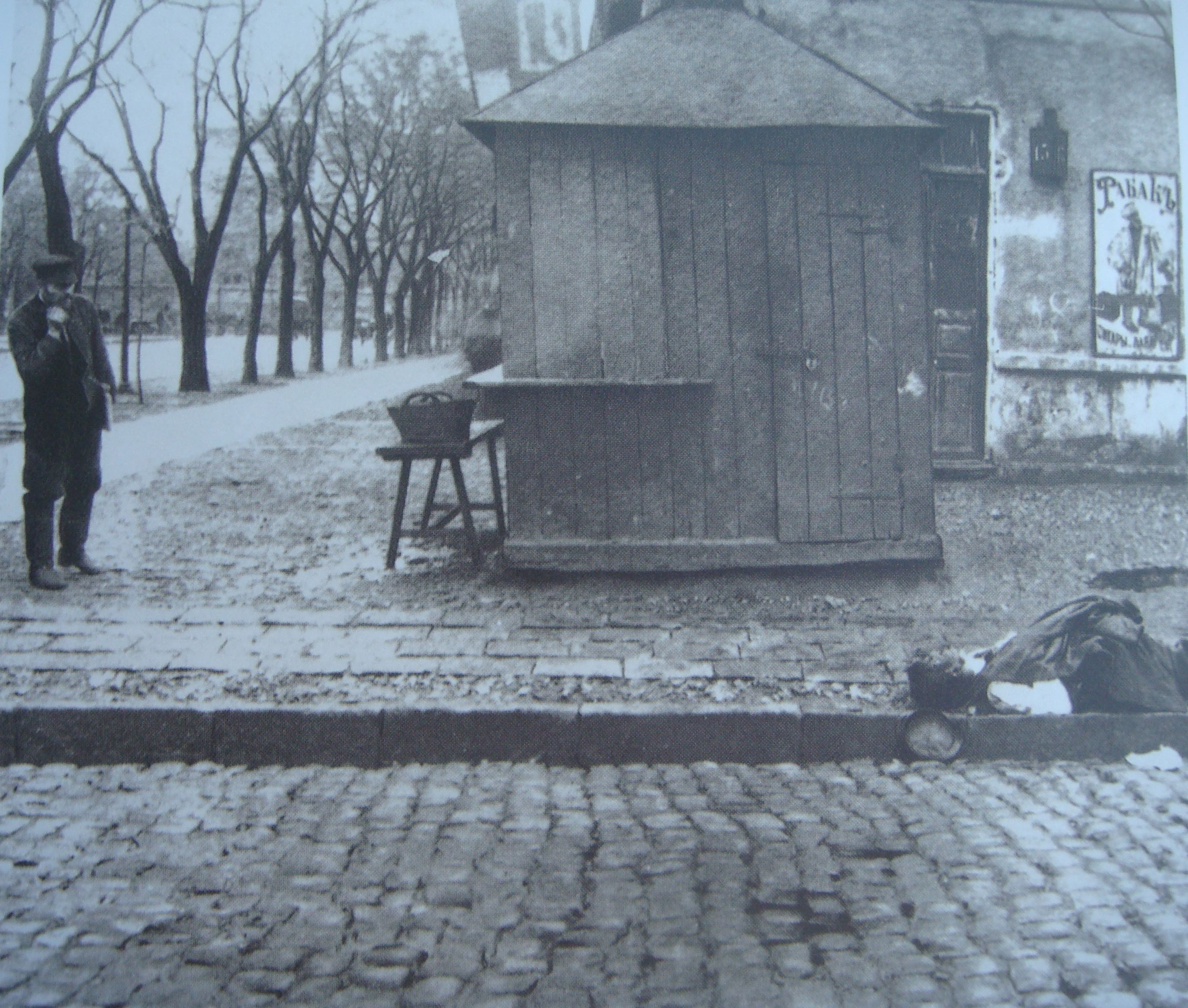
Odessa 1905. After the clashes.

The American consul to Russia sent a telegraph back home: "the Russians attacked the Jews in every part of town and a massacre ensued. From Tuesday till Saturday was terrible and horrible. The Russians lost heavily also, but the number of killed and wounded is not known. The police without uniform were very prominent." The worst rioting took place October 19–21. The violence spread from the city center to the suburbs and nearby villages. The rioters were well-organized and targeted neighborhoods with contingents of pogromists proportional to their size. Rather than working to protect Jews and restore order, plainclothes policemen and soldiers looked on or joined in the massacre. Though they suffered many casualties and ultimately were vanquished, Jewish self-defense forces successfully defended some neighborhoods.

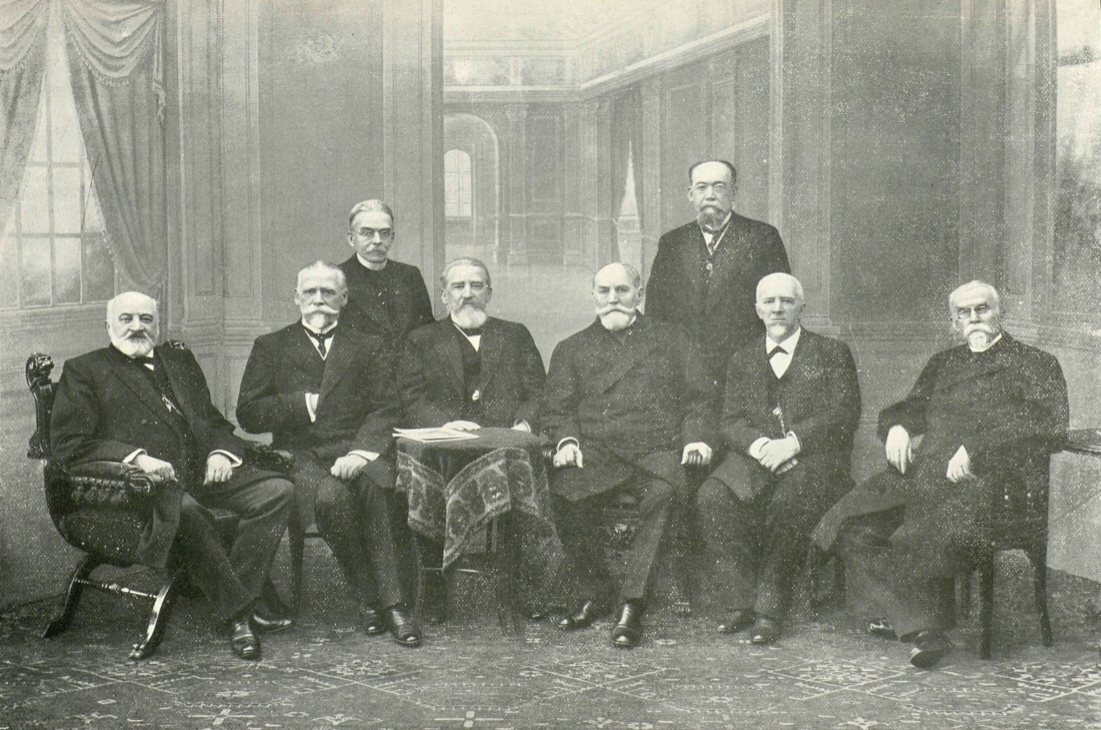
Russian Senate presiding officers, 1912, Kuzminsky 2nd from the left

==== Neidhardt, Kaul'bars, and the Kuzminskii investigation ====
On 21 October, after much of the pogrom was over, the city governor Dmitri Neidhardt, and the commander of the Odessa military garrison, A. V. Kaul'bars, appeared in the streets. They instructed the rioters to disperse and go home. Neidhart's and Kaul'bars' prior inaction became a controversy, and led to Neidhart's resignation, though he was not otherwise reprimanded. Neither took any decisive action to suppress the pogrom quickly. Senator A.M. Kuzminskii, who was appointed to investigate the causes of the Odessa pogrom, conducted an official inquiry that faulted Neidgart for 'malfeasance in office' and for creating a situation where the city was left defenseless, by ordering the police to withdraw from their posts. Kaul'bars did not order his troops to shoot at pogromists until October 20, after the pogrom had been raging for two days. Kaulbars claimed he needed written orders and that Neidgart didn't provide them swiftly. Both Kaul'bars and Neidgart defended the provocative behavior of the police and military, accusing Jewish and student militias of hampering their efforts to contain the pogrom. Some police and soldiers were actively participating in the violence, condoning the destruction of Jewish property, and even directing mobs and providing protection for pogromists or for non-Jewish properties. Neidhart only rode through the city once, with an escort, on the fourth day of rioting, when things were calming down. The police on duty were afraid for their lives and sat in the station, and Neidhart refused to return them to their posts, writing in an announcement that they could return only if ten citizens would stand next to each policeman. He told individuals who requested protection to hide inside the university.

Kuzminsky collected testimony that indicated that both opponents and defenders of the autocracy were to blame for the escalation of violence. The report also presented evidence that policemen and soldiers participated in the violence against Jews. From his point of view, this was an understandable response, as he believed that Jewish revolutionaries were responsible for the civil and political unrest, and that Jewish armed self-defense units that confronted pogromists and even fired on policemen and soldiers who were encouraging the mobs. Kuzminsky, like Neidgart and Kaul'bars, and other authorities, blamed the pogrom on political events and considered them spontaneous, but this is questionable. Authorities were accused of encouraging the pogromists. Kuzminskii's own investigation uncovered evidence of police complicity in planning the counter-demonstration and ensuing violence. A soldier named L. D. Teplitskii testified that as early as October 15–16, policemen were discussing using force against Jews. One told him, "Jews want freedom—well, we'll kill two or three thousand. Then they'll know what freedom is." Teplitskii also testified that on the morning of October 18, he met day laborers who said they had been instructed to attack Jews that evening at a police station. Furthermore, policemen were reported to have compiled lists of Jewish-owned businesses and apartments, and agitators reportedly went from house to house, in an effort to incite residents, spreading rumors that Jews were murdering Russian families. There is also evidence suggesting that police were instructed not to interfere with pogromists. An army captain informed Kuzminskii that a policeman told him that their superiors had granted permission to beat Jews for three days because they had destroyed the tsar's portrait in the municipal duma.

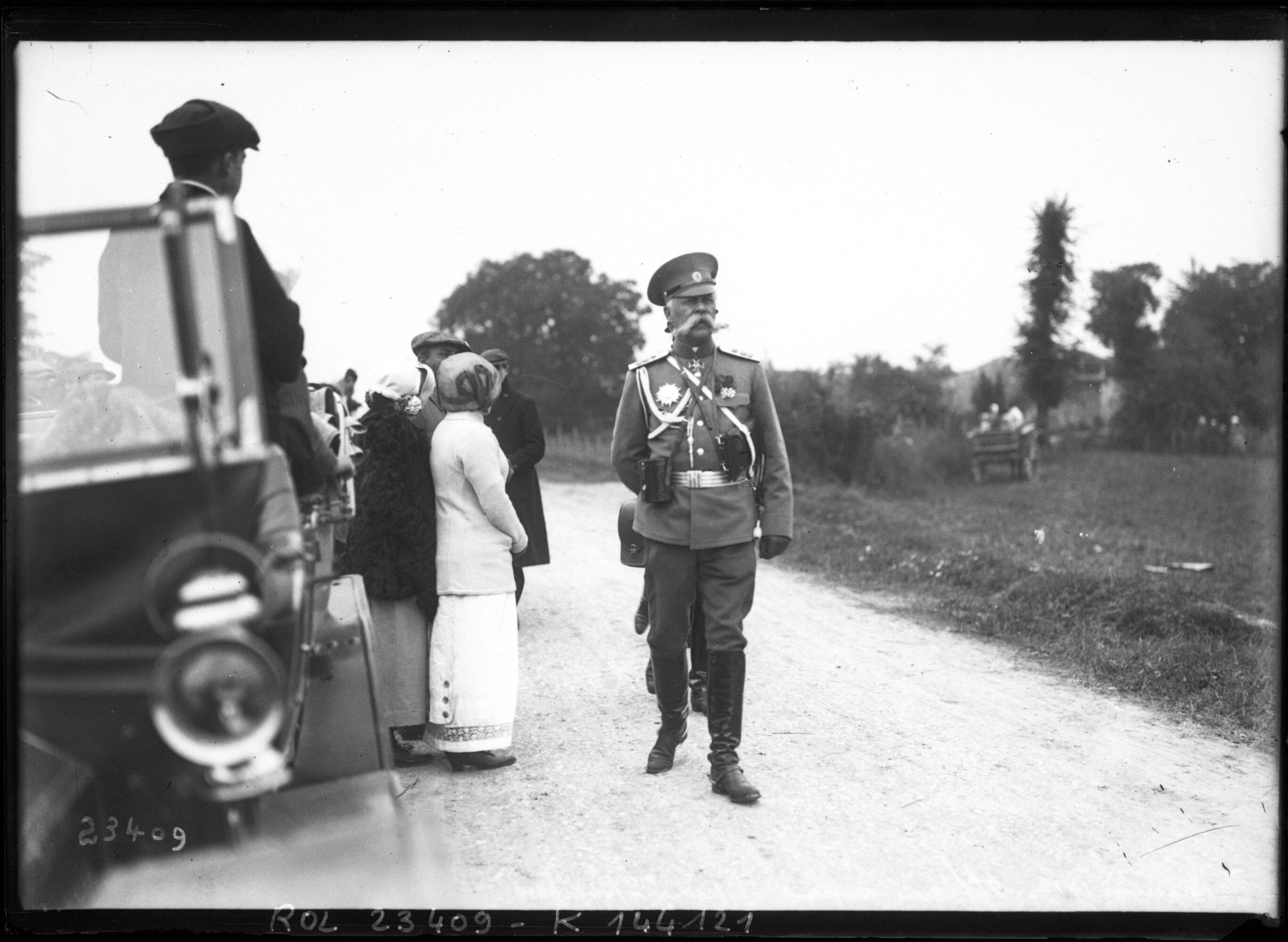
Photo of Kaulbars, 1912

However, no evidence ties Neidgart, who was likely trying to avert a major violent event, to the planning of the pogrom. Neidgart even requested that Kaul'bars cancel a funeral procession to honor students killed on October 16, fearing an eruption of violence. Still, though, Neidgart delayed intervening even when community leaders such as a rabbi and a banker begged for his help. Neidgart may have simply realized his police force was disgruntled, underpaid, understaffed and out of his control. He may have realized he could not rely on his police force, and only sought help from Kaul'bars after the pogrom had grown too large for student self-defense units to manage. He sympathized with the mob and blamed the Jews, reportedly telling Jewish leaders, "You wanted freedom. Well, now you're getting 'Jewish freedom'". From his perspective, Jews were responsible for the city's problems, and the pogrom a form of retribution. While there is no evidence that Neidgart planned the pogrom or had prior knowledge of it, he did sympathize with the mob's actions and may have seen the attacks on Jews as a way to "squelch the revolution." Kaul'bars also did not act decisively to restore order, and ignored reports that his forces were participating in the pogrom, and on the 21 stated, "all of us sympathize in our souls with the pogrom." Still, he acknowledged later that despite their personal sympathies, he, the police and the military had a responsibility to restore order and protect the Jews. For Neidhart, the anti-government forces to counter and the Jews were difficult to distinguish.

Pyotr Nikolayevich Durnovo defended Neidgart, writing, "people such as... Neidgardt never could nor should have criminal proceedings instituted against them, because they acted according to the interests and directions of the government, and were valid proponents of its will."

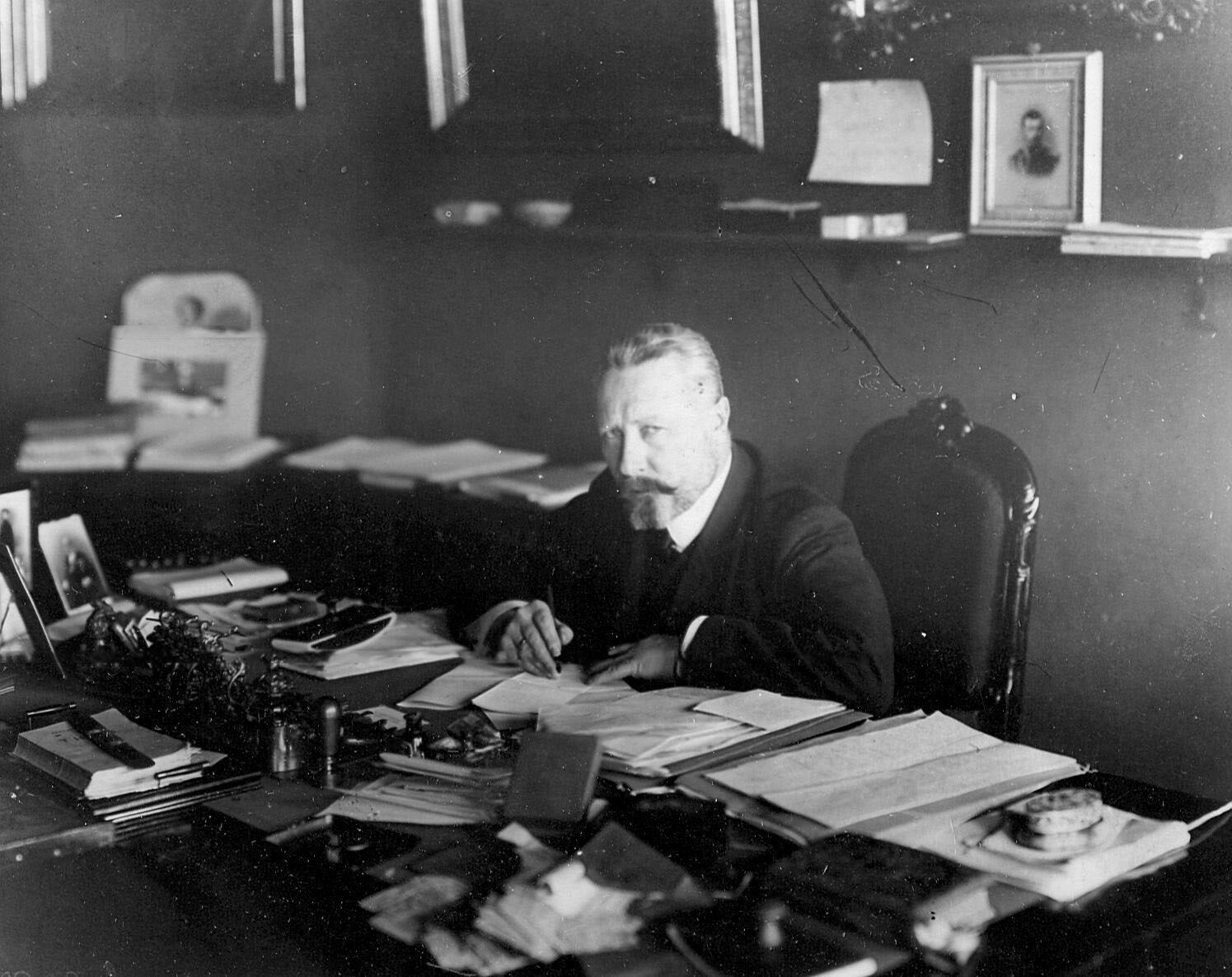
Neidhardt in 1911

According to a subsequent account written by the British Consul to Odessa, Charles Stewart Smith, Neidhart had ordered the police to withdraw from the streets, allowing the mobs a free hand to murder, rape and pillage. Stewart Smith addressed to M. Neidhart a forceful protest, calling upon him to stop the pogrom and recall the police to their duties. The French Consul-General wrote to him as well. The next day the pogrom subsided. "It is quite clear", Stewart Smith reported to the Foreign Office, "that the late disorders were prepared and worked by the police who openly superintended the work of destruction, looting and murder". A few weeks later he wrote: "There were hopes that there would be a real judicial investigation of the whole affair, with proper apportionment of blame; but the Emperor has thanked the troops, and apparently Neidhart has been given another post (Nijni Novgorod). One newspaper says that M. Witte objected, but he was told that it was too late, the appointment was made. I was hoping that a real victory might be won for the law as against lawlessness of high officials, but my hopes are waning."

=== Aftermath and response ===
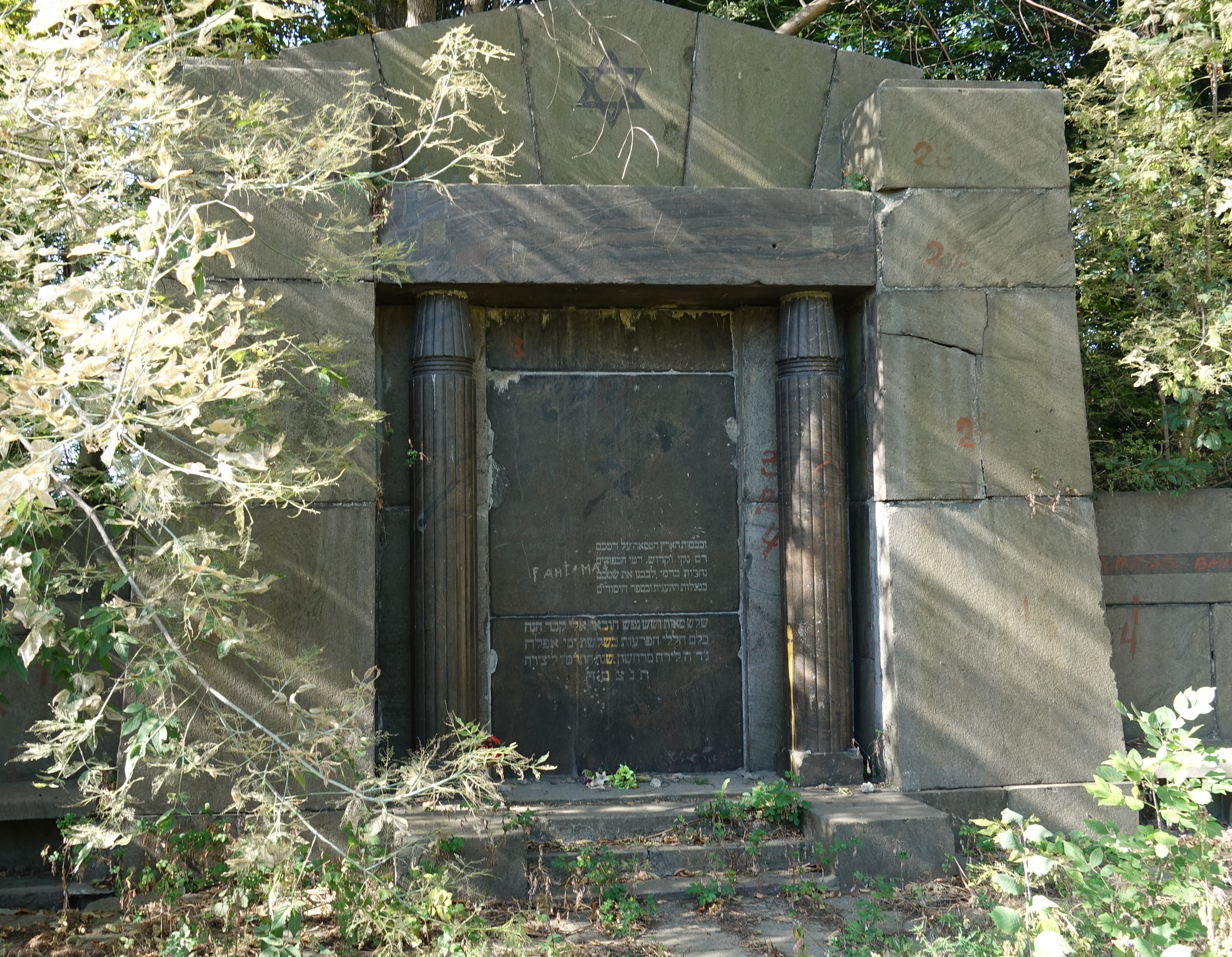
Memorial of victims of the pogrom of 1905. Jewish cemetery in Odessa, Ukraine. Text in Hebrew: "As the impure earth covers your blood, pure and holy blood, blood of atonement. With the blood of our hearts, we will inscribe your names in the Chronicle of Fasting and the Book of Tribulations" [last four lines from a poem by H. N. Bialik called "לקדושים" La-Kedoshim, "To the Holy Ones," or "To the Martyrs," which was written as a graveside poem to victims of violent anti-Jewish riots in Odessa, references the scapegoat of Yom Kippur] "306 souls were brought to this grave. All are victims of the pogroms in the three dark days: 3, 4 and 5 of Marcheshvan 5666 [18-20 October 1905] May their souls be bound in an everlasting bond".

The pogrom caused approximately 3.75 million rubles in property damage, ruined 1,400 businesses, and forced 3,000 families into poverty. The Odessa Jewish Central Committee to Aid the Victims of the Pogroms of 1905 collected 672,833 rubles from Jews in Odessa and abroad to aid those hurt by the pogrom. In total, the committee assisted 2,499 affected families.

Jewish communities in the diaspora, particularly the United States, joined by sympathetic gentiles, responded by raising money for relief funds and by protesting. "People ... have heard with great regret the stories of the sufferings of the Jews in Russia", remarked Secretary of State Frederick T. Frelinghuysen. In 1882 a meeting in New York counted Hamilton Fish, Joseph H. Choate, Edwards Pierrepont, William M. Evarts, as attendees. John W. Foster also sent a letter. In Philadelphia George Sharswood, the governor, spoke at a meeting, and in Congress a joint resolution was passed in support. The pogroms also inspired outrage among philosemitic gentiles in Britain. Between 1880 and 1883 The Times published 13 articles, plus additional notes and reports, protesting the pogroms. Lord Mayor of London John Whittaker Ellis held a meeting at Mansion House, London in 1881 with distinguished MPs and intellectuals in attendance, to protest and to raise funds. He was supported by liberals and conservatives alike such as Matthew Arnold, John Lubbock, James Martineau, Benjamin Jowett, James Bryce, Edward Stanley, and John Hubbard, with Frederic Farrar publishing articles. Joseph Savory, the subsequent lord mayor, in 1890 again held a meeting "to express public opinion upon the renewed persecution to which millions of the Jewish race are subjected in Russia under the yoke of severe and exceptional edicts and disabilities". This meeting was attended by Lord Tennyson, Walter Besant, Thomas Huxley, John Bright, and Lord Curzon. Even in Australia, public meetings in support of the pogroms with fundraising were held in Melbourne, Adelaide, and Sydney, with notable support from George Frederic Verdon and William Bede Dalley.

Charles Stewart Smith, the British Consul, later wrote that such was the prevailing lawlessness that for many months the streets continued to be unsafe. Armed robberies were everyday occurrences. Six months after the pogrom he wrote in a private letter: "Crime continues in odious intensity. The 'Black Crow' robberies have subsided, but bombs are thrown and assassinations occur far too often. A surgeon friend tells me that formerly in the Town hospital they used to receive one or two stabbing cases every week; now there are one or two a day."

The pogrom was one of the events that spurred many Jews to emigrate from Odessa and Ukraine to western Europe and the United States in the following years. Almost 50,000 Jews left Odessa after the 1905 pogroms. Jewish immigration to the US increased by around one quarter the next year. Thousands of Jewish refugees went over the border to Austria-Hungary and Germany, leading to protests targeting Russia, and threats of diplomatic intervention. The value of Russian bonds went down, and Russian lawmakers had to develop new policies to react.

The Mendele Mocher Sforim Museum opened in downtown Odessa in 1927, containing images of the 1871 and 1905 pogroms. During the pre-revolutionary period the tsarist authorities had never allowed a monument to be erected, or pogrom art to be shown, but the Bolsheviks used it as an opportunity to highlight their defeat of the brutal autocracy.

== 1918–1920 ==
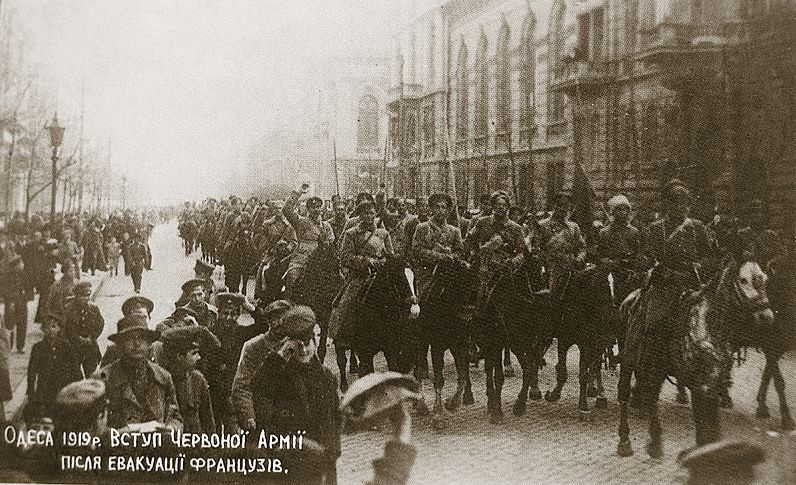
entry of the Red Army into Odessa, 1919

During the aftermath of the Bolshevik revolution and the Russian Civil War, marauding soldiers targeted Jews with uncontrolled violence. The so-called "Red Pogroms" were perpetrated by Red Guards to consolidate Bolshevik power in the spring of 1918 and resisted by Jewish self-defense forces. In 1919 the pogroms were perpetrated by the anti-Bolshevik forces (including the White Army) as well as the Red Army.

A 1919 report indicated that Jewish Odessans joined a Red Army regiment which was 80–85% Jewish, according to the report to protect themselves from pogroms, and that Russians had reportedly refused to join what they pejoratively called a "Yid regiment." The report claimed the members were that of the lumpenproletariat and that the regiment should be transferred away from the front, as it was counterrevolutionary and demoralizing. In some cases the Jewish volunteers sent to the front from Odessa were murdered by their own "comrades" or confronted by antisemitic ordeals and humiliations. The Soviet Head Committee, seeing its authority undermined by the pogrom movement, took measures such as dispersing units "inclined toward pogroms" and creating special Jewish battalions and reorganizations, and reserve units to act on pogroms. In addition to the Jewish volunteer army regiments, Jewish militias including student-run self-defense continued to be active in Odessa.

Connections to the Black Hundreds and antisemitic press continued into the 1920s and 1930s, such as in the Volunteer Army, whose members promoted a Judeo-Bolshevik conspiracy theory. In 1920, Russian colonel Ilya Timofeyevich Struk terrorized and plundered Jews in Odessa, where he claimed, "They close the churches, they tear down our holy icons." The Soviet Cheka was also blamed on Jews which incited violence. One Jewish soldier, Sholem Schwarzbard, survived the 1905 pogrom in nearby Balta and later joined an anarchist regiment in Odessa. After he observed atrocities perpetrated by the White Army in 1919, he joined the "International Brigade" to fight Symon Petliura and ultimately assassinated him. Although he took responsibility, he was acquitted after YIVO director Elias Tcherikower testified on his behalf about the atrocities.

== See also ==
- Pogroms in the Russian Empire
- Kiev pogrom (1881)
- Kishinev pogrom
- Antisemitism in the Russian Empire
- Antisemitism in Russia
- Antisemitism in Ukraine
- History of the Jews in Russia
- History of the Jews in Ukraine
- Racism in Russia
- Racism in the Soviet Union
- Racism in Ukraine
- Relations between Eastern Orthodoxy and Judaism
- 1941 Odessa massacre
- Odessa Museum of the Regional History
