= Types of Zionism =

Different approaches to the subject of creating a Jewish homeland

Zionism is a political ideology advocating for the self-determination of a Jewish national state in their ancestral home. While sharing a core belief in the Jewish people's right to a national home, the Zionist vision covers a range of approaches, including from when the movement was first conceived in the second half of the 19th century.

Zionist beliefs have been categorized into roughly a dozen varieties by academics. The first Zionists were either political or practical Zionists, as typified by Theodor Herzl, considered the father of the Zionist movement. The rise of socialist movements in the first part of the 20th century resulted in the rise of left-wing Labor Zionism. Synthetic and general Zionists combine the ideas of political and practical Zionists. Liberal Zionists emphasize the importance of Liberalism. Revisionist Zionists accept many tenets of Liberal Zionism but have expanded territorial aims—including parts of Jordan. Religious Zionism views Zionism as an integral to Orthodox Judaism. Cultural Zionism emphasizes a secular approach. Revolutionary Zionism emerged from guerrilla warfare against the British (who oversaw Mandatory Palestine), and attracted both left- and right-wing nationalists. Reform Zionism is associated with Reform Judaism.

Other kinds of Zionist thought include Christian Zionism, and even Antisemitic Zionism. Anti-Zionists oppose Zionism altogether. Schools of thought prior to Herzl may be considered Proto-Zionism. Post-Zionism argues that Zionism was successful given the creation of Israel and argues that Israel must build a new civic identity based on multi-ethnic liberal democracy.

== Proto-Zionism ==
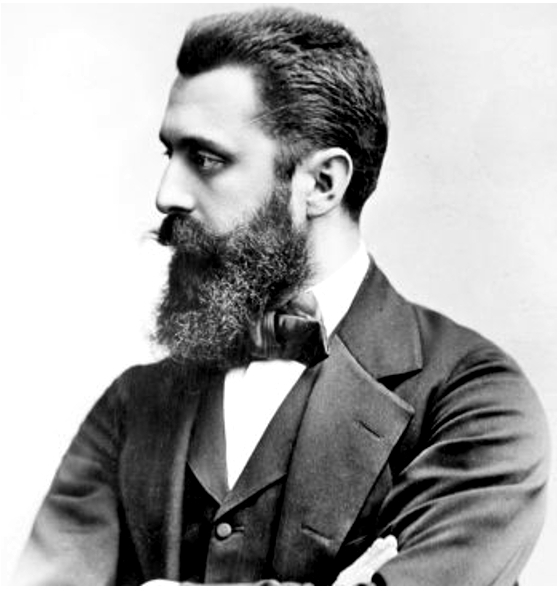
Theodor Herzl is considered the founder of the Zionist movement. In his 1896 book Der Judenstaat, he envisioned the founding of a future independent Jewish state during the 20th century.

The idea of a home for the Jewish people pre-dated Theodor Herzl, and thinkers who espoused such beliefs may be considered proto-Zionists.

== Political Zionism ==
Political Zionism aimed at establishing for the Jewish people a publicly and legally assured home in Palestine through diplomatic negotiation with the established powers that controlled the area. It focused on a Jewish home as a solution to the "Jewish question" and antisemitism in Europe, centred on gaining Jewish sovereignty (probably within the Ottoman or later British or French empire), and was opposed to mass migration until after sovereignty was granted. It initially considered locations other than Palestine (e.g. in Africa) and did not foresee migration by many Western Jews to the new homeland.

Nathan Birnbaum, a Jew from Vienna, was the original father of Political Zionism, yet ever since he defected away from his own movement, Theodor Herzl has become known as the face of modern Zionism. In 1890, Birnbaum coined the term "Zionism" and the phrase "Political Zionism" two years later. Birnbaum published a periodical titled Selbstemanzipation (Self Emancipation) which espoused "the idea of a Jewish renaissance and the resettlement of Palestine." In this idea, Birnbaum was most influenced by Leon Pinsker. Political Zionism was subsequently led by Herzl and Max Nordau. This approach was espoused at the Zionist Organization's First Zionist Congress and dominated the movement during Herzl's life.

== Practical Zionism ==
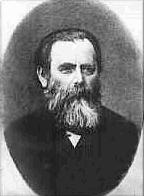
Leon Pinsker espoused Practical Zionism.

Known in Hebrew as Tzionut Ma'asit (Hebrew: ציונות מעשית), Practical Zionism was led by Moshe Leib Lilienblum and Leon Pinsker and molded by the Lovers of Zion organization. This approach believed that firstly there was a need in practical terms to implement Aliyah, Jewish immigration to Palestine as the Holy Land, and settlement of the land as soon as possible, even if a charter was not obtained.

The Tzabarim had no patience with all this ideological nonsense. Even the word "Zionism" became a synonym for nonsense – "don't talk Zionism!" (Note: Hebrew: אל תדבר ציונות!) meant "stop uttering highfaluting phrases".

— Uri Avnery, born in 1923, describing the politics of activists in pre-Holocaust Palestine.

It became dominant after Herzl's death, and differed from Political Zionism in not seeing Zionism as justified primarily by the Jewish Question but rather as an end in itself; it "aspired to the establishment of an elite utopian community in Palestine". It also differed from Political Zionism in "distrust[ing] grand political actions" and preferring "an evolutionary incremental process toward the establishment of the national home".

== Labor Zionism ==
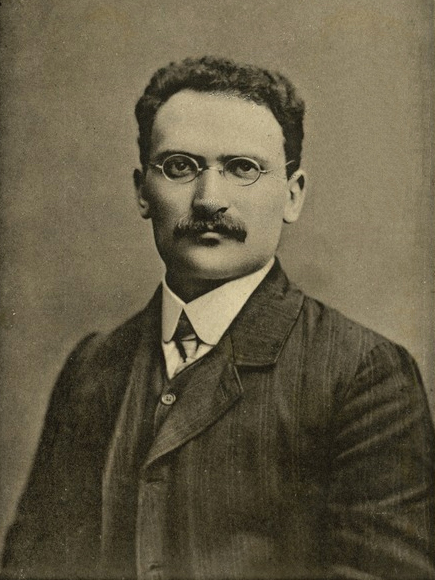
Dov Ber Borochov, one of the leaders of Labor Zionism

Led by socialists Nachman Syrkin, Haim Arlosoroff, and Berl Katznelson and Marxist Ber Borochov, Labor or socialist Zionists desired to establish an agricultural society not on the basis of a bourgeois capitalist society, but rather on the basis of equality. Labor or Socialist Zionism was a form of Zionism that also espoused socialist or social democratic politics.

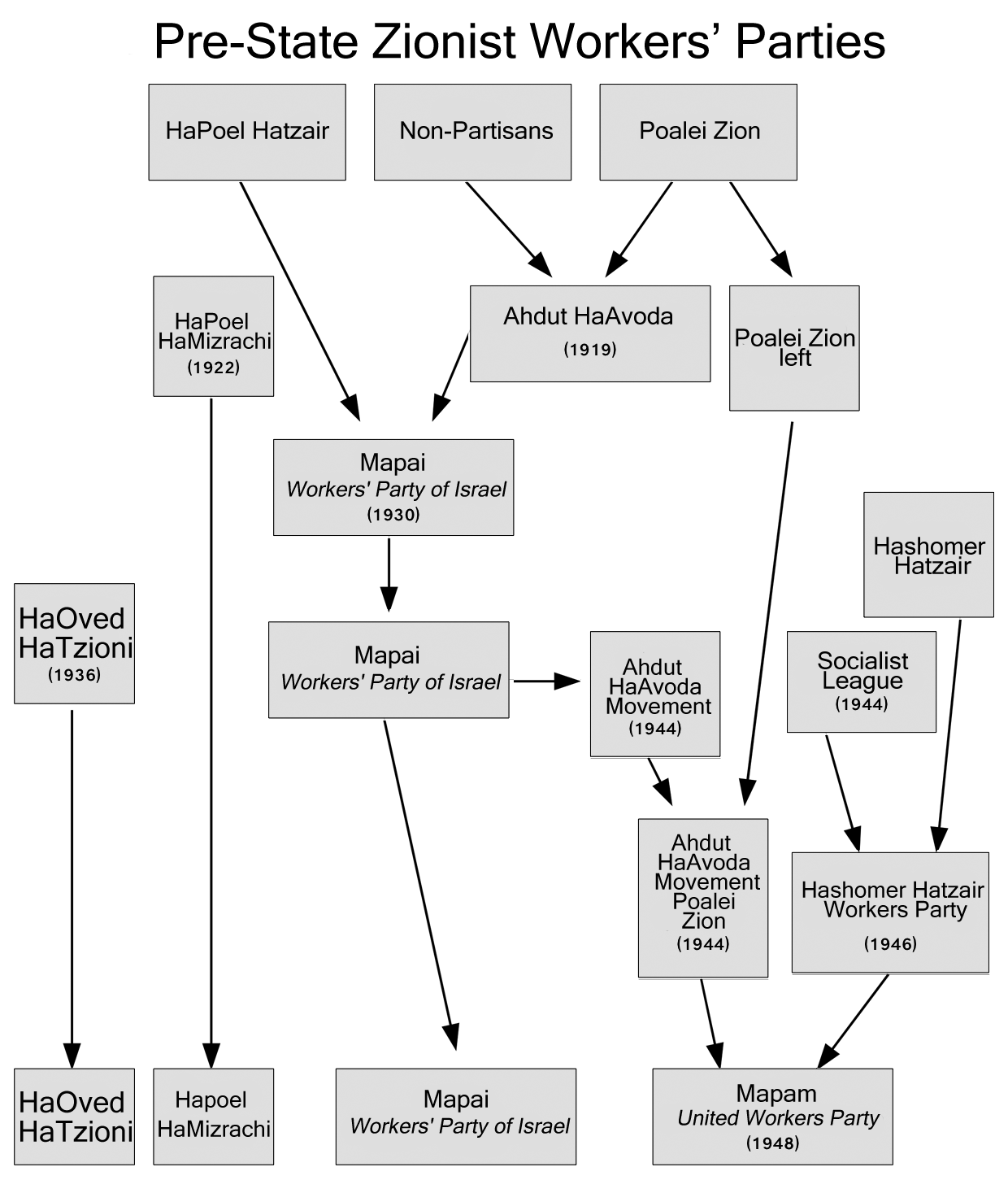
chart of Zionist workers parties

Although there were socialist Zionists in the nineteenth century (such as Moses Hess), labor Zionism became a mass movement with the founding of Poale Zion ("Workers of Zion") groups in Eastern and Western Europe and North America in the 1900s. Other early socialist Zionist groups were the youth movement Hapoel Hatzair founded by A. D. Gordon and Syrkin's Zionist Socialist Workers Party.

Socialist Zionism had a Marxist current, led by Borochov. After 1917 (the year of Borochov's death as well as the Russian Revolution and the Balfour Declaration), Poale Zion split between a Left (that supported Bolshevism and then the Soviet Union) and a social democratic Right (that became dominant in Palestine).

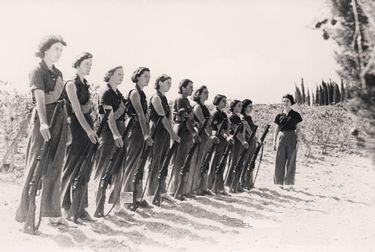
Kibbutznikiyot (female Kibbutz members) in Mishmar HaEmek, during the 1948 Arab–Israeli War. The Kibbutz is the historical heartland of Labor Zionism.

In Ottoman Palestine, Poale Zion founded the Hashomer guard organization that guarded settlements of the Yishuv, and took up the ideology of "conquest of labor" (Kibbush Ha'avoda) and "Hebrew labor" (Avoda Ivrit). It also gave birth to the youth movements Hashomer Hatzair and Habonim Dror. According to Ze'ev Sternhell, both Poalei Zion and Hapoel Hatzair believed that Zionism could only succeed as a result of constantly and rapidly expanding capitalist growth. Poale Zion "saw capitalism as the cause of Jewish poverty and misery in Europe. For Poale Zion, Jews could only escape this cycle by creating a nation-state like others." However, according to Sternhell, Labor Zionism ultimately did not promise to free workers from the inherent dependencies of the capitalist system. In Labor Zionist thought, a revolution of the Jewish soul and society was necessary and achievable in part by Jews moving to Israel and becoming farmers, workers, and soldiers in a country of their own. Labor Zionists established rural communes in Israel called "kibbutzim" which began as a variation on a "national farm" scheme, a form of cooperative agriculture where the Jewish National Fund hired Jewish workers under trained supervision. The kibbutzim were a symbol of the Second Aliyah in that they put great emphasis on communalism and egalitarianism, representing Utopian socialism to a certain extent. Furthermore, they stressed self-sufficiency, which became an essential aspect of Labor Zionism.

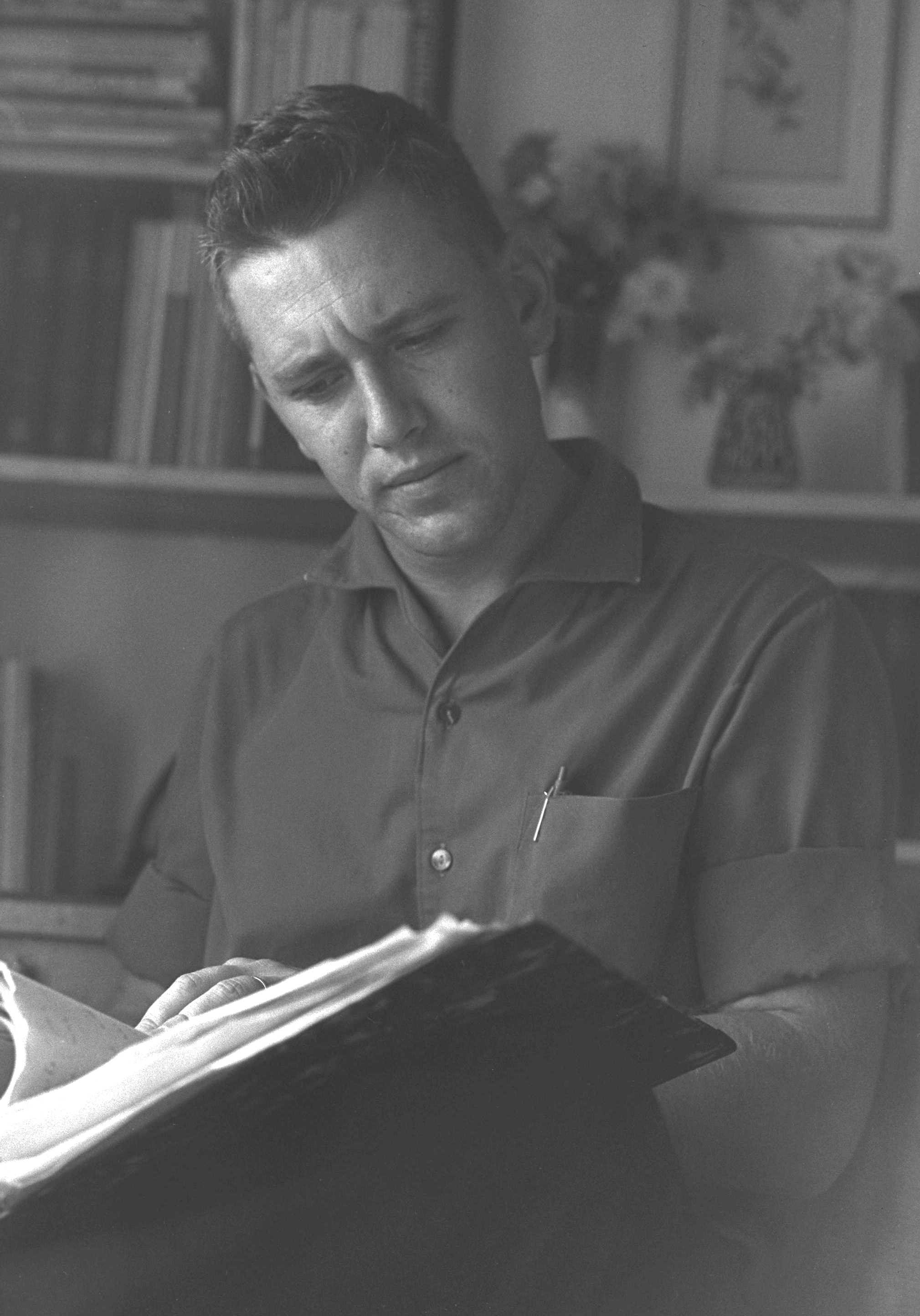
Israeli author Amos Oz, who today is described as the 'aristocrat' of Labor Zionism

In the 1920s, Labor Zionists in Palestine also created a trade union movement, the Histadrut, and political party, Mapai. In Palestine, PZ disbanded to make way for the formation of the nationalist socialist Ahdut HaAvoda, led by David Ben Gurion, in 1919. Hapoel Hatzair merge with Ahdut Ha'avoda in 1930 to form Mapai, at which point, according to Yosef Gorny, Poale Zion became of marginal political importance in Palestine.

Labor Zionism, represented by Mapai, became the dominant force in the political and economic life of the Yishuv during the British Mandate of Palestine. Poale Zion's successor parties, Mapam, Mapai and the Israeli Labor Party (which were led by figures such as David Ben Gurion and Golda Meir, dominated Israeli politics until the 1977 election when the Israeli Labor Party was defeated. Until the 1970s, the Histadrut was the largest employer in Israel after the Israeli government.

Sternhell and Benny Morris both argue that Labor Zionism developed as a nationalist socialist movement in which the nationalist tendencies would overpower and drive out the socialist ones. Traditionalist Israeli historian Anita Shapira describes labor Zionism's use of violence against Palestinians for political means as essentially the same as that of radical conservative Zionist groups. For example, Shapira notes that during the 1936 Palestine revolt, the Irgun Zvai Leumi engaged in the "uninhibited use of terror", "mass indiscriminate killings of the aged, women and children", "attacks against British without any consideration of possible injuries to innocent bystanders, and the murder of British in cold blood". Shapira argues that there were only marginal differences in military behavior between the Irgun and the labor Zionist Palmah. In following with policies laid out by Ben-Gurion, the prevalent method among field squads was that if an Arab gang had used a village as a hideout, it was considered acceptable to hold the entire village collectively responsible. The lines delineating what was acceptable and unacceptable while dealing with these villagers were "vague and intentionally blurred". As Shapira suggests, these ambiguous limits practically did not differ from those of the openly terrorist group, Irgun.

== General and Liberal Zionism ==
Synthetic Zionism, led by Chaim Weizmann, Leo Motzkin and Nahum Sokolow, was an approach that advocated a combination of Political and Practical Zionism. It was the ideology of General Zionism, the centrist current between Labor Zionism and religious Zionism, that was initially the dominant trend within the Zionist movement from the First Zionist Congress in 1897 until after the First World War. General Zionists identified with the liberal European middle class to which many Zionist leaders such as Herzl and Chaim Weizmann aspired. As head of the World Zionist Organization, Weizmann's policies had a sustained impact on the Zionist movement, with Abba Eban describing him as a dominant figure in Jewish life during the interwar period. The current had a left wing ("General Zionists A"), who supported a mixed economy and good relations with Britain, and a right wing ("General Zionists B"), who were anti-socialist and anti-British. After independence, neither arm played a significant role in Israeli politics, the "A" group allying with Mapai and the "B" group forming a dwindling right-wing opposition party.

According to Zionist Israeli historian Simha Flapan, writing in the 1970s, the essential assumptions of Weizmann's strategy were later adopted by Ben-Gurion and subsequent Zionist (and Israeli) leaders. According to Flapan, by replacing "Great Britain" with "United States" and "Arab National Movement" with "Hashemite Kingdom of Jordan", Weizmann's strategic concepts can be seen as reflective of Israel's current foreign policy.

Weizmann's ultimate goal was the establishment of a Jewish state, even beyond the borders of "Greater Israel." For Weizmann, Palestine was a Jewish and not an Arab country. The state he sought would contain the east bank of the Jordan River and extend from the Litani River (in present-day Lebanon). Weizmann's strategy involved incrementally approaching this goal over a long period, in the form of settlement and land acquisition. Weizmann was open to the idea of Arabs and Jews jointly running Palestine through an elected council with equal representation, but he did not view the Arabs as equal partners in negotiations about the country's future. In particular, he was steadfast in his view of the "moral superiority" of the Jewish claim to Palestine over the Arab claim and believed these negotiations should be conducted solely between Britain and the Jews.

Liberal Zionism, although not associated with any single party in modern Israel, remains a strong trend in Israeli politics advocating free market principles, democracy and adherence to human rights. Their political arm was one of the ancestors of the modern-day Likud; however, Kadima, the main centrist party during the 2000s that split from Likud and was de facto defunct by 2015, identified with many of the fundamental policies of Liberal Zionist ideology, advocating among other things the need for Palestinian statehood in order to form a more democratic society in Israel, affirming the free market, and calling for equal rights for Arab citizens of Israel.

== Revisionist Zionism ==
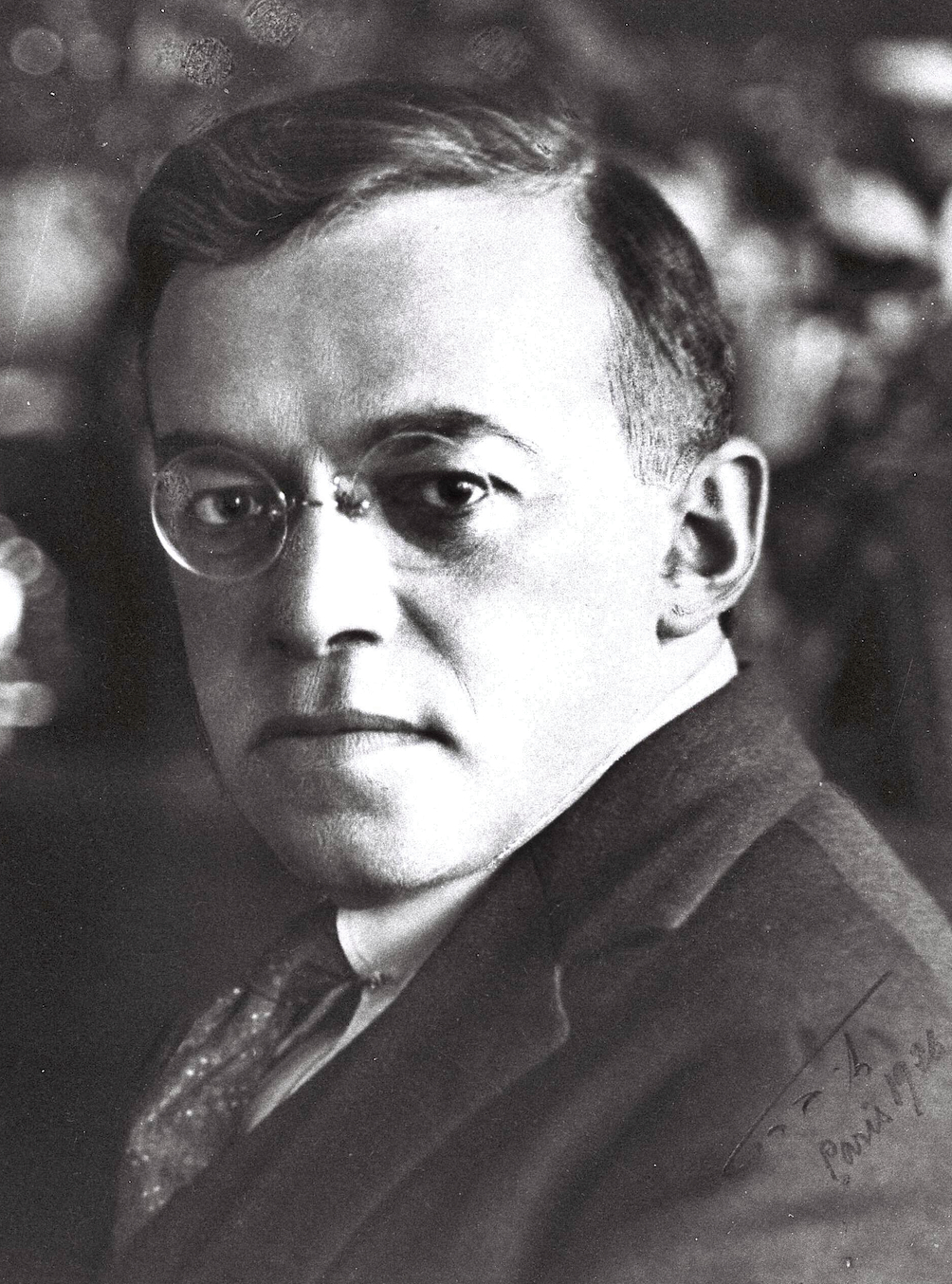
Ze'ev Jabotinsky, founder of Revisionist Zionism

Revisionist Zionism was initially led by Ze'ev Jabotinsky and later by his successor Menachem Begin (later Prime Minister of Israel), and emphasized the romantic elements of Jewish nationality, and the historical heritage of the Jewish people in the Land of Israel as the constituent basis for the Zionist national idea and the establishment of the Jewish State. They supported liberalism, particularly economic liberalism, and opposed Labor Zionism and the establishing of a communist society in the Land of Israel.

Jabotinsky founded the Revisionist Party in 1925. Jabotinsky rejected Weizmann's strategy of incremental state building, instead preferring to immediately declare sovereignty over the entire region, which extended to both the East and West bank of the Jordan river. Like Weizmann and Herzl, Jabotinsky also believed that the support of a great power was essential to the success of Zionism. From early on, Jabotinksy openly rejected the possibility of a "voluntary agreement" with the Arabs of Palestine. He instead believed in building an "iron wall" of Jewish military force to break Arab resistance to Zionism, at which point an agreement could be established.

Revisionist Zionists believed that a Jewish state must expand to both sides of the Jordan River, i.e. taking Transjordan in addition to all of Palestine. The movement developed what became known as Nationalist Zionism, whose guiding principles were outlined in the 1923 essay Iron Wall, a term denoting the force needed to prevent Palestinian resistance against colonization. Jabotinsky wrote, "Zionism is a colonising adventure and it therefore stands or falls by the question of armed force. It is important to build, it is important to speak Hebrew, but, unfortunately, it is even more important to be able to shoot—or else I am through with playing at colonization."

Historian Avi Shlaim characterizes Jabotinsky's view of Zionism "not as the return of the Jews to their spiritual homeland but as an offshoot or implant of Western civilization in the East." As a result, "Zionism was to be permanently allied with European colonialism against all the Arabs in the eastern Mediterranean."

In 1935 the Revisionists left the WZO because it refused to state that the creation of a Jewish state was an objective of Zionism. According to Israeli historian Yosef Gorny, the Revisionists remained within the ideological mainstream of the Zionist movement even after this split. The Revisionists advocated the formation of a Jewish Army in Palestine to force the Arab population to accept mass Jewish migration. Revisionist Zionism opposed any restraint in relation to Arab violence and supported firm military action against the Arabs that had attacked the Jewish Community in Mandatory Palestine. Due to that position, a faction of the Revisionist leadership split from that movement in order to establish the underground Irgun. This stream is also categorized as supporters of Greater Israel.

Supporters of Revisionist Zionism developed the Likud Party in Israel, which has dominated most governments since 1977. It advocates Israel's maintaining control of the West Bank, including East Jerusalem, and takes a hard-line approach in the Arab–Israeli conflict. In 2005, Likud split over the issue of creation of a Palestinian state in the occupied territories. Party members advocating peace talks helped form the Kadima Party.

== Religious Zionism ==
Initially led by Yitzchak Yaacov Reines, founder of the Mizrachi movement, and by Abraham Isaac Kook, Religious Zionism is a variant of Zionist ideology that combines religious conservatism and secular nationalism into a theology with patriotism as its basis. Before the establishment of the state of Israel, Religious Zionists were mainly observant Jews who supported Zionist efforts to build a Jewish state in the Land of Israel. Religious Zionism maintained that Jewish nationality and the establishment of the State of Israel is a religious duty derived from the Torah. As opposed to some parts of the Jewish non-secular community that claimed that the redemption of the Land of Israel will occur only after the coming of the messiah, who will fulfill this aspiration, they maintained that human acts of redeeming the Land will bring about the messiah, as their slogan states: "The land of Israel for the people of Israel according to the Torah of Israel" (Hebrew: ארץ ישראל לעם ישראל לפי תורת ישראל). One of the core ideas in Religious Zionism is the belief that the ingathering of exiles in the Land of Israel and the establishment of Israel is Atchalta De'Geulah ("the beginning of the redemption"), the initial stage of the geula. Their ideology revolves around three pillars: the Land of Israel, the People of Israel and the Torah of Israel.

The Labor Movement wing of Religious Zionism, founded in 1921 under the Zionist slogan "Torah va'Avodah" (Torah and Labor), was called HaPoel HaMizrachi. It represented religiously traditional Labour Zionists, both in Europe and in the Land of Israel, where it represented religious Jews in the Histadrut. In 1956, Mizrachi, HaPoel HaMizrachi, and other religious Zionists formed the National Religious Party (NRP), which operated as an independent political party until the 2003 elections.

After the Six-Day War and the capture of the West Bank, a territory referred to by the movement as Judea and Samaria, the movement turned right as it integrated revanchist and irredentist forms of nationalism and evolved into what is sometimes known as Neo-Zionism. In the current period, this right-wing form of religious Zionism, powerful within the settlement movement, is represented by Gush Emunim (founded by students of Abraham Kook's son Zvi Yehuda Kook in 1974), Jewish Home (HaBayit HaYehudi, formed in 2009), Tkuma, and Meimad. Today they are commonly referred as the "Religious Nationalists" or the "settlers", and are also categorized as supporters of Greater Israel.

Kahanism, a radical branch of religious Zionism, was founded by Rabbi Meir Kahane, whose party, Kach, was eventually banned from the Knesset, but has been increasingly influential on Israeli politics. The Otzma Yehudit (Jewish Power) party, which espouses Kahanism, won six seats in the 2022 Israeli legislative election, forming what has been called the most right-wing government in Israeli history.

== Cultural Zionism ==
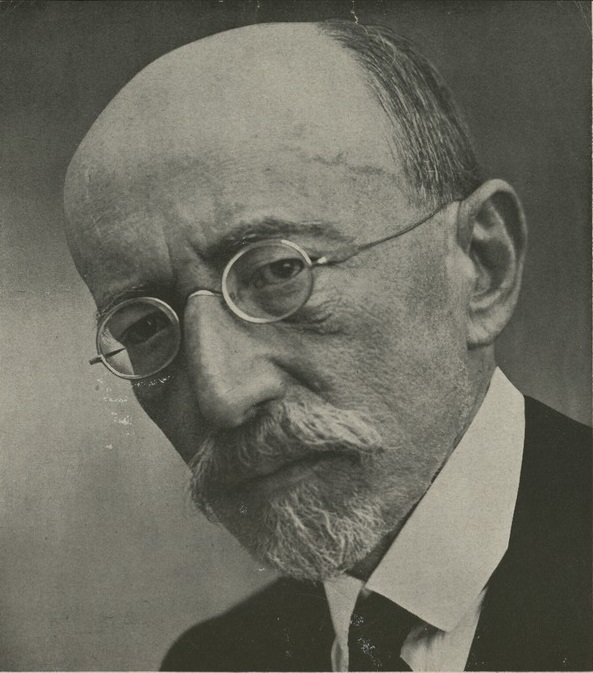
Ahad Ha'am (Asher Ginsberg)

Cultural Zionism or Spiritual Zionism is a strain of Zionism that focused on creating a center in historic Palestine with its own secular Jewish culture and national history, including language and historical roots, rather than on mass migration or state-building. The founder of Cultural Zionism was Asher Ginsberg, better known as Ahad Ha'am. Like Hibbat Zion and unlike Herzl, Ha'am saw Palestine as the spiritual centre of Jewish life. Ha'am inaugurated the movement in his 1880 essay "This is not the way", which called for the cultivation of a qualitative Jewish presence in the land over [the] quantitative one" pursued by Hibbat Zion. Ha'am was also a sharp critic of Herzl; spiritual Zionism believed that the realpolitik engaged in by Political Zionism corrupted Jewry, and opposed any political solutions that victimised non-Jewish people in the land.

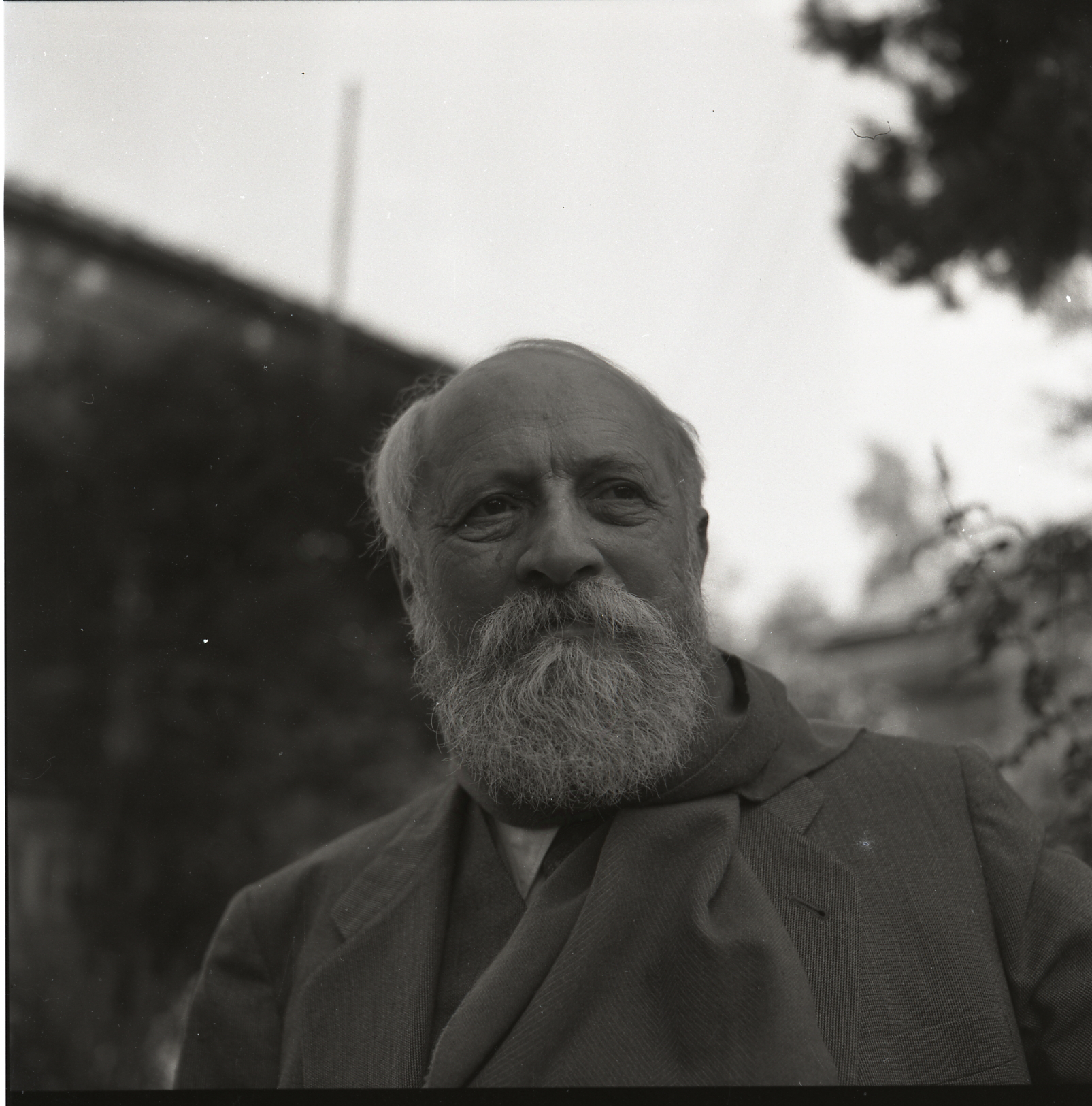
Martin Buber in Israel (1962)

Brit Shalom, which promoted Arab-Jewish cooperation, was established in 1925 by supporters of Ahad Ha'am's Spiritual Zionism, including Martin Buber, Gershom Scholem, Hans Kohn, "and other important figures of the intellectual elite of the pre-independence yishuv, Gorny describes it as an ultimately marginal group.

== Revolutionary Zionism ==
Led by Avraham Stern, Israel Eldad and Uri Zvi Greenberg, Revolutionary Zionism viewed Zionism as a revolutionary struggle to ingather the Jewish exiles from the Diaspora, revive the Hebrew language as a spoken vernacular and reestablish a Jewish kingdom in the Land of Israel. As members of Lehi during the 1940s, many adherents of Revolutionary Zionism engaged in guerilla warfare against the British administration in an effort to end the British Mandate of Palestine and pave the way for Jewish political independence. Following the State of Israel's establishment leading figures of this stream argued that the creation of the state of Israel was never the goal of Zionism but rather a tool to be used in realizing the goal of Zionism, which they called Malkhut Yisrael (the Kingdom of Israel). Revolutionary Zionists are often mistakenly included among Revisionist Zionists but differ ideologically in several areas. While Revisionists were for the most part secular nationalists who hoped to achieve a Jewish state that would exist as a commonwealth within the British Empire, Revolutionary Zionists advocated a form of national-messianism that aspired towards a vast Jewish kingdom with a rebuilt Temple in Jerusalem. Revolutionary Zionism generally espoused anti-imperialist political views and included both Right-wing and Left-wing nationalists among its adherents. This stream is also categorized as supporters of Greater Israel.

== Reform Zionism ==
Reform Zionism, also known as Progressive Zionism, is the ideology of the Zionist arm of the Reform or Progressive branch of Judaism. The Association of Reform Zionists of America is the American Reform movement's Zionist organization. Their mission "endeavors to make Israel fundamental to the sacred lives and Jewish identity of Reform Jews. As a Zionist organization, the association champions activities that further enhance Israel as a pluralistic, just and democratic Jewish state." In Israel, Reform Zionism is associated with the Israel Movement for Progressive Judaism.

== Secular Zionism ==
Secular Zionism is a variant of Zionism that advocates for the establishment and development of a Jewish homeland—primarily in Land of Israel—on the basis of Jewish national identity, culture, and history, rather than religious belief or theological justification. Early Zionism developed into several major streams, commonly identified as religious, political, cultural, and labor-socialist, with the latter three generally regarded as forms of secular Zionism.

== Christian Zionism ==
Certain groups of Christians support Zionism. The reasons for doing so vary, but may include the desire to convert Jews to beliefs such as Messianic Judaism, or because they believe that returning the Holy Land to the Jewish people fulfills a biblical prophecy that is necessary to bring about the apocalypse.

== Post-Zionism ==
Post-Zionists argue that Zionism was successful given the creation of Israel and argues that modern Israel now faces a challenge between whether it should be a Jewish state or a democratic state. Post-Zionists argue that Israel should build a civic identity based on a multi-ethnic liberal democracy that does not privilege any people above others.

== Neo-Zionism ==
Neo-Zionism is a right-wing to far-right, ultranationalist, and religious ideology that appeared in Israel following the Six-Day War in 1967 and the capture of the West Bank and Gaza Strip. Neo-Zionists consider these lands part of Israel and advocate their settlement by Israeli Jews. Some advocate the transfer of Arabs not only from these areas but also from within the Green Line.

== Other types ==
- Federal Zionism
- Green Zionism

== See also ==
- Anti-Zionism
- Autonomism
- Bundism
- Canaanism
- Diaspora nationalism
- Folkism
- Neo-Zionism
- Non-Zionism
- Territorialism
- Yiddishism
