= First Aliyah =

Jewish immigration to Palestine (1881–1903)

The First Aliyah (Hebrew: העלייה הראשונה, romanized: HaAliyah HaRishona), also known as the agriculture Aliyah, was a major wave of Jewish immigration (aliyah) to Ottoman Palestine between 1881 and 1903. Jews who migrated in this wave came mostly from Eastern Europe, stimulated by pogroms and violence against the Jewish communities there. A smaller number came from other areas such as Yemen, and were primarily motivated by religious purposes. Estimates of the numbers of Jews who immigrated range from 25,000 to a total 60,000, with between 50-70% who later immigrated elsewhere. Many of the European Jewish immigrants during the late 19th-early 20th century period gave up after a few months and went back to their country of origin, often suffering from hunger and disease.

During the first Aliyah, agricultural settlements called Moshava were established. The immigrants engaged almost exclusively in agriculture.

At the beginning of the period, the Jewish population in Ottoman Palestine was around 26,000. Over the course of the First Aliyah, many immigrants arrived from different countries in Europe, Africa, and Asia. By the end of this period, the Jewish population in Ottoman Palestine had grown to approximately 55,000.

The use of the term "First Aliyah" is controversial because there had been a previous wave of immigration to Ottoman Syria starting in the mid-19th century (between 1840 and 1880, the Jewish population in Ottoman Syria rose from 9,000 to 23,000). However, nearly all of the Jews from Eastern Europe before the First Aliyah came from traditional Jewish families who were inspired by traditional ideas of the holiness of the land combined with practical/economic considerations, rather than by modern Zionist ideology. Thus the First Aliyah represents the beginning of organized Zionism in the Land of Israel, differentiating it from earlier immigration.

== Background ==
The migration to Ottoman Palestine at the end of the 19th century and the beginning of the 20th century took place during a period of mass global emigration from Eastern Europe to the Western World. From the early 19th century until World War II, approximately 65 million people, including around 4.5 million Jews, migrated to countries in Central and Western Europe and the Americas, including North and South America, Australia, and South Africa. The majority of Jewish emigrants went from Eastern Europe to the United States, with additional destinations in North and South America, Western Europe, Australia, and South Africa. A small minority of the Jewish emigrants moved to Palestine during the early waves of migration, and some of them settled there.

Among the reasons for the mass migration from Eastern Europe were economic hardships resulting from rapid population growth. The Jewish community from the Pale of Settlement in western Russia, Galicia, and Romania, in particular, suffered from economic difficulties. Most of the Jewish emigrants (who mainly migrated to America) were families seeking to escape persecution and aiming to improve their personal and economic security. Antisemitic persecution both by authorities and by the local population in Eastern Europe, primarily in the Russian Empire, intensified the Jewish migration. Prominent antisemitic incidents in this context included the "Kiev pogrom" in 1881, the "May Laws" in 1882, and the expulsion of Moscow's Jews in 1890.

== Reasoning and motives ==
This migration to Ottoman Palestine was influenced by extensive Zionist activity in Eastern Europe, which inspired a sense of historical and religious connection between the Jewish people and the ancient land, despite its difficult political and economic environment compared to other migration destinations.

After widespread pogroms in the Russian Empire, known as the "Kiev Pogrom" (1881), the pamphlet "Auto-Emancipation!" by Leon Pinsker was published and the organization "Hibbat Zion" (Lovers of Zion) was established. Its members opened branches in many cities and towns, leading to a national awakening among part of the Jewish population in the Pale of Settlement areas, extending beyond the borders of the Russian Empire. The rise in antisemitism made the Zionist movement popular, replacing the attitude of integration into European societies. On January 11, 1882, the first Lovers of Zion congress, the Focșani Zionist Congress, was held. Its participants represented around 70,000 activists, which accounted for one third of Romanian Jews at the time. Mosheh Halevy Goldring, a leader and visionary, called the convention 'the Union for the Agricultural Settlement' and presented a bold plan to organize group emigration to Palestine and Syria and establish farming communities there.

There, the Central Committee for Settling the Land of Israel and Syria was established. It was the first organization dealing with organized immigrant groups to the Land of Israel. The committee organized expeditions from Galați on the Danube to the Land of Israel, bringing emigrants from Jewish communities in Romania. Through the committee's activities, about 600 people, out of approximately 1,000 early immigrants, settled in nine Moshava, including Rosh Pina and Zichron Yaakov. In 1883, the committee ran into financial difficulties and transferred the assets of Zichron Yaakov to Baron Rothschild.

Many of the immigrants were simply seeking what any other immigrants were seaking: a better life away from pogroms.

== History ==
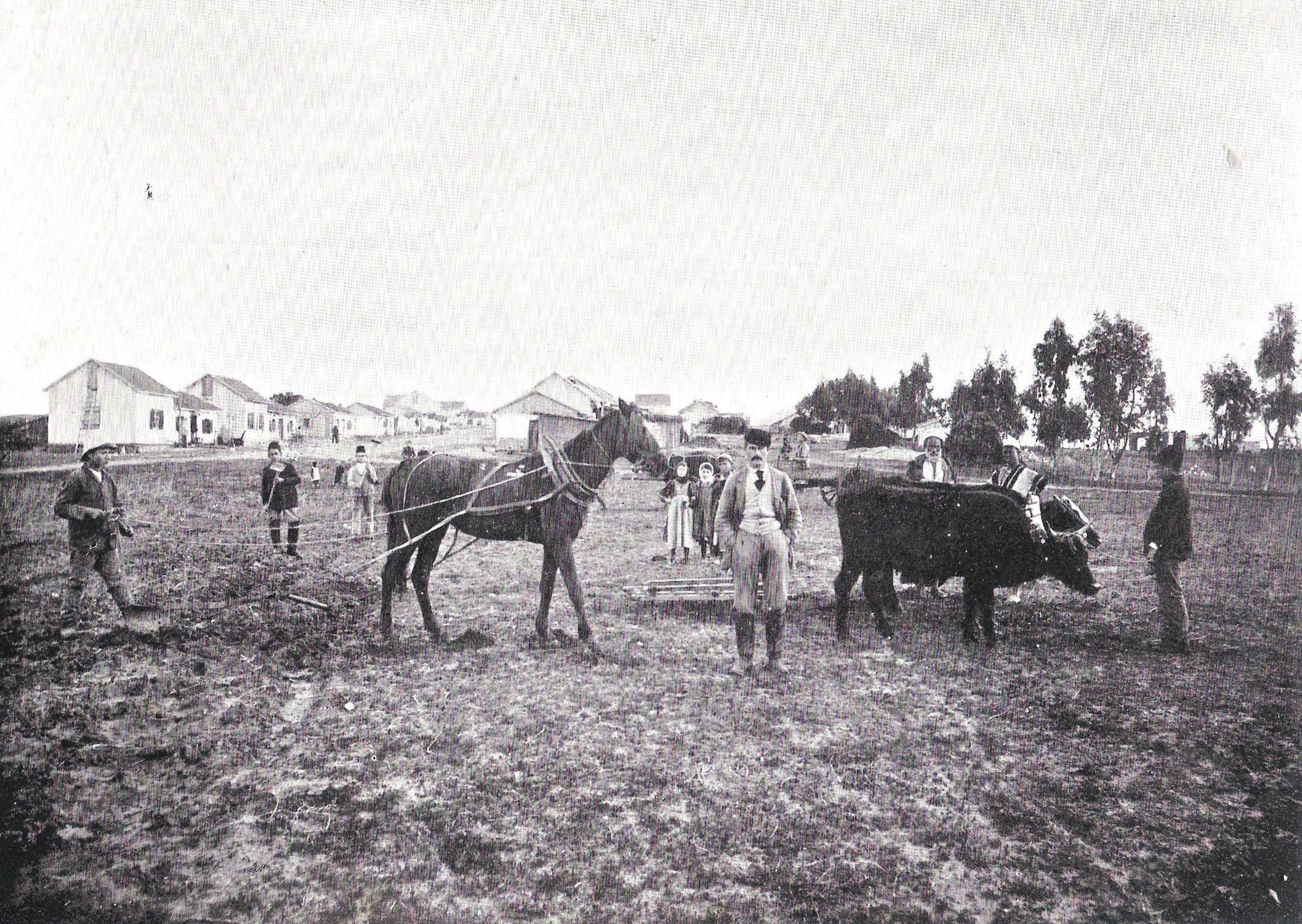
Settlers from Bessarabia c. 1888 in the colony of Castina, near the Palestinian village of Qastina. The colony was later re-established as Be'er Tuvia in 1896.

The First Aliyah occurred from 1881 to 1903 and did not go as planned as Zionists ran out of funds. Wealthy banker Edmond de Rothschild helped the Zionist movement by funding Zionists and by purchasing large settlements and by creating new settlements.

After the first wave in the early 1880s, there was another spike in 1890. The Russian Empire officially approved the activity of Hovevei Zion in 1890. The same year, the "Odessa Committee" began its operation in Jaffa. The purpose of this organization was to absorb immigrants to Ottoman Syria who came as a result of the activities of Hovevei Zion in Russia. Also Russian Jewry's situation deteriorated as the authorities continued to push Jews out of business and trade and Moscow was almost entirely cleansed of Jews.

The Ottoman authorities recognized the Jewish immigration wave to the land as early as November 1882. They understood from the beginning of the 1880s that it was part of a larger Jewish national plan. Consequently, they took steps to limit the entry options for Jews into the country. Restrictions were imposed, despite the Sultan's permit for Jewish settlement given during a meeting with two Jewish representatives from Romania in May 1882. The scope of the immigration diminished due to these restrictions and the difficulties faced by the immigrants.

=== From Eastern Europe ===
Jewish immigration to Ottoman Palestine from Eastern Europe occurred as part of mass emigrations of approximately 2.5 million people that took place towards the end of the 19th and beginning of the 20th century. A rapid increase in population had created economic problems that affected Jewish societies in the Pale of Settlement in Russia, Galicia, and Romania.

Persecution of Jews in Russia was also a factor. In 1881, Tsar Alexander II of Russia was assassinated, and the authorities blamed the Jews for the assassination. Consequently, in addition to the May Laws, major anti-Jewish pogroms swept the Pale of Settlement. A movement called Hibbat Zion (lovers of Zion) spread across the Pale (helped by Leon Pinsker's pamphlet Auto-Emancipation), as did the similar Bilu movement. Both movements encouraged Jews to emigrate to Ottoman Palestine.

In 1882, many Jews who were preparing to immigrate, and several organizations that were on the verge of finalizing land purchases for establishing settlements were thrown into disarray and decided not to immigrant because of the Ottoman's restriction.

The immigration renewed in 1890 for several reasons, the prominent among them were:

1. The Russian government granted official approval for the activities of the "Hibbat Zion" movement in 1890. Starting from this year, the "Odessa Committee" began operating in the Land, aiming to give home to immigrants who arrived in the country legally due to the Zionist activity in Russia. The Jews arrived to the land as Russian citizens.
2. The economic situation of Russian Jews worsened, as the authorities continued to push Jews out of trade and industry. In 1891, Jews were expelled from Moscow. This difficult situation increased immigration from Russia.
3. The economic condition of the settlements from the first wave of immigration improved during the period of the first Aliyah, thanks to the assistance of Baron Rothschild (through planting orchards, establishing vineyards, etc.). This phenomenon attracted the second wave of the first Aliyah to the Land of Israel.

=== From Yemen ===
The first group of immigrants from Yemen came approximately seven months before most of the Eastern European Jews arrived in Palestine.

Due to the changes in the Ottoman Empire, citizens could move more freely, and in 1869, travel was improved with the opening of the Suez Canal, which reduced the travel time from Yemen to Ottoman Syria. Certain Yemenite Jews interpreted these changes and the new developments in the "Holy Land" as heavenly signs that the time of redemption was near. By settling in Ottoman Syria, they would play a part in what they believed could precipitate the anticipated messianic era. Emigration from Yemen to the Mutasarrifate of Jerusalem (Ottoman Syria) began in early 1881 and continued almost without interruption until 1914. It was during this time that about 10% of the Yemenite Jews left. From 1881 to 1882, a few hundred Jews left Sanaa and several nearby settlements. This wave was followed by other Jews from central Yemen who continued to move into Ottoman Syrian provinces until 1914. The majority of these groups moved into Jerusalem and Jaffa. In 1884, some families settled into a new-built neighborhood called Yemenite Village Kfar Hashiloach (Hebrew: כפר השילוח) in the Jerusalem district of Silwan, and built the Old Yemenite Synagogue.

Before World War I, there was another wave that began in 1906 and continued until 1914. Hundreds of Yemenite Jews made their way to Ottoman Syria and chose to settle in the agricultural settlements. It was after these movements that the World Zionist Organization sent Shmuel Yavne'eli to Yemen to encourage Jews to emigrate to the Land of Israel. Yavne'eli reached Yemen at the beginning of 1911 and returned to Ottoman Syria in April 1912. Due to Yavne'eli's efforts, about 1,000 Jews left central and southern Yemen, with several hundred more arriving before 1914.

== Settlement ==
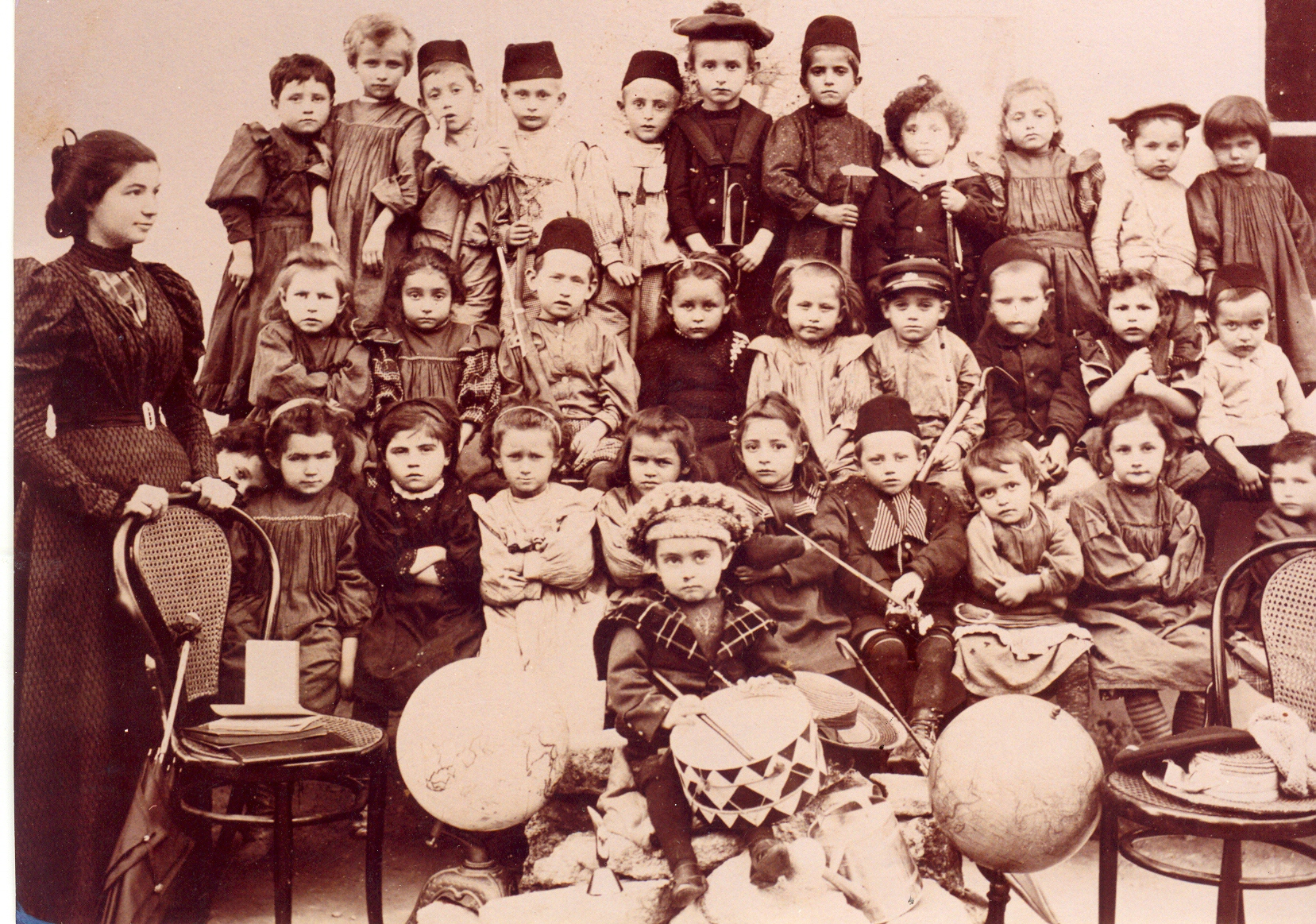
Kindergarten in Rishon Lezion, c. 1898

The First Aliyah laid the cornerstone for Jewish settlement in Israel and created several settlements – Rishon LeZion, Rosh Pinna, Zikhron Ya'akov, Gedera, among others. Immigrants of the First Aliyah also contributed to existing Jewish towns and settlements, notably Petah Tikva. The first neighbourhoods of Tel Aviv (Neve Tzedek, 1887; and Neve Shalom, 1890) were also built by members of the aliyah, although it was not until the Second Aliyah that Tel Aviv was officially founded.

The settlements established by the First Aliyah, known in Hebrew as moshavot are:

- Rishon LeZion (1882)
- Rosh Pinna (1882, taking over and renaming the colony of Gei Oni established in 1878 and down to three families by 1882)
- Zikhron Ya'akov (1882)
- Petah Tikva (1882; reestablished after first attempt in 1878)
- Mazkeret Batya (1883 established as "Ekron")
- Ness Ziona (1883; began as "Nahalat Reuven")
- Yesud HaMa'ala (1883)
- Gedera (1884)
- Bat Shlomo (1889)
- Meir Shfeya (1889)
- Rehovot (1890)
- Mishmar HaYarden (1890)
- Hadera (1891)
- Ein Zeitim (1892)
- Motza (1894)
- Hartuv (1895)
- Metula (1896)
- Be'er Tuvia (1896 reestablished and renamed by Hovevei Zion; first settled in 1887 under the name Castina)
- Bnei Yehuda (1898; not identical with the new Bnei Yehuda, Golan Heights
- Mahanayim (1898–1912)
- Sejera (1899)
- Mas'ha (1901), renamed Kfar Tavor in 1903
- Yavne'el (1901)
- Menahemia (1901)
- Beit Gan (1903; next to Yavne'el)
- Atlit (1903)
- Giv'at Ada (1903)
- Kfar Saba (1904)
