= Lev Levanda =

Russian author (1935-1888)

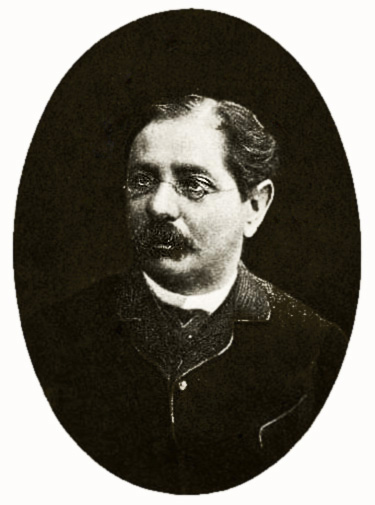
- Born: Yehuda Leyb Levanda; June 1835; Minsk, Russian Empire
- Died: 18 June 1888 (aged 52–53); St. Petersburg, Russian Empire
- Education: Vilna Rabbinical School
- Occupation: Writer
- Writing career
- Pen name: Ladnev
- Language: Russian and Yiddish

Lev Levanda (Russian: Лев Осипович Леванда, romanized: Lev Osipovich Levanda, Yiddish: יהודה לייב לעוואַנדאַ, romanized: Yehuda Leyb Levanda; June 1835 – 18 June 1888) was a Russian author, belletrist, and publicist. His sketches were often published under the pen name Ladnev.

Levnada's literary work made him a leading figure in the circles of the Russian-Jewish intelligentsia. Originally a vocal proponent of the assimilation of Jews into Russian culture, Levanda became a strong supporter of their emigration to Palestine following the 1881–82 pogroms across the Russian Empire.

== Biography ==
=== Early life ===
Lev Levanda was born to a poor Jewish family in Minsk, Russian Empire (now Belarus). After spending three years at a state-sponsored school for Jews in his hometown, he entered the Vilna Rabbinical School in 1849, graduating in 1854 with a teacher's diploma. He thereafter returned to Minsk and was appointed a teacher at the government-run Jewish school. He taught there until 1860, when he was appointed uchonyi evrei ('adviser on Jewish affairs') to the Governor-General of Vilna, Mikhail N. Muravyov, a position he held until his death. In this role he assisted with programs to study Jewish life and edited Russian-language state textbooks for Jewish children. Levanda was instrumental in exposing false witnesses in a ritual-murder trial of several Jews from the shtetl of Shavl in 1861.

=== Vilna ===
Upon his arrival in Vilna, Levanda participated in the publication of the first Russian-language Jewish journal, Rassvet ('Dawn'), edited in Odessa by Osip Rabinovich, as well as its successor, Zion. His first novel, Shop of Imported Far-East Groceries, appeared in the pages of Rassvet in 1860. Levanda's The Warehouse of Groceries: Pictures of the Jewish Life, a work of belles lettres, was serialized in Rassvet, and published as a book in 1869 (a Hebrew translation was published five years later).

A supporter of the Russification of Eastern European Jewry, in 1864 Levanda was appointed editor of the region's official newspaper, Vilenskie gubernskie vedomosti ('Vilna Provincial News'), with a mandate to justify Muravyov's russifying campaign. Following the banning of Rassvet and Zion, he began to contribute under a pseudonym to a number of liberal Russian newspapers in St. Petersburg and Vilna, including the Sankt-Peterburgskie Vedomosti. In a series of articles, Levanda argued that the acquisition of civil rights hinged on the assimilation of the Jewish masses into Russian culture.

In the 1870s and 1880s, he contributed to the Russian Jewish journals Evreiskaia biblioteka (Еврейская библиотека, 'The Jewish Library'), Russkii evrei ('The Russian Jew'), and Voskhod ('Sunrise'). In 1876 he published a collection of sketches under the title "Sketches of the Past," followed later by a number of stories, such as "The Four Tutors" and "The Amateur Performance", in Russkii evrei, Yevreiskoe Obozrenie ('The Jewish Review'), and Voskhod. He published over twenty articles on Jewish life in Poland with the title "The Vistula Chronicle" in Russkii evrei. Other works of this period include "Essays of the Past" (1875), originally published in 1870 in Den ('The Day'); "Types and Silhouettes" (1881); and the historical novels The Wrath and Mercy of the Tycoon (1885) and Avraam Yosefovich (1887).

He published his best-known work, Seething Times, set in the northern Pale of Settlement against the background of the Polish Uprising of 1863, in three instalments between 1871 and 1873 in Evreiskaia biblioteka. In the novel, young Westernized Jews were urged by the hero, Sarin, to abandon Polish orientation (after 500 years of unhappy experience with the Poles) and become Russians. The book was released as a book in 1875 under the title Seething Times: The Novel of the Last Polish Uprising.

=== Final years ===
Levanda's political views changed dramatically following the 1881–82 pogroms across the Russian Empire, and the Russian state's hostile indifference to them. With the subsequent rapid growth in Polish anti-Semitism, Levanda began writing about the rebuilding of a Jewish state in Palestine. He became a leading activist for the Hibbat Zion movement and maintained close links with Leon Pinsker, author of the influential Zionist manifesto Auto-Emancipation. In "The Essence of the So-Called 'Palestine' Movement" (1884), Levanda discussed the ideas of Jewish self-determination as a "practical solution" to a "vicious cycle," and in 1885 published an important reconsideration of the position of the Jews in Russia, entitled "On 'Assimilation'".

In early 1887, his mental condition began to deteriorate sharply, showing signs of major depressive disorder. As a result, he was transported that May to St. Petersburg, where he was placed in a psychiatric hospital. He died there less than a year later.

== Reception and legacy ==
Although a popular writer, contemporary critics considered Levanda untalented and unrefined.

An elegy in Levanda's memory, in Yiddish and Russian with accompaniment on the piano, was published in Vilna upon his death.

== Partial bibliography ==
- Депо бакалейных товаровъ: картины еврейского быта [The Warehouse of Groceries: Pictures of the Jewish Life] (in Russian). Vilna: Romm. 1869.
- ר׳ שלומעלע: דער פער פון דער קהלה נ׳ [Mr. Shlomele] (in Yiddish). Vilna: Romm. 1870.
- המרכלת: אוצר מרכלת מגרים; או, תמונת היהדות [The Gossip] (in Hebrew). Odessa: Olrikh et Shultse. 1874.
- Польный хронологический сборник законов и положений касающихся Евреев [Complete Chronological Collection of Laws and Regulations Concerning Jews] (in Russian). St. Petersburg: K. V. Trubnikova. 1874.
- Горячее время: роман из послѣдняго польскаго возстанія [Hot Times] (in Russian). St. Peterburg: A. E. Landau. 1875.
- Очерки прошлаго [Sketches of the Past] (in Russian). St. Petersburg: A. E. Landau. 1875.
- Мировоззрение талмудистов: свод религиозно-нравственных поучений в выдержках из главнейших книг раввинской письменности [The Talmudic Worldview] (in Russian). Moscow: Ladomir. 1994 [1876]. (With S. J. Fuenn and Kh. L. Katsenelenbogen.)
- Виленская жизнь: фельетонные этюды [Vilna Life] (in Russian). Vilna: A. G. Syrkin. 1878.
- Исповѣдь дѣльца: роман в 2-х частях [Confessions of a Lover: A Novel in 2 Parts] (in Russian). St. Petersburg: Tuzov. 1880.
- Большой ремизъ: романъ изъ коммерческой жизни евреевъ [A Large Fine] (in Russian). St. Petersburg: L. Berman and G. Rabinovich. 1881.
- Гнев и милость магната [The Wrath and Mercy of the Tycoon] (in Russian). 1885.
- Авраамъ Іезофовичъ: историческая повѣсть первой половины XVI вѣка [Avraam Yosefovich] (in Russian). 1887.
- Скромныя бесѣды о прошлогоднемъ снѣгѣ: О томъ, какъ гора родила мышь [Modest Talk About Last Year's Dream] (in Russian). Ekaterinoslav: Pechatnya Shparbera. 1894.
- אברהם בן יוסף [Abraham ben Joseph] (in Hebrew). Warsaw: Toshiyah. 1901.
- עיר ובהלות: ספור מחיי אחינו במדינת ליטה במאה העברה [City and Panic] (in Hebrew). Warsaw: B. Tursh. 1903.
- אין שטורם: ראָמאַן [In Turbulent Times] (in Yiddish). Warsaw: Tsentral. 1912.
- A groyser remiz roman אַ גרויסער רעמיז: ראָמאַן [A Large Fine] (in Yiddish). Warsaw: Tsentral. 1914.
- דער פוילישער מאגנאט [The Polish Magnate] (in Yiddish). Warsaw: Tsentral. 1923.
