= Saul Pinchas Rabbinowicz =

Jewish scholar

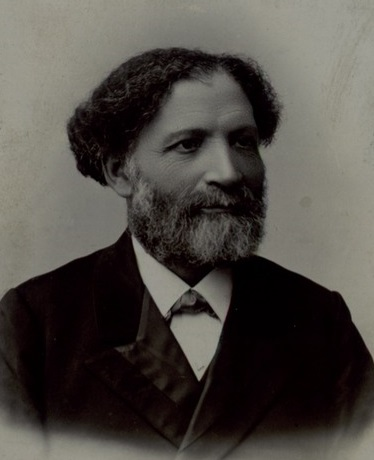
- Born: 8 April 1845
- Died: 6 December 1910 (aged 65); Frankfurt
- Occupation: Historian

Saul Pinchas Rabbinowicz (Saul Pinehas Rabbinowicz / Rabbinowitsch / Rabinowitz; Akronym: Schepher / SchePheR; * 1845 in Tauroggen; † 1910 in Frankfurt am Main) was a Jewish scholar, writer and Hebrew translator, and a member of the Lovers of Zion movement.

== Biography ==
Rabbinowicz was one of the co-organizers of the Katowice Conference in 1884, was the first secretary of the Union of Hovevei Zion Associations in Russia. Rabbinowicz rejected Herzl's Zionist movement, and saw the main goal of the Hovevei Zion to target Herzl's followers in favor of immediate practical work in Palestine. Saul was a leading "Palestinophile" of German Jews and favored emancipation. Rabbinowicz worked with Leon Pinsker.

He translated Graetz's History of the Jews into Hebrew (Warsaw 1888). This reached a wide audience and caused a considerable amount of controversy and criticism.

He was a mentor of Ze'ev Yavetz.

Saul Pinchas Rabbinowicz was the father of the socialist Sarah Rabinowitz, also known as Sonja Lerch. Another, older daughter named Lydia is described by Victor Klemperer as a "fanatical Zionist" who no longer wanted to associate with him after she found out that he had converted.

== Works ==
- Dibre ha-Yamim li-Bene Yisrael, Warsaw, 1890, translation of Grätz's Geschichte der Juden into Hebrew
- Moẓa'e Golah, a history of the exiled Spanish Jews and of their literature
- R. Yom-Ṭob Lipman Zunz, Warsaw, 1896, an exhaustive biography of Zunz
- a monograph on Zacharias Frankel (ib. 1898), and several minor works.

== Jewish Encyclopedia bibliography ==
- Sefer Zikkaron, pp. 103–104, Warsaw, 1890;
- Zeitlin, Bibl. Post-Mendels. pp. 282–283;
- Lippe, Bibliographisches Lexicon, ii. 223–225, v. 298–300;
- Ha-Ẓefirah, 1880, Nos. 8–17.
