= Samuel Mohilever =

Belarusian rabbi

Rabbi Samuel Mohilever
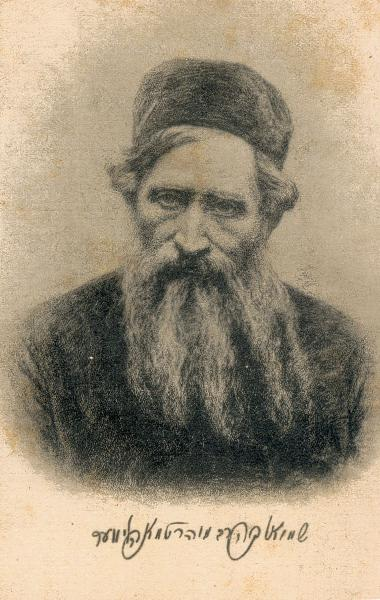
- Rabbi Samuel Mohilever

Personal life
- Born: 1824 Głębokie, Russian Empire
- Died: 1898 (aged 73–74)
- Education: Volozhin Yeshiva
- Known for: Founding Hovevei Zion movement, promoting Zionism
- Occupation: Rabbi, Pioneer of Religious Zionism

Religious life
- Religion: Judaism

Jewish leader
- Post: Rabbi of Białystok

Samuel Mohilever (1824 – 1898), also Shmuel Mohilever, was a rabbi, pioneer of Religious Zionism and one of the founders of the Hovevei Zion movement.

== Biography ==
Mohilever was born in Głębokie (now Hlybokaye, Belarus) and studied in the Volozhin Yeshiva.

Mohilever advocated for application of principles of German Orthodoxy in Russia. This included creation of trade schools, training in the local language (Russian), and basic education in secular studies.

After the pogroms following the May Laws, he helped found the Hovevei Zion in Warsaw.

Mohilever was active in the propagandist and organizational affairs as well as labors on behalf of colonization in Palestine. In 1882 he went to Paris to meet a young Edmond James de Rothschild, and convinced him to take an interest in the struggling settlers in Israel and to financially support a settlement called Ekron (now Mazkeret Batya).

Mohilever was made the rabbi of Białystok in 1883. He dedicated himself to promoting Zionism by convincing Białystok's Jews to move to Petah Tikva, then a struggling settlement.

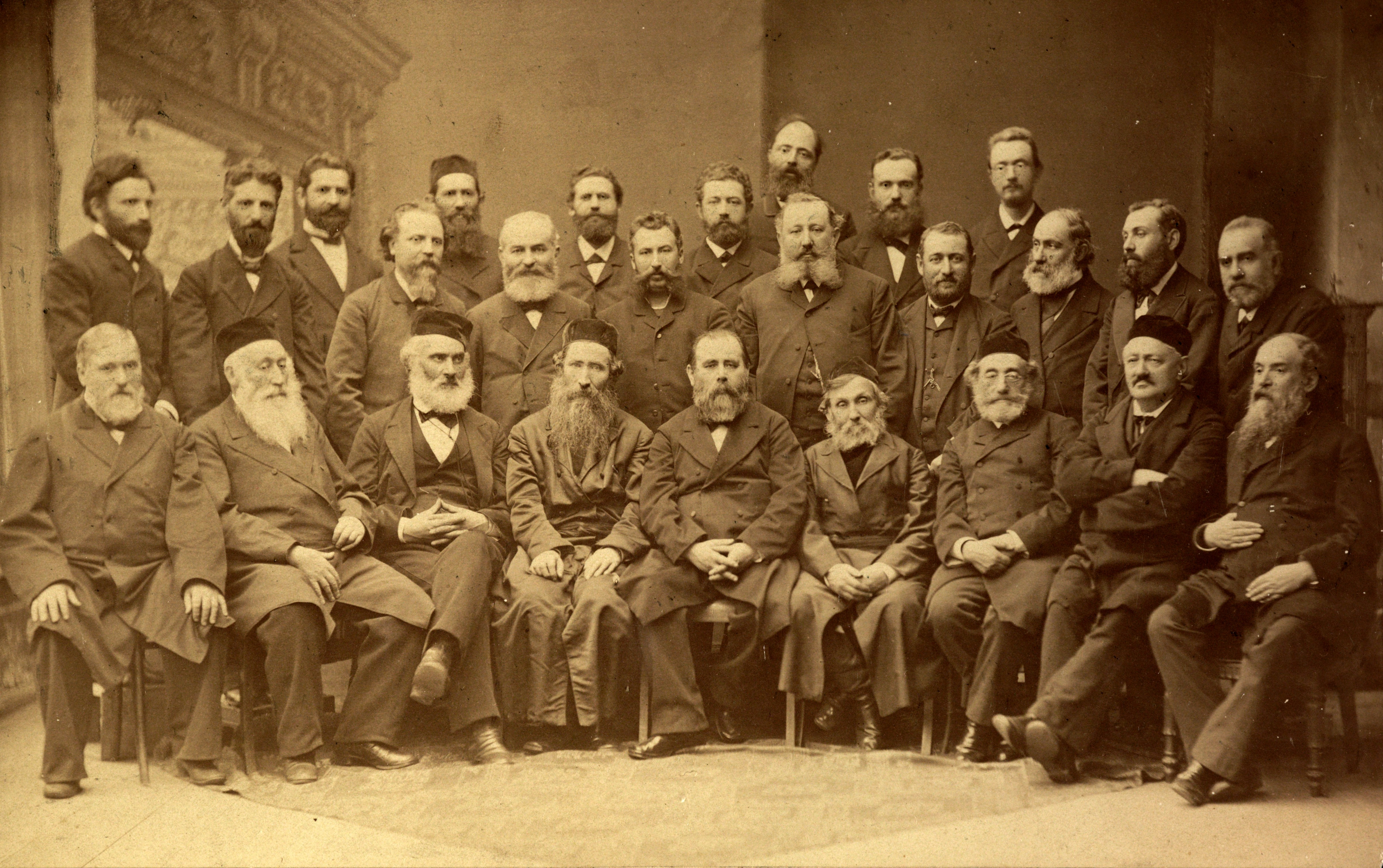
Participants of the Katowice Conference, 1884. In the center of the front row Rabbi Samuel Mohilever and Leon Pinsker

In 1893 there were a series of disagreements between Rabbi Mohilever and the main offices of Chovevei L'Tzion in Odessa, which was largely secularist and directed by Leo Pinsker. This led to a decision for Chovevei L'Tzion to make another center under Mohilever's leadership. This new branch was named Mizrachi, (מִזְרָחִי, a notarikon (Hebrew abbreviation) of מרכז רוחני, merkaz ruhani – "spiritual centre"). Their task was to educate orthodox Jews about the concept of Zionism. But despite the religious differences, Rabbi Mohilever made the decision to remain part of the Chovevei L'Tzion movement. Nonetheless, Mohilever put constant pressure on the national movement to meet with the requirements of the Orthodox Jews.

In 1884, Mohilever was elected to the presidency of the Hovevei Zion conference, with Leon Pinsker serving as chairman. Mohilever served as chairman in the 1887 and 1889 conferences. Many of his contributions were of a religious nature - Mohilever ensured that Jewish farming in Palestine complied with Jewish laws and tradition by setting up a rabbinical committee to oversee it.

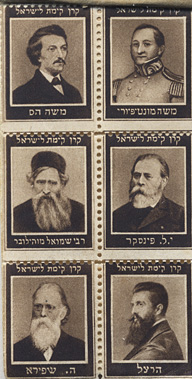
Stamps with inscribed portraits, including Samuel Mohilever, ca. 1916. In the collection of the Jewish Museum of Switzerland.

In 1897, Mohilever sent a message to the First Zionist Congress: "It is essential," he wrote, "that the Congress unite all 'Sons of Zion' who are true to our cause to work in complete harmony and fraternity, even if there be among them differences of opinion regarding religion."

Rabbi Mohilever and his colleagues continued their work, especially among Orthodox Jews, and as a result, Mizrachi became the foundation of the Religious Zionist movement. In 1902, four years after Rabbi Shmuel’s death, Mizrachi officially joined the Zionist Organization.

When, in 1901, Rabbi Yitzchak Yaacov Reines and several other of Mohilever's disciples re-established the organization, they did so with the same stance, spirit, and name. Mohilever had successfully inspired the amalgamation of traditional Jewish orthodoxy with practical Zionism.

His last letter to the Jews of Russia before his death urged them to work to achieve a deep attachment to the commandment to settle in Israel, which he said is “the foundation of the existence of our people.”

The kibbutz Gan Shmuel was named after Mohilever.
