= Odessa Committee =

The Odessa Committee, officially known as the Society for the Support of Jewish Farmers and Artisans in Syria and Palestine, was a charitable, pre-Zionist organization based in Odesa, then part of the Russian Empire. It supported Jewish migration to the region of Palestine, also known as the Land of Israel in the Jewish tradition, which was then in Ottoman Syria, part of the Ottoman Empire.

== History ==
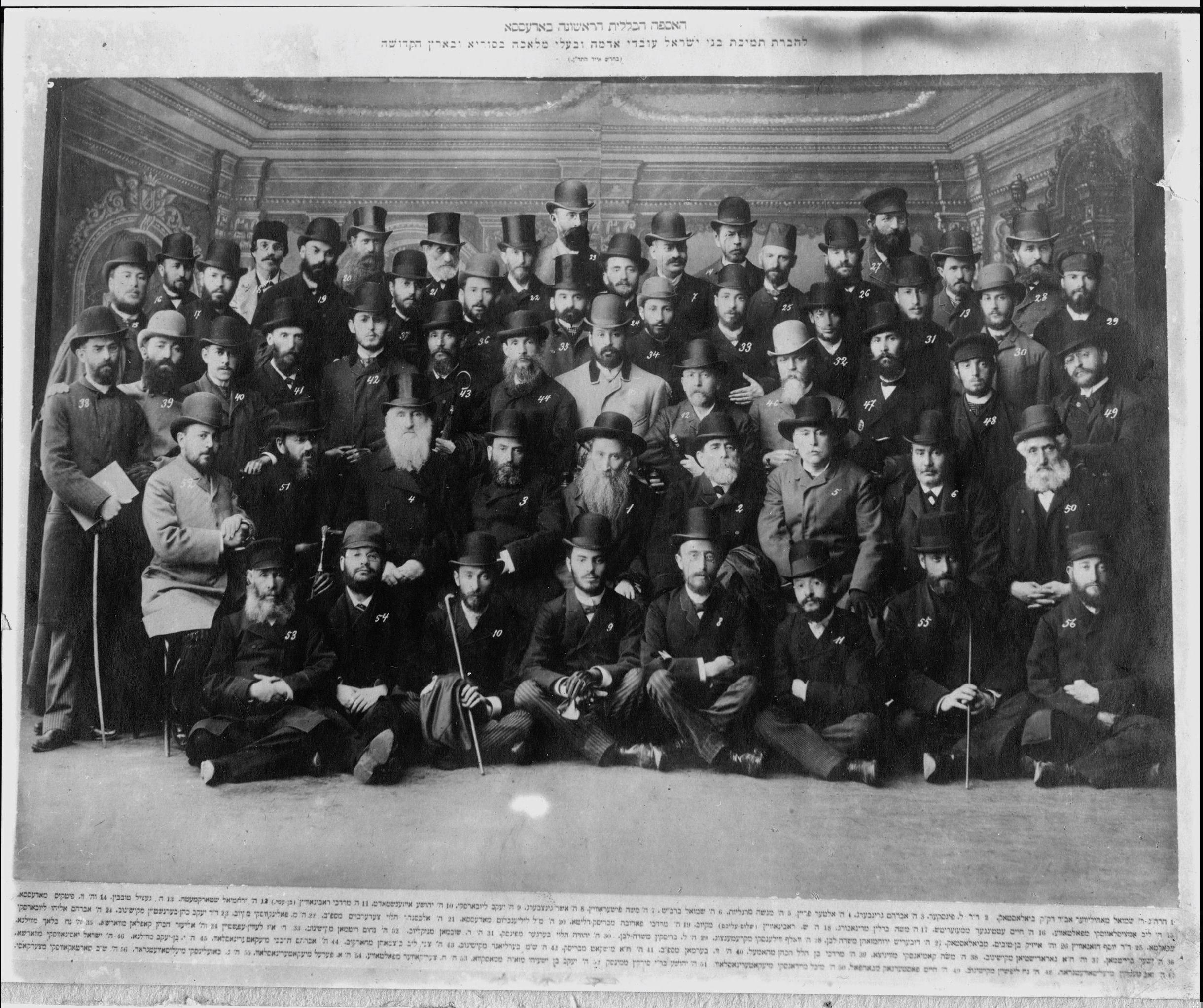
The first general assembly of the Odessa Committee, 1890

The pogroms of 1881–1884 and the May Laws of 1882 gave impetus to political activism among Russian Jews and mass emigration. More than two million Jews fled Russia between 1881 and 1920, the vast majority emigrating to the United States. The Tsarist government sporadically encouraged Jewish emigration. In 1882, members of Bilu and Hovevei Zion made what came to be known the First Aliyah to Palestine, then a part of the Ottoman Empire. Initially, these organizations were not official, and in order to attain a legally recognized framework, a Jewish organization had to be registered as a charity in various European countries and the United States that provided most of the funding. After arduous negotiations, the Russian government approved the establishment of the "Society for the Support of Jewish Farmers and Artisans in Syria and Palestine" early in 1890. It was based in Odessa (now in Ukraine), headed by Leon Pinsker, and dedicated to practical aspects of establishing Jewish agricultural settlements in the Palestine.

It helped to establish Rehovot and Hadera and rehabilitate Mishmar HaYarden in early 1890s.

Before the First Zionist Congress in 1897, the Odessa Committee counted over 4,000 members. When the Zionist Organization was founded (1897), most of the Hovevei Zion societies joined it. The Odessa Committee continued to function until it was closed in 1913.
