= Katowice Conference =

Hovevei Zion convention in Kattowitz, Germany 1884

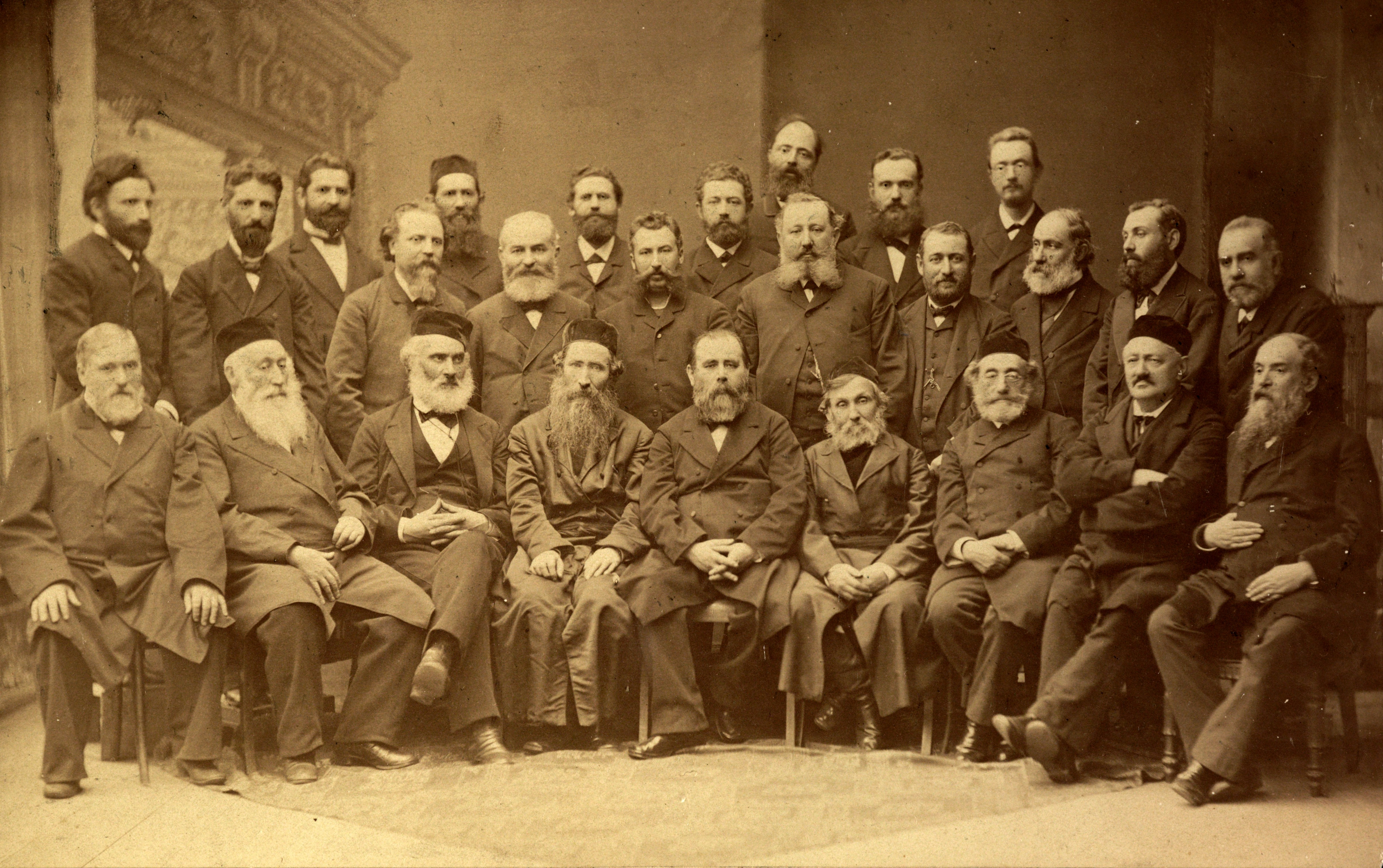
Participants of Katowice Conference

The Katowice Conference (also known as the Kattowitz Conference) was a convention of Hovevei Zion groups from various countries held in Kattowitz, Germany (today: Katowice, Poland) in November, 1884. It was assembled to address the need of a Jewish state and to develop a plan for the creation of a Jewish state. The original date for the conference was chosen to coincide with the 100th anniversary of the birth of Moses Montefiore.

The conference was chaired by Leon Pinsker and attended by 32 people, of which 22 were from Russia. It was the first public meeting of Zionists, preceding the First Zionist Congress by 13 years.

== History ==
The Hovevei Zion movement began in Russia and Romania and slowly spread out to the rest of the Jewish world. Important early members were: Chaim Weizmann, Ahad Ha'am, Menachem Ussishkin, Israel Zangwill, and Leo Motzkin. The Hovevei Zion organizations were usually small and independent. In 1882, Leon (Yehuda Leib) Pinsker, influenced by a string of pogroms in his town of Odessa, anonymously published the pamphlet Auto-Emancipation. In it, Pinsker outlined his belief that the root cause of anti-Semitism was that the Jews were a people without a nation of their own. He called on Jews to organize themselves for the establishment of a Jewish homeland.

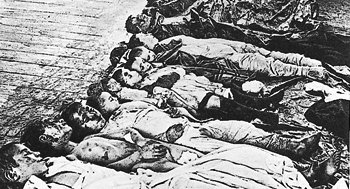
Photo believed to show the victims, mostly Jewish children, of a 1905 pogrom in Yekaterinoslav (today's Dnipro).

Waves of pogroms in the Russian Empire from 1881 to 1884 and the anti-Semitic May Laws of 1882 introduced by Tsar Alexander III of Russia, deeply affected Jewish communities and prompted the Hovevei Zion movement to take action and organize the conference. The growing separation of Jewish communities due to sudden freedom and assimilation also was a cause for action, as many feared that Judaism's ancient sense of unified nationality would disappear.

With the beginning of the movement to settle Eretz Israel in the early 1880s and the establishment of Ḥovivei Zion societies in various countries, the need to create a unifying and coordinating center for the early Zionist activities was expressed. The only country in which a central committee functioned was Romania. An attempt to found a central committee in Russia, made at a small conference in Bialystok in 1883, produced no results; other attempts also failed. In the end Leon Pinsker, Moses Leib Lilienblum, Hermann Schapira, Max Emmanuel Mandelstamm, and others took the initiative to convene a conference. Following the suggestion of David Gordon, Katowice, then in Germany, was chosen as the site for the conference. Its date was fixed for Oct. 27, 1884, the 100th anniversary of the birth of Moses Montefiore, at the suggestion of the Warsaw society. The conference was intended primarily for the Ḥibbat Zion societies in Russia, as the movement in Romania had significantly weakened. There were very few Ḥibbat Zion societies in other countries. As delegates from Russia encountered difficulties in arriving at the appointed time, the conference's opening was postponed until November 6.

== Participants ==
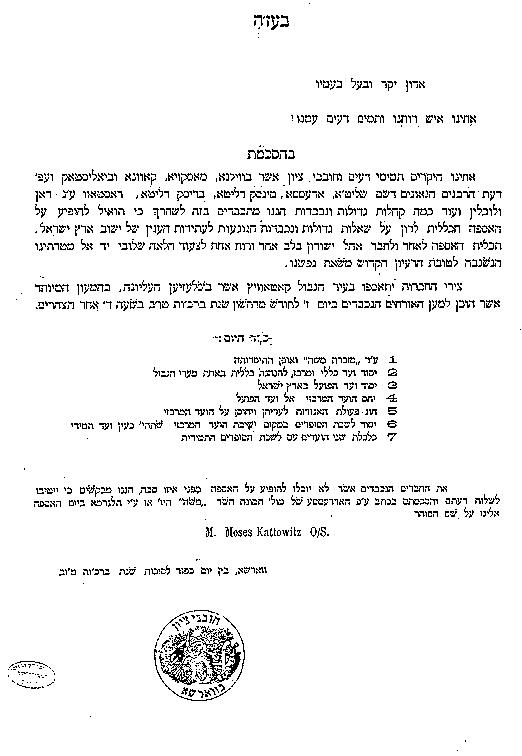
Invitation to Katowice Conference

Twenty-two delegates came to the conference from Russia and ten from other countries. One from France, one from Romania, two from the United Kingdom, and the rest from Germany. At the request of the Warsaw society, many other groups submitted proposals for organization and action. Schapira, who could not attend, sent a telegram to point out the importance of establishing financial institutions, including a general Jewish fund, whose primary task would be to redeem land in Eretz Israel.

== Decisions ==
At the proposal of Pinsker the conference established an institution named Agudat Montefiore to promote farming among the Jews and support Jewish settlement in Eretz Israel. A decision was reached to send immediately 10,000 francs to Petaḥ Tikvah and 2,000 rubles for Yesud ha-Ma'alah. It was also decided to send a reliable emissary to Eretz Israel to investigate the standing of the colonies there. Nineteen members were elected to the central committee, including Leon Pinsker (chairman), Samuel Mohilewer (president), Kalonymus Ze'ev Wissotzky, Judah Leib ben Moses Kalischer (the son of Ẓevi Hirsch Kalischer), Max Emmanuel Mandelstamm, Ch. Wollrauch, and others.

At the first meeting of the central committee, which took place at the time of the conference, it was decided that two committees, one in Odessa and the other in Warsaw, should temporarily manage the organization's affairs. The central committee, to be headed by Pinsker, was to reside temporarily in Odessa, and a subcommittee was to be established in Warsaw, subject to Pinsker's authority. Kalischer announced his presentation of land acquired by his father near Rachel's Tomb to the central committee.
