= Isaac Rülf =

Jewish teacher and philosopher (1831–1902)

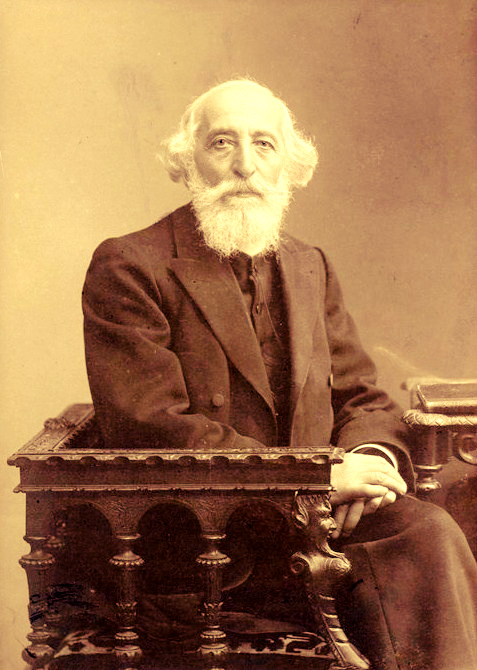
Isaac Rülf in 1890

Isaac (Yitzhak) Rülf (February 10, 1831 – September 18, 1902) was a Jewish teacher, journalist and philosopher. He became widely known for his aid work and as a prominent early Zionist.

Rülf was born in Rauischholzhausen, Hesse, Germany. He received a teaching certificate in 1849, became an assistant to the county rabbi and then taught in other small communities. He received his rabbinical certificate in 1854 from the University of Marburg and his Ph.D in 1865 at the University of Rostock. That year he became the rabbi of Memel, East Prussia.

Rülf first found fame for his part in the 'Jankel Widutzky case' in which an English minister attempted to convert Widutzky, a Jewish youth, in Memel. Rülf attacked the missionary in the article Jankel Widutzky, der den Händen der Judenbekehrungs Mission entzogene Knabe (1867), sparking indignation in Germany. Widutzky was thus not converted and entered Rabbinical college.

== Rabbi of Memel ==
Memel, in addition to being an important port on the Baltic, was a frontier town and a crossroads between East and West – it lay at the tip of East Prussia, on the border of Russia's Lithuanian province (the Kovner Gubernie).

The Jewish community in Memel was divided between Western Jews (Prussian/German) and the Eastern Jews (Polish/Russian/Lithuanian), with the different groups having their own institutions and leaders. This mirrored a continent-wide division based largely on the Easterners' fixation on traditional religious education and their perceived ignorance of worldly affairs. Rülf arrived as rabbi of the German Jews but tried to unite the communities. Beginning in the late 1860s with his relief works, Rülf gained an international reputation for his assistance to Russian Jews. Thereafter, he strove to establish himself as expert on Eastern European Jewry and as a spokesman and intercessor on their behalf. He would use the press and public opinion as leverage for this activity, making the most important change in the tactics of intercession during the 19th century.

To supplement his small pay as rabbi, Rülf became an editor of the Memeler Dampfboot, the city's largest liberal newspaper. From 1872 until he left the city, he was editor-in-chief. In 1862 Rülf and Rabbi Yisrael Salanter founded a chevra kadisha together in Memel. In 1879 Rülf created an Armenschule, or school for poor children and in 1886 Rülf directed the funding and building of a synagogue for the German Jews. In 1875 for example, Rülf collected funds among the German Jews to assist the Lithuanian and Russian Jews in building their Beth Midrash. In this way he won over the Eastern Jews who had first dismissed this “Doktor-Rabbiner” of the wealthier German minority. In 1871 he and two collaborators caused a Jewish hospital to be built in Memel. It drew so many patients to the city that in 1896 a new, larger building was put up. It has been restored and still stands today, in use as a hospital, at its scenic hilltop site.

The early 1880s saw a series of efforts to force Jews out of Memel in increasing numbers. Rülf raised a great deal of money for the exiles' travel and living expenses. Many of these people were given enough to reach the United States. In 1885, Rülf used his political contacts in Germany to prevent a final mass expulsion of Jews from Memel.

In 1898, Rülf retired from his position and moved with his family to Bonn, Germany.

== International aid work ==
Rülf travelled east to study the cruel conditions of Jewish life in Russia and Lithuania. In response he wrote My Journey to Kovno (1869) and Three Days in Jewish Russia (1882). During this time he received reports, smuggled over the Lithuanian border, on the Russian pogroms. In Memel these were translated into German and sent to England, where they later appeared in two long articles in the London Times on January 11 and 13, 1882. Russian Jews were even able to escape to Germany through an underground directed by Rülf.

Rülf established and headed the “Permanent Committee for Helping Russian Jews” in the 1880s. He organized a massive relief campaign in Germany for Russian Jews, and tens of thousands came to know him as 'Rabbi Hülf' or 'Dr. Hülf', meaning 'Help'. Rülf saved around 30,000 Jews from starvation during Lithuania's 1867-1868 famine. To this end, he collected an amazing 630,000 Mark in Germany, transferring it to 230 Lithuanian settlements over a year and a half.

== Zionism ==
Rülf was struck by the fact that Russian Jews saw themselves simply as Jews, in contrast with 'Western' Jews who identified with their nation of residence. In 1881, he had a conversion to this view of Jewish identity. Within months, Russian Jew Leon Pinsker published Auto-Emancipation, calling for a Jewish state in response to anti-Semitism. Rülf agreed with the basic idea but little else, compelling him to write Aruchas Bas-Ammi (1883). There he went further than Pinsker, specifying that the Jewish homeland must be in Palestine and its language must be Hebrew, and calling for immediate purchase of land and immigration to Palestine.

Three years later, Rülf's was one of the first portraits to appear in Kneset Israel, a great distinction. Correspondents over these years included Pinsker and Nathan Birnbaum, coiner of the term Zionism. Rülf's letters and other writings are preserved in the Rülf Collection at the Central Zionist Archives in Jerusalem, Israel.

Rülf was hurt when, in 1896, Theodor Herzl was embraced as Zionism's international leader. That was the year in which Herzl published Der Judenstaat ("The Jewish State"). However, Rülf came to Herzl's defense against the anti-Zionist “Protest Rabbis” who impeded the First Zionist Congress, leveraging his considerable reputation and writing Declaration versus Declaration in the June 25, 1897 Die Welt. In 1898, Rülf introduced Herzl at the Second Zionist Congress at Basle, Switzerland.

In Memel, Rülf had been the mentor of David Wolffsohn, who went on to succeed Herzl as the second President of the World Zionist Organization. Wolffsohn came to Memel at age 17 from his Lithuanian hometown, and Rülf taught and greatly influenced him.

Late in life, Rülf attempted to warn European Jews of the dangers they faced from German anti-Semitism. In Topical Study, in the May 18, 1900 Die Welt, he wrote that the end of the century would not mean the end of the murder of millions of Jews. Less than fifty years later, his own children were unable to escape the Holocaust.

== Family and legacy ==
Isaac Rülf died in Bonn, four years after relocating there to continue his work in philosophy. His sons became personal friends of Konrad Adenauer, future first Chancellor of West Germany. The danger to Jews from Nazi power increased while Adenauer was mayor of Cologne, and Adenauer offered refuge to Rülf's son Benno at his family home in Rhöndorf. However, Adenauer was himself forced to flee and take refuge at a monastery. Benno and his wife traveled to the Netherlands but, according to a statement of his daughter Elizabeth, he was deported and killed in Auschwitz. Isaac's son Jacob committed suicide in Bonn before being deported.

A street in Tel Aviv, Israel, is named for Isaac Rülf.

== Books ==
Rülf published a five-volume work of philosophy, System of a New Metaphysics, in which he described his theories of theistic monism.

- Meine Reise nach Kowno (1869)

My Journey to Kovno

- Der Einheitsgedanke als Fundamentalbegriff (1880)
- Drei Tage in Jüdisch-Russland (1882)

Three Days in Jewish Russia

- Aruchas Bas-Ammi (1883)
- Wissenschaft des Weltgedankens and Wissenschaft der Gedankenwelt, System einer Neuen Metaphysik (2 vols., 1888)

(the first volumes of System of a New Metaphysics)

- Wissenschaft der Krafteinheit (1893)
- Das Erbrecht als Erbübel (1893)

Legacy Law as a Basic Evil

- Wissenschaft der Geisteseinheit (1898)
- Wissenschaft der Gotteseinheit (1903)

(final volume of philosophy, published posthumously)
