= Yitzchak Yaacov Reines =

Belarusian rabbi

Rabbi Yitzchak Yaacov Reines
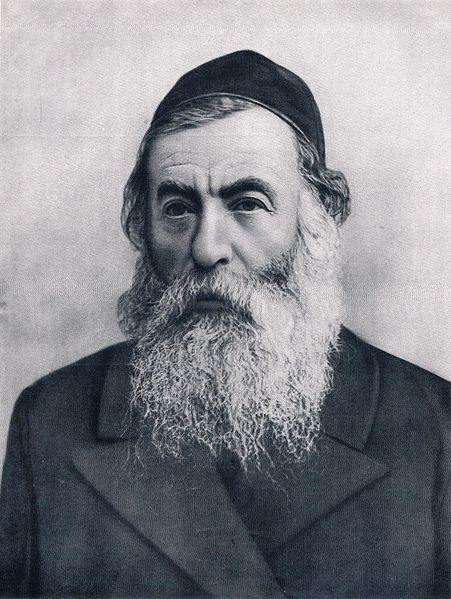
- Yitzchak Yaacov Reines

Personal life
- Born: October 27, 1839; Cheshvan 19, 5600 AM (Hebrew calendar) Karolin, Russian Empire (present-day Pinsk, Belarus)
- Died: August 20, 1915 (aged 75); Elul 10, 5675 AM (Hebrew calendar) Lida, Russian Empire (present-day Belarus)
- Children: Moses
- Parent: Rabbi Shlomo Naftali Reines

Religious life
- Religion: Judaism
- Denomination: Orthodox
- Position: Founder
- Organization: Mizrachi
- Semikhah: Volozhin Yeshiva

Yitzchak Yaacov Reines (Hebrew: יצחק יעקב ריינס, Isaac Jacob Reines), (October 27, 1839 – August 20, 1915) was a Lithuanian Orthodox rabbi and the founder of the Mizrachi Religious Zionist Movement, one of the earliest movements of Religious Zionism, as well as a correspondent of Theodor Herzl.

== Biography ==
Yitzchak Yaacov Reines, a descendant of Meir ben Isaac Katzenellenbogen, was born in Karolin (now a part of Pinsk, Belarus). He studied at the “Kollel Prushim” in Eishishok and earned semikhah at the Volozhin Yeshiva before becoming the rabbi of Saukenai, Lithuania, in 1867.

He then served as rabbi in Svencionys, where in 1882 he founded a yeshiva with a curriculum that included secular subjects. He also founded a modern yeshiva in Lida which attracted many students from throughout Russia. He named the yeshiva Torah Vodaas.

Reines wrote many books on rabbinic literature. Reines developed a rational approach to Talmud study in his Hotem Toknit a new plan for a modernized, logical method of studying the Talmud.

He was one of the rabbis and representative Jews who assembled in St. Petersburg in 1882 to consider plans for the improvement of the moral and material condition of the Jews in Russia, and there he proposed the substitution of his method for the one prevalent in the yeshivot.

His proposition being rejected, he founded a new yeshivah in which his plans were to be carried out. It provided a ten-year course, during which the student was to acquire the rabbinical knowledge necessary for ordination as a rabbi, and at the same time secure the secular education required of a government rabbi. Although the plan to supply Russian-speaking rabbis agreed in principle with the aims of the Russian government, there was so much Jewish opposition to his yeshivah that it was closed by the authorities after an existence of four years; all further attempts of Reines to reestablish it failed.

He was instrumental in the establishment of the first “kollel” perushim, for the purpose of subsidizing young married men studying for the rabbinate, under Rabbi Yitzchak Blazer.

In 1870, while rabbi of Lida, his son, Moses, was born. Moses Reines was the author of Jewish historical materials for the history of Jewish culture in Russia and for a history of the yeshivot in Russia. Moses died in Lida on March 7, 1891.

== Zionist activism ==
He was a member of the Hovevei Zion movement from its inception. Reines joined Rabbi Samuel Mohilever in proposing, ca. 1893, a Palestinian settlement that would synthesize Torah and labor. Mohilever coined the phrase, "Mercaz Ruchani" (religious center), abbreviated as "Mizrachi." Although the settlement did not succeed, Reines revived the Mizrachi name in 1901, for a new religious Zionist movement he founded.

Theodor Herzl recognized the need for rabbis to support the new Zionist movement, and Reines was one of the first rabbis to answer Herzl's call to become part of the movement. As such, Reines attended the Third Zionist Congress in 1899.

At the fifth Zionist congress (1901 in Basel), the Swiss and radical student faction threatened to turn the movement in a direction which would lead away from religion. In contrast, Reines’ religious Zionism faction became the strongest branch of the Zionist organization in Russia. He supported the British Uganda Program as a temporary measure to save Jews.

Most of his eastern and western European rabbinical colleagues remained opposed to political Zionism. In 1902, Reines published a book, Or Hadash al Tzion ("A New Light on Zion"). In it, he made a call to a Zionist Judaism for all Jews, one that included economic productivity and training, and a renewal of Jewish thought, emotion, and action.

He believed that whereas medieval Jews saw God's hand in nature, contemporary Jews see God's hand in history - especially surviving the exile to return to modern Zion. He commissioned Ze'ev Yavetz to write an appropriate work on Jewish history to use in education.

The same year, he organized a conference of the religious Zionist movement in Vilna, where the Mizrachi movement was founded. He was recognized as the movement's leader at its founding convention in Pressburg (today's Bratislava, Slovakia) in 1902.

In 1905, Reines accomplished his own personal dream, with the establishment of a yeshiva in Lida where both secular and religious subjects were taught.

Reines was succeeded by Judah Leib Fishman, a preacher (maggid) and rabbi who met Rabbi Reines in 1900 and took part in the movement's founding conference in Vilna. He participated in the second and subsequent Zionist congresses and was a member of the Zionist General Council. Fishman, who changed his name to Yehuda Leib Maimon, settled in the Land of Israel in 1913, and would eventually become the first Minister of Religious Affairs of the modern state of Israel.

== Published works ==
- Reines, Isaac Jacob. Sefer ha-`arakhim. `Arakhim `arukhim, be-derekh ha-hegyoni veha-mehkar ha-pilosofi `al ha-adam veha-teva`, `al ha-dat veha-le'om, `al Yisra'el ve-tikvotav, `al Erets-Yisra'el ve-binyanah ve-`al kol ha-`inyanim ha `omdim be-rum ha-`olam ha-enoshi veha-Yisre`eli me-et ... Yitshak Ya`akov Reines. Mesudar li-defus ve-yotse la-or mi-tokh ketav-yad `al-yede beno ... Avraham Dov Ber Reines. Pp. viii, 343. (New York, 1926).
- Reines, Isaac Jacob. `Edut be-Ya`akov : she'elot u-teshuvot, hakirot u-ve'urim be-`inyene `edut, pp. 515. (Jerusalem: Mosad ha-Rav Kook, c. 2000).
- Notes on ’Edut bi-Yehoshef of his father-in-law (Vilna, 1866)
- ’Edut be-Ya’akob on testimony (ib. 1872)
- Sha’are Orah on Haggadah and Midrash (ib. 1886)
- Orim Gedolim on Halakah (ib. 1887)
- Nod shel Dema’ot - eulogies and funeral sermons (ib. 1891)
- Or Shib’at ha-Yamim (ib. 1896)
- Orah ve-Shimhah (with a preface explaining Zionism from the Orthodox point of view)
- Or Hadash ‘al Ziyyon - a refutation of the arguments which are advanced by the Haredim against Zionism (ib. 1902).
