= Moshe Leib Lilienblum =

Jewish scholar (1843–1910)

- משה לייב ליליינבלום
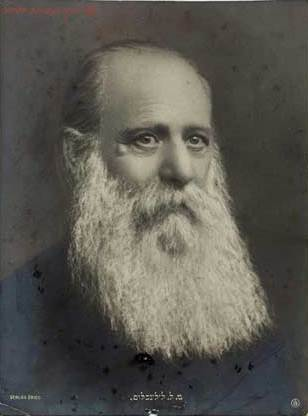
- Born: October 22, 1843; Keidany, Kovno Governorate
- Died: February 12, 1910 (aged 66); Odessa, Russian Empire
- Movement: Hovevei Zion

Signature
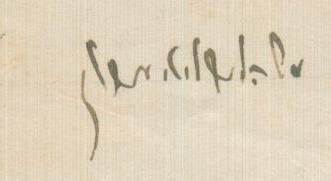

Moshe Leib Lilienblum (Yiddish: משה לייב לילינבלום; October 22, 1843, in Keidany, Kovno Governorate – February 12, 1910, in Odessa) was a Jewish scholar and author. He also used the pseudonym Zelophehad Bar-Hushim (Hebrew: צלפחד בר־חושים). Lilienbloom was one of the leaders of the early Zionist movement Hovevei Zion.

== Biography ==
Moshe Yehuda Leib Lilienblum was the son of R. Zevi, a poor cooper. From his father, he learned the calculation of the course of the stars in their relation to the Hebrew calendar. His maternal grandfather, who was a teacher, also contributed to his early education. At the age of thirteen, he organized a society of boys for the study of En Ya'aqob; and at the age of fifteen he married and settled at Vilkomir. A change in the fortunes of his father-in-law threw him upon his own resources, and in 1865, Lilienblum established a yeshivah in Vilna and another the following year.

== Judaism and the Jewish question ==
Changes affecting the Jewish community over the years, however, wrought a great change in Lilienblum's attitude toward Judaism and the Jewish Question. Initially, he had read the writings of the Maskilim, the leaders of Haskalah, particularly those of Mapu and M. A. Ginzburg. These produced in him a feeling of dissatisfaction with traditional Talmudic studies and an abhorrence for the ignorance and superstition surrounding him; he decided, therefore, to combat these faults. In an article entitled Orḥot ha-Talmud, in Ha-Meliẓ, 1868, he arraigned the superstitious beliefs and practises of his people, demanded the reform of Judaism, and insisted upon the necessity of establishing a "closer connection between religion and life." This article, and others of the same nature to follow, stirred up the Jewish communities in Russia, and a storm of indignation against him arose among the more traditionalist Orthodox; he was denounced as a freethinker and his continued residence in Wilkomir became impossible. In 1869, he went to Odessa where he intended to prepare himself for the university, but he was compelled to give up that idea.

The anti-Jewish riots of 1880 and 1881, however, aroused in Lilienblum a consciousness of the unsafe position of the Jews "in exile," and he wrote of his apprehensions in an article entitled Obshcheyevreiski Vopros i Palestina (in Razsvyet, 1881, Nos. 41, 42); in it he points to the reestablishment of the Jews in Palestine as the only solution of the Jewish question. This article did not remain without results; some hailed the idea as practical, and set themselves to realize it. In 1883, a committee was organized at Odessa for the colonization of Palestine, Lilienblum serving as ṣecretary and Dr. Leon Pinsker, author of Auto-Emancipation, as president. With the Hibbat Zion conference in Katowice, in which Lilienblum took an earnest and energetic part as secretary, representatives of European Jewry met and discussed the first plans for colonization in Palestine, a foundation stone was laid for the Zionist movement.

Lilienblum's activity thus covers two distinct periods in his thinking. In the first period, he followed the example of the Maskilim and the Haskalah and demanded the reform of Judaism; he differed however from the Maskilim in that he was much less extravagant, his style being free from the flowery meliẓah used by them, and his ideas being marked by sobriety and clarity. His Orḥot ha-Talmud, mentioned above, and his autobiography, Ḥaṭṭot Ne'urim (The Sins of Youth; Vienna, 1876), contain a description of his material and spiritual struggles; both made a marked impression upon the earlier period. His influence in the second period, that of Jewish national reawakening, in which he actively participated, also was due to this characteristic style. In his article on the Jewish question and Palestine in 1881, as well as in his later O Vozrozhdenii Yevreiskovo Naroda (Odessa, 1883), which includes the former and other essays of a similar character, he clearly and soberly presents the anomalous position held by the Jewish people among the nations in which they lived and logically demonstrates their hopelessness except through national independence.

== Published works ==
Lilienblum also wrote:

- Ḳehal Refa'im, a poem describing the different types of Russian Jewry of the time, as they appear in the nether world (Odessa, 1870)
- Olam ha-Tohu, on some phases of Hebrew literature (in Ha-Shaḥar, 1873)
- Biḳḳoret Kol Shire Gordon, on J. L. Gordon as a poet (in Meliẓ Eḥad Mini Elef, St. Petersburg, 1884)
- Zerubbabel, historical drama in Yiddish (Odessa, 1888)
- "Derek la-'Abor Golim," a history of the Hovevei Zion movement up to the time of the ratification by the Russian government of the committee for the colonization of Palestine (Warsaw, 1899)
- Derek Teshubah, an addition to Ḥaṭṭot Ne'urim, describing the transition of the author from the negative period of the Haskalah to the positive period of national reawakening
- Pyat Momentov Zhizhni Moiseya (in Russian; Warsaw, 1900), a psychological analysis of some important moments in the life of Moses
- Lilienblum also edited Kawweret, a collection of articles in Hebrew (Odessa, 1890), and the Luaḥ Aḥiasaf, 1901. He was the author of a number of other articles, of which the most important is O Neobkhodimosti Reform v Yevreiskoi Religii (in Voskhod, 1882–83).

== Commemoration ==
Kfar Malal, a moshav in central Israel, is named for Moshe Leib Lilienblum, based on his initials, MLL. In addition, several streets in Jerusalem, Haifa and Ramat Gan, Lilienblum Street in South Tel Aviv, as well as streets in Netanya and Rishon Lezion were named after him.
