= May Laws =

Temporary regulations regarding Jews in Russia

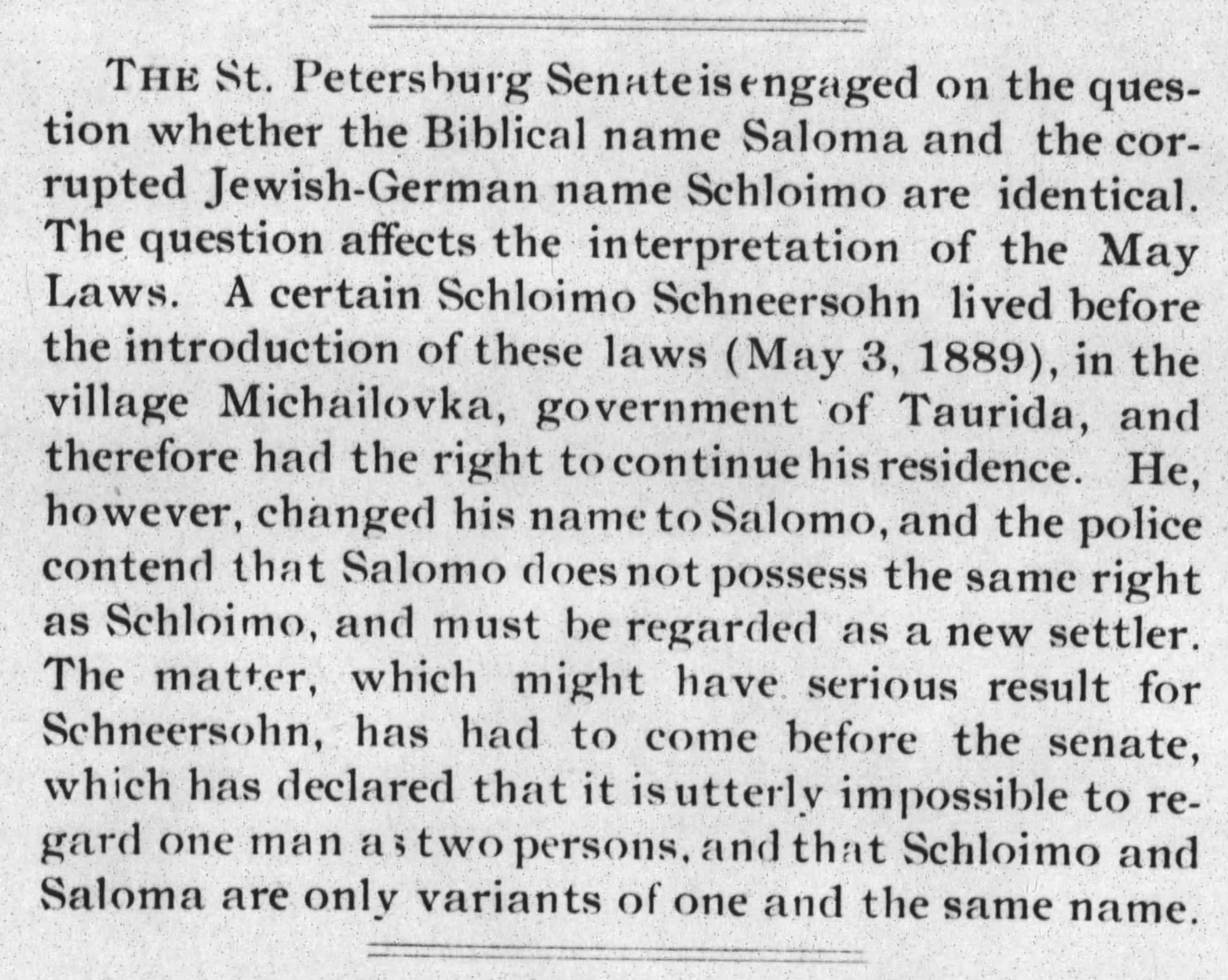
1898 report concerning the May Laws by The Jewish South, Friday 23 Dec 1898, page 3

Temporary regulations regarding the Jews (also known as May Laws) were residency and business restrictions on Jews in the Russian Empire, proposed by minister Nikolay Pavlovich Ignatyev and enacted by Tsar Alexander III on 15 May [O.S. 3 May] 1882. Originally, intended only as temporary measures, they remained in effect for more than thirty years.

== Overview ==
=== Regulations ===
They read as follows:

1. "As a temporary measure, and until a general revision is made of their legal status, it is decreed that the Jews be forbidden to settle anew outside of towns and boroughs, exceptions being admitted only in the case of existing Jewish agricultural colonies."
2. "Temporarily forbidden are the issuing of mortgages and other deeds to Jews, as well as the registration of Jews as lessees of real property situated outside of towns and boroughs; and also the issuing to Jews of powers of attorney to manage and dispose of such real property."
3. "Jews are forbidden to transact business on Sundays and on principal Christian holy days; the existing regulations concerning closing of places of business belonging to Christians on such days should apply to Jews also."
4. "The measures laid down in paragraphs 1, 2, and 3 shall apply only to governments within the Pale of Jewish Settlement."

=== Subsequent legislation ===
In subsequent years, other discriminatory laws were enacted. Quotas were enacted, limiting the number of Jews admitted to high schools and universities and their overall population percentage.

This legislation was repeatedly revised. In 1887, these administrative quotas were tightened down to 10% within the Pale (still double that of Jewish percentage), 5% outside the Pale, except Moscow and St. Petersburg, which were held at 3%. Many towns in the Pale with a significant Jewish population resulted in half-empty schools and many potential students forbidden to enroll. Many Jewish students were unable to complete their education on the soil of their birth.

The proportion of Jewish doctors working in the army was not allowed to exceed 5%. In contrast, any Jewish lawyer who wished to become a barrister needed the express consent of the Minister of Justice.

At the end of the reign, the right of Jews to sell alcohol was revoked.

In the spring of 1891, most Jews were deported from Moscow (except a few deemed "useful") and a newly built synagogue was closed by the city's authorities, headed by governor-general Grand Duke Sergei Alexandrovich, the Tsar's brother. About 20,000 were expelled, causing international condemnations.

In his 9 December 1891 speech to the United States Congress, President Benjamin Harrison said:

"This government had found occasion to express in a friendly spirit but with much earnestness, to the government of the Tsar, its serious concern because of harsh measures being enforced against the Hebrews."

In 1892, new measures banned Jewish participation in local elections despite their large numbers in many towns of the Pale. "The Town Regulations ("Городовое положение") of 1892 prohibited Jews from the right to elect or be elected to town Dumas... That way, reverse proportional representation was achieved: the majority of town's taxpayers had to be subjugated to minority governing the town against Jewish interests."

The next year, the Law Concerning the Names ("Об именах") imposed criminal punishment on those Jews who tried to "adopt Christian names" and dictated that Jews must use their birth names ("какими они означены в метрических книгах") in business, writings, advertisements, nametags, etc.

Those laws remained in effect until 1917 and, together with the steady anti-Jewish riots known as pogroms, provided the impetus for mass emigration from Russia. In the period from 1881 to 1920, over two million Jews left the Russian Empire. Most Russian Jewish emigrants settled in the United States or Argentina, though some immigrated to Palestine, then a province of the Ottoman Empire.

== See also ==
- History of the Jews in Russia
- Bilu (movement)
- Hovevei Zion
- Leon Pinsker
