= Auto-Emancipation =

1882 zionist pamphlet by Leon Pinsker

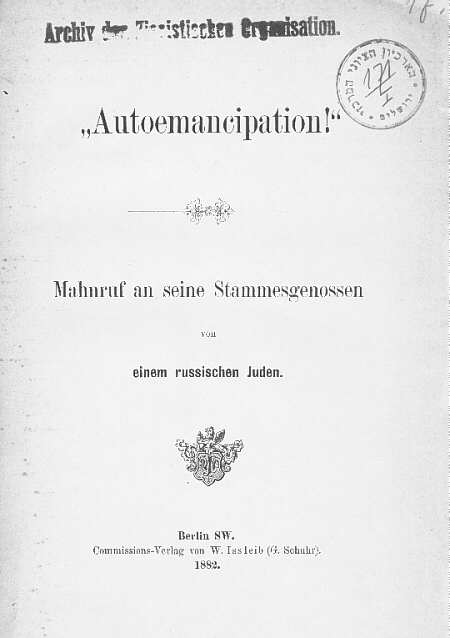
The book "Auto-Emancipation" by Pinsker, 1882

Auto-Emancipation is a pamphlet written in German by Russian-Polish Jewish doctor and activist Leon Pinsker in 1882. It is considered a founding document of modern Jewish nationalism, especially Zionism.

Pinsker discussed the origins of antisemitism and argued for Jewish self-rule and the development of a Jewish national consciousness. He wrote that Jews would never become the social equals of non-Jews until they had a state of their own. He called on Jewish leaders to convene and address the problem. In the pamphlet, he describes anti-Jewish attacks as a psychosis, a pathological disorder and an irrational phobia.

Pinsker had originally been an assimilationist, calling for greater respect of human rights for Jews in Russia. However, following massive anti-Jewish riots in Tsarist Russia in 1881, and a visit to Western Europe in the first half of 1882, his views changed. That year he published the essay anonymously in German. Pinsker's new perspective also led to his involvement in the development of the Jewish nationalist group Hovevei Zion, which he chaired.

The essay itself inspired the group, and Jews throughout Europe, and was a landmark in the development of Zionism and the Jewish State. The pamphlet was published in September 1882.

In 1885, Nathan Birnbaum adopted for his periodical the title Selbst-Emancipation derived from Pinsker's title.

== Quotes ==
"Indeed, what a pitiful figure we cut! We are not counted among the nations, neither have we a voice in their councils, even when the affairs concern us. Our fatherland – the other man's country; our unity – dispersion; our solidarity – the battle against us; our weapon – humility; our defense – flight; our individuality – adaptability; our future – the next day. What a miserable role for a nation which descends from the Maccabees!"

"The great ideas of the eighteenth and nineteenth centuries have not passed by our people without leaving a mark. We feel not only as Jews; we feel as men. As men, we, too, wish to live like other men and be a nation like the others…"

"We must not attach ourselves to the place where our political life was once violently interrupted and destroyed. The goal of our present endeavors must be not the 'Holy Land', but a land of our own. We need nothing but a large piece of land for our poor brothers; a piece of land which shall remain our property, from which no foreign master can expel us. Thither we shall take with us the most sacred possessions which we have saved from the shipwreck of our former father-land, the God-idea and the Bible. It is only these which have made our old father-land the Holy Land, and not Jerusalem or the Jordan. Perhaps the Holy Land will again become ours. If so, all the better, but first of all, we must determine—and this is the crucial point—what country is accessible to us, and at the same time adapted to offer the Jews of all lands who must leave their homes a secure and unquestioned refuge, capable of being made productive."

== See also ==
- Jewish emancipation
- Isaac Rülf
