= Lovers of Zion =

Forerunners and foundation-builders of modern Zionism

The Lovers of Zion, also Hovevei Zion (Hebrew: חובבי ציון) or Hibbat Zion (Hebrew: חיבת ציון, lit. 'Love of Zion'), were a variety of proto-Zionist organizations founded in 1881 in response to the anti-Jewish pogroms in the Russian Empire and were officially constituted as a group at a conference led by Leon Pinsker in 1884.

The organizations are now considered the forerunners and foundation-builders of modern Zionism. Many of the first groups were established in Eastern European countries in the early 1880s with the aim to promote Jewish immigration to Palestine, and advance Jewish settlement there, particularly agricultural. Most of them stayed away from politics.

== History ==
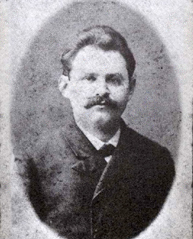
Isaac Leib Goldberg, founder of Rishon Lezion

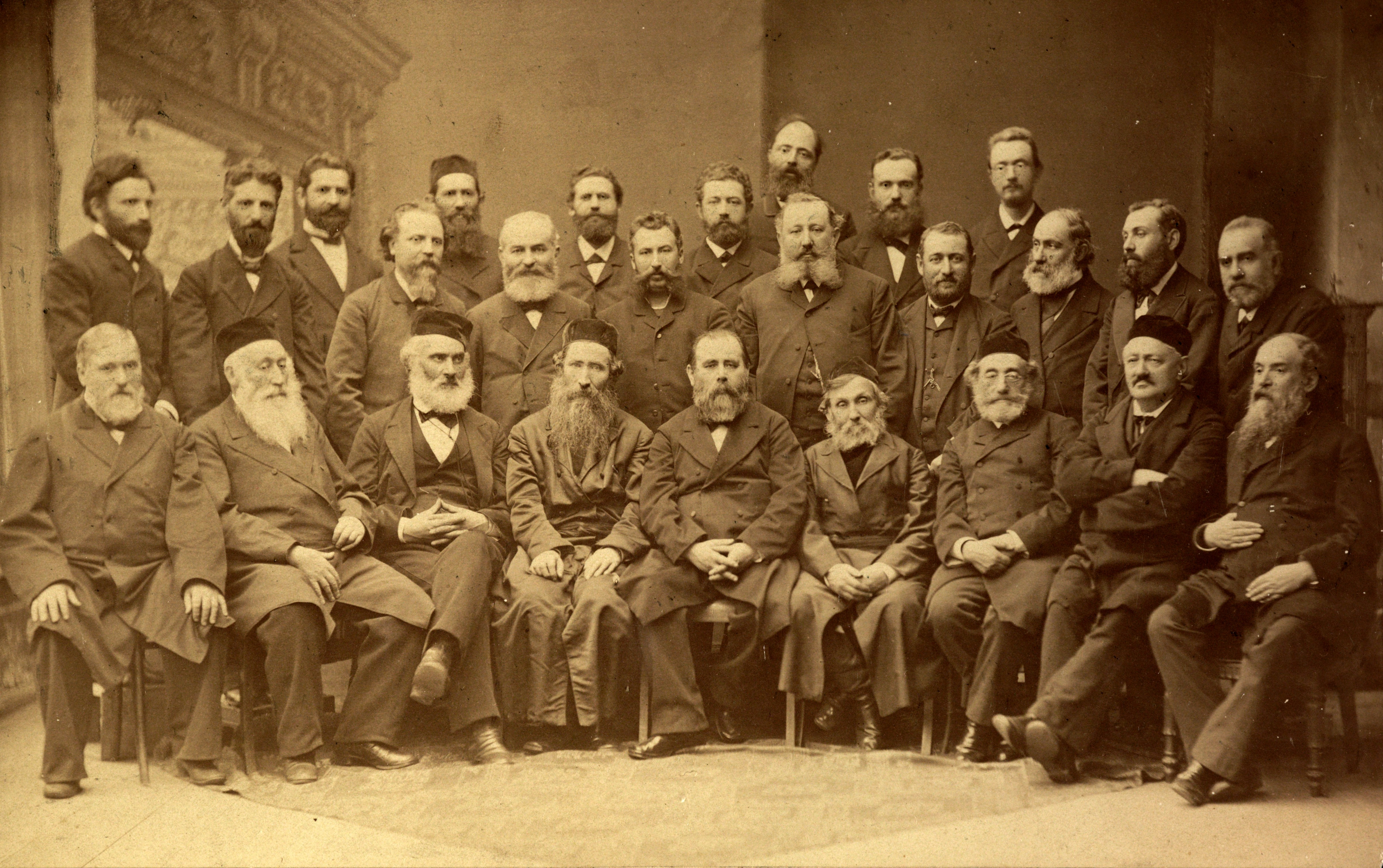
Participants of Katowice Conference, 1884. In the center of the front row are Rabbi Samuel Mohilever and Leon Pinsker.

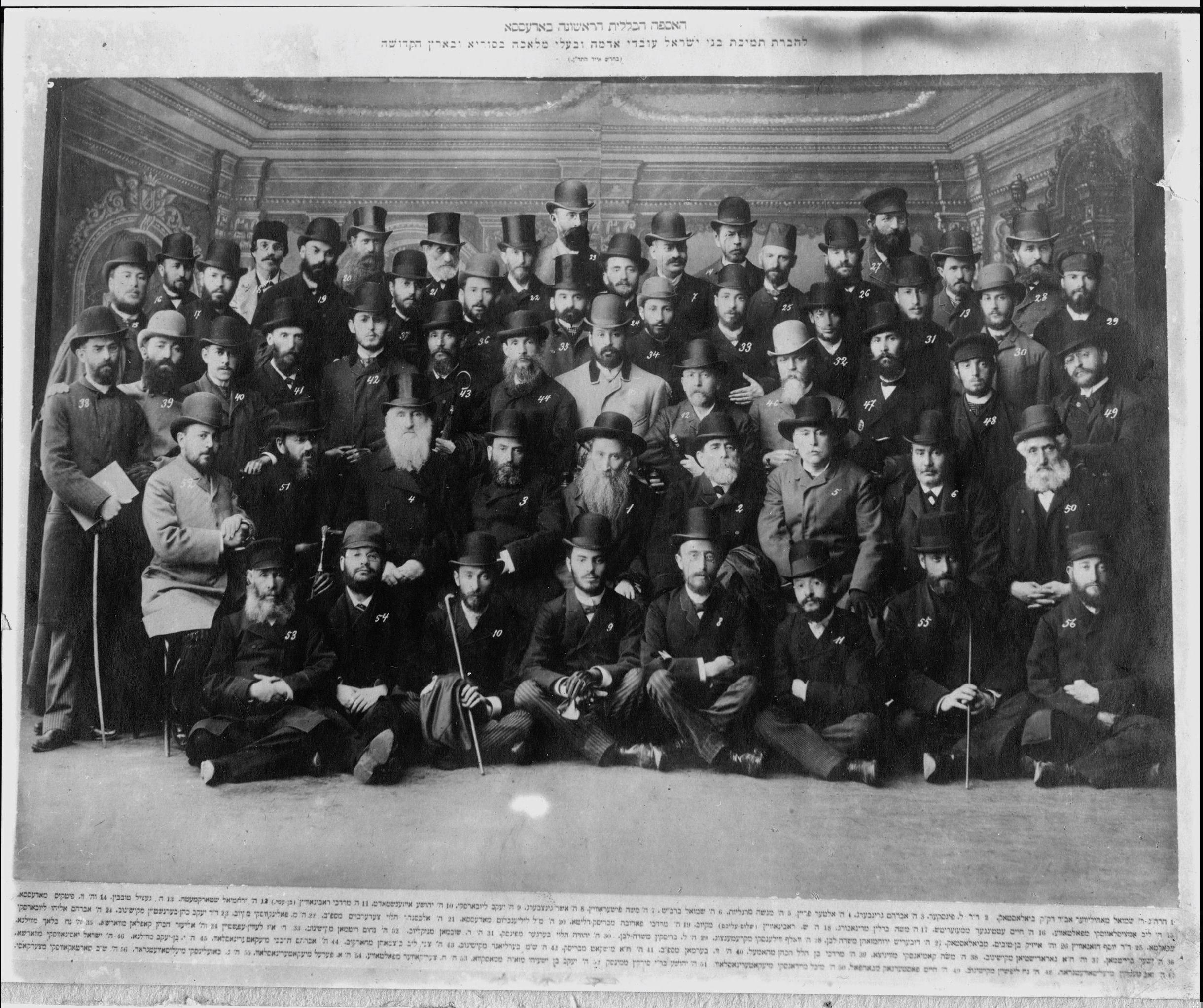
The first general assembly of the Odessa Committee, 1890

19th century Palestine was inhabited by Muslims, Jews, Christians, and Samaritans. As early as 1840 Moses Montefiore advocated for the Jews in the Ottoman Empire, which controlled the areas of Palestine, meeting with British consul Henry John Temple, 3rd Viscount Palmerston to get Muhammad Ali of Egypt and Abdülmecid I, sultan of the Ottoman Empire to protect Palestinian Jews from conflicts with the Ottomans.

In 1850, according to the Ottoman census provincial yearbook, Palestine had 63,659 recorded households. Roughly 85% were Muslim, 11% were Christian and 4% Jewish. The Jewish population was recorded at about 14,730, and increased to 24,000 by 1882.

In 1854, Judah Touro bequeathed money to fund Jewish residential settlement in Palestine. Moses Montefiore was appointed executor of his will. He used the funds for various projects, including building the first Jewish residential settlement and almshouse outside of the old walled city of Jerusalem in 1860, which is known today as Mishkenot Sha'ananim. Laurence Oliphant failed in a like attempt to bring to Palestine the Jewish proletariat of Poland, Lithuania, Romania, and the Turkish Empire (1879 and 1882).

In the Russian Empire, waves of pogroms of 1881–1884 (some allegedly state-sponsored), as well as the antisemitic May Laws of 1882 introduced by Tsar Alexander III of Russia, deeply affected Jewish communities. More than 2 million Jews fled Russia between 1880 and 1920. The vast majority of them emigrated to the United States, but some decided to form an aliyah to Ottoman-ruled Palestine.

In 1882, a group of ten Lovers of Zion enthusiasts from Kharkiv, headed by Zalman David Levontin and including noted philanthropists Isaac Leib Goldberg and Reuven Yudalevich, founded Rishon LeZion, the first Zionist settlement founded in the New Yishuv. This was done despite obstacles posed by the Turkish government, which hindered the purchase of land. Later, Bilu pioneers strengthened the settlement and enlarged it. For many years, textbooks gave Bilu the credit for the establishment of Rishon LeZion, but in the last decades—after a campaign by the veterans of Rishon and their descendants—'Lovers of Zion were given the credit as the founders of the city.

The Hovevei Zion tract Aruchas bas-ami was authored by Isaac Rülf in 1883, and in 1884, 34 delegates met in Kattowitz, Germany (today Katowice, Poland). Rabbi Samuel Mohilever was elected the president and Leon Pinsker the chairman of the organization they named Hovevei Zion. Pinsker was aided by Shaul Pinchas Rabbinowicz. The group tried to secure financial help from Baron Edmond James de Rothschild and other philanthropists to aid Jewish settlements in Palestine and to organize educational courses. In June 1887, another conference was held in Druskininkai.

The Warsaw chapter was founded by L. L. Zamenhof, who was working on the first grammar textbook of Yiddish ever written, published under the pseudonym "Dr. X" only in 1909, in Lebn un visnshaft, in the article "Vegn a yidisher gramatik un reform in der yidisher shprakh".

To attain legal recognition by the authorities, the Russian branch of Hovevei Zion had to meet a demand to be registered as a charity. Early in 1890, its establishment was approved by the Imperial Russian government as "The Society for the Support of Jewish Farmers and Artisans in Syria and Eretz Israel," which came to be known as the Odessa Committee. It was dedicated to the practical aspects of establishing agricultural settlements, and its projects in 1890–1891 included help in the founding of Rehovot and Hadera and rehabilitation of Mishmar HaYarden.

One of the major donors was the famous tea merchant Kalonimus Wolf Wissotzky, who founded the largest tea company in Russia, Wissotzky Tea. Wissotzky financed agricultural colonies in Palestine and visited the country in 1884–1885. He later published a book about his visit.

In 1897, before the First Zionist Congress, the Odessa Committee counted over 4,000 members. Once the Congress established the Zionist Organization, most of the Hovevei Zion societies joined.

== Founders and leaders ==
- Samuel Mohilever
- Moshe Leib Lilienblum
- Leon Pinsker

== See also ==
- Homeland for the Jewish people
- Mikveh Israel
- Moses Gaster
