= Yehiel Tschlenow =

Physician and Zionist leader

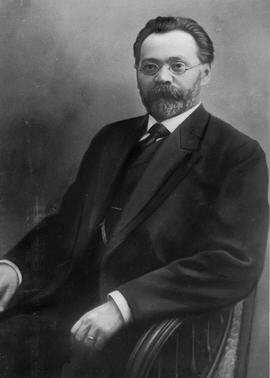
- Dr. Tschlenow, late 1916
- Born: Yehiel Yefim Vladimirovich Tschlenow; September 28, 1863; Kremenchuk, Poltava Governorate, Russian Empire
- Died: January 31, 1918 (aged 54); London, United Kingdom
- Resting place: Trumpeldor Cemetery
- Occupations: Physician, Zionist leader
- Spouse: Rebecca Ratner
- Children: Ze'ev, Binyamin, Fanny

Yehiel Yefim Vladimirovich Tschlenow (Note: (also written Chlenov; Yiddish: טשלענאָוו; Russian: Иехиэль (Ефим Владимирович) Членов)) (September 28, 1863, Russian Empire – January 31, 1918, United Kingdom) was a physician and a Zionist leader, who served for many years as the chairman of the congresses of the Zionists of Russia.

== Biography ==
=== Early life and education ===
Yehiel Tschlenow was born into a Hasidic family in the city of Kremenchuk in the Poltava Governorate, then in the Pale of Settlement of the Russian Empire. In 1876, as a boy, he moved with his family to Moscow, where he completed his high school education. After graduating from high school, he began studying medicine at Moscow University, graduating in 1888. During his studies, he became close to revolutionary movements in Russia and began to take an interest in the ideology of the Narodniks. After graduation, he began a medical career in Moscow.

=== Initial Zionist activity ===
Following the pogroms of 1881, he left the Russian revolutionary circles and grew closer to the Hovevei Zion. Together with Menachem Ussishkin, he founded the first Zionist group in Moscow, and later in 1884, together with Rabbi Yaakov Mazeh and Pesach Marek, he founded the "Bnei Zion" (Sons of Zion) group. In 1897, he participated in the First Zionist Congress in Basel, and joined the Zionist movement.

=== Leader of Russian Zionists ===
In 1902 he was the chairman of the Minsk Conference. At the Sixth Zionist Congress in 1903 he led the faction of Russian Zionists who opposed the Uganda Scheme, and along with 128 congress members, walked out of the plenum in protest against the acceptance of the plan. Against the plan, Tschlenow wrote several articles under the general title: "Zion and Africa". Yehiel served as chairman of the 3rd Congress of Russian Zionists in Helsinki from 1905 to 1907. The main plan discussed there was the mobilization of resources for purchasing land in Palestine.

He married Rebecca, daughter of Shalom Ratner. Her home was a meeting place and workspace for the center of Russian Zionism. After hesitations and delays, he yielded to the entreaties of Zionist leaders and moved, after the Eleventh Zionist Congress held in Vienna, to Berlin, where he had to travel without his family, who remained in Moscow. He stayed in Berlin until the outbreak of World War I, when he returned to his home in Moscow.

=== In senior Zionist roles ===
At the General Zionist Congresses, Tschlenow was elected as a member of the Jewish Colonial Trust and as a member of the Jewish National Fund. By virtue of his new role, he visited Palestine between 1907 and 1909 and purchased land near the Sea of Galilee, where the agricultural settlement of Migdal was established. In the following years, he invested his efforts in writing about issues of education and the future development of Zionism, and also continued writing articles against the Uganda Scheme. In 1911, he moved to Berlin, which became the permanent center of the Zionist movement until 1921, and headed the "Geulat Ha'aretz" (Land Redemption) company established by Otto Warburg. In 1911 he was elected to the Zionist Executive of the World Zionist Congress, which was the body with the greatest authority in the Congress. That same year, the "She'erit Yisrael" society from Moscow, of which he was one of the heads, purchased land and established the Ruhama. As part of his role, he participated in the inauguration of the Technion in Haifa in 1912.

During World War I, after returning to Moscow, he traveled to a Zionist Executive gathering in Copenhagen, and from there to London, where he participated in the political activities of Dr. Chaim Weizmann and Nahum Sokolow.

=== Policy line in his last years ===
Tschlenow advocated for the Zionist movement to remain neutral in the war and not intervene in favor of either side. He strongly opposed the establishment of the Committee for Eastern Affairs by German Zionists, as he believed this could lead to antisemitism in Russia. He opposed Ze'ev Jabotinsky's initiative to establish the Jewish Legion with British support, as well as the initiative of Chaim Weizmann and Nahum Sokolow to mobilize Jewish support for the British Empire. Tschlenow received the Balfour Declaration in 1917 coolly and opposed celebratory parades following it.

=== Russian Zionist Congress in 1917 ===
After the February Revolution, all political parties in Russia became legal, and between May 24 and 31, the General Congress of all Russian Zionists took place, where parties with all possible platforms were represented. The parties reached an agreement on policy lines in the new situation.

During one of his missions for the Zionist movement in London in 1918, Yehiel Tschlenow died of pneumonia following complications of the Spanish flu, at the age of 54. He left behind his wife Rebecca, who immigrated to Palestine in 1922 with her two sons (Ze'ev and Binyamin) and her daughter Dr. Fanny Tschlenow-Krieger, who married Dr. Moshe Krieger. Rebecca died in Tel Aviv on April 21, 1957.

== Commemoration ==
His remains were brought to Israel in early 1961, and he was buried in the Trumpeldor Cemetery.

The moshav Talmei Yehiel was named after him. In many cities in Israel streets were named after him, including in Jerusalem, Tel Aviv, Haifa, Petah Tikva, Holon, and Rishon LeZion.

== Selected writings ==
- Yehiel Tschlenow: Chapters of his life and activity, memoirs, writings, speeches, letters, Tel Aviv: Eretz Israel Publishing Press, 5697-1937
- Palästina oder ein anderes Land? rede von E.W. Tschlenow auf dem VII. Zionisten-Kongress in Basel, 1905 (herausgegeben von der Zionistischen Propaganda-Kommission), Berlin: Verlag der ’Jüdischen Rundschau’, 1906. (in German)
- Эволюция политического сионизма и задачи текущего момента, Санкт-Петербу́рг, 1907. (in Russian)
- Fünf Jahre der Arbeit in Palästina [Five Years of Work in Palestine] / von E.W. Tschlenoff, Berlin: Jüdischer Verlag, 1913. (in German)
- Der Krieg, die russische Revolution und der Zionismus: Rede / von E.W.Tschlenow auf der Delegierten-Konferenz der russischen Zionisten in Petrograd, 1917 (hrsg. vom Kopenhagener Bureau der Zionistischen Organisation), Copenhagen: typ.M.Truelsen, 1917. (in German)
  - La guerre, la révolution russe et le Sionisme: discours prononcé à la Conférence des sionistes russes, à Petrograd, le 24.mai-6. juin 1917, Copenhague: Bureau d’organisation sioniste, 1917. (in French)
