= Zionism =

Jewish nationalist movement

Zionism (Note: /ˈzaɪ.ənɪzəm/ ZY-ə-niz-əm; Hebrew: צִיּוֹנוּת, romanized: Ṣīyyonūt, IPA: [tsijoˈnut]) is an ethnic nationalist movement that emerged in late 19th-century Europe to establish and support a Jewish homeland through colonization in the region of Palestine, which roughly corresponds to the Land of Israel in Judaism—itself central to Jewish history. Zionists wanted to create a Jewish state in Palestine with as much land, as many Jews, and as few Palestinian Arabs as possible. Zionism was the main force behind the creation of the State of Israel in 1948, and remains the country's dominant ideology today.

Modern Zionism initially emerged in Central and Eastern Europe as a secular nationalist movement in the late 19th century, in reaction to new waves of antisemitism and in response to the Haskalah, or Jewish Enlightenment. By the beginning of the 20th century, the Zionist movement, led by Theodor Herzl, associated this national revival with lands in Palestine, a region then under Ottoman rule. The arrival of Zionist settlers in Palestine during this period is widely seen as marking the start of the Israeli–Palestinian conflict. Zionists justified their claim to Palestine by invoking a perceived historical right to it and widely asserted that this right outweighed that of the Palestinian Arab population. (Note: Ber Borochov: "...On the other hand, the Palestinians [Zionists of Zion (Note: This refers to the Zionists opposing the Uganda scheme)] accuse them [ Territorialists ] of philanthropic-sentimental mannerisms and anti-national tendencies, because they [the Zionists of Zion] consider the Land of Israel to be an inseparable part of the Jewish national ideal; for proof, the Palestinians (Zionists of Zion) typically bring up the past of the People of Israel, various expressions of the people's longing for the Land of Israel in literature, in the people's experiences, and in messianic movements, and they also rely on the history of the Zionist movement itself."; Menachem Ussishkin: "The only, serious and real hope, a hope that is based on full historical rights - remains only in the Land of Israel."; David Ben-Gurion: "Our right to aliyah is not only the right of those individuals who immigrate to the land, but the right of the entire Jewish people... Our right to aliyah is not only the fruit of the legal act which was confirmed at a known moment by international law - it precedes this act, and it stems from the historical connection of the Jewish people with this land."; Max Nordau: "If it became apparent that it was impossible to come to an agreement with His Majesty the Sultan, if his unbending will shut us out of Palestine, then, still solemnly asserting our undying historical claims to the land of our fathers, firmly and resolutely adhering to the Basle programme, we should have to be patient and wait."; Itzhak Ben-Zvi: "In your entire speech, which was aimed solely at the Arab residents of our country, there was no explicit mention of the historical national right of the Jewish people to their land, which is the basis and foundation of all our aspirations and all our claims to the Land of Israel; it is what makes the Hebrew people a political entity in the world and an official partner in the building of this country."; Chaim Weizmann: "The Mandate has not yet been published, but I am able to give you its main clauses: 1. The Mandate recognises the justice of the Jews' historical claim to Palestine, and this is the foundation of our structure"; "I have already spoken many times about our relations with the Arabs: our plans are not directed against the Arabs, but the opposite. We want the new development of the country to be of great benefit to them. But we come back and say on behalf of millions of Jews, that we have a historical right to Israel and permission to continue the life that was interrupted by cruel acts. And we will return this life to Israel not with weapons but with vigor, diligence and honest work - this will be understood by all nations."; Moshe Leib Lilienblum: "Therefore, we must strive for the settlement of the Land of Israel by workers of the soil from the children of Israel and settle our brothers on it in such a way that for a hundred years our brothers will be able to leave almost completely the Europe that is revolting against them, and settle in the land of our ancestors adjacent to it, to which we have a historical right, which did not end and was not lost with the loss of our rule, just as the right of the Balkan peoples to their land did not end with the loss of our rule."; Moses Gaster: "We desire to emphasize once more our moral and historical claim to that country, and to show by careful and unbiased investigation that whatever may have been advanced against our aims, from whatever quarter and with whatever arguments, be they historical, geographical, political, or economical, has no foundation in fact."; Nahum Sokolow: "Never has a nation governed its own home for a longer period; no nation's history, religion, literature, and traditions are more closely bound up with its land; and no nation has ever suffered a more terrible martyrdom after having been disinherited. Can anyone doubt the right of the Jewish people to the land of Israel? The validity of the Jewish title to Palestine rests on the same basis as the title of any nation to any particular area of the world where it has ruled and existed for centuries. The Jews' historical right on the Land of Israel, with due consideration for the rights and interests of the non-Jewish population which will be safe-guarded and respected, must become the decisive factor in the question of Palestine."; Jehiel Tschlenow: "...The historical rights of the Jewish people to their historical homeland; the organic connection existing between them and their land.)

In the 1917 Balfour Declaration, Britain declared its support for "the establishment in Palestine of a national home for the Jewish people". The 1922 Mandate for Palestine placed Britain in control of Palestine until 1948, when the State of Israel declared its independence and war broke out. During the war, Israel expanded its territory to control over 78% of former Mandatory Palestine. After the 1948 Palestinian expulsion and flight, an estimated 160,000 of 870,000 Palestinians in the territory remained, forming a Palestinian minority in Israel.

Zionist views have varied over time and are not uniform, resulting in a variety of types of Zionism. The Zionist mainstream has historically included Liberal, Labor, Revisionist, and Cultural Zionism, while groups like Brit Shalom and Ihud have been dissident factions within the movement. Religious Zionism is a variant that combines secular nationalism and religious conservatism. Advocates of Zionism have viewed it as a national liberation movement for the repatriation of an indigenous people (who were subject to persecution and share a national identity through national consciousness), to the homeland of their ancestors. Opponents of Zionism often characterize it as a supremacist, colonialist, or racist ideology, or as a settler colonialist movement.

== Etymology and terminology ==
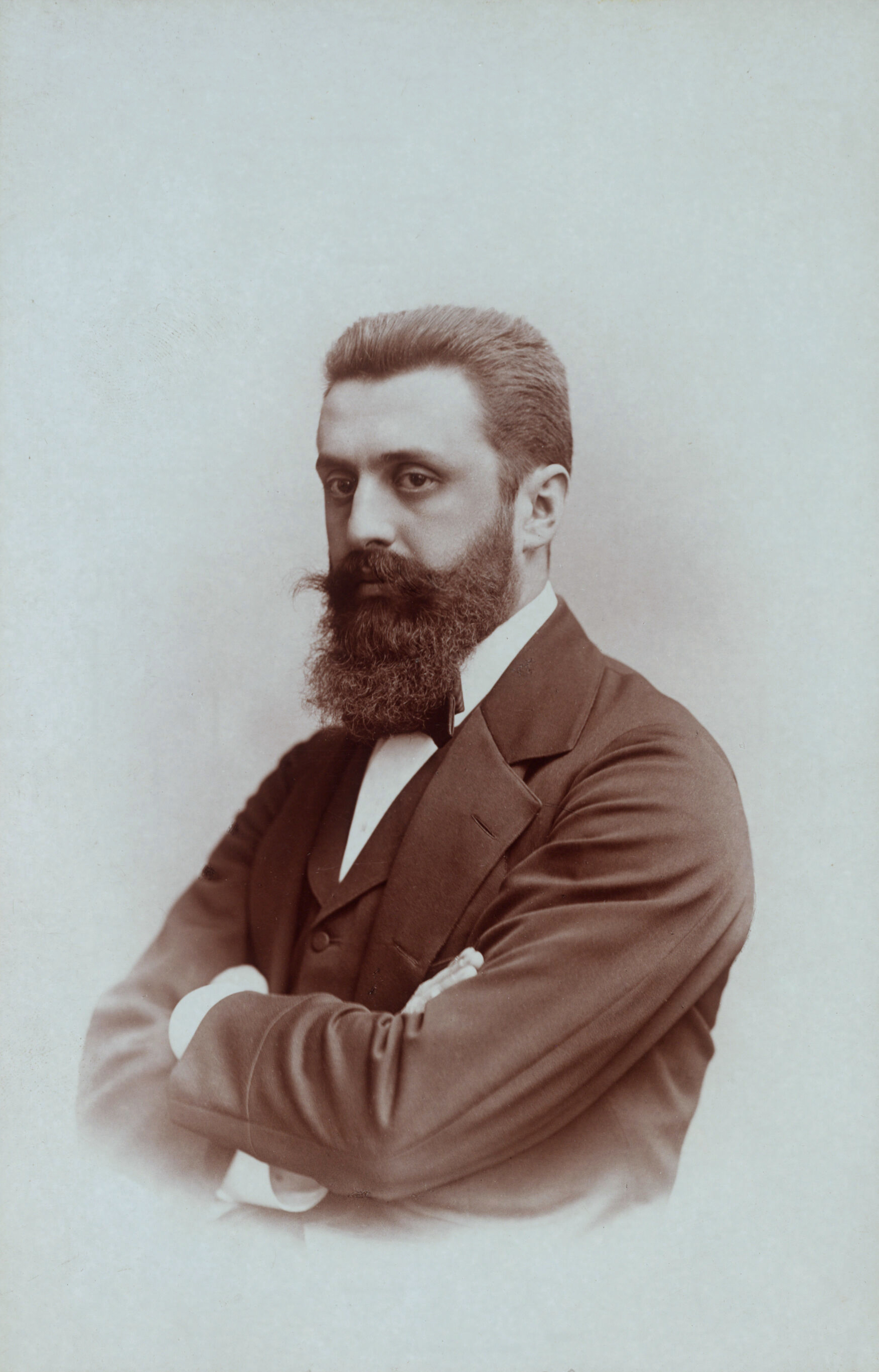
Theodor Herzl was the founder of the modern Zionist movement. In his 1896 pamphlet Der Judenstaat, he envisioned the founding of a future independent Jewish state during the 20th century.

The word Zion itself derives from Mount Zion, a hill in Jerusalem and a term used in the Hebrew Bible. It has been used poetically as a synecdoche for the Land of Israel since the period of the Babylonian Exile, with particular importance in Jewish messianic belief. The term also appeared in political contexts in antiquity, including on coinage issued during the First Jewish Revolt against Roman rule. The messianic conception of "Zion" was used by the Rabbi Zvi Hirsch Kalischer, who wrote Seeking Zion in 1862, a proto-Zionist text that was the first written work to demand that the Jews migrate en masse to Palestine.

The term "Zion" was first associated with a mass movement of Jews in connection with the activities of Hovevei Zion (lit. "Lovers of Zion"), also known as the Hibbat Zion (lit. 'Love of Zion'), who came together at the 1884 Katowice Conference, inspired by Leon Pinsker's pamphlet Auto-Emancipation.

The first use of the term as an -ism is attributed to the Austrian writer Nathan Birnbaum, in an 1890 article published in his periodical Selbst-Emancipation (itself named after Pinsker's pamphlet). Birnbaum used "Zionism" to refer to the various activities of the Lovers of Zion. In 1893, he published a pamphlet titled The National Rebirth of The Jewish People in Their Own Land, which advocated for European Jews to migrate to Palestine. In the same year, he founded Zion: Union of Austrian Societies for the Colonization of Palestine and Syria, to advance his proposals.

The paramount Zionist leader Theodor Herzl was unaware of Birnbaum's original usage of the term before popularizing the term "Zionism" himself. In Herzl's diary entries between 1895 and early 1896, he used the term "Zionist" to describe others such as the Lovers of Zion, whom Herzl saw as fellow Jewish nationalists, but without a concrete plan. When Herzl published his seminal pamphlet Der Judenstaat in 1896, he used the term "Zionist" in the text, often in a critical light, to describe emigration advocates like the Lovers of Zion. In his manifesto, Herzl called for the creation of a Jewish state, an idea he claimed was "an ancient one" that he did not "discover". Birnbaum wrote a review of the pamphlet, attributing its success to its author's proud embrace of Zionism, but also criticizing Herzl's cultural proposals. Birnbaum quickly struck up a correspondence with Herzl, and gave him a copy of The National Rebirth of The Jewish People in Their Own Land, as a sort of Zionist education.

Herzl did not begin identifying as a "Zionist" until months after the publication of Der Judenstaat. His usage of "Zionism" was later popularized when convening the 1897 First Zionist Congress and the Zionist Organization founded there.

== Beliefs ==
=== National self-determination ===
Fundamental to Zionism is the belief that Jews constitute a nation, and have a moral and historic right and need for self-determination. In contrast to the Zionist notion of nationhood the Judaic sense of being a nation was rooted in religious beliefs of unique chosenness and divine providence, rather than in ethnicity. Specifically, prayers emphasized distinctiveness from other nations where a connection to Eretz Israel and the anticipation of restoration were based on messianic beliefs and religious practices, not modern nationalist conceptions.

=== A Jewish home and state in Palestine ===
Early Zionism was ambiguous about the form self-determination might take. While some texts spoke of a "Jewish state", others spoke only of a "Jewish homeland" (in the Basel declaration) or "national home for the Jewish people" (the term used in the Balfour Declaration), usually under the sovereignty of the Ottoman and, later, the British Empire. According to Shlomo Avineri, it was only in the 1930s that a sovereign state rather than home became the fully articulated goal.

Similarly, some early Zionists, including Herzl, considered possibilities for a Jewish national home or state outside Palestine, for example in the Americas or Africa. In 1905 (after Herzl's death), a majority of the Zionist Congress voted against the proposal to settle in East Africa, and the supporters of this proposal, led by Israel Zangwill, split from the movement to form the Jewish Territorial Organization.

Leading up to the 17th Zionist congress, Chaim Weizmann said that he opposed seeking a Jewish state. In response, Revisionist Zionists demanded that the Zionist movement announce its intentions to seek a Jewish state. Labor Zionists found it difficult to make up their minds about it. Many Zionists believed that such a declaration would damage the movement and preferred remaining ambiguous.

Over time, the belief that Jews have a moral and historic right and need for self-determination in Palestine became the dominant Zionist view. (Note: "The basic assumption regarding the right of Jews to Palestine—a right that required no proof—was a fundamental component of all Zionist programs. In contrast with other prospective areas for Jewish settlement, such as Argentina or East Africa, it was generally believed that no one could deny the right of the Jews to their ancestral land. Even Ahad Ha-Am, the eternal skeptic, commented that this was 'a land to which our historical right is beyond doubt and has no need for farfetched proofs.' Others, such as Lilienblum, did not even think it necessary to dwell on this matter.") Zionists justified their claim to Palestine by invoking a perceived historical right to it and widely asserting that this right outweighed that of the Palestinian Arab population. After suffering as a minority in Europe and the Middle East, establishing a Jewish-majority state became a focus. Zionist organizations encouraged immigration to Palestine, and antisemitism was a strong push factor.

=== Establishing a Jewish demographic majority ===
Mainstream Zionism has always held that Jews should constitute a majority in Palestine; though some prominent Zionists disagreed. (Note: The only parties disagreed were Brit Shalom and Ihud. Around the 17th Zionist congress, Chaim Weizmann was criticized for not insisting on a Jewish majority.) Israeli historian Yosef Gorny argues that this demographic change required annulling the majority status of the Arabs. Gorny argues that the Zionist movement regarded Arab motives in Palestine as lacking both moral and historical significance. According to Israeli historian Simha Flapan, the view expressed in Golda Meir's 1969 interview comment that "there was no such thing as Palestinians" is a cornerstone of Zionist policy. After the Holocaust, even those on the far-left of the Zionist movement, including Martin Buber and other members of Brit Shalom, did not see the Arabs as having an equally weighty claim to nationhood in Palestine, and sought demographic parity. (Note: "When faced with the apocalyptic dimensions of the Jewish catastrophe, the Holocaust, even Brit-Shalom Ihud moved to endorse first the necessity of demographic parity between Jews and Arabs in Palestine, and then, as 'a necessary evil', the idea of a Jewish independent state, that is the partition of Palestine. It was no longer the time for moral scruples or guilt feelings towards the dispossessed Arab population.'") Judah Magnes, even after the Holocaust, continued to support a binational state, even one imposed by the Great Powers, but was unable to find Arabs in favour of binationalism to work with. British officials supporting the Zionist effort also held similar beliefs. (Note: Lord Balfour would write, "Zionism, be it right or wrong, good or bad, is rooted in age-long traditions, in present needs, in future hopes, of far greater import than the desires and prejudices of the 700,000 Arabs who now inhabit that ancient land.") (Note: While Secretary of State for the Colonies, Winston Churchill spoke to the Peel Commission: "I do not admit that the dog in the manger has the final right to the manger, even though he may have lain there for a very long time. I do not admit that right. I do not admit, for instance, that a great wrong has been done to the Red Indians of America, or the black people of Australia. I do not admit that a wrong has been done to those people by the fact that a stronger race, a higher grade race, or, at any rate, a more worldly-wise race, to put it that way, has come in and taken their place.")

Unlike other forms of nationalism, the Zionist claim to Palestine was aspirational and required a mechanism by which the claim could be realized. The territorial concentration of Jews in Palestine and the subsequent goal of establishing a Jewish majority there was the main mechanism by which Zionist groups sought to realize this claim. By the time of the 1936 Arab Revolt, the political differences between the various Zionist groups had shrunk further, with almost all Zionist groups seeking a Jewish state in Palestine. While not every Zionist group openly called for the establishment of a Jewish state in Palestine, every group in the Zionist mainstream sought a Jewish demographic majority there.

In pursuing a Jewish demographic majority, the Zionist movement encountered the demographic problem posed by the presence of the local Arab population, which was predominantly non-Jewish. The practical issue of establishing a Jewish state in a majority non-Jewish region was an issue of fundamental importance for the Zionist movement. Many Zionist activists intended to establish a Jewish majority through Jewish immigration to the region.

Zionists used the term "transfer" as a euphemism for the removal, or what would now be called ethnic cleansing, of the Palestinian population. According to Benny Morris, the idea of transfer played a large role in Zionist ideology from the inception of the movement and was seen as the main method of maintaining the "Jewishness" of the Zionist's state. He argues that "transfer" was "inevitable and inbuilt into Zionism" and that a land that was primarily Arab could not be transformed into a Jewish state without displacing the Arab population. Further, the stability of the Jewish state could not be ensured given the Arab population's fear of displacement. He argues that this would be the primary source of conflict between the Zionist movement and the Arab population.

The concept of "transfer" had a long pedigree in Zionist thought, as it was considered both moral and practical, as a way to deal with the Palestinian problem, create a Jewish homeland and avoid ethnic conflict. The concept of removing the non-Jewish population from Palestine garnered support across the entire spectrum of Zionist groups, eventually including its farthest left factions, who, after realizing the extent of the destruction of European Jewry, viewed it as a lesser evil. (Note: On this topic, Ben-Ami writes: "This is how a Brit-Shalom Ihud, non-Zionist member of the Jewish Agency, Werner Senator, put it: 'If I weigh the catastrophe of five million Jews against the transfer of one million Arabs, then with a clean and easy conscience I can state that even more drastic acts are permissible.'") Transfer thought began early in the movement's development in various forms. "Transfer" was seen not only as desirable but also as an ideal solution by some in the Zionist leadership, but it remained controversial. During the 1948 Palestine war and the 1948 Palestinian expulsion and flight, a Transfer Committee was established by the Israeli Cabinet.

=== Perceived deficiencies of assimilation, negation of diasporic life ===
From the perspective of some early Zionist thinkers, Jews living amongst non-Jews suffer from impediments that can be addressed only by rejecting the Jewish identity that developed while living amongst non-Jews. Accordingly, the early Zionists sought to develop a nationalist Jewish political life in a territory where Jews constitute a demographic majority. The early Zionist thinkers saw the integration of Jews into non-Jewish society as both unrealistic (or insufficient to address the deficiencies associated with demographic minority status) and undesirable, since assimilation was accompanied by the dilution of Jewish cultural distinctiveness. The Zionist solution to the perceived deficiencies of diasporic life (or the "Jewish Question") was dependent on the territorial concentration of Jews in Palestine, with the longer-term goal of establishing a Jewish demographic majority there.

Negation of the Diaspora is a concept that asserts that Jews living in the Diaspora—that is, outside of the Land of Israel—are in an environment that is inherently harmful and so must be fixed to ensure the survival and the cohesion of the Jews as a people, often to the extent that the Jewish people have no future without amassing at their "spiritual centre" in the Land of Israel.

==== Zionism and secular Jewish identity ====
Zionism sought to reconfigure Jewish identity and culture in nationalist and secular terms. According to Yaacov Yadgar, Zionism rejected traditional Judaic definitions of what it means to be Jewish, but struggled to offer a new interpretation of Jewish identity independent of rabbinical tradition. Yagdar argues that Jewish religion is viewed as an essentially negative factor in Zionism, even in religious Zionist ideology, and as responsible for the diminishing status of Jews living as a minority. Responding to the challenges of modernity, Zionism sought to replace religious and community institutions with secular-nationalistic ones. Indeed, Zionism maintained primarily the outward symbols of Jewish tradition, redefining them in a nationalistic context. Zionism saw itself as bringing Jews into the modern world by redefining what it means to be Jewish in terms of identification with a sovereign state, rather than Judaic faith and tradition.

This new identity would be based on a rejection of the life of exile. Zionism portrayed the Diaspora Jew as mentally unstable, physically frail, and prone to engaging in transient businesses. They were seen as detached from nature, purely materialistic, and focused solely on their personal gains. In contrast, the vision for the new Jew was radically different: an individual of strong moral and aesthetic values, not shackled by religion, driven by ideals and willing to challenge degrading circumstances; a liberated, dignified person eager to defend both personal and national pride. This was the "New Jew" posited by Nordau's Muscular Judaism and later the pioneering "Sabra" celebrated in Israeli nationalism - not the feminine, over-intellectual, degenerate Luftmenschen (people of air) of the diaspora, as Nordau characterised them.

According to Yadgar, the Zionist goal of reframing of Jewish identity in secular-nationalist terms meant primarily the decline of the status of religion in the Jewish community. Prominent Zionist thinkers frame the development of secular identity as nationalism functionally serving the same role as religion. Zionism sought to make Jewish ethnic-nationalism the distinctive trait of Jews rather than their commitment to Judaism. According to Yadgar, Zionism instead adopted a racial understanding of Jewish identity. According to Yadgar, framed this way (for instance by A. B. Yehoshua), Jewish identity is only secondarily a matter of tradition or culture. Nur Masalha says Zionist thinkers view the movement as a "revolt against a tradition of many centuries" of living parasitically at the margins of Western society. Indeed, he says, Zionism was uncomfortable with the term "Jewish," associating it with passivity, spirituality and the stain of "galut." Instead, Zionist thinkers preferred the term "Hebrew" to describe their identity. Zionism linked the term "Jewish" with negative characteristics prevalent in European antisemitic stereotypes, which Zionists believed could be remedied only through sovereignty.

=== Revival of the Hebrew language ===
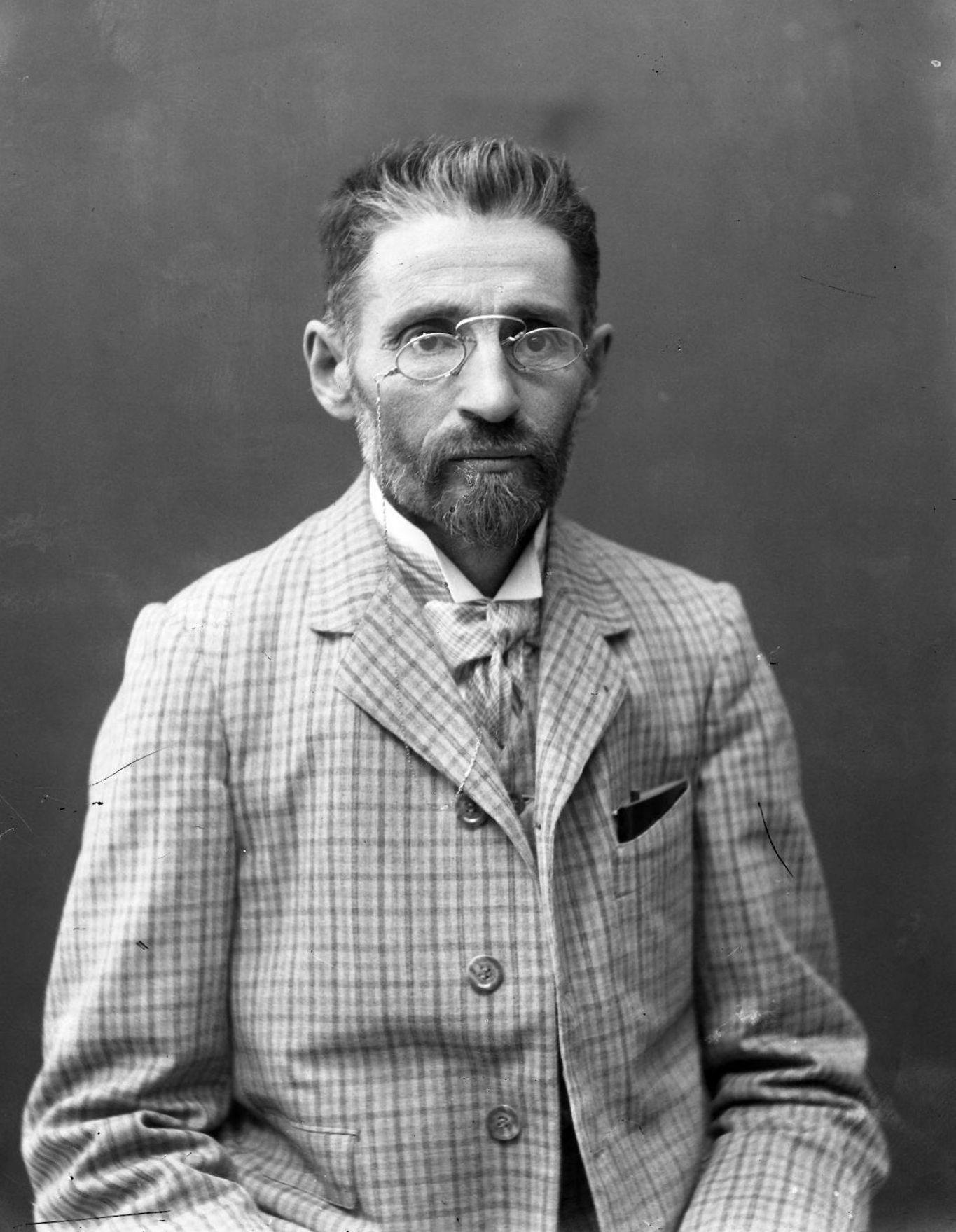
Eliezer Ben-Yehuda (1858–1922), founder and leader of the movement to revive the Hebrew language, is considered the father of Modern Hebrew.

The revival of the Hebrew language in Eastern Europe as a secular literary medium marked a significant cultural shift among Jews, who traditionally used Hebrew for religious purposes. The effort to revive the Hebrew language as a spoken vernacular pre-dated Zionism. The establishment of Modern Hebrew is most closely associated with the linguist Eliezer Ben-Yehuda and the Committee of the Hebrew Language (later replaced by the Academy of the Hebrew Language). It was an influential cause in early Jewish agricultural settlements, that was adopted enthusiastically by participants of the Second Aliyah. Having avoided the question previously, the World Zionist Organization came down decisively in favour of the use of Hebrew in 1913, following massive popular agitation in the Yishuv (the pre-1948 Jewish community in Palestine).

According to Alain Dieckhoff, the primary motivation for adopting Hebrew as a national language was the desire to establish apparent continuity between ancient and modern Jews to help solidify the legitimacy of Zionism. Zionist leaders such as Ben Gurion also saw the Hebrew language as an essential component of strengthening cultural unity among the Jewish people. These developments are seen in Zionist historiography as a revolt against tradition, with the development of Modern Hebrew providing the basis on which a Jewish cultural renaissance might develop.

=== Conquest of labor ===
In the early 20th century a more ideologically motivated wave of Zionist immigrants arrived in Palestine. With them, the Zionist movement began to emphasize the so-called "conquest of labor", the belief that the employment of exclusively Jewish labor was the pre-condition for the development of an independent Jewish society in Palestine. The goal was to build a "pure Jewish settlement" in Palestine on the basis of "100 per cent Jewish labor" and the claim to an exclusively Jewish, highly productive economy. The Zionist leadership aimed to establish a fully autonomous and independent Jewish economic sector to create a new type of Jewish society. This new society was intended to reverse the traditional economic structure seen in the Jewish Diaspora, characterized by a high number of middlemen and a scarcity of productive workers. By developing fundamental sectors such as industry, agriculture, and mining, the goal was to "normalize" Jewish life that had grown "abnormal" as a result of living amongst non-Jews. Most of the Zionist leadership saw it as imperative to employ strictly Jewish workers in order to ensure the Jewish character of the colonies. Another factor, according to Benny Morris, was the worry that "employment of Arabs would lead to 'Arab values' being passed on to Zionist youth and nourish the colonists' tendency to exploit and abuse their workers", as well as security concerns.

The employment of exclusively Jewish labor was also intended to avoid the development of a national conflict in conjunction with a class-based conflict. The Zionist leadership believed that by excluding Arab workers they would stimulate class conflict only within Arab society and prevent the Jewish-Arab national conflict from attaining a class dimension. While the Zionist settlers of the First Aliyah had ventured to create a "pure Jewish settlement," they did grow to rely on Arab labor due to the lack of availability of Jewish laborers during this period. With the arrival of the more ideologically driven settlers of the second aliyah, the idea of "avoda ivrit" would become more central. The future leaders of the Zionist movement saw an existential threat in the employment of Arab labor, motivating the movement to work towards a society based on purely Jewish labor.

=== Racial conceptions of Jewish identity ===
In the late 19th century, amid attempts to apply science to notions of race, some of the founders of Zionism (such as Max Nordau) sought to reformulate conceptions of Jewishness in terms of racial identity and the "race science" of the time. They believed that this concept would allow them to build a new framework for collective Jewish identity, and thought that biology might provide "proof" for the "ethnonational myth of common descent" from the biblical land of Israel. Countering antisemitic claims that Jews were both aliens and a racially inferior people, these Zionists drew on and appropriated elements from various race theories, (Note: "If anything, the first decades of Zionism bear out an affinity with some of the more unsavoury 'regenerative' discourses of the late nineteenth century, particularly Social Darwinism, eugenics, nationalism, and colonialism, precisely because Zionism – partly as a project of self-legitimacy – was both a Jewish response to and extension of these very same discourses." Presner 2007, p. 4) to argue that only a home for the Jewish people could enable the physical regeneration of the Jewish people and a renaissance of pride in their ancient cultural traditions. According to Nur Masalha, Zionist nationalism embraced pan-Germanic ideologies, which stressed the concept of das Volk: people of shared ancestry should pursue separation and establish a unified state.

The contrasting assimilationist viewpoint was that Jewishness consisted in an attachment to Judaism as a religion and culture. Both the orthodox and liberal establishments often rejected this idea. Subsequently, Zionist and non-Zionist Jews vigorously debated aspects of this proposition in terms of the merits or otherwise of diaspora life. While Zionism embarked on its project of social engineering in Mandatory Palestine, ethnonationalist politics on the European continent strengthened and, by the 1930s, some German Jews, acting defensively, asserted Jewish collective rights by redefining Jews as a race after Nazism rose to power.

With the establishment of Israel in 1948, the "ingathering of the exiles", and the Law of Return, the question of Jewish origins and biological unity came to assume particular importance during early nation building. Conscious of this, Israeli medical researchers and geneticists were careful to avoid any language that might resonate with racial ideas. Themes of "blood logic" or "race" have nevertheless been described as a recurrent feature of modern Jewish thought in both scholarship and popular belief. (Note: "throughout all of the de-racializing stages of twentieth-century social thought, Jews have continued to invoke blood logic as a way of defining and maintaining group identity...'race' is a significant component not only of scholarly or academic modern Jewish thought, but also of popular or everyday Jewish thought. It is one of the building blocks of contemporary Jewish identity construction, even if there are many who would dispute the applicability of biological or racial categories to Jews." (Hart 2011, pp. xxxiv–xxxv)) Despite this, many aspects of the role of race in the formation of Zionist concepts of a Jewish identity were rarely addressed until recently.

Israel currently may require DNA tests to determine the necessary Jewish identity of those seeking to immigrate under the Law of Return.

== Historical and religious background ==
In 1880, there were 8 million Jews in the world, 90% of whom lived in Europe. Of these, three quarters lived in Eastern Europe, and the vast majority of them lived in the territories of the Russian Empire, under Tsarist rule. Eastern European Jews did not benefit from the process of secularization and the project of Jewish emancipation that followed the French Revolution in Western Europe; most Jews living under Russian rule suffered from poverty and antisemitism, forced to live in the Pale of Settlement and subjected to waves of pogroms.

In the 19th century, too, the idea spread widely in Europe and beyond that nations, generally distinguished by a unique language, were the essential units into which humans were naturally divided. Throughout the century, this idea shaped the struggles of various peoples in overthrowing what they saw as foreign—and therefore illegitimate—rule in order to establish and unify independent nation states. Instances included Greek, Serbian, Polish, Italian, Hungarian, and German national independence movements, as well as others in Europe. According to Zachary Lockman, these "often raised the question of whether their indigenous Jewish minorities would be accepted as part of the new 'national family'."

=== Concept of "return" ===
The concept of the "return" was a powerful symbol within religious Jewish belief, traditionally emphasizing that their return should be determined by Divine Providence rather than human action. The cultural memory of Jews in the diaspora revered the Land of Israel. Religious tradition held that a future messianic age would usher in their return as a people, a 'return to Zion' commemorated particularly at prayers at the end of Passover and Yom Kippur by the phrasing "next year in Jerusalem". The biblical prophecy of Kibbutz Galuyot, the ingathering of exiles in the Land of Israel as foretold by the Prophets, became a central idea in Zionism. The transformation of this religious, and primarily passive connection between Jews and Palestine, into an active, secular, nationalist movement arose in the context of ideological developments within modern European nations in the 19th century. According to Gideon Shimoni, the religious Judaic notion of being a nation was distinct from the modern European notion of nationalism.

=== Forerunners of Zionism ===
The forerunners of Zionism, rather than being causally connected to the later development of Zionism, are thinkers and activists who expressed some notion of Jewish national consciousness or advocated for the migration of Jews to Palestine. These attempts were not continuous as national movements typically are. The most notable proto-Zionists were rabbis such as Judah Alkalai and Zvi Hirsch Kalischer. Their idea of Jews as a collective was strongly tied to religious notions distinct from the secular movement referred to as Zionism that developed at the end of the century.

In contrast, Moses Hess, who is regarded as the first modern Jewish nationalist, advocated for the establishment of an independent Jewish state in pursuit of the economic and social normalization of the Jewish people. Hess believed that emancipation alone was not a sufficient solution to the problems faced by European Jewry.

Christian restorationist ideas promoting the migration of Jews to Palestine contributed to the ideological and historical context that gave a sense of credibility to these pre-Zionist initiatives. Restorationist ideas were a prerequisite for the success of Zionism, since although it was created by Jews, Zionism was dependent on support from Christians, although it is unclear how much Christian ideas influenced the early Zionists. Zionism was also dependent on the thinkers of the Haskalah or Jewish enlightenment, such as Peretz Smolenskin in 1872, although it often depicted it as its opponent.

== History ==
=== Proto-Zionism ===
In 1863 Moses Montefiore expressed his opinion that "Palestine must belong to the Jews".

=== Birth of Zionism ===
Ideas of Jewish cultural unity developed a specifically political expression in the 1860s as Jewish intellectuals began promoting the idea of Jewish nationalism. This emerged amid the late 19th century European trend of national revivals.

By the 1870s, Jews had achieved almost complete civic emancipation in all the states of western and central Europe, while emancipation in Eastern Europe progressed more slowly. Zionism emerged among largely secularized and formally emancipated central European Jews, who nonetheless felt excluded from local national movements. Some Jewish intellectuals and religious traditionalists also framed assimilation as a humiliating negation of Jewish cultural distinctiveness.

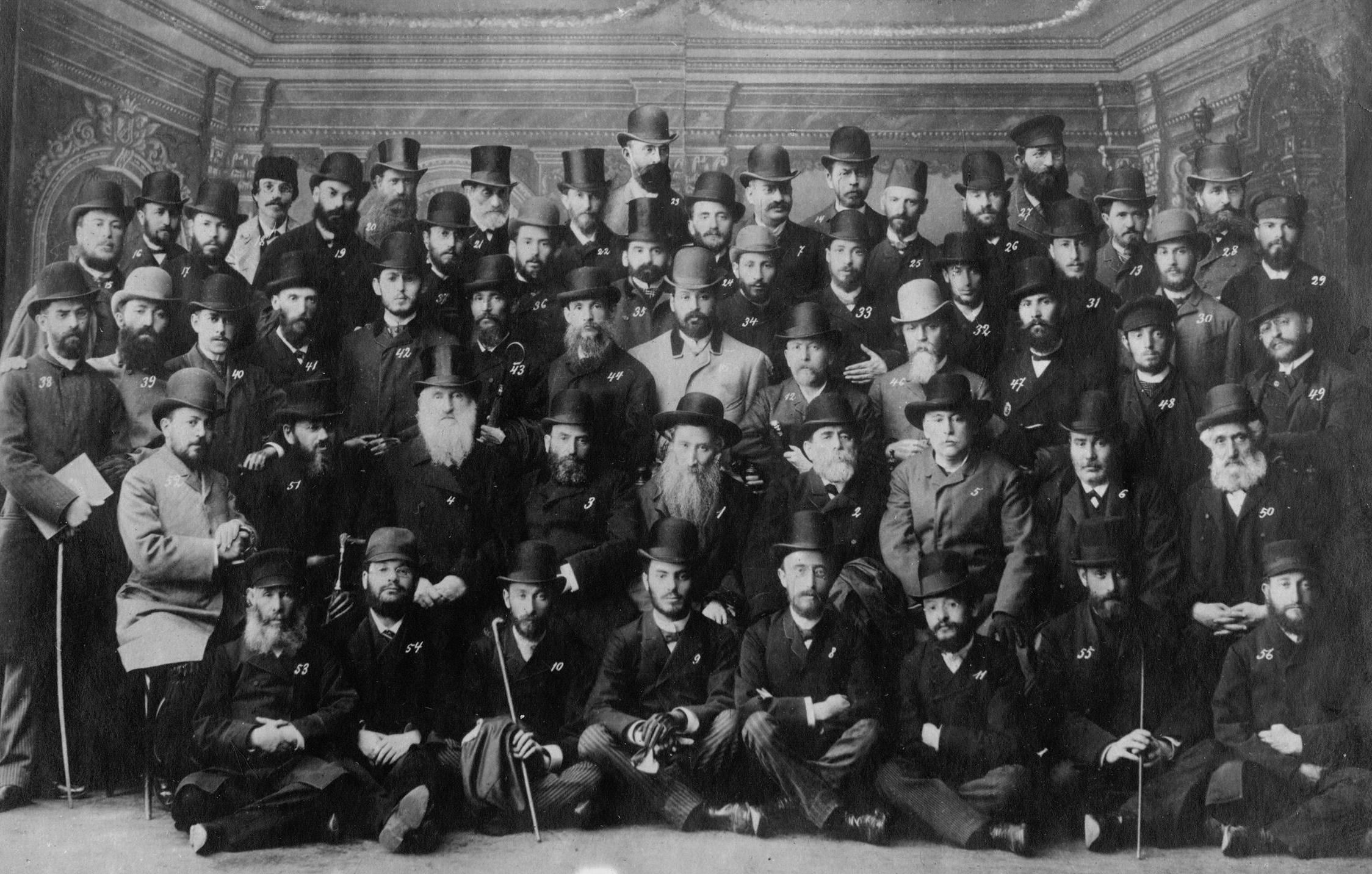
The first general assembly of the Society for the Support of Jewish Farmers and Artisans in Syria and Palestine, also known as the Odessa Committee, 1890

After a new wave of Russian pogroms, the former assimilationist Leon Pinsker concluded that antisemitism was primarily driven by Jews' lack of a homeland, and that the solution was for Jews to become a "normal" nation and acquire a homeland where they would have sovereignty.

The pogroms motivated a small number of Jews to establish groups in the Pale of Settlement (a region in western Russia) and Poland, aimed at supporting Jewish emigration to Palestine. Pinsker's pamphlet Autoemancipation was their ideological charter around which they confederated into Hibbat Zion ("Lovers of Zion") in 1887, where Pinsker took a leading role. The groups that formed Hibbat Zion included the Bilu group, which established its first settlement in 1882. These were the first of several aliyahs, or waves of settlement, that led to the eventual establishment of the state of Israel. Conditions in Eastern Europe eventually provided Zionism with a base of Jews seeking to overcome external ostracism from the Tsarist regime and internal changes within the Jewish communities there. At the end of the 19th century, Jews remained a small minority in Palestine.

A key event that put the modern Zionist movement in motion was the Dreyfus affair, which erupted in France in 1894. The case had a profound impact on Central and Western European Jews. Among those who witnessed the event was Herzl.

In his 1896 manifesto Der Judenstaat ("The Jewish State"), Herzl proposed a state in which Jews would form the majority and therefore be politically dominant. Like Pinsker, Herzl saw antisemitism as a reality that could only be addressed by the territorial concentration of Jews in a Jewish state. His project was secular, the selection of Palestine motivated by the credibility the name would give to the movement.

Ahad Ha'am (Asher Ginsberg), the founder of cultural Zionism, criticized the lack of Jewish cultural activity and creativity in Herzl's envisioned state, which Ginsberg called "the state of the Jews" rather than a Jewish state. He believed the recovery of a Jewish identity through national cultural revival should be Zionism's priority.

Herzl's efforts led to the First Zionist Congress at Basel in 1897, which created the Zionist Organization (ZO), renamed in 1960 as World Zionist Organization (WZO), and adopted the Basel Program, which codified the official objective of establishing a legally recognized home for the Jewish people in Palestine.

=== Territories considered ===
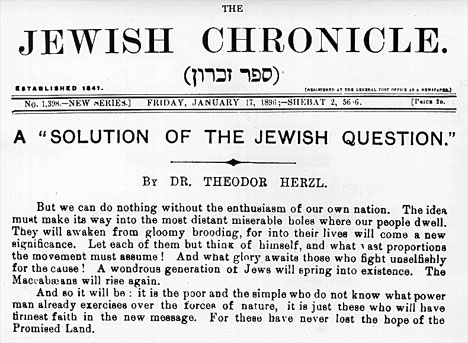
Front page of The Jewish Chronicle, January 17, 1896, showing an article by Theodor Herzl, a month prior to the publication of his pamphlet Der Judenstaat

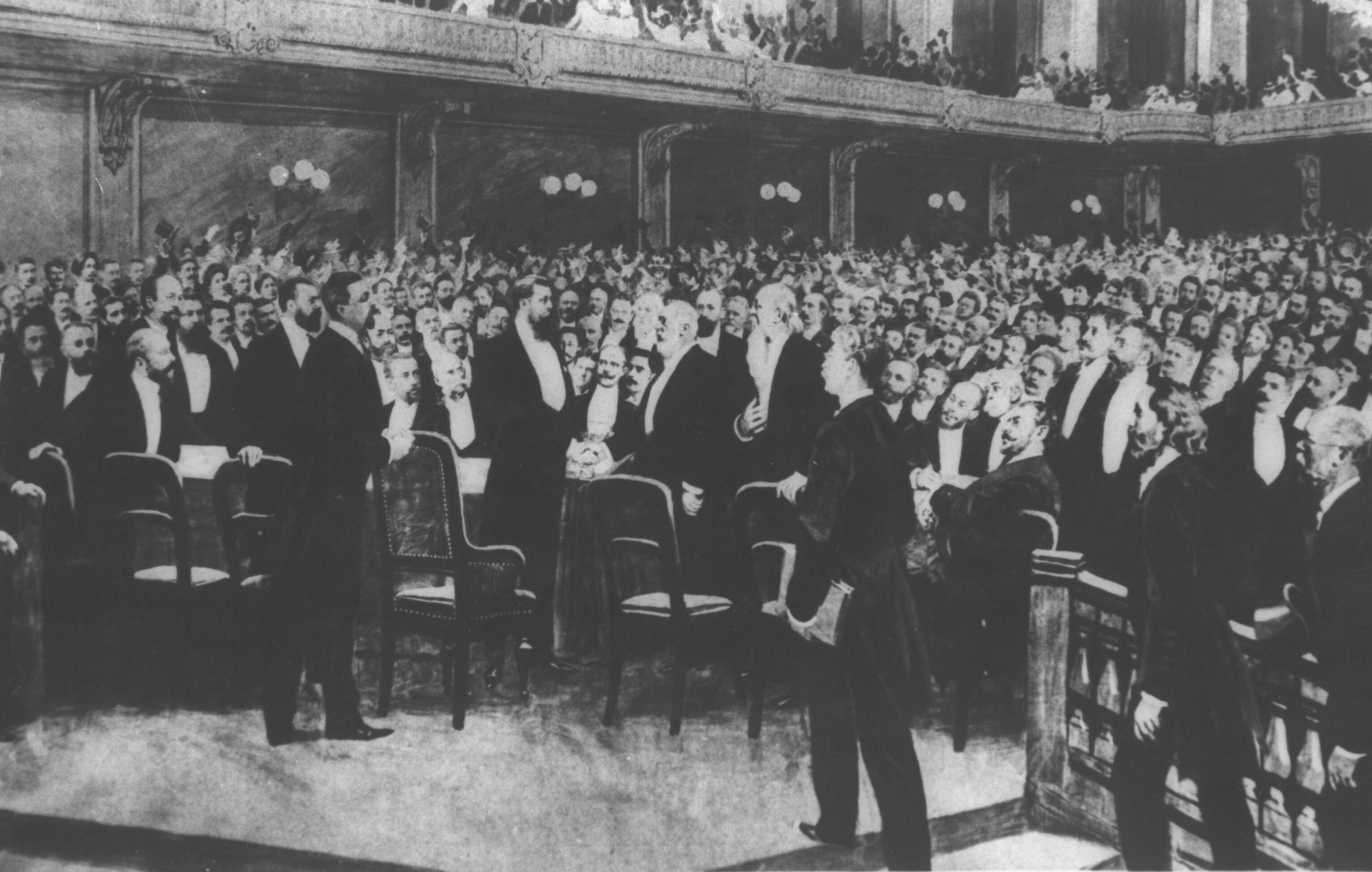
The delegates at the First Zionist Congress in 1897, held in Basel, Switzerland

Throughout the first decade of the Zionist movement, Herzl and other Zionist figures considered locations for a Jewish state outside of the Land of Israel, such as "Uganda" (actually parts of British East Africa that are today in Kenya), Argentina, Cyprus, Mesopotamia, Mozambique, and the Sinai Peninsula.

=== Early settlement in Palestine ===
In the early twentieth century, Zionists established settlements and an independent financial and monetary system in Palestine, the latter due to the instability in the local economy and Ottoman currency. Despite their small numbers, Zionist settlement instilled a fear of territorial displacement in the local population, which led to Palestinian resistance and the settlers' eventual use of military force. Local leaders had made largely unheeded warnings in the 1880s about Jewish immigration, until rural Palestinians experienced major changes after World War I when Zionist land purchases increased. From almost the beginning of Zionist settlement, Palestinians viewed Zionism as an expansionist endeavor. According to Israeli historian Benny Morris, Zionism was inherently expansionist and always had the goal of turning the entirety of Palestine into a Jewish state. In addition, Morris describes the Zionists as intent on politically and physically dispossessing the Arabs. By the early 20th century, there were fourteen Zionist settlements in Palestine, established through land purchases from both local and external landowners.

The Zionist leadership saw land acquisition, strategically aimed to create continuous Jewish-owned territory, as essential for their goals. The WZO established the Jewish National Fund (JNF) in 1901, with the stated goal "to redeem the land of Palestine as the inalienable possession of the Jewish people." Zionists felt that the land should not be sold or leased to a non-Jew nor should the land be worked by Arabs, though most Zionists continued to employ fellaheen to perform labor on their lands. The land purchased was primarily from absentee landlords, and upon purchase of the land, the tenant farmers who traditionally had rights of usufruct were often expelled. Herzl publicly opposed this dispossession, but wrote privately in his diary: "We shall try to spirit the penniless population across the border by procuring employment for it in the transit countries, while denying it any employment in our country... Both the process of expropriation and the removal of the poor must be carried out discreetly and circumspectly." The arrival of Zionist settlers to Palestine in the late 19th century is widely seen as the start of the Israeli–Palestinian conflict. Zionists wanted to create a Jewish state in Palestine with as much land, as many Jews, and as few Palestinian Arabs as possible.

In 1903, 'Eretz Israel assembly' was held, chaired by Menachem Ussishkin. Under his leadership, professional and political institutions were established, which laid a path to a more lasting Zionist presence. Ussishkin delineated three methods for the Zionist movement to acquire land: by force and conquest, by expropriation via governmental authority, and by purchase. The only option available to the movement at the moment in his perspective was the last one, "until at some point we become rulers".

==== Second Aliyah ====
The Second Aliyah, starting in 1904, established the key elements for the Jewish society in Palestine envisioned by the Zionist movement. These included the first two political parties, the socialist Po'alei Zion and the non-socialist Ha-Po'el Ha-Tza'ir and the first kibbutzim, which were fundamental in the formation of the Israeli state. They also formed the first underground military group, Ha-Shomer, which later evolved into the Haganah and became the core of the Israeli army. Many leaders of the Zionist national movement were products of the Second Aliyah. The Zionists of the second aliyah were more ideologically motivated than those of the first aliyah. In particular, they sought the "conquest of labor", which entailed the exclusive employment of Jews in the Zionist economy.

=== The Balfour Declaration and World War I ===
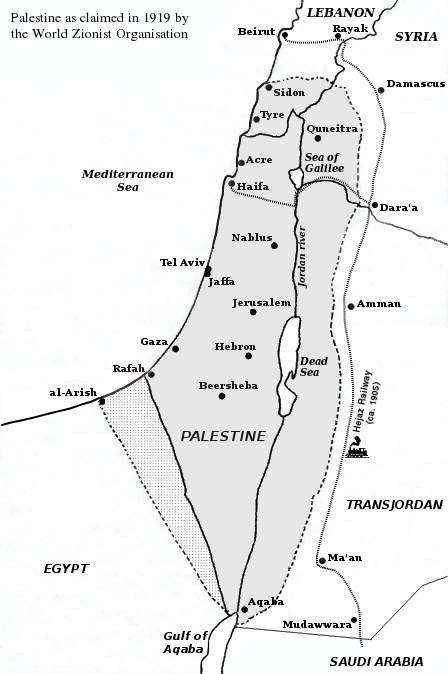
Palestine as claimed by the World Zionist Organization in 1919 at the Paris Peace Conference

While there were 85,000 Jews living in Palestine in 1914, that number went down to 56,000 by 1917. The Arab population also suffered greatly during this time. When the Ottoman Empire entered the war on Germany's side in October 1914, tens of thousands of Russian Jews became enemy citizens, and many opted to leave rather than become Ottoman citizens subject to conscription. This gave the Ottomans an opportunity to suppress the Zionist movement. Ottoman requisitions, ostensibly to support the war effort, disproportionately affected Jewish communities, including confiscating all their weapons. On January 17, 1914, the Ottomans announced, with no prior warning, that all foreign nationals must immediately board a ship in Jaffa to be taken to Alexandria. In October 1917, after the Ottomans discovered that Nili, a Jewish spy ring, had been giving intelligence to the British, they arrested people at random and imposed a curfew as collective punishment. Most Zionists came to the conclusion that there was no hope of change under the Ottomans and therefore supported the British conquest of Palestine, and viewed the British as redeemers.

At the start of World War I, the Zionist leadership attempted to persuade the British government of the benefits of sponsoring a Jewish colony in Palestine. Their main initial success was in establishing a lobbying group centered around the Rothschild family, largely driven by Chaim Weizmann. In the 1917 Balfour Declaration, Britain declared its support for "the establishment in Palestine of a national home for the Jewish people". The declaration was largely motivated by war-time considerations and antisemitic preconceptions about the putative influence Jews had on the Tsarist government and in the shaping of American policy. Though his decision was also motivated by religious convictions, (Note: "The irony here is in the now well-documented understanding that Lord Balfour was himself deeply religious and that his thinking on the projected post-World War 1 fate of Palestine was influenced by his expectations of the fulfullment of biblical prophecy. What disappointed Balfour, Hechler and Kook was that the secular Jewish settlers of British Mandate Palestine did not see divine Providence at work in international affairs.") Balfour himself had passed the Aliens Act 1905, which aimed to keep Eastern European Jews out of Britain. (Note: Brian Klug states that "Keeping Jews out of Britain and packing them off to Palestine were just two sides of the same antisemitic coin") More decisive were Britain's colonial and imperial geopolitical goals in the region, specifically in retaining control over the Suez Canal by establishing a pro-British state in the region.

For Weizmann, Palestine was a Jewish and not an Arab country. The state he sought at that period would stretch to the east of the Jordan River and extend to the Litani River (a river in Lebanon, then part of the Ottoman Empire). Weizmann's strategy involved incrementally approaching this goal over a long period, in the form of settlement and land acquisition. (Note: Avi Shlaim 2014, The Iron Wall: Israel and the Arab World (Updated and Expanded). Quotation: "In the period 1918–20 the Zionists put forward their own maximalist interpretation of the Balfour Declaration. They wanted international recognition of the Jewish claim to Palestine, and they wanted the Jewish national home to stretch across both banks of the river Jordan. When Weizmann was asked at the Paris peace conference what was meant by a Jewish national home, he famously replied, "To make Palestine as Jewish as England is English." He was careful, however, not to speak openly in terms of a state, so as not to give substance to the charge that the Jewish minority planned to make itself master over the Arab majority. Although a Jewish state with a Jewish majority was his ultimate and unchanging aim, he believed in working toward this goal in a gradual, evolutionary, and nonprovocative fashion.") Weizmann was open to the idea of Arabs and Jews jointly running Palestine through an elected council with equal representation, but he did not view the Arabs as equal partners in negotiations about the country's future. In particular, he was steadfast in his view of the "moral superiority" of the Jewish claim to Palestine over the Arab claim and believed these negotiations should be conducted solely between Britain and the Jews. According to Zionist Israeli historian Simha Flapan, the essential assumptions of Weizmann's strategy were later adopted by David Ben-Gurion and subsequent Zionist leaders.

=== King–Crane Commission ===
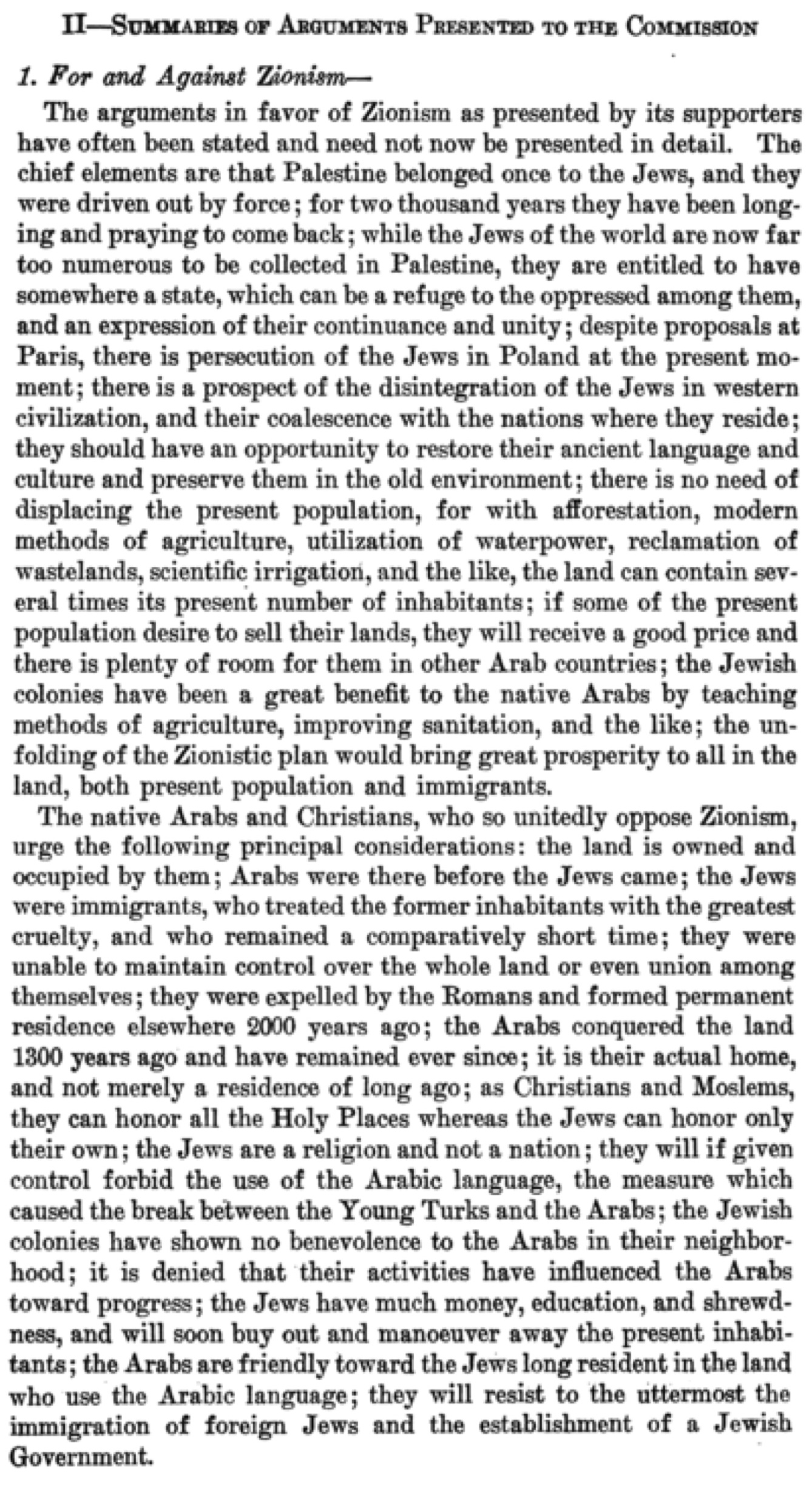
During the 1919 Paris Peace Conference, an Inter-Allied Commission was sent to Palestine to assess the views of the local population; the report summarized the arguments received from petitioners for and against Zionism.

In 1919, the US-based King–Crane Commission started with a strongly sympathetic disposition towards Zionism but concluded that the maximum Zionist demands implied subjection of Palestinians to Jewish rule and that this was a violation of the principle of self-determination, given the anti-Zionist sentiment of the non-Jewish population. The report stated that "The initial claim, often submitted by Zionist representatives, that they have a 'right' to Palestine based on occupation of two thousand years ago, can barely be seriously considered." Consequently, it recommended a considerably "modified" or "reduced" version of the Zionist programme, with Palestine as a Jewish national home but not a Jewish state.

=== Beginning of Revisionist Zionism ===
Ze'ev Jabotinsky founded the Revisionist Party in 1925, which took on a more militant ethos and openly maximalist agenda than Weizmann and Ben-Gurion. Jabotinsky rejected Weizmann's strategy of incremental state building, instead preferring to immediately declare sovereignty over the entire region, which extended to both the East and West bank of the Jordan river. Like Weizmann and Herzl, Jabotinsky also believed that the support of a Great Power was essential to the success of Zionism. From early on, Jabotinksy openly rejected the possibility of a "voluntary agreement" with the Arabs of Palestine. He instead believed in building an "iron wall" of Jewish military force to break Arab resistance to Zionism, at which point an agreement could be established. Jabotinsky's "iron wall" strategy would have a lasting effect on the Zionist perspective towards the demographic problem posed by the presence of the local Palestinian population. Both the left and right factions of Zionism would rely on this strategy of leveraging military strength in pursuit of political aspirations.

=== British Mandate and development of the Zionist quasi-state ===
After the war, the plan for a greater Arab kingdom under the Hashemite family was abandoned when King Faisal was expelled from Damascus by the French in 1920. In parallel, the Zionist demand for a clear British acknowledgment of the entirety of Palestine as the Jewish national home was rejected. Instead, Britain committed only to establishing a Jewish national home "in Palestine" and promised to facilitate this without prejudicing the rights of existing "non-Jewish communities"—these qualifying statements aroused the concern of Zionist leaders at the time.

The British mandate over Palestine, established in 1922, was based on the Balfour Declaration, privileging the Jewish minority over the Arab majority. In addition to declaring British support for the establishment of a "Jewish national home" in Palestine, the mandate included provisions facilitating Jewish immigration, and granting the Zionist movement the status of representing Jewish national interests. In particular, the Jewish Agency, the embodiment of the Zionist movement in Palestine, was made a partner of the mandatory government, acquiring international diplomatic status and representing Zionist interests before the League of Nations and other international venues.

The British mandate effectively established a Jewish quasi-state in Palestine, lacking only full sovereignty. This lack of sovereignty was crucial for Zionism at this early stage, as the Jewish population was too small to defend itself against the Arabs of Palestine. The British presence provided a necessary safeguard for Jewish nationalism. To achieve political independence, Jews needed Britain's support, particularly in land purchase and immigration. Following the Balfour Declaration, Jewish immigration to Palestine grew. According to the Peel Report, 9,149 immigrants arrived in 1921, 33,801 in 1925, dropping to less than 3,000 in 1927 and in 1928, and rising dramatically after Hitler's seizure of control in Germany in 1933, with 61,854 arriving in 1935. By the end of the mandate period, the Jewish population in Palestine nearly tripled, eventually reaching one third of the country's population. In this period the Palestine Jewish Colonization Association, the Jewish National Fund and other Zionist organizations purchased land and started agricultural colonies, with 212,500 acres acquired between 1922 and 1932.

The nucleus of the Jewish quasi-state was the Histadrut, established in 1920 as an independent social, political and economic institution. (Note: "The Histadrut is not a trade union, not a political party, not acooperative society, nor is it a mutual aid association, although it doesengage in trade union activity, in politics, cooperative organizationand mutual aid. But it is much more than that. The Histadrut is a covenant of builders of a homeland, founders of a state, renewers of anation, builders of an economy, creators of culture, reformers of a society.") The Histadrut also exercised significant control over the Haganah, a Jewish defense force formed in 1920 in reaction to Arab riots. Originally created to defend the community, Haganah evolved into a permanent underground reserve army fully integrated into the Jewish political structure. Although the British authorities disapproved of the Haganah, particularly its method of stealing arms from British bases, they did not disband it. The Histadrut operated as a completely independent entity, without interference from the British mandate authorities. Ben-Gurion saw the Histadrut's detachment from socialist ideology to be one of its key strengths; indeed it was the General Organization of Workers in Israel. In particular, the Histadrut worked towards national unity and aimed to dominate the capitalist system en route to gaining political power, not to create a socialist utopia.

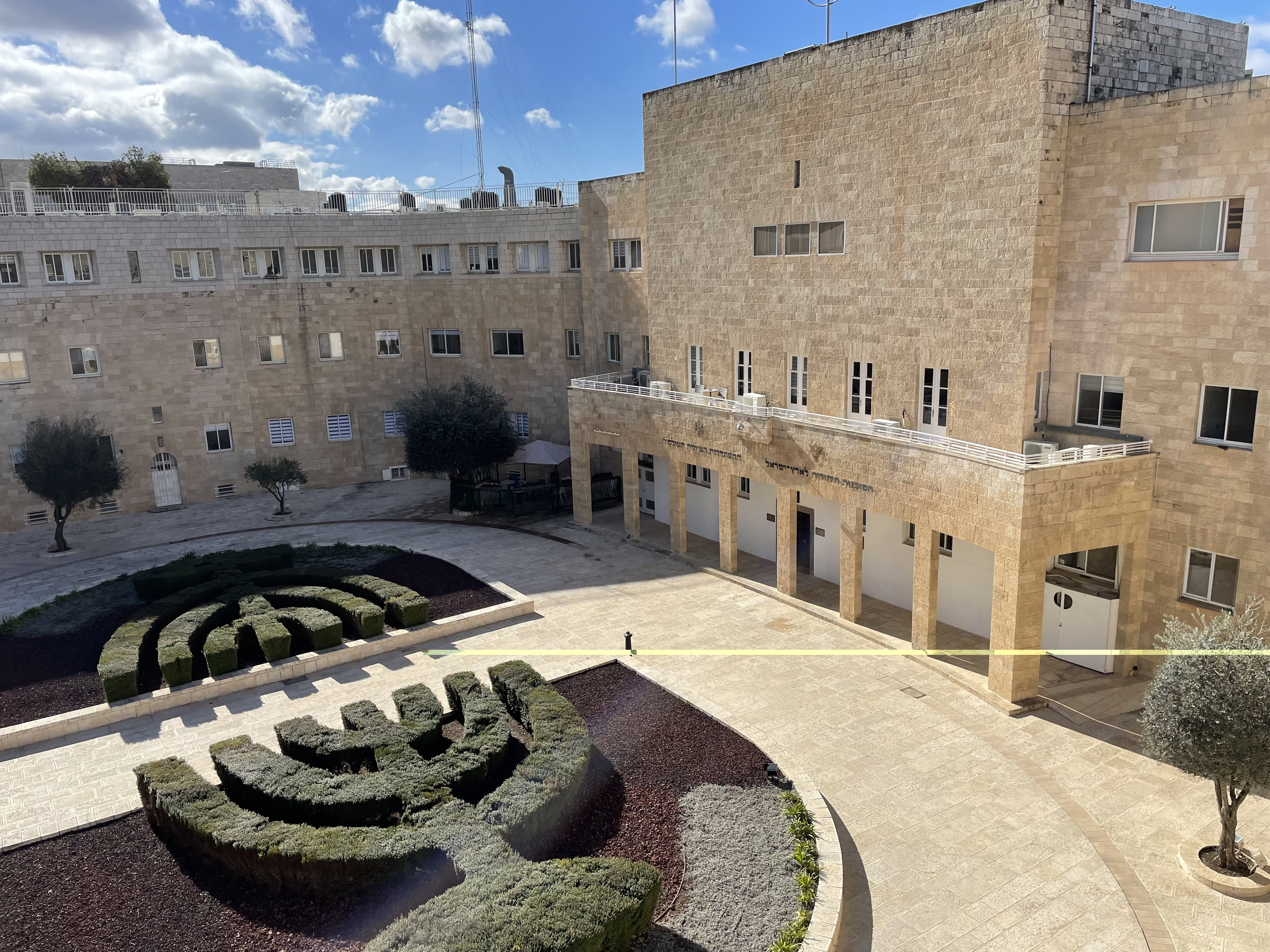
The National Institutions House in the Rehavia neighborhood of Jerusalem houses the World Zionist Organization, Jewish National Fund - Keren Kayemet L'Israel (JNF-KKL), Jewish Agency, and Keren Hayesod

As secretary general of the Histadrut and leader of the Zionist labor movement, Ben-Gurion adopted similar strategies and objectives as Weizmann during this period, disagreeing primarily on issues of specific tactical moves up until 1939. The middle class grew dramatically in size with the arrival of the fourth aliyah in 1924, motivating a political shift within the labor movement. It was during this period that the political strategy of the labor movement would solidify. The founding of the Mapai party unified the labor movement, making it the dominant force. The party saw economic control as essential to facilitating Zionist settlement and achieving political power: "the economic question is not one of class; it is a national question". For Ben-Gurion, the transformation from "working class to nation" was intertwined with his rejection of diaspora life, as he would declare: the "weak, unproductive, parasitical Jewish masses" must be converted "to productive labor" in service of the nation.

Sara Roy argues that the mandatory administration implemented policies that favored the development of the capitalist sector, predominantly associated with the Jewish community, while disadvantaging the Arab non-capitalist sector. Between 1933 and 1937, government spending was concentrated in two main areas—development and economic services, and defense—with the former focusing on infrastructural improvements (such as railways, roads, bridges, and other public works) that were particularly beneficial for capitalist production. The mandate also included an article describing self-governing institutions intended only for the Jewish population of Palestine. No similar support or recognition was provided to the Arab majority during the time of the mandate. By enabling the Zionist institutions to serve as a parallel government to the Mandate, Roy argues, the British facilitated the separation of the economy and legitimized their quasi-state status. Accordingly, these institutions were able to funnel resources into the Jewish sector in Palestine.

=== Zionist policies and the 1936–1939 Arab Revolt ===
For the Zionist movement, economic development and policies were a mechanism by which political aims could be achieved. A new economic sector exclusively for Jews, controlled by the Labor Zionist movement, was established with support from the Jewish National Fund and the agricultural workers' Histadrut. Despite the universalist ideals of Zionist pioneering, this new Jewish economic sector was fundamentally based on exclusionary practices. The goal of achieving "100 percent of Hebrew labour" was the primary driver of the territorial, economic and social separation between Jews and Arabs.

The Zionist economic platform was partially based on the assumption (eventually demonstrated incorrect) that economic benefits to the Arabs of Palestine would pacify opposition to the movement. For the Zionist leadership, the economic status and development of the Arabs of Palestine should be compared with Arabs of other countries, rather than with the Jews of Palestine. Accordingly, disproportionate gains in Jewish development were acceptable as long as the status of the Arab sector did not worsen. While British support for Zionist aspirations in Palestine established the parameters within which the Arab economy could develop, Zionist policies reinforced these limitations. Most notable are the exclusion of Arab labor from Jewish enterprise and the expulsion of Arab peasants from Jewish-owned land. Both of these had limited impact in scope but reinforced the structural limitations put in place by British policies.

With the rise to power of the Nazis in 1933, the Jewish community was increasingly persecuted and driven out. This "toughened the Zionist position vis-à-vis the Arab and British positions", according to Pappé, with Ben-Gurion writing in his diaries that "settlement and, when circumstances would allow it, the transfer of the indigenous population would ensure the realization of the Zionist dream." Additionally, the discriminatory immigration laws of the US, UK and other countries preferable to German Jews led to more than 60,000 Jews arriving in Palestine in 1935 alone. Ben-Gurion would go on to write in what became known as the 1937 Ben-Gurion letter that a high rate of immigration would allow for the maximalist Zionist goal of a Jewish state in all of Palestine. The Arab community openly pressured the mandatory government to restrict Jewish immigration and land purchases.

Sporadic attacks in the countryside (described by Zionists and the British as "banditry") reflected widespread anger over the Zionist land purchases that displaced local peasants. Meanwhile, in urban areas, protests against British rule and the increasing influence of the Zionist movement intensified and became more militant in the early 1930s.

The outbreak of violence in the course of the 1936 Arab Revolt was a turning point in Jewish-Arab relations, unifying previously divided factions within the Zionist movement and leading them to view the use of force as a necessary means of defense and deterrence.

During the revolt, the Irgun Zvai Leumi engaged in the use of terror attacks against the Arabs of Palestine. Similarly, for the labor Zionist Palmah, the lines delineating what was acceptable and unacceptable while dealing with Arab villagers were "vague and intentionally blurred". These ambiguous limits practically did not differ from those of the self-described "terrorist" group, Irgun. According to Anita Shapira, beginning in this period, Labor Zionism's use of violence against Palestinians for political means was essentially the same as that of radical conservative Zionist groups.

=== The Peel Commission partition proposal ===
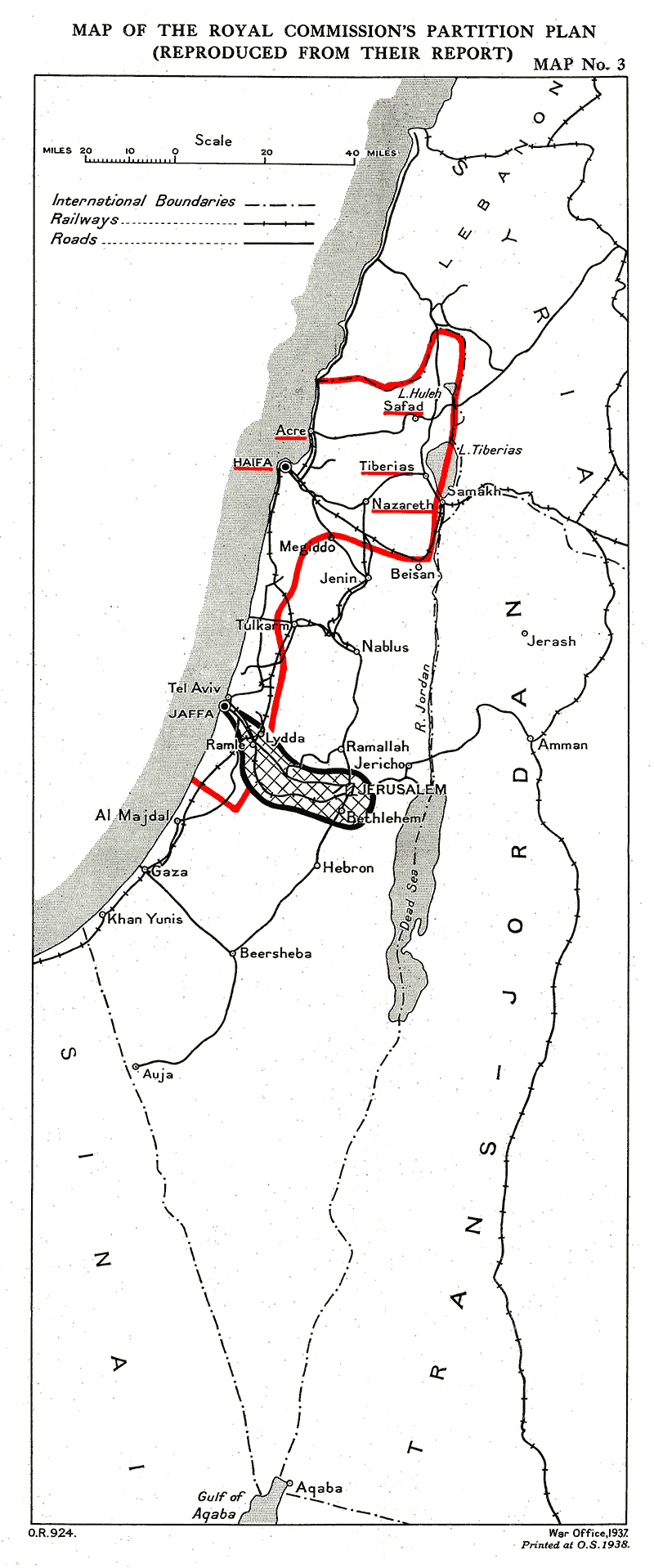
Provisional frontiers of the Palestine partition from the Peel Commission

In response to the revolt, the British appointed in 1937 a commission of inquiry that eventually recommended the partition of the land. The proposal included creating a small Jewish state occupying 17 percent of Mandatory Palestine's territory, while Jerusalem and a corridor to the sea would remain under British control, and the remaining 75 percent of the territory would form a Palestinian state connected to Transjordan under King Abdullah's rule. At this point, Jews owned 5.6% of the land in Palestine; the land allocated to the Jewish state would contain 40 percent of the country's fertile land. The commission also proposed a population transfer of the Palestinian Arabs from the areas designated for the Jewish state, based on the precedent of the 1923 Greek-Turkish population exchange. For Ben-Gurion, the transfer proposal was the most appealing recommendation put forward by the commission. Indeed, this sentiment was deeply ingrained to the extent that Ben Gurion's acceptance of partition was contingent upon the removal of the Palestinian population.

The Zionist leadership viewed the mass transfer of the Arabs as morally permissible, but were unsure of its political effectiveness. Various Zionist leaders spoke in strong support of the transfer plan, asserting that there is nothing immoral about it. (Note: Various leaders spoke strongly in favor of transfer. Ussishkin said, "We cannot start the Jewish state with ... half the population being Arab ... Such a state cannot survive even half an hour." There was nothing immoral about transferring sixty thousand Arab families: "It is most moral.... I am ready to come and defend ... it before the Almighty." Ruppin said: "I do not believe in the transfer of individuals. I believe in the transfer of entire villages." Berl Katznelson, coleader with Ben-Gurion of Mapai, said the transfer would have to be by agreement with Britain and the Arab states: "But the principle should be that there must be a large agreed transfer." Ben-Gurion summed up: "With compulsory transfer we [would] have a vast area [for settlement] .... I support compulsory transfer. I don't see anything immoral in it.") Within the Zionist movement, two perspectives developed with respect to the partition proposal; the first was a complete rejection of partition, the second was acceptance of the idea of partition on the basis that it would eventually allow for expansion to all territories within "the boundaries of Zionist aspirations." It was the right wing of the Zionist movement that put forward the main arguments against transfer, with Jabotinsky strongly objecting it on moral grounds, and others mainly focusing on its impracticality. However, in his last book "The Jewish War Front" published in 1940, after the outbreak of WWII, Jabotinsky no longer ruled out the possibility of voluntary population transfer, though he still didn't view it as a necessary solution. Some leaders, such as Ruppin, Motzkin, and writers such as Israel Zangwill, also referred to transfer as a "voluntary" action that would include some form of compensation. However, "Palestine's Arabs did not wish to evacuate the land of their ancestors... The matter raised ethical questions that troubled the Yishuv". The revolt was inflamed by the partition proposal and continued until 1939 when it was forcefully suppressed by the British.

Later, Vladimir Jabotinsky, the right-wing Zionist leader, drew inspiration from the demographic policies of Stalin, Mussolini and the Nazis, the last of which resulted in the expulsion of 1.5 million Poles and Jews in whose place Germans resettled. In Jabotinsky's assessment:

The world has become accustomed to the idea of mass migrations and has almost become fond of them. Hitler—as odious as he is to us—has given this idea a good name in the world.

By the time of the 1936 Arab revolt, almost all groups within the Zionist movement wanted a Jewish state in Palestine, "whether they declared their intent or preferred to camouflage it, whether or not they perceived it as a political instrument, whether they saw sovereign independence as the prime aim, or accorded priority to the task of social construction". The main debates within the movement at this time were concerning partition of Palestine and the nature of the relationship with the British. The intensity of the revolt, Britain's ambiguous support for the movement and the increasing threat against European Jewry during this period motivated the Zionist leadership to prioritize immediate considerations. The movement ultimately favored the notion of partition, primarily out of practical considerations and partially out of a belief that establishing a Jewish state over all of Palestine would remain an option. At the 1937 Zionist congress, the Zionist leadership adopted the stance that the land allocated to the Jewish state by the partition plan was inadequate—effectively rejecting the partition plan that faded away in the face of both Arab and Zionist opposition.

In response to Ben-Gurion's 1938 quote that "politically we are the aggressors and they [the Palestinians] defend themselves", Israeli historian Benny Morris says, "Ben-Gurion, of course, was right. Zionism was a colonizing and expansionist ideology and movement", and that "Zionist ideology and practice were necessarily and elementally expansionist." Morris describes the Zionist goal of establishing a Jewish state in Palestine as necessarily displacing and dispossessing the Arab population.

=== Nazism, World War II and the Holocaust ===
In 1939, a British White Paper recommended limiting Jewish immigration and land purchase with the objective of maintaining the status quo while the threat of war loomed in Europe. The immigration was to be limited to no more than 75,000 people over the next five years. With Nazi expansionism in Europe, the limits on immigration prompted further militarization, land takeover and illegal immigration efforts by the Zionist movement. World War II broke out as the Zionists were developing their campaign against the White Paper—unable to accept the White Paper or to side against the British, the Zionist movement would ultimately support the British war effort while working to upend the White Paper. (Note: David Ben Gurion famously would say: we shall "fight the White Paper as if there were no Hitler and fight Hitler as if there were no White Paper.") From the start of the second world war, the Zionists pressured the British to organize and train a Jewish "army", culminating in the establishment of a Jewish Brigade and accompanying blue and white flag. The development of this force would further train and enable the already substantial Zionist military capacity. The Haganah was allowed by the British to openly acquire weapons and worked with the British to prepare for a possible Axis invasion.

Despite the White Paper, Zionist immigration and settlement efforts continued during the war period. While immigration had previously been selective, once the details of the Holocaust reached Palestine in 1942, selectivity was abandoned. The official Zionist movement's war effort focused on the survival and development of the Yishuv; Pappe argues that scarce Zionist energy was deployed in support of European Jews. Many of those fleeing Nazi terror in Europe preferred to leave for the United States, however, strict American immigration policies and Zionist efforts led to 10% of the 3 million Jews leaving Europe to settle in Palestine.

In the Biltmore Program of 1942, the Zionist movement would openly declare for the first time its goal of establishing a Jewish state in all of Palestine. At this point, the United States, with its growing economy and unprecedented military force, became a focal point of Zionist political activity that engaged with the American electorate and politicians. American President Truman supported the Biltmore program for the duration of his time in office, largely motivated by humanitarian concerns and the growing influence of the Zionist lobby.

Population of Palestine by ethno-religious groups, excluding nomads, from the 1946 Survey of Palestine
Year	Muslims	Jews	Christians	Others	Total Settled
1922	486,177 (74.9%)	83,790 (12.9%)	71,464 (11.0%)	7,617 (1.2%)	649,048
1931	693,147 (71.7%)	174,606 (18.1%)	88,907 (9.2%)	10,101 (1.0%)	966,761
1941	906,551 (59.7%)	474,102 (31.2%)	125,413 (8.3%)	12,881 (0.8%)	1,518,947
1946	1,076,783 (58.3%)	608,225 (33.0%)	145,063 (7.9%)	15,488 (0.8%)	1,845,559

During World War II, as the horrors of the Holocaust became known, the Zionist leadership formulated the One Million Plan, a reduction from Ben-Gurion's previous target of two million immigrants. Following the end of the war, many stateless refugees, mainly Holocaust survivors, began migrating to Palestine in small boats in defiance of British rules. The Holocaust united much of the rest of world Jewry behind the Zionist project. The British either imprisoned these Jews in Cyprus or sent them to the British-controlled Allied Occupation Zones in Germany. The British, having faced Arab revolts, were now facing opposition by Zionist groups in Palestine for subsequent restrictions on Jewish immigration. In January 1946 the Anglo-American Committee of Inquiry, a joint British and American committee, was tasked to examine political, economic and social conditions in Mandatory Palestine and the well-being of the peoples now living there; to consult representatives of Arabs and Jews, and to make other recommendations 'as necessary' for an interim handling of these problems as well as for their eventual solution. Following the failure of the 1946–47 London Conference on Palestine, at which the United States refused to support the British, leading to both the Morrison–Grady Plan and the Bevin Plan being rejected by all parties, the British decided to refer the question to the UN on February 14, 1947. (Note: The reasons for this decision were explained by Ernest Bevin, then "His Majesty's Principal Secretary of State for Foreign Affairs" in a speech to the House of Commons on February 18, 1947, in which he said: "His Majesty's Government have been faced with an irreconcilable conflict of principles. There are in Palestine about 1,200,000 Arabs and 600,000 Jews. For the Jews the essential point of principle is the creation of a sovereign Jewish State. For the Arabs, the essential point of principle is to resist to the last establishment of Jewish sovereignty in any part of Palestine. The discussions of the last month have quite clearly shown that there is no prospect of resolving this conflict by any settlement negotiated between the parties. But if the conflict has to be resolved by an arbitrary decision, that is not a decision that His Majesty's Government are empowered, as Mandatory, to take. His Majesty's Government have of themselves no power, under the terms of the Mandate, to award the country either to the Arabs or to the Jews, or even to partition it between them.")

=== End of British Mandate and 1948 war ===
Clickable map of Mandatory Palestine with the depopulated locations during the 1947–1949 Palestine war

Towards the end of World War II, the Zionist leadership was motivated more than ever to establish a Jewish state. Without British support, many Zionists considered it necessary to establish the state by force by upending the British position in Palestine. In this the IRA's tactics against Britain in the Irish War of Independence served as a both a model and source of inspiration. (Note: "that a small, determined group of revolutionaries representing a minority view within the wider population could achieve some success against the British Empire helped to convince Zionist radicals that they could be successful. Members of Jewish underground groups . .studied Irish rebels' victory over the superior might of Britain. Ze'ev Jabotinsky, leader of the Irgun, had travelled to Ireland, meeting Irish Volunteer and IRA gunrunner Robert Briscoe, to discuss drilling, training and strategy in fighting the British and to 'learn all he could in order to form a physical force movement in Palestine on the same lines as the IRA'.") The Irgun, the military arm of revisionist Zionists, and Lehi, which sought an alliance with Nazi Germany in 1941, led attacks against the British from 1944, including the King David Hotel bombing and attacks on British immigration and tax offices and police stations. By the war's end, the Haganah joined in the sabotage against the British. The combined impact of US opinion and attacks on British presence eventually led the British to refer the situation to the United Nations in 1947. In response to a United Kingdom government request that the General Assembly "make recommendations under article 10 of the Charter, concerning the future government of Palestine", the United Nations Special Committee on Palestine (UNSCOP) was created on May 15, 1947.

The urgency of the condition of the Jewish refugees in Europe motivated the committee to unanimously vote in favor of terminating the British mandate in Palestine. The disagreement came with regards to whether Palestine should be partitioned or if it should constitute a federal state. American lobbying efforts, pressuring UN delegates with the threat of withdrawal of US aid, eventually secured the General Assembly votes in favor of the partition of Palestine into separate Jewish and Arab states, which was passed November 29, 1947.

Outbursts of violence slowly grew into the wider 1947-1948 civil war in Mandatory Palestine between the Arabs and Zionist militias. By mid-December, the Haganah had shifted to a more "aggressive defense", abandoning notions of restraint it had espoused from 1936 to 1939. The Haganah reprisal raids were often disproportionate to the initial Arab offenses, which led to the spread of violence to previously unaffected areas. The Zionist militias, employed terror attacks against Arab civilian and militia centers and many Palestinians were evicted from their houses. In response, Arabs planted bombs in Jewish civilian areas, particularly in Jerusalem.

The first expulsion of Palestinians began 12 days after the adoption of the UN resolution, and the first Palestinian village was eliminated a month later, in retaliation for Palestinian attacks on convoys and Jewish settlements. In April 1948, Zionist forces began implementing Plan Dalet, destroying Arab towns and villages and expelling civilians, seeking to remove potentially hostile Palestinians. Its implementation decisively contributed to the Palestinian refugee crisis, with Palestine losing much of its indigenous population, and is described by historians such as Ilan Pappé as ethnic cleansing. According to Benny Morris Zionist forces committed 24 massacres of Palestinians in the ensuing war, in part as a form of psychological warfare, the most notorious being the Deir Yassin massacre. The United Nations Conciliation Commission for Palestine estimated that between 1948 and 1949, 710,000 Palestinians were driven out and another 40,000 were internally displaced, primarily as a result of these expulsions and massacres.

Having made little effort to enforce order, the British left Palestine on May 14 without formally transferring power to any local government. A Jewish quasi-state had already been operating under the British for decades. The same day, Ben-Gurion declared the establishment of the state of Israel. The Declaration of Independence of Israel described a democracy with equality of social and political rights for all citizens, and extended a peace offering to neighboring states and their Arab citizens. Masalha notes that the declaration states equality on the basis of citizenship but not nationality. (Note: "In Israel, '"nationality" (Hebrew: "le'um") and "citizenship" (Hebrew: "ezrahut") are two separate, distinct statuses, conveying different rights and responsibilities'. Palestinians in Israel, as non-Jews, can be citizens, but never nationals, and are thus denied 'rights and privileges' enjoyed by those 'who would qualify for Israeli citizenship under the 1950 Law of Return'." White 2012, Spot the Difference)

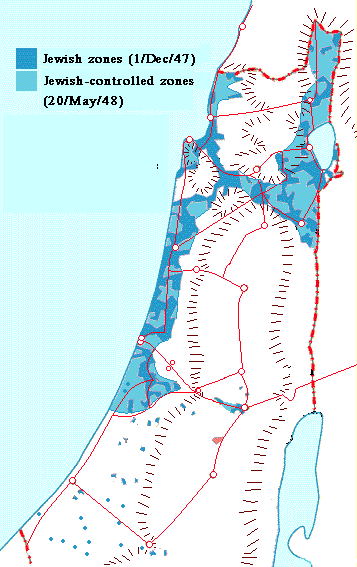
Zionist offensive Plan Dalet (1 April – 14 May 1948; left) and Arab offensive (15 May – 10 June 1948; right) following the Declaration of the Establishment of the State of Israel on May 14 and the termination of the British Mandate for Palestine.

Following the withdrawal of the British and the declaration of Israel's establishment, neighbouring Arab states joined the war beginning the 1948 Arab-Israeli war. The conclusion of this war led to the State of Israel establishing control over 78% of Mandatory Palestine, instead of the 55% from the UN partition plan, and destroying much of Palestinian society and the Arab landscape. Zionist leaders framed the war in biblical and messianic terms as a 'miraculous clearing of the land,' akin to the biblical War of Joshua. Masalha writes that it is not clear who the Yishuv declared independence from, as it was neither from the British colonial rule, which facilitated Jewish settlement against Palestinian wishes, nor from the land's indigenous inhabitants, who had long cultivated and owned it. After the 1949 Armistice Agreements, a series of laws passed by the first Israeli government prevented displaced Palestinians from claiming private property or returning. They and many of their descendants remain refugees supported by UNRWA.

==== Hebraization of names ====
As part of the effort to consolidate its new ownership over the land it had taken over in the 1948 war, the Israeli state worked towards "erasing all traces of its former owners". The project of "Hebraization" of the map, for which the JNF Naming Committee was established, aimed to replace what remained of the Arab towns and villages with newly named Israeli settlements. These names were often based on the Arab names but with a "Hebrew pronunciation" or based on old Hebrew biblical names. This effort also sought to demonstrate continuous Jewish ownership over the land to ancient times.

Prior to 1948, the Zionist movement had limited authority over the use of place names in Palestine. After 1948, the name "Palestine" was removed from Zionist organizations; for example, the Jewish Agency for Palestine, which played a critical role in the founding of the Israeli state in 1948, was renamed the "Jewish Agency for Israel".

=== State of Israel ===
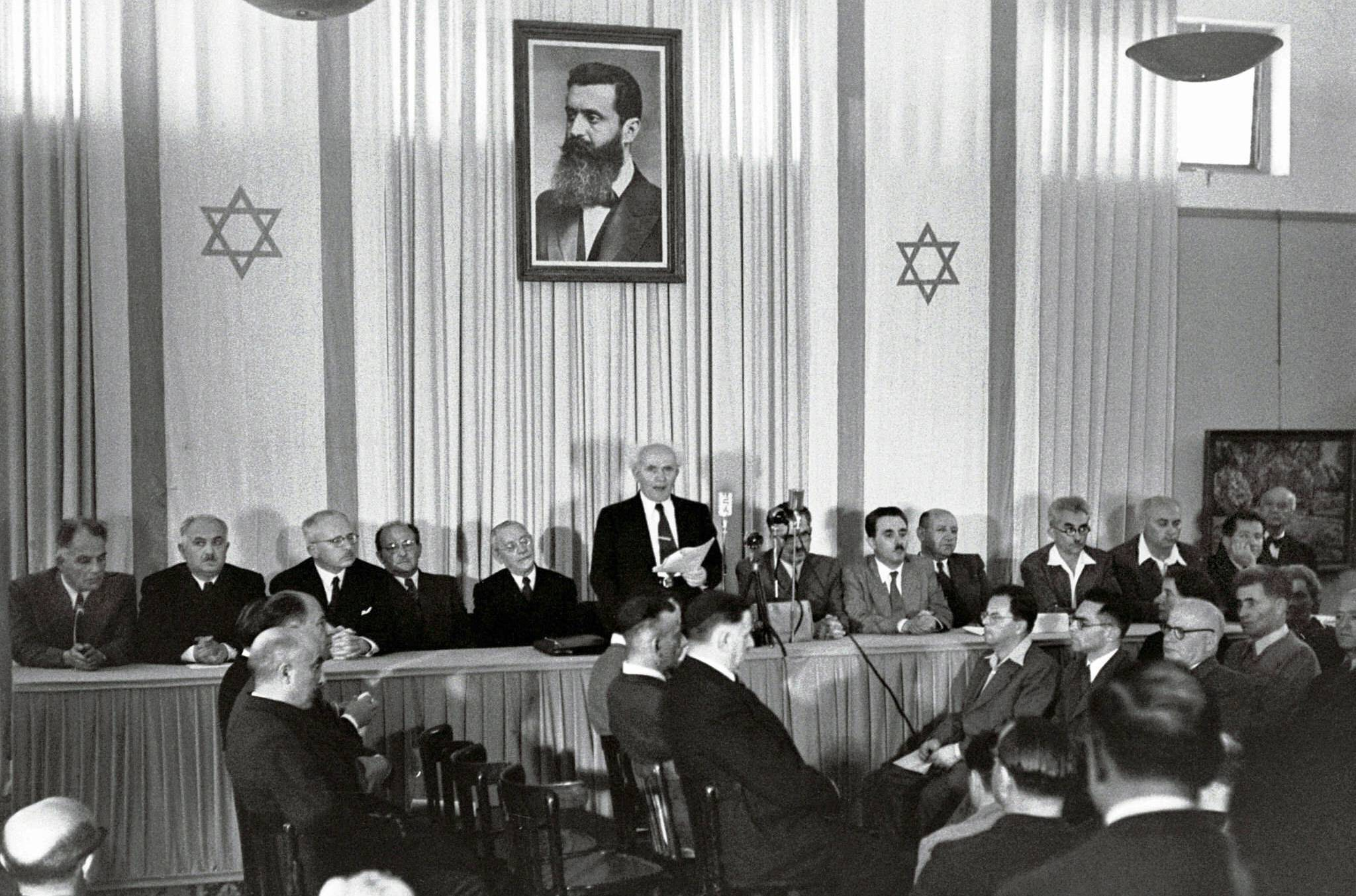
David Ben-Gurion proclaiming Israel's establishment beneath a large portrait of Theodor Herzl

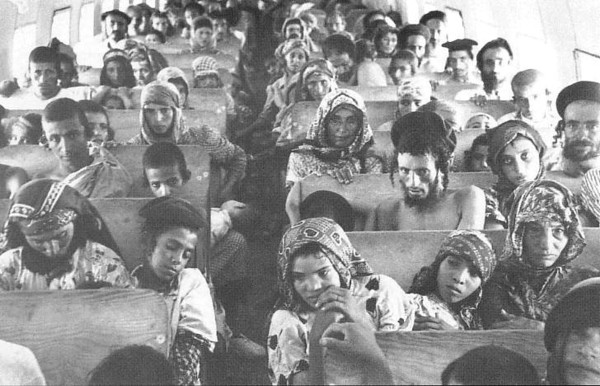
Yemenite Jews on their way to Israel during Operation Magic Carpet

After the establishment of the State of Israel, the World Zionist Organization has functioned mainly as an organization dedicated to assisting and encouraging Jews to migrate to Israel. It has provided political support for Israel in other countries but plays little role in internal Israeli politics. The movement's major success since 1948 was in providing logistical support for Jewish migrants and refugees and, most importantly, in assisting Soviet Jews in their struggle with the authorities over the right to leave the USSR and to practice their religion in freedom, and the exodus of 850,000 Jews from the Arab world, mostly to Israel.

In 1944–45, Ben-Gurion described the One Million Plan to foreign officials as being the "primary goal and top priority of the Zionist movement." The previous immigration restrictions of the British White Paper of 1939 meant that such a plan could not be put into large scale effect until the Israeli Declaration of Independence in May 1948. The new country's immigration policy had some opposition within the new Israeli government, such as those who argued that there was "no justification for organizing large-scale emigration among Jews whose lives were not in danger, particularly when the desire and motivation were not their own" as well as those who argued that the absorption process caused "undue hardship". However, the force of Ben-Gurion's influence and insistence ensured that his immigration policy was carried out.

== Types of Zionism ==
From the turn of the century until the Arab revolt of 1936, there was room for political flexibility within the Zionist movement, many scholars argue that different currents of Zionism have had a shared core framework. Most mainstream histories of the movement delineate a few key strains, many following a taxonomy introduced during the period starting in the late 19th century and continuing into the 1930s: political, practical, socialist, cultural and revisionist. Some scholars emphasise the heterogeneity of these strains of Zionism.

=== Early Zionism ===
Early Zionism consisted of two dominant types, Political Zionism and Practical Zionism, which faded after World War I and the Balfour Declaration.

Political Zionism was led by Theodor Herzl and Max Nordau. This approach was espoused at the Zionist Organization's First Zionist Congress. It focused on a Jewish home as a solution to the "Jewish question" and antisemitism in Europe, centered on gaining Jewish sovereignty (probably within the Ottoman or later British or French empire), and was opposed to mass migration until after sovereignty was granted. It initially considered locations other than Palestine (e.g., in Africa) and did not foresee migration by many Western Jews to the new homeland.

Known in Hebrew as Tzionut Ma'asit, Practical Zionism was led by Moshe Leib Lilienblum and Leon Pinsker and molded by the Hovevei Zion organization. It became dominant after Herzl's death, and differed from Political Zionism in not seeing Zionism as justified primarily by the Jewish Question but rather as an end in itself; it "aspired to the establishment of an elite utopian community in Palestine" through Aliyah. It also differed from Political Zionism in "distrust[ing] grand political actions" and preferring "an evolutionary incremental process toward the establishment of the national home".

=== Labor Zionism ===
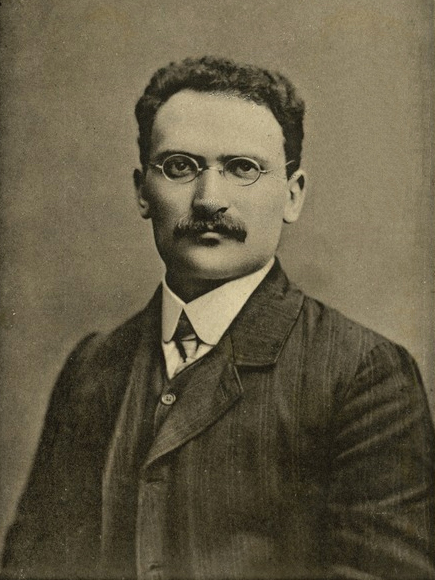
Dov Ber Borochov, one of the leaders of Labor Zionism

Led by socialists Nachman Syrkin, Haim Arlosoroff, Berl Katznelson, and Marxist Ber Borochov, Labor or Socialist Zionism was a form of Zionism that combined messianic tendencies and socialist or social democratic politics. The labor Zionists promoted immigration and settlement, establishing "facts on the ground" as the main path towards state-building.

Labor Zionism became a mass movement with the founding of Poale Zion ("Workers of Zion") groups in Eastern and Western Europe and North America in the 1900s. Poale Zion split between Left and Right after 1917. In 1919, the Right Poale Zion in Palestine disbanded to form the nationalist socialist Ahdut HaAvoda, led by David Ben-Gurion; in 1930, it merged with Hapoel Hatzair, founded by A. D. Gordon, to form Mapai. Labor Zionism, represented by Mapai, became the dominant force in the political and economic life of the Yishuv during the British Mandate of Palestine. It was the dominant ideology of the political establishment in Israel until the 1977 election, when the Israeli Labor Party was defeated. During the early twentieth century, the left wing of this tradition was represented by Hashomer Hatzair, followed by Mapam in the late twentieth century, and Meretz until 2022.

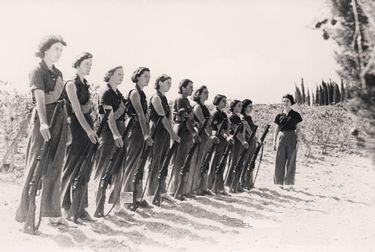
Kibbutznikiyot (female Kibbutz members) in Mishmar HaEmek, during the 1948 Arab–Israeli War. The Kibbutz is the historical heartland of Labor Zionism.

In Labor Zionist thought, a revolution of the Jewish soul and society was believed necessary and achievable in part by Jews moving to Israel and becoming farmers, workers, and soldiers in a country of their own. Labor Zionists established rural communes in Israel called "kibbutzim", a form of cooperative agriculture in which the Jewish National Fund hired Jewish workers under trained supervision. The kibbutzim were a symbol of the Second Aliyah in that they put great emphasis on communalism and egalitarianism, representing Utopian socialism to a certain extent. Furthermore, they stressed self-sufficiency, which became an essential aspect of Labor Zionism.

=== Synthetic and General Zionism ===
Synthetic Zionism, led by Chaim Weizmann, Leo Motzkin and Nahum Sokolow, was an approach that advocated a combination of practical and political Zionism and distanced themselves from the growing Labour, Religious and Revisionist Zionist groups as the movement became polarised between those. General Zionists identified with the liberal European middle class to which many Zionist leaders such as Herzl and Chaim Weizmann aspired. As head of the World Zionist Organization, Weizmann's policies had a sustained impact on the Zionist movement, with Abba Eban describing him as a dominant figure in Jewish life during the interwar period.

=== Revisionist Zionism ===
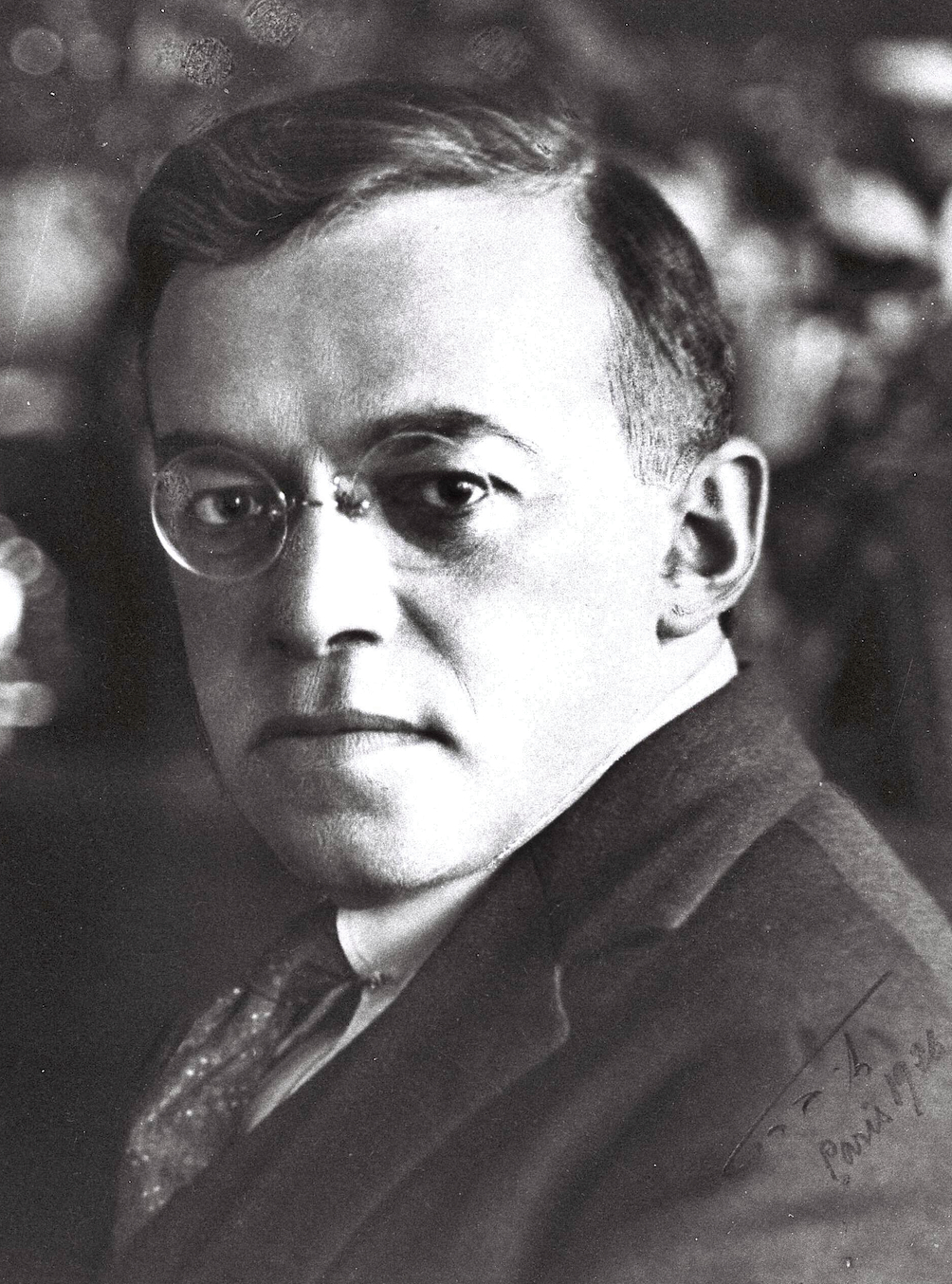
Ze'ev Jabotinsky, founder of Revisionist Zionism

Revisionist Zionism, developed by Ze'ev Jabotinsky in the 1920s, was a right-wing strain of Zionism. It initially believed that a Jewish state must expand to both sides of the Jordan River, i.e. taking Transjordan in addition to all of Palestine. It broke with the WZO in 1935 because of the latter's refusal to declare the establishment of a Jewish state as its immediate aim, and had its own paramilitary organisation, Irgun, from 1931 to 1948.

Followers of Revisionist Zionism developed the Likud Party in Israel, which has dominated most governments since 1977. It advocates Israel's maintaining control of the West Bank, including East Jerusalem, and takes a hard-line approach in the Arab–Israeli conflict.

=== Religious Zionism ===
Initially led by Yitzchak Yaacov Reines and Abraham Isaac Kook, religious Zionism combines religious conservatism and secular nationalism into a patriotic ideology. Adherents believe that the establishment of Israel and the ingathering of exiles there is the beginning of the redemption, the initial stage of the geula. This ideology considers secular Zionism and secular state policies to be holy and part of God's divine plan, and is set apart from other forms by its disavowal of Western democratic and liberal ideology in favor of conservative nationalism. Right-wing religious Zionism is represented today by the Religious Zionist Party, and the smaller left-wing variant by Meimad. The most radical variant of religious Zionism is neo-Zionism, which asserts a biblical right to make Jews the sole inhabitants of Palestine, including the West Bank.

Prior to the 1967 Six-Day War, religious Zionism mostly described support for political Zionism among Orthodox Jews. However, the war and the Israeli conquest of the West Bank, referred to by the movement as Judaea and Samaria, popularized an ideology associated with Kook and the Mercaz HaRav yeshiva. Followers believed the Six Day War was the work of God. They viewed the West Bank as sacred and its settlement as a commandment of God, necessary for the redemption of the Jewish people. Rabbi Zvi Yehuda Kook, the son of Abraham and a major religious Zionist leader and thinker, declared to Israeli leadership in 1967:

I tell you explicitly... that there is a prohibition in the Torah against giving up even an inch of our liberated land. There are no conquests here and we are not occupying foreign land; we are returning to our home, to the inheritance of our forefathers. There is no Arab land here, only the inheritance of our God—the more the world gets used to this thought the better it will be for it and for all of us.

In the 1970s, religious Zionists, such as Shlomo Aviner and Hanan Porat, campaigned against Israeli withdrawal from the West Bank and Sinai Peninsula. Kahanism, a radical branch of religious Zionism, was founded by Rabbi Meir Kahane, whose party, Kach, was eventually banned from the Knesset, but became increasingly influential on Israeli politics. Religious Zionist ideology motivated the assassination of Yitzhak Rabin in 1995, who ceded some territory to the PLO as a part of the Oslo Accords, and several religious Zionist rabbis reacted to the assassination with approval.

=== Liberal Zionism ===
Today, the liberal Zionist perspective criticizes the Israeli occupation of Palestinian territory since 1967 while also promoting the idea of a Jewish state as a necessity. In this vein, liberal Zionism sees Zionist and Israeli activity before 1967, such as the military conquest of Palestine and the expulsion of Palestinians in 1948, as a necessity.

Liberal Zionism, although not associated with any single party in modern Israel, remains a strong trend in Israeli politics advocating free market principles, democracy and adherence to human rights.

Philosopher Carlo Strenger describes a modern-day version of Liberal Zionism, rooted in the original ideology of Herzl and Ahad Ha'am. It is marked by a concern for democratic values and human rights, freedom to criticize government policies without accusations of disloyalty, and rejection of excessive religious influence in public life. Liberal Zionists see that "Jewish history shows that Jews need and are entitled to a nation-state of their own. But they also think that this state must be a liberal democracy, which means that there must be strict equality before the law independent of religion, ethnicity or gender."

=== Cultural Zionism ===
Cultural Zionism or Spiritual Zionism is a strain of Zionism that focused on creating a center in historic Palestine with its own secular Jewish culture and national history, including language and historical roots, rather than on mass migration or state-building. The founder of Cultural Zionism was Asher Ginsberg, better known as Ahad Ha'am. Like Hibbat Zion and unlike Herzl, Ha'am saw Palestine as the spiritual centre of Jewish life. Ha'am inaugurated the movement in his 1880 essay "This is not the way", which called for the cultivation of a qualitative Jewish presence in the land over [the] quantitative one" pursued by Hibbat Zion. Ha'am was also a sharp critic of Herzl; spiritual Zionism believed that the realpolitik engaged in by Political Zionism corrupted Jewry, and opposed any political solutions that victimised non-Jewish people in the land.

Brit Shalom, which promoted Arab-Jewish cooperation, was established in 1925 by supporters of Ahad Ha'am's Spiritual Zionism, including Martin Buber, Gershom Scholem, Hans Kohn, "and other important figures of the intellectual elite of the pre-independence yishuv",

== Non-Jewish support ==
=== Christian support ===
Zionism has depended on support from Christians since its inception. Christian Zionism, also known as the Christian restorationist movement, has held the belief that the "return" of Jews to Palestine will result in the second coming of Jesus, universal resurrection of the dead, and the conversion of the Jews to Christianity. In this sense, according to Penslar, Christian ideas of "restoration" were a prerequisite for the success of Zionism.

Christian Zionism is primarily driven by the belief that the return of Jews to the Holy Land will either lead to their conversion to Christianity or their destruction. This belief is criticized by Gershom Gorenberg in his book "The End of Days," where he highlights the troubling aspect of this messianic scenario—the disappearance of Jews. Evangelical figures such as Jerry Falwell believe the establishment of Israel is a pivotal event signaling the Second Coming of Christ and the eventual End times. As a result, Christian Zionists have significantly contributed politically and financially to Israeli nationalist forces, with the understanding that Israel's role is to facilitate the Second Coming of Christ and the elimination of Judaism.

One of the principal Protestant teachers who promoted the biblical doctrine that the Jews would return to their national homeland was John Nelson Darby. His doctrine of dispensationalism is credited with promoting Zionism, following his 11 lectures on the hopes of the church, the Jew and the gentile given in Geneva in 1840. However, others like C H Spurgeon, both Horatius and Andrew Bonar, Robert Murray M'Chyene, and J C Ryle were among a number of prominent proponents of both the importance and significance of a Jewish return, who were not dispensationalist. Pro-Zionist views were embraced by many evangelicals and also affected international foreign policy.

The largest Zionist organisation is Christians United for Israel, which has 10 million members and is led by John Hagee.

=== Druze support ===
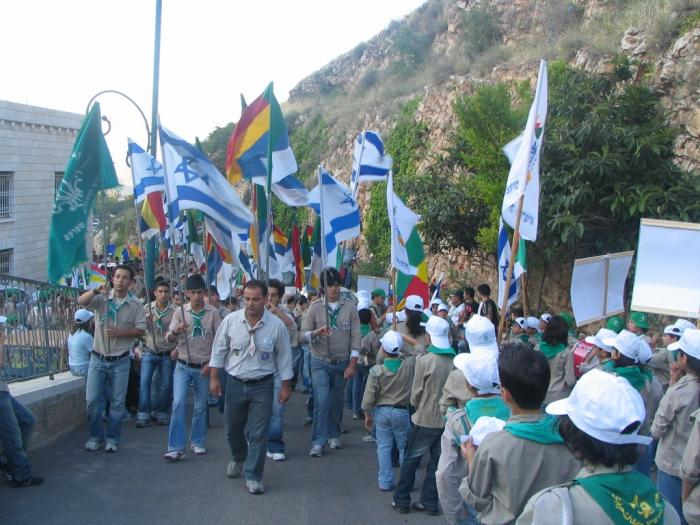
Israeli Druze Scouts march to Jethro's tomb. Today, thousands of Israeli Druze belong to 'Druze Zionist' movements.

While most Israeli Druze identify as ethnically Arab, today, tens of thousands of Israeli Druze belong to "Druze Zionist" movements. A survey conducted in 2008 by Dr. Yusuf Hassan of Tel Aviv University found that out of 764 Druze participants, more than 94% identify as "Druze-Israelis" in the religious and national context. In 1973, Amal Nasser el-Din founded the Zionist Druze Circle, a group whose aim was to encourage the Druze to support the state of Israel.

The Druze have aligned themselves more with the Zionist ethos and have distanced themselves from other Arab and Islamic nationalist causes in Israeli society. Israeli Druze citizens serve in the Israel Defense Forces. The Jewish-Druze partnership was often referred to as "a covenant of blood" (Hebrew: ברית דמים) in recognition of the shared responsibility of defending Israel.

=== Hindu support ===
Before and after Israel's creation in 1948, the Indian National Congress and the Indian government initially opposed Zionism.

Zionism, seen as a national liberation movement for the repatriation of the Jewish people to their homeland then under British colonial rule, appealed to many Hindu nationalists, who viewed their struggle for independence from British rule and the Partition of India as national liberation for long-oppressed Hindus. Jawaharlal Nehru, the first Prime Minister of India, drew a connection between the conflict in Palestine and Hindu-Muslim relations in India, calling it a British "imperialist diversion."

In more current times, conservative Indian parties and organizations tend to support Zionism. A 2012 international opinion survey found that India was the most pro-Israel country in the world. This has invited attacks on the Hindutva movement by parts of the Indian left opposed to Zionism, and allegations that Hindus are conspiring with the "Jewish Lobby."

== Anti-Zionism ==
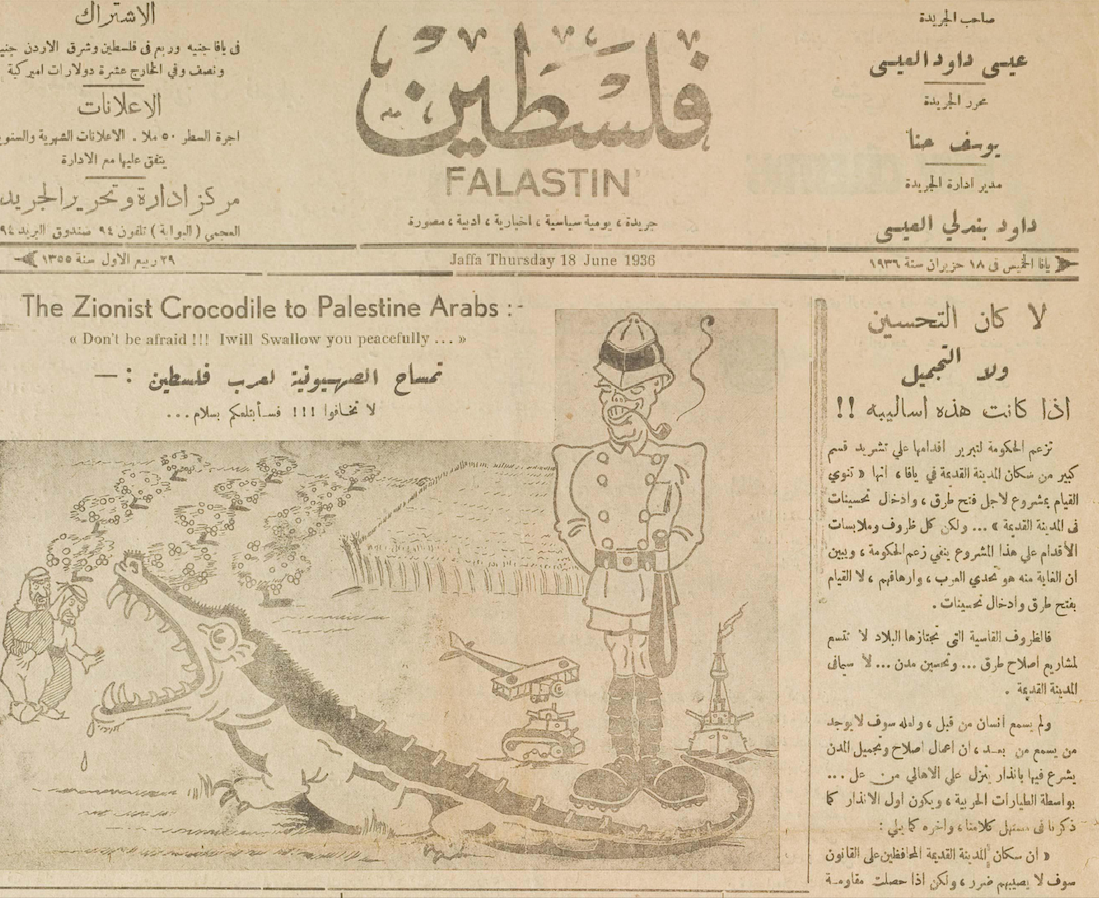
The Palestinian Arab Christian-owned Falastin newspaper featuring a caricature on its June 18, 1936, edition showing Zionism as a crocodile under the protection of a British officer with industrial military technology telling Palestinian fallāḥīn: "Don't be afraid!!! I will swallow you peacefully...".

Zionism has been criticized and opposed by a wide variety of organizations and individuals. Until World War II, anti-Zionism was widespread among Jews for varying reasons. Orthodox Jews opposed Zionism on religious grounds, as preempting the Messiah. (Note: "Though a little religious support for Zionism existed, 'the majority of Orthodox leaders condemned Zionism from its very outset,' particularly the rabbis of Eastern Europe. Their concerns were twofold: they feared that Zionists were overidealistic and were misleading the Jewish people about what was possible; they were also concerned that the Zionist millennial vision was an attempt to preempt the Messiah.") Many secular or assimilationist Jewish anti-Zionists identified more with ideals of the Enlightenment and saw Zionism as a reactionary ideology, while left-wing Jews (including in the Bund) believed that the Jewish question was best solved in the diaspora through building a socialist society.

Opposition to Zionism in the Jewish diaspora was surmounted only from the 1930s onward, as conditions for Jews deteriorated radically in Europe and, with the Second World War, the sheer scale of the Holocaust was felt. Thereafter, Jewish anti-Zionist groups generally either disintegrated or transformed into pro-Zionist organizations, though many small groups, and bodies like the American Council for Judaism, conserved an earlier Reform tradition of rejection of Zionism. There was a shift in the meaning of anti-Zionism after the events of the 1940s. Whereas pre-1948 anti-Zionism was against the hypothetical establishment of a Jewish state in Palestine, post-1948 anti-Zionism had to contend with the existence of the State of Israel. This often meant taking a retaliatory position to the new reality of Jewish sovereignty in the Middle East. The overriding impulse of post-1948 anti-Zionism is to dismantle the current State of Israel and replace it with something else.

Opposition to Zionism was overwhelmingly common among the non-Jewish communities of Palestine from the 1880s onwards. Palestinian nationalism, the national movement of the Palestinians that espouses self-determination and sovereignty over the region of Palestine, cohered in the early 20th century, along with broader Arab nationalism and the ideology of Greater Syria. Palestinian nationalism later internationalized and attached itself to other ideologies, in particular Third World socialism and Islamism, and was embodied in particular by the broadly secular Palestinian Liberation Organisation, and later also by the socialist Popular Front for the Liberation of Palestine and the Islamist Hamas.

Although the left was initially mostly supportive of Zionism, Soviet anti-Zionism was influential in spreading anti-Zionism on the global left, and much of the New Left of the 1960s took on anti-Zionism as a key tenet.

Today, opponents include Palestinian nationalists, several states of the Arab League and in the Muslim world, many on the political left, and some secular Jews (such as Jewish Voice for Peace and IfNotNow in the US), as well as the Satmar and Neturei Karta Jewish sects.

Many Jewish anti-Zionist groups operate both in Israel and the United States, most notably Jewish Voice for Peace, whose thousands of members opposes Israeli occupation of Palestinian territories. These groups outwardly reject an inherent union between Judaism and Zionism and, as a result, face animosity and marginalization from Zionist Jews in their community.

Fascists and the far-right have also generally espoused anti-Zionism, for antisemitic reasons.

Reasons for opposing Zionism have been varied, and they include: fundamental disagreement that foreign born Jews have rights of resettlement, the perception that land confiscations are unfair; expulsions of Palestinians; violence against Palestinians; and alleged racism and supremacism. Arab states in particular have historically strongly opposed Zionism. The preamble of the African Charter on Human and Peoples' Rights, which has been ratified by 53 African countries as of 2014, includes an undertaking to eliminate Zionism together with other practices including colonialism, neo-colonialism, apartheid, "aggressive foreign military bases" and all forms of discrimination.

=== Characterization as racist ===
In December 1973, the UN passed a series of resolutions condemning South Africa and included a reference to an "unholy alliance between Portuguese colonialism, Apartheid and Zionism." At the time there was little cooperation between Israel and South Africa, although the two countries developed a close relationship during the late 1970s. Parallels have also been drawn between aspects of South Africa's apartheid regime and certain Israeli policies toward the Palestinians, which are seen as manifestations of racism in Zionist thinking.

In 1975 the UN General Assembly passed Resolution 3379, which determined that "Zionism is a form of racism and racial discrimination". The resolution quotes from the 1963 Declaration on the Elimination of All Forms of Racial Discrimination, "any doctrine of racial differentiation or superiority is scientifically false, morally condemnable, socially unjust, and dangerous". The resolution named the occupied territory of Palestine, Zimbabwe, and South Africa as examples of racist regimes. Resolution 3379 was pioneered by the Soviet Union and passed with numerical support from Arab and African states amidst accusations that Israel was supportive of the apartheid regime in South Africa. In 1991 the resolution was repealed with UN General Assembly Resolution 46/86, after Israel declared that it would only participate in the Madrid Conference of 1991 if the resolution were revoked.

Arab countries sought to associate Zionism with racism in connection with a 2001 UN conference on racism in Durban, South Africa, which caused the United States and Israel to walk away from the conference. The final text of the conference did not connect Zionism with racism. A human rights forum arranged in connection with the conference, on the other hand, did equate Zionism with racism and censured Israel for what it called "racist crimes, including acts of genocide and ethnic cleansing".

=== Haredi Judaism and Zionism ===
Haredi Jews number some 2,100,000 world-wide, constituting 14% of the total Jewish population in the world. Most accept though do not support the secular Israeli state. A small number of Orthodox organizations among these Haredi reject Zionism as they view it as a secular movement and reject nationalism as a doctrine. In Jerusalem, certain Hasidic groups, most famously the Satmar Hasidim, as well as the larger movement they are part of, the Edah HaChareidis, are opposed to its ideology for religious reasons. Despite having his life saved by a leader of the Zionist movement in 1944, one of the best known Hasidic opponents of political Zionism was Hungarian rebbe and Talmudic scholar Joel Teitelbaum. Although this group of ultra-observant Jews do not support or identify with Zionism as a movement or ideology, in a poll taken in February 2024, 83% said they have a "very strong emotional connection" to Israel, only a small percentage less than the 87% of Modern Orthodox Jews who reported having those same feelings.

=== Anti-Zionism and antisemitism ===
Critics of anti-Zionism have argued that opposition to Zionism can be hard to distinguish from antisemitism, and that criticism of Israel may be used as an excuse to express viewpoints that might otherwise be considered antisemitic.

Anti-Zionist writers such as Norman Finkelstein, Noam Chomsky, Michael Marder, and Tariq Ali have argued that conflation of anti-Zionism and antisemitism obscures and stifles legitimate criticism of Israel's policies and actions. Anti-Zionist and post-Zionist writers have been attacked by Zionist thinkers.

== Zionism and colonialism ==
=== European colonialism ===
Zionism has been characterized as a form of colonialism or settler colonialism by various scholars. Joseph Massad argues that Zionism was intrinsically linked to European colonial thought from its inception, shaped by antisemitism and European imperial interests. Edward Said similarly described the movement as following the European colonial model, particularly in its patronizing view of the native Palestinian population, which it regarded as backward. Zeev Sternhell describes Zionism as a movement of "conquest", but disagrees that Jews arriving in Palestine had a colonial mindset. Anita Shapira and Shlomo Ben-Ami also emphasize the importance of the "ethos" of the movement, framing Zionism as a national liberation movement that was "destined" or "forced" to use colonial methods. (Note: Notably, Shapira also states that studying Zionism as a colonial movement is "both legitimate and desirable", though she notes that the reluctance to use these concepts is understandable, since they were associated with propaganda that vilified Zionism and Israel and presented them as enemies of the progressive, anti-colonial movement. She argues that the settler-colonial framing may help "clarify the relations between the settling nation and the native one", but adds that it needs to be complemented by what she refers to as perspective "from within" – the conceptual framework though which the Zionist movement viewed itself.) Conversely, Nur Masalha argues that Zionism cannot be understood as a national liberation movement because it relied on British colonial support, asserting that "the State of Israel owes its very existence to the British colonial power in Palestine".

Until the mid-20th century, Zionists used terminology related to 'colonization' when referring to immigration and settlement efforts in Palestine. Joseph Massad wrote that, for political and ideological reasons, starting in the 1930s, some Zionist thinkers proposed that the Zionist movement should avoid using terms related to colonialism. (Note: "In the 1930s, some Zionists were beginning to suggest a change in the ideological vocabulary of their colonial-settler project. FH. Kisch, the chairman of the Zionist Executive, noted in his diary in 1931 that he was 'striving to eliminate the word "colonization" in this connection [Jewish agricultural settlement in Palestine] from our phraseology. The word is not appropriate from our point of view since one does not set up colonies in a homeland but abroad: e.g. German colonies on the Volga or Jewish colonies in the Argentine, while from the point of view of Arab opinion the verb to "colonize" is associated with imperialism and aggressiveness'".) Rashid Khalidi describes this move as an attempted rebranding of Zionism as an anticolonial movement.

Benny Morris dismisses the charge that Zionism is a "classic nineteenth-century European colonial venture", due to the fact that it existed as a movement not to exploit the populace or resources, but to provide a safe haven for a native population experiencing oppression internationally.

=== The transition from British sponsored colonialism to the Israeli state ===
Sociologist Gershon Shafir describes the use of violence by a colonial metropole as essential to settler colonization. Shafir defines settler-colonialism as the creation of a permanent home in which settlers benefit from privileges withheld from the indigenous population. He describes colonization, the establishment of settlements against the wishes of the indigenous people, as the distinctive characteristic of settler colonialism.

Shafir distinguishes between the pre-1948 era and the post-1967 era in the sense that after 1967, the Israeli state became the sponsor of the Zionist movement's colonial efforts, a role that had previously been played by the British. For Shafir, political scientist Jerome Slater, and historian Shlomo Ben-Ami, after the Israeli conquest of the West Bank and Gaza Strip in 1967, the Zionist movement more closely resembled other colonial movements. Similarly, Avi Shlaim describes 1967 as a milestone in the development of the "Zionist colonial project" rather than as a qualitative shift in its nature. Israeli historian Yitzhak Sternberg cites Sivan, Halamish and Efrat as similarly describing 1967 as a turning point in which Zionism became involved in colonial efforts.

Shafir and Morris both further distinguish between Zionist colonialism during the First Aliyah and following the arrival of the Second Aliyah. Shafir describes the First Aliyah as following the ethnic plantation colony model, exploiting low wage Palestinian workers. Morris describes this relationship:

These Jews were not colonists in the usual sense of sons or agents of an imperial mother country, projecting its power beyond the seas and exploiting Third World natural resources. But the settlements of the First Aliyah were still colonial, with white Europeans living amid and employing a mass of relatively impoverished natives.

=== Colonization and colonialism ===
Ran Aaronsohn and Yitsakh Sternberg argues that it is important to clearly distinguish between colonization and colonialism as concepts. For Shafir and Peled, "colonization, namely territorial dispossession and the settlement of immigrant populations", cannot happen without colonialism and "the means of violence of a colonial metropole". In contrast, Sternberg considers classical definitions of colonization as broad enough to include cases that did not require the dispossession of the native population, and Aaronsohn argues that Jewish settlement in Palestine should be considered as "colonization without colonialism".

Tuvia Friling depicts the Zionist movement as operating differently from colonial movements in terms of land acquisition. Specifically, the Zionist movement acquired land in the early years by purchasing it. Sternberg in contrast explains that it was not unique for colonial movements to purchase land as part of land acquisition, pointing to similarities in North American colonialism. Friling argues that in contrast to European colonial projects, the early Zionist leadership was dominated by the labor movement with a socialist ethos. Shafir points to ideological drives in American and Rhodesian settler colonies that developed in service of the colonial project. Similarly, Shafir says, the Zionist labor movement used socialist ideals largely in service of the national movement.

In response to the argument that Zionism could not be a colonial project, but should instead be described as a project of immigration, Shafir quotes Lorenzo Veracini's statement that settlers sometimes hide "behind the persecuted, the migrant, even the refugee... behind his labor and hardship." Shafir goes on to characterize Zionism as not unique, in the sense that "[t]he ruthless ethnic cleanser is commonly hidden behind the peaceful settler who arrived in an 'empty land' to start a new life."

Alan Dowty describes the debate over the relationship between Zionism and colonialism as essentially a discussion of "semantics". He defines colonialism as the imposition of control by a "mother country" on another people, for economic gain or for the spreading of culture or religion. Dowty argues that Zionism does not fit this definition on the basis that "there was... no mother country" and that Zionism did not consider the local population in its plans. Efraim Karsh adopts a similar definition and similarly concludes that Zionism is not colonialism. Dowty elaborates that Zionism did not control the local population since it ultimately failed to remove the native people from Palestine. In his assessment of whether Zionism is colonialism, Penslar works with a broader definition of colonialism than Dowty, which allows for the country sponsoring the colonial enterprise to be different from the country of origin of the settlers.

=== Zionism as settler colonialism ===
Beyond characterizing it as a colonial movement, scholars have described Zionism as a case of settler colonialism, which is a form of colonialism in which settlers exercise colonial rule over a land and its indigenous peoples, transforming the land and replacing or assimilating its population with or into the society of the settlers.

The theoretical framework of settler colonialism, as well as its application to the case of Zionism and Palestine, emerged in the 1960s during the decolonization of Africa and the Middle East, and re-emerged in Israeli academia in the 1990s led by Israeli and Palestinian scholars surrounding the New Historians, who challenged some of Israel's foundational narratives. (Note: "The settler colonial paradigm, linked to Israeli critical sociology, post-Zionism, and postcolonialism, reemerged following changes in the political landscape from the mid-1990s that reframed the history of the Nakba as enduring, challenged the Jewish definition of the state, and legitimated Palestinians as agents of history. Palestinian scholars in Israel lead the paradigm's reformulation.Sabbagh-Khoury 2022, first section) It built on the work of Patrick Wolfe, an influential theorist of settler colonial studies who has defined settler colonialism as an ongoing "structure, not an event" aimed at replacing a native population rather than exploiting it.

The portrayal of Zionism as settler colonialism is strongly rejected by most Zionists and Israeli Jews, and is perceived either as an attack on the legitimacy of Israel, a form of antisemitism, or historically inaccurate. Some argue Zionism does not fit traditional colonial frameworks, viewing the Jews that migrated to Palestine as indigenous to it and therefore viewing Jewish migration to Palestine as an act of repatriation and the establishment of a Jewish state there as an act of national self-determination. Others cite the lack of a mother state and imperial direction.

== Palestinian views on Zionism ==
Palestinians including Rabea Eghbariah, Nadera Shalhoub-Kevorkian, Noura Erakat and Mohammed El-Kurd argue Zionism should be understood as inseparable from its political violence – the Nakba, the ethnic cleansing of Palestinians in and around 1948, and the ongoing conditions created by the Nakba, including instances of apartheid, occupation, and genocide. Joseph Massad, writing in Middle East Eye, sees Israel as a settler colony and the Gaza genocide as the latest chapter of settler colonialism.

== See also ==
- Back to Africa – Political movement in the United States during the 19th and 20th centuries
- Golus nationalism – Form of Jewish nationalism that takes pride in the diaspora over Zionism
- Hardal – Haredi portion of the religious Zionist Jewish community in Israel
- History of Zionism
- Israel lobby in the United States
- Israel lobby in the United Kingdom
- Jewish Autonomism – Non-Zionist Jewish political movement
- List of Zionists
- Palestinian nationalism – Movement for self-determination and sovereignty of Palestine
- Palestinianism – Pro-Palestinian sentiment
- Yehud Medinata – Province of the Achaemenid Empire
- Zionist as a pejorative
- Zionist political violence
