= Gliksberg =

Gliksberg is a surname. Notable people with the surname include:

- Chaim Gliksberg (1904–1970), Israeli painter
- Shimon Yaakov Gliksberg (1870–1950), Polish Rabbi
