= Shimon Yaakov Gliksberg =

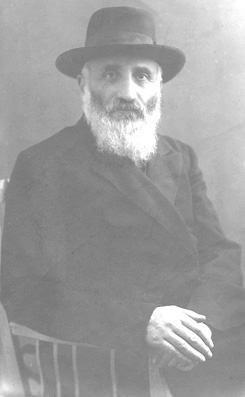

Rabbi Shimon Yaakov Halevi Gliksberg (Hebrew: שמעון יעקב גליקסברג; born in 1870 in Miedzyrzec Podlaski – died in 1950 in Tel-Aviv) was a scholar, preacher, historian and one of the founding members of the Mizrachi Zionist movement.

== Biography ==
Born to a Hassidic family, Rabbi Gliksberg studied in a yeshiva in Miedzyrzec Podlaski and later in the Tomchei Torah institution of Minsk, founded by The Great One of Minsk.

He was ordained as a rabbi by the esteemed Rabbi Yosef Hacohen Ravitz, the rabbi of Rastovich, by Rabbi Haim Yehuda of Smorgan and Rabbi Moshe Shaul Shapira of Bobruysk. For several years, he assisted his father-in-law, Rabbi Mordechai Dovid Alpert, the head of a rabbinical court in the district of Minsk who was known as "Yad Mordechai," the name of his most important book. In Minsk, Rabbi Gliksberg was one of the leaders of the Shlomei Emunei Zion group, which later became the Mizrachi movement. He was among the delegates to the movement's founding meeting in Vilna in the winter of 1902 representing his home town of Miedzyrzec Podlaski. He became a member of the Central Committee and was chosen together with Rabbi Ze'ev Yavetz to draft an organizational plan, to choose a name for the movement and to outline a platform for the new Zionist religious party. From that moment on, he continued to act as an advocate for the Mizrahi. When Rabbi Gliksberg came back to Miedzyrzec Podlaski to present his report on the conference, an audience of thousands assembled to hear him in the large Beis Midrash, where he had studied as a youth.

Rabbi Gliksberg accepted a position of a rabbi in Pinsk in 1902. He was a delegate to the Russian Zionist Conference in Minsk and to the Sixth Zionist Congress in Basel in 1903. After the death of Theodor Herzl he traveled to various large cities as a representative of Mizrahi to eulogize the visionary of the Jewish state.

In 1906 Rabbi Gliksberg became a rabbi in Odessa. He devoted himself more than ever to Zionist activities and became the chair of the Mizrahi movement. He was also an active member of the Hovevei Zion organization. He was renowned for his extensive knowledge of Judaism and Jewish literature, and for being a well respected interpreter and preacher. His sermons at the city's main synagogue and at the Zionist synagogue Yavneh drew crowds of young men .

In addition to his official duties as a rabbi he was active in the domains of education and social work. He was one of the founders of the Shomrei Torah yeshiva, and his efforts led to the establishment of public schools for impoverished Jewish children in affiliation with various synagogues. He was also a founder of the Ezrat Holim charitable organization. He published a pamphlet in Yiddish and Russian called Ezrat Holim about concepts of charity and about support for ailing members of the community. The pamphlet was distributed in thousands of copies.

In 1917 Rabbi Gliksberg was a delegate to the National Congress of Ukrainian Jews. That same year he became a member of the Odessa City Council and was officially appointed as the city's chief rabbi. He continued to serve as Odessa's chief rabbi until 1937.

In the 1920s Rabbi Gliksberg came to prominence in the course of seven “religious debates” with Anatoly Lunacharsky, members of Yevsektsiya, Russian religious leaders such as Alexander Vvedensky and others. The debates took place in stadiums and theaters of Odessa with thousands of people present. During one of the debates Anatoli Lunacharsky, the Commissar of Culture and Education, said, "My faith in collective redemption gives me such power in the future as cannot be given by any religion." Rabbi Gliksberg replied, "The faith you have is precisely of the religious kind." During the debates Rabbi Gliksberg impressed the crowds with his erect posture, rhetorical talent, religious enthusiasm and apt remarks, as well as with his wide-ranging knowledge of philosophy, science and literature. Indeed, his power of conviction made him into what one of his opponents called a "dangerous debater."

In 1937 Rabbi Gliksberg moved to Eretz Israel where he was the head of the Rabbinical court of Tel Aviv. A great scholar and virtuous man, pure in spirit and thought, he ruled the religious court in a moderate, considerate, and pleasant manner. He was also a member of the Mizrahi's court of honoraries. For several years he served as one of the judges who awarded the Rabbi Kook Prize.

After Rabbi Gliksberg's death a street in Tel-Aviv was named after him and his son, artist Chaim Gliksberg.

== Personal life ==
Rabbi Gliksberg married Cypa Mejta Alpert, daughter of Rabbi Mordechai Dovid Alpert, A.B.D. Svisloch, who was a grandson of Aryeh Leib Epstein (Ba'al ha-Pardes) of Königsberg. They had 7 children, 4 daughters and 3 sons. His son Chaim Gliksberg moved to Eretz Israel in 1925 and became a renowned artist and author. The rest of Rabbi Gliksberg's children lived in the Soviet Union until the day they died. The oldest daughter Eneta became a teacher and taught at Yevrabmol experimental school in Odessa. Daughter Eugenia became a well-known physician and medical researcher who published an impressive volume of work and received a Doctoral degree based on those publications. She served in the medical corps during World War II becoming a Major of Medical Corps and earning two Orders of the Red Star for bravery. Daughter Judith became a prominent child care specialist and daughter Sulamith was an infectious disease specialist. Rabbi's son Shmuel died when he was 7 years old from scarlet fever. The youngest son Benjamin, an engineer educated in Strelitz, Germany, was arrested in 1936 and spent 20 years of his life in Joseph Stalin's camps. Later, after Stalin's death he was still not allowed to live in Odessa with his family.

== Works ==
- Ha-Derashah be-Yisrael (a history of Jewish preaching), Be-Suye Mosad Ha-Rav Kuk Tel Aviv 1940
- Musage ha-Hayyim, Be-Suye Mosad Ha-Rav Kuk Tel Aviv 1945
- There are several unpublished manuscripts held in an archive in Jerusalem
