= Chaim Gliksberg =

Israeli painter (1904–1970)

- חיים גליקסברג
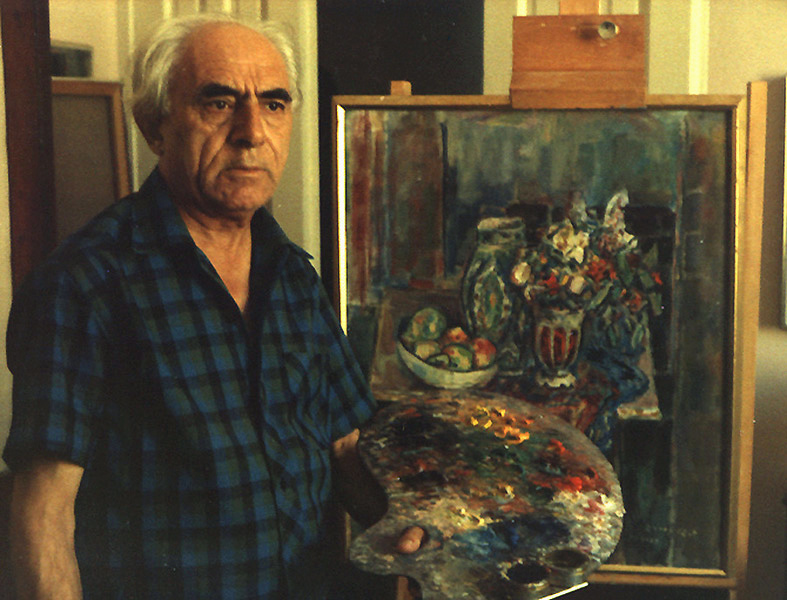
- Gliksberg at his studio in Tel Aviv in 1966
- Born: 1904; Pinsk, Russian Empire
- Died: 1970 (aged 65–66); Tel Aviv, Israel
- Occupation: Painter
- Known for: Portraits, including several of Hayyim Nahman Bialik
- Awards: Dizengoff Prize (1936, 1937, 1956)

Chaim Gliksberg (Hebrew: חיים גליקסברג; 1904–1970) was an Israeli painter who lived and worked in Tel Aviv.

== Early life and studies ==
Chaim Gliksberg was born in Pinsk, then in the Russian Empire, to Rabbi Shimon Yaakov Gliksberg and Cypa Mejta, daughter of Rabbi Mordechai Dovid Alpert. When he was 2 years old his family moved to Odessa. He attended cheder and the Odessa yeshiva where he met the future painter Isaac Frenkel.

In 1918 he attended the Bershadsky School of Art in Odessa. From 1920 to 1924 he studied in the city's Art Academy under Professor Dvornikov and academician Costandi, names well known in the Russian arts’ world.

== Life and work in Israel ==
Arriving in Eretz Israel in 1925 he went straight to Jerusalem. He worked in Bezalel and later in road paving. Despite living hardships he painted a great deal. In 1927 his first exhibit went on display at the Lämel School (often misspelled 'Lemel School'), under the auspices of the Hebrew Artists Association in Eretz Israel. In 1929 the artist moved to Tel Aviv where he taught and maintained a studio. In 1930 he held a one-man show in Ohel Shem, which Hayyim Nahman Bialik opened with an enthusiastic speech.

Gliksberg was a noted portrait painter and artist, as well as a writer and music enthusiast. Writers and artists such as Hayyim Nahman Bialik, Alter Druyanov and Gershon Shofman admired him and held him in high regard. Bialik sat for Gliksberg more often than for any other painter, and the seven portraits Gliksberg made of him, showing the poet in different seasons and dress, are considered among the leading portraits of Israel’s national poet. Gliksberg’s notes of his conversations with Bialik during these sittings were later published as the book Bialik Day to Day, which is regarded as one of the most reliable records of Bialik’s spoken words, avoiding exaggeration and presenting him as he was.

When a dream of a full-scale municipal museum in Tel Aviv began to take shape Gliksberg was invited to serve on the Museum Committee representing painters and sculptors. In 1934 Gliksberg was among the founders of the Painters and Sculptors Association.

== Awards and legacy ==
He was awarded the Dizengoff Prize in 1936, 1937 and 1956. His paintings can be found in museums, public and private collections throughout the world. After his death a street in Tel Aviv was named after him.

== Writing ==
A memoir, Treasured in the Heart was published after his death.
Chaim Gliksberg Bialik Yom-Yom, Hotsaat Ha-Kibuts Ha-Meuhad, 1948 Tel Aviv
