= Sixth Zionist Congress =

World Zionist Congress

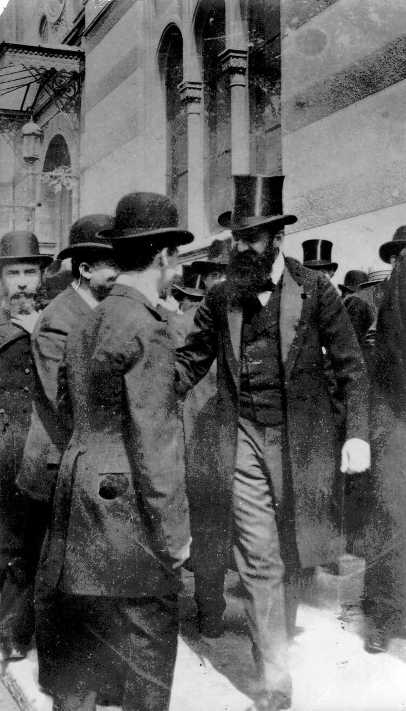
Herzl outside Basel synagogue on eve of first session

The Sixth Zionist Congress was held in Basel, opening on August 23, 1903. Theodor Herzl caused great division amongst the delegates when he presented the "Uganda Scheme", a proposed Jewish colony in what is now part of Kenya.

== Background ==
Following the success of Der Judenstaat, published in 1896, and the First Zionist Congress the following year, Theodor Herzl had become the undisputed leader of the Zionist movement. He envisioned a mass migration of Jewish people "on a very large scale" to Palestine and that the colony should be "secured by public law". For the next seven years, Herzl devoted himself to achieving this vision. His first approach was an attempt to gain Ottoman backing. He lobbied Sultan Abdul Hamid II with proposals for Jewish financial assistance. In 1898 he contrived to have an interview with the Kaiser. He approached British politicians with proposals for colonies in Cyprus and al Arish. By 1903 none of these approaches had produced any results. In April of that year, the Jewish population of Kishinev was subjected to a 3-day pogrom fuelled by blood libel accusations. Initial Yiddish reports gave the number of dead as 120, though the final toll was much lower. In August Herzl, without consulting the Zionist leadership in the Pale of Settlement, journeyed to Saint Petersburg, where he had two meetings with Vyacheslav von Plehve, Czarist Minister of the Interior, regarded by many as responsible for the Kishinev atrocities. Von Plehve responded positively to the idea of mass emigration of Jews "without right of re-entry" but wanted help in suppressing Jewish revolutionary activity. Herzl's meetings resulted in an official letter in which the Tzar's Government agreed to press the Sultan for a Charter allowing Zionists to colonize Palestine, agreed to finance Jewish immigration through a tax on wealthy Jews, and allow Zionist societies to function within the Tzarist Empire. At the same time, nine days before the Congress, on his journey from St Petersburgh to Basel, Herzl received official confirmation of the British Government's endorsement of a proposal for a Jewish self-governing colony in East Africa. It would have the capacity for 1 million settlers - the Uganda Scheme.

== The Greater Actions Committee ==
The Greater Actions Committee met on Friday August 21, the day before the Congress's opening ceremonies. Members of the committee were pledged to secrecy. Many were shocked at the deterioration of Herzl's health. The meeting began with Herzl's report on his meetings with von Plehve which had already generated opposition and criticism from Russian Zionists. His critics in the committee doubted von Plehve's promises of support and argued that the content of letter should not be revealed to the Congress. Herzl refused. This discussion was followed by Herzl's announcement of the British proposal for a Jewish colony in Africa. Herzl did not expect the degree of opposition the proposal generated, particularly from members from the Pale and Odessa. One of his aides, Alex Marmorek, called it a "death blow to Zionism." The committee met again the following evening and, against strong opposition, Herzl had the Uganda Scheme made the centre piece of the Congress proceedings. Herzl's diary entry for August 22 ended: "Not a single moment did it occur to any of them that of these greatest of all accomplishments to date I deserve a word of thanks, or even a smile. Instead Messrs.... criticised me."

== The Congress ==
Herzl's opening address presented the 592 delegates with the news of the Tsarist promises and the British proposals for a self-governing colony. “Let us save those who can be saved. [...] I do not doubt that the Congress will welcome the new offer with the warmest gratitude.” Despite receiving “tumultuous” applause there was serious opposition to the Uganda Scheme, particularly from the 113 delegates from the Tzarist Empire. Max Nordau opened the following session tasked with defending acceptance of the British offer. He argued that the colony should be seen a “shelter in the night” or an “overnight shelter” - Nachtasyl - a stepping stone on the way to Palestine. Debate was constrained by the presence of Tzarist and Ottoman spies. With the probability of rejection of any motion accepting the Uganda Scheme a proposal was presented to the delegates to send a fact finding mission to Africa. It passed with 295 in favour, 178 against, but with about 100 abstentions. The vote was followed by extraordinary scenes: the Russian members of the Action Committee left the podium. The majority of the Russian delegates followed them out of the hall. That evening Herzl spent several hours speaking to the protesters. Despite a hostile reception he managed to persuade them to return for the remaining sessions. Underlining the strength of the opposition Congress passed a motion that no Zionist funds should be provided for the investigating committee.

Amongst those supporting the Uganda Scheme was Israel Zangwill who feared a colony in Palestine would lead to an Orthodox revival “precluding modernity”. “We could not [...] lead a modern life there.” Another supporter was Eliezer Ben-Yehuda who was one of the few delegates with actual experience of living in Palestine. Paradoxically both the reformist Hamizrachi and the ultra orthodox Mizrachi delegates tended to support the plan. Chaim Weizmann, one of the most outspoken of the new generation of Zionists, gave a “violent speech” against, whereas his father and brother, who were also delegates, were in favour. Martin Buber was one of the minority of Western European Jews who vote against. Nachman Syrkin gave a speech criticising Herzl. The delegate from Kishnev as well as the entire Russian leadership voted against. The artist Ephraim Moses Lilien and 23 year old Vladimir Jabotinsky were also against.

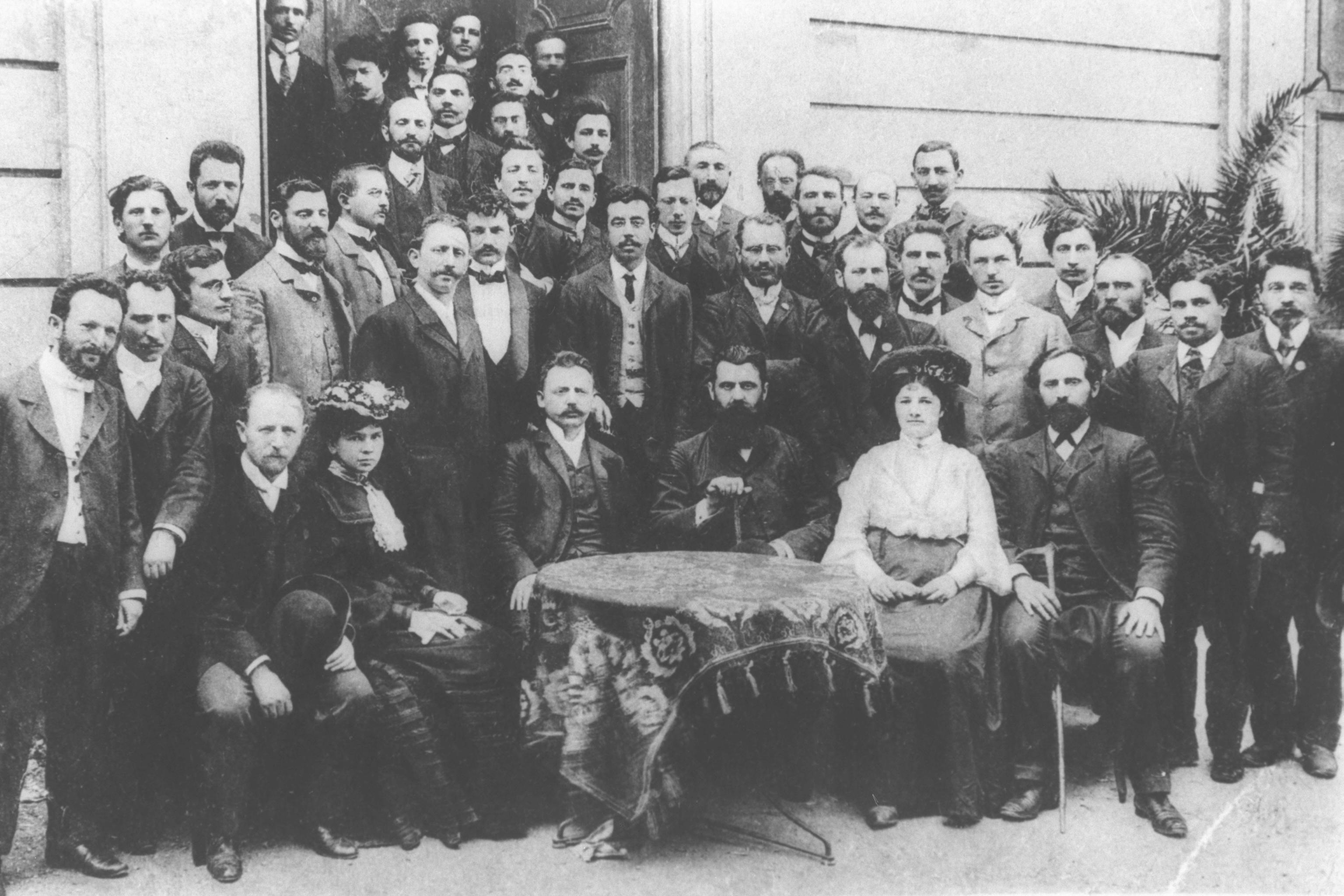
Herzl with journalists attending the 6th Congress

Leon Trotsky, also 23 years old, attended in the press gallery reporting for Iskra, the Russian Socialist underground newspaper. He predicted the imminent collapse of Zionism.

== Aftermath ==
On 31 August, just as the Congress closed, the Ottoman ambassador to Berlin telegrammed his superiors stating that the Zionists objective was to form an independent state in Palestine and that special laws should be brought in prohibiting the purchase of land by Zionists.

In December, three months after the Congress, a 24-year-old Russian student attempted to assassinate Nordau at a Parisian Hanukkah celebration. The attacker shouted “Death to the East African” as he fired his gun.

In Britain opposition to the Uganda Scheme from politicians was growing and by March 1904 the proposal was put on hold.

In April 1904 an opposition meeting in Vienna was organised by one of the leading Russian Zionists Menachem Ussishkin. He had not attended the Sixth Congress and was not a Herzl supporter. At the meeting Herzl acknowledged that the plans for colonies in Africa were over.

Zangwill split from the Zionists and set up the Jewish Territorial Organization.

Herzl died 3 July 1904.

== Other delegates and attendees ==
- David Baazov
- Meir Dizengoff
- Herbert Friedenwald
- Shimon Yaakov Gliksberg
- Chaim Hirschensohn
- Yehudah Leib Levin
- Hermann Maas
- Nathan Mileikowsky
- Nahum Nir
- Mordechai Nurock
- Gedaliah Silverstone
- Selig Soskin
