= Yehudah Leib Levin =

Hebrew poet

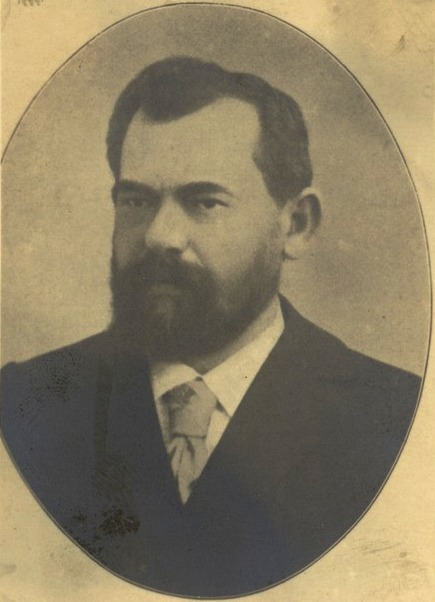
- Born: 1844; Minsk, Russian Empire
- Died: November 30, 1925 (aged 80–81); Kiev, Soviet Ukraine
- Writing career
- Pen name: Yehalel (יְהַלֵּ״ל); Yehalal (יְהָלַ״ל)
- Language: Hebrew

Yehudah Leib ha-Levi Levin (Hebrew: יְהוּדָה לֵיִבּ הַלֵּוִי לֵוִין; 1844 – 30 November 1925), also known by the acronyms Yehalel and Yehalal, was a Hebrew socialist maskilic Hebrew poet, writer, and publicist. His poems were the first to introduce socialist themes into Hebrew literature.

== Biography ==
=== Early life and career ===
Yehudah Leib Levin was born in Minsk, Belarus to a well-established Ḥasidic family. His father, Rabbi Baruch Chaim Levin, was a well-to-do merchant and scholar with a close relationship to Rabbi Shlomo Chaim Perlov of Koidanov, and his mother Miriam was the daughter of Ḥasidic rebbe Moshe of Kobrin. Levin married at the age of 17 and went to live with his father-in-law in the shtetl of Puchowitz, where he discovered the Chabad movement and diligently studied its doctrine and literature.

He is known as the author of epic poem in three parts, also concerning the social condition of the Russian Jews.

=== Zionism ===
As a reaction to the 1881 pogroms, Levin began to draw away from the socialist circles. He initially advocated for emigration to the United States; in an October 1881 letter to the Hebrew weekly Ha-Magid, he wrote:

"In the Holy Land our dream would be far from realized; there we would be slaves to the Sultan and the pashas. […] But in America our dream is closer to fulfillment, for the constitution of that country provides that when the number of colonists reaches sixty thousand they have the right to establish a separate state […] and our hope of attaining our independence and leading our lives in accordance with our beliefs and inclinations would not be long deferred."

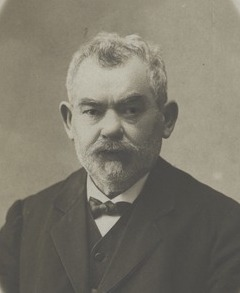
Levin in 1909

Nonetheless, Levin shortly thereafter joined the Ḥovevei Zion movement in Kiev and became an active supporter of emigration to Palestine. He publicly expressed agreement with Leon Pinsker's Auto-Emancipation, and in 1884 translated into Hebrew Benjamin Disraeli's novel Tancred, which visualizes the return of the Jews to their land.

Levin was forced to leave Kiev in 1887 because of his Zionist activities. He settled in the small town of Tomashpil where, while continuing his literary work, he worked at a sugar factory owned by the Brodsky family. In 1890, he completed the poem "Daniyel be-gov ha-arayot" ('Daniel in the Lions’ Den'), highlighting the struggle against anti-Semitism and Levin's outspoken support of Zionism; the poem was not published until 1898 because of censorship. At the Sixth Zionist Congress in 1903, he was among the "Territorialists" who supported the plan to provide temporary refuge in British East Africa for European Jews facing anti-Semitism.

=== Later life ===
Levin returned to Kiev after the Soviet regime closed the Brodsky sugar factory following the Russian Revolution in 1918. His later years were marked by poverty in his daughter's home and persecution by the Yevsektsiya. He attended clandestine Zionist meetings in the city until he died on 30 November 1925. A selection of his memoirs, articles, and poems was published in 1968 as Zikhronot ve-Hegyonot ('Memoirs and Essays').
