= Yevrabmol =

Trade school in Odessa, 1921–1937

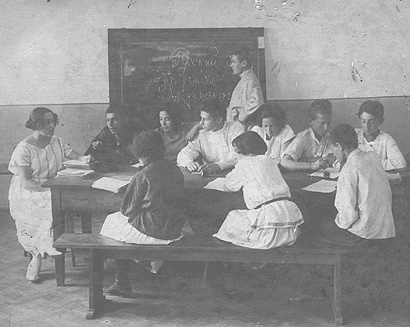
Russian Literature class at Yevrabmol taught by Eneta S. Gliksberg (far left)

Yevrabmol (a Russian acronym for "Jewish Working Youth, sometimes spelled Evrabmol) was an experimental trade school that operated in Odessa (now in Ukraine) from 1921 to 1937. Its official title was the First Clubhouse of Working Jewish Youth.

The school was a communal technical school that became a home for children and youths who were orphaned during the turbulent times of World War I, pogroms, the Russian revolution and the Russian Civil War. The children were not only educated and given a home but were also taught a trade. The school owned some land in the outskirts of Odessa and a factory. The students worked on the land and in the factory to produce marketable products to make the school financially self-sufficient. The students and most of the teachers lived, studied and worked in two large buildings in the middle of downtown Odessa.

Moisei B. Bernstein was the founder and first director of the school. The school principals were impressed by the then new Dalton Plan and implemented it, adjusting it to their learning environment. The students were taught languages, history, Jewish history, geography, mathematics and a variety of other subjects. Some of the teachers who played a major role in the school's development were Eneta S. Gliksberg who taught Russian language and literature and Yakov M. Plikh who taught languages and history.
