= Mordechai Dovid Alpert =

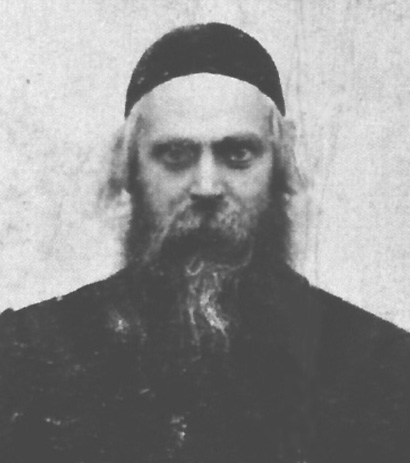

Mordechai Dovid Alpert (Hebrew: מרדכי דוד אלפרט; 1850 in Slonim – 1918 in Svislovich, near Bobruysk) was born into the family of Rabbi Chaim Shabtai Alpert known as "Chaim Matmid" and who was a great-great-grandson of Aryeh Leib Epstein (Ba'al ha-Pardes) of Königsberg.

Alpert served as a rabbi in Orlya in 1877 and Mordy in 1880s. In 1890 he became a rabbi in Svisloch near Bobruysk and was the head of a rabbinical court in the district of Minsk. He soon abandoned his rabbinic duties in order to concentrate on Talmud research and his writings. His published works included sefers (books) Yad Morcechai, Binyan Dovid, Divrei Dodim and Chemed Mordechai. He became known in the rabbinical world as "Yad Mordechai" after the sefer he had published. He left some unpublished manuscripts that now reside in Hebrew University in Jerusalem and The Rambam Library in Tel-Aviv. Rabbi Alpert died during World War I while Germans occupied Svisloch.
