= History of Zionism (pre-1948) =

Zionism, as an organised nationalist movement, is generally considered to have been founded by Theodor Herzl in 1897, the year of the First Zionist Congress of the Zionist Organization. Earlier movements in the 19th century, described as Proto-Zionism or Forerunners of Zionism, included Hovevei Zion (lit. 'Lovers of Zion'), responsible for the creation of 20 Jewish towns in Palestine between 1870 and 1897.

At the core of the Zionist ideology was the aspiration for a Jewish national home through the re-establishment of Jewish sovereignty in Palestine, to be facilitated by the Jewish diaspora (see aliyah). Herzl sought an independent Jewish state (usually defined as a secular state with a Jewish-majority population, in contrast to a theocratic Halakhic state), as expressed in his 1896 pamphlet Der Judenstaat. Though he did not live to witness it, his vision was fulfilled with the founding in 1948 of the State of Israel within the former territory of Mandatory Palestine.

== Background ==
=== Jewish nationalism and emancipation ===
From the point of view of Modern Jewish historiography, Zionism arose as one of various proposed approaches to what was often called the "Jewish problem" in late 19th century Europe: an apparent inability to eliminate antisemitism and to ensure acceptance, integration, and equal rights for the Jews of Europe, who had frequently been subjected to segregation, discrimination, and persecution under Christian rule in the medieval and early modern periods.

In the 19th century, too, the idea of nationalism spread widely in Europe and beyond that nations, generally distinguished by a unique language, were the essential units into which humans were naturally divided. Throughout the century, this idea shaped the struggles of various peoples in overthrowing what they saw as foreign—and therefore illegitimate—rule in order to establish and unify independent nation states. According to Zachary Lockman, nationalisms in Europe "often raised the question of whether their indigenous Jewish minorities would be accepted as part of the new 'national family'."

The Prussian historian Heinrich Graetz (1817-1891), in his 11-volume Geschichte der Juden (History of the Jews), highlighted an emerging Jewish national identity.

Ideas of Jewish cultural unity developed a specifically political expression in the 1860s as Jewish intellectuals began promoting the idea of Jewish nationalism. This emerged amid the rise of nationalism in 19th century Europe.

In 1880, there were 8 million Jews in the world, 90% of whom lived in Europe. Of these, three quarters lived in Eastern Europe, and the vast majority of them lived in the territories of the Russian Empire, under Tsarist rule. Eastern European Jews did not benefit from the process of secularization and the project of Jewish emancipation that followed the French Revolution in Western Europe; most Jews living under Russian rule suffered from poverty and antisemitism, forced to live in the Pale of Settlement and subjected to waves of pogroms.

Zionism emerged towards the end of the "best century" for Jews who for the first time were allowed as equals into European society and gained access to schools, universities, and professions that were previously closed to them. By the 1870s, Jews had achieved almost complete civic emancipation in all the states of western and central Europe. By 1914, Jews had moved from the margins to the forefront of European society. In the urban centers of Europe and America, Jews played an influential role in professional and intellectual life. During this period, as Jewish assimilation was still progressing most promisingly, some Jewish intellectuals and religious traditionalists framed assimilation as a humiliating negation of Jewish cultural distinctiveness. The development of Zionism and other Jewish nationalist movements grew out of these sentiments. In this sense, Zionism can be read as a response to the Haskala and the challenges of modernity and liberalism, rather than purely a response to antisemitism.

Emancipation in Eastern Europe progressed more slowly, to the point that Deickoff writes "social conditions were such that they made the idea of individual assimilation pointless". Antisemitism, pogroms and official policies in Tsarist Russia led to the emigration of three million Jews in the years between 1882 and 1914, only 1% of which went to Palestine. Those who went to Palestine were driven primarily by ideas of self-determination and Jewish identity, rather than just in response to pogroms or economic insecurity. Zionism's emergence in the late 19th century was among assimilated Central European Jews who, despite their formal emancipation, still felt excluded from high society. Many of these Jews had moved away from traditional religious observances and were largely secular, mirroring a broader trend of secularisation in Europe. Despite their efforts to integrate, the Jews of Central and Eastern Europe were frustrated by continued lack of acceptance by the local national movements that tended toward intolerance and exclusivity. For the early Zionists, if nationalism posed a challenge to European Jewry, it also proposed a solution.

=== Biblical precedents ===
The concept of the "return" was a powerful symbol within religious Jewish belief, traditionally emphasizing that their return should be determined by Divine Providence rather than human action. This 'return to Zion' is commemorated particularly at prayers at the end of Passover and Yom Kippur by the phrasing "next year in Jerusalem".

The theme of return to is also present in the Babylonian exile, after the Babylonians conquered the Kingdom of Judah in 587 BCE and the Judeans were exiled to Babylon. In the book of Psalms (Psalm 137), Jews lamented their exile while prophets like Ezekiel foresaw their return. The Bible recounts how, in 538 BCE Cyrus the Great of Persia conquered Babylon and issued a proclamation granting the people of Judah their freedom. 50,000 Judeans, led by Zerubbabel returned. A second group of 5,000, led by Ezra and Nehemiah, returned to Judea in 456 BCE.

=== Precursors ===
The 613 Jewish revolt against Heraclius is considered the last serious Jewish attempt to gain autonomy in Palestine in antiquity. In 1160 David Alroy led a Jewish uprising in Upper Mesopotamia that aimed to reconquer the promised land. The Jewish expulsion from Spain led to some Jewish refugees fleeing to Ottoman Palestine. In 1564, Joseph Nasi, with the support of the sultan of the Ottoman Empire, attempted to create a Jewish province in the Galilee, but he died in 1579 before his plans could be completed. However, the community in Safed continued as did small-scale aliyah into the 17th century.

In 1648 Sabbatai Zevi (1626–1676) announced himself as the Messiah and gained many Jews to his side, forming a base in Salonika. He first tried to establish a settlement in Gaza, but moved later to Smyrna. After deposing the old rabbi Aaron Lapapa in the spring of 1666, the Jewish community of Avignon, France, prepared to emigrate to the new kingdom.

=== Aliyah and the "Ingathering of the Exiles" ===
The cultural memory of Jews in the diaspora revered the Land of Israel. Religious tradition held that a future messianic age would usher in their return as a people. The biblical prophecy of Kibbutz Galuyot, the ingathering of exiles in the Land of Israel as foretold by the Prophets, became a central idea in Zionism.

Aliyah (return to Israel) has always been considered a praiseworthy act for Jews according to Jewish law and some Rabbis consider it one of the core 613 commandments in Judaism. From the Middle Ages and onwards, some famous rabbis (and often their followers) made aliyah to the Land of Israel. These included Nahmanides, Yechiel of Paris with several hundred of his students, Joseph ben Ephraim Karo, Menachem Mendel of Vitebsk and 300 of his followers, and over 500 disciples (and their families) of the Vilna Gaon known as Perushim, among others.

=== Europe's age of enlightenment and the Jews ===
The Age of Enlightenment in Europe led to an 18th- and 19th-century Jewish enlightenment movement in Europe, called the Haskalah. In 1791, the French Revolution led France to become the first country in Europe to grant Jews legal equality. Britain gave Jews equal rights in 1856, Germany in 1871. The spread of western liberal ideas among newly emancipated Jews created for the first time a class of secular Jews who absorbed the prevailing ideas of enlightenment, including rationalism, romanticism, and nationalism.

However, the formation of modern nations in Europe accompanied changes in the prejudices against Jews. What had previously been religious persecution now became a new phenomenon of racial antisemitism and acquired a new name: antisemitism. Antisemites saw Jews as an alien religious, national and racial group and actively tried to prevent Jews from acquiring equal rights and citizenship. The Catholic press was at the forefront of these efforts and was quietly encouraged by the Vatican, which saw its own decline in status as linked to the equality granted to Jews. By the late 19th century, the more extreme nationalist movements in Europe often promoted physical violence against Jews who they regarded as interlopers and exploiters threatening the well-being of their nations.

The transformation of the religious, and primarily passive connection between Jews and Palestine, into an active, secular, nationalist movement arose within the context of ideological developments within modern European nations in the 19th century. According to Gideon Shimoni, the religious Judaic notion of being a nation was distinct from the modern European notion of nationalism.

== Forerunners ==
=== Proto-Zionism ===
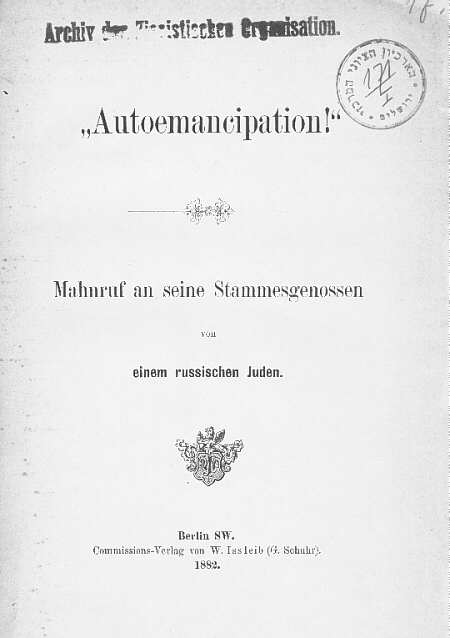
Auto-Emancipation by J. L. Pinsker, 1882

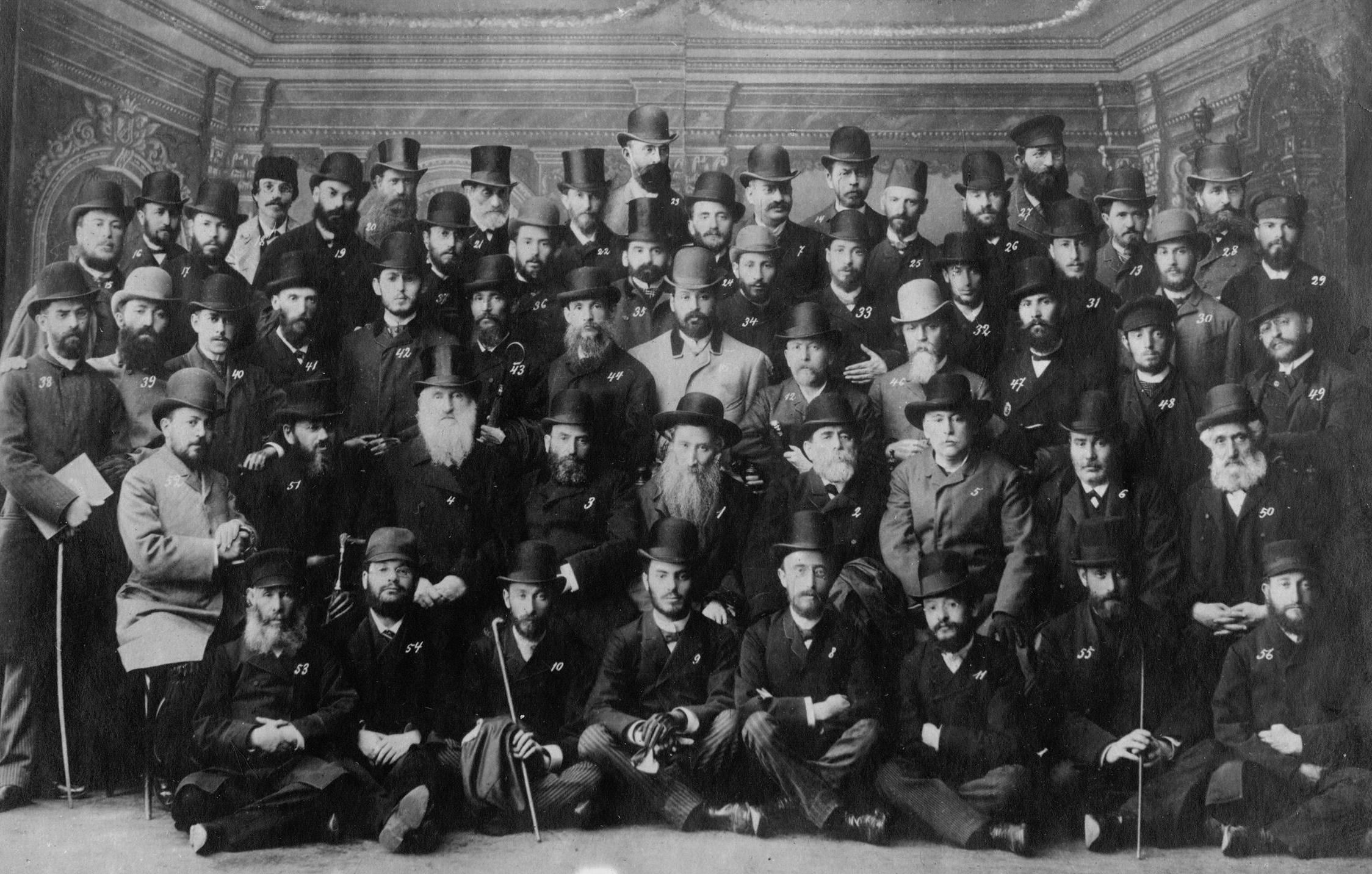
The first general assembly of the Society for the Support of Jewish Farmers and Artisans in Syria and Palestine, also known as the Odessa Committee, 1890

The forerunners of Zionism, rather than being causally connected to the later development of Zionism, are thinkers and activists who expressed some notion of Jewish national consciousness or advocated for the migration of Jews to Palestine. These attempts were not continuous as national movements typically are. The most notable proto-Zionists were rabbis such as Judah Alkalai and Zvi Hirsch Kalischer. Their idea of Jews as a collective was strongly tied to religious notions distinct from the secular movement referred to as Zionism that developed at the end of the century.

The idea of returning to Palestine was rejected by the conferences of rabbis held in that epoch. Individual efforts supported the emigration of groups of Jews to Palestine, pre-Zionist Aliyah, even before the First Zionist Congress in 1897, the year considered as the start of practical Zionism. Moses Montefiore, who is viewed as a proto-Zionist, established a colony for Jews in Palestine. In 1854, his friend Judah Touro bequeathed money to fund Jewish residential settlement in Palestine.

Moses Hess, a former associate of Karl Marx and Friedrich Engels, is regarded as the first modern Jewish nationalist, advocated for the establishment of an independent Jewish state in pursuit of the economic and social normalization of the Jewish people. Hess believed that emancipation alone was not a sufficient solution to the problems faced by European Jewry. In 1862, he wrote Rome and Jerusalem. The Last National Question calling for the Jews to create a socialist state in Palestine as a means of settling the Jewish question. Also in 1862, German Orthodox Rabbi Kalischer published his tractate Derishat Zion, arguing that the salvation of the Jews, promised by the Prophets, can come about only by self-help. In 1882, after the Odessa pogrom, Judah Leib Pinsker published the pamphlet Auto-Emancipation (self-emancipation), arguing that Jews could only be truly free in their own country and analysing the persistent tendency of Europeans to regard Jews as aliens.

=== Christian Zionism ===
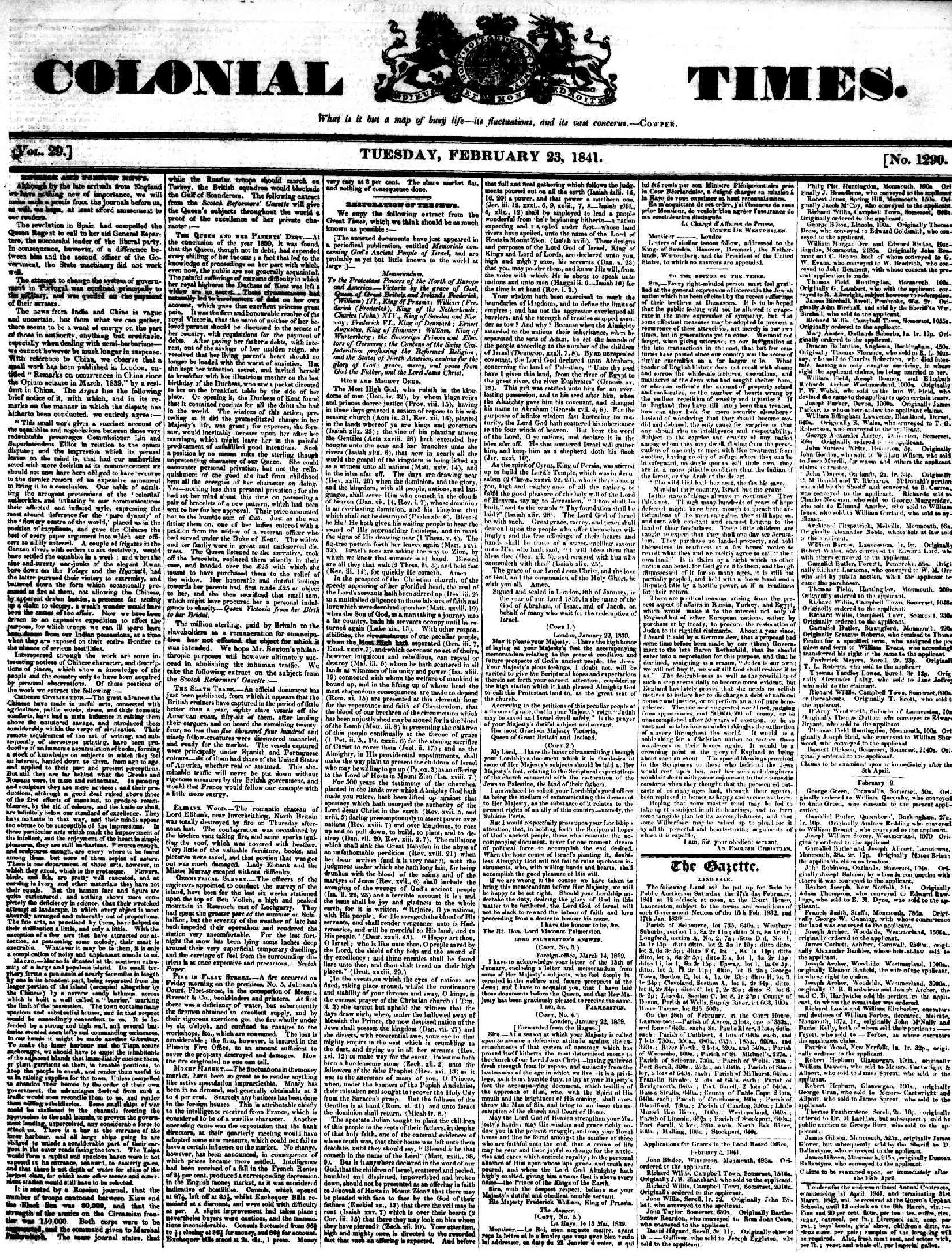
"Memorandum to the Protestant Powers of the North of Europe and America", published in the Colonial Times (Hobart, Tasmania, Australia), in 1841

The Reformation led to the emergence of the belief of a return of the Jews to Palestine due to a specific theological biblical interpretation, among some Protestant Christian thinkers, and originally as an anti-Catholic and anti-Muslim movement.

Christian restorationist ideas promoting the migration of Jews to Palestine contributed to the ideological and historical context that gave a sense of credibility to pre-Zionist initiatives. Restorationists believed that the "return" of Jews to Palestine will result in the second coming of Jesus, universal resurrection of the dead, and the conversion of the Jews to Christianity.

Restorationist ideas were a prerequisite for the success of Zionism, since although it was created by Jews, Zionism was dependent on support from Christians, although it is unclear how much Christian ideas influenced the early Zionists. Zionism was also dependent on the thinkers of the Haskalah or Jewish enlightenment, such as Peretz Smolenskin in 1872, although it often depicted it as its opponent.

Such restorationist ideas in Christian Zionism were criticised by Gershom Gorenberg in his book "The End of Days," where he highlights the troubling aspect of this messianic scenario—the disappearance of Jews. Evangelical figures such as Jerry Falwell believe the establishment of Israel is a pivotal event signaling the Second Coming of Christ and the eventual End times. As a result, Christian Zionists have significantly contributed politically and financially to Israeli nationalist forces, with the understanding that Israel's role is to facilitate the Second Coming of Christ and the elimination of Judaism.

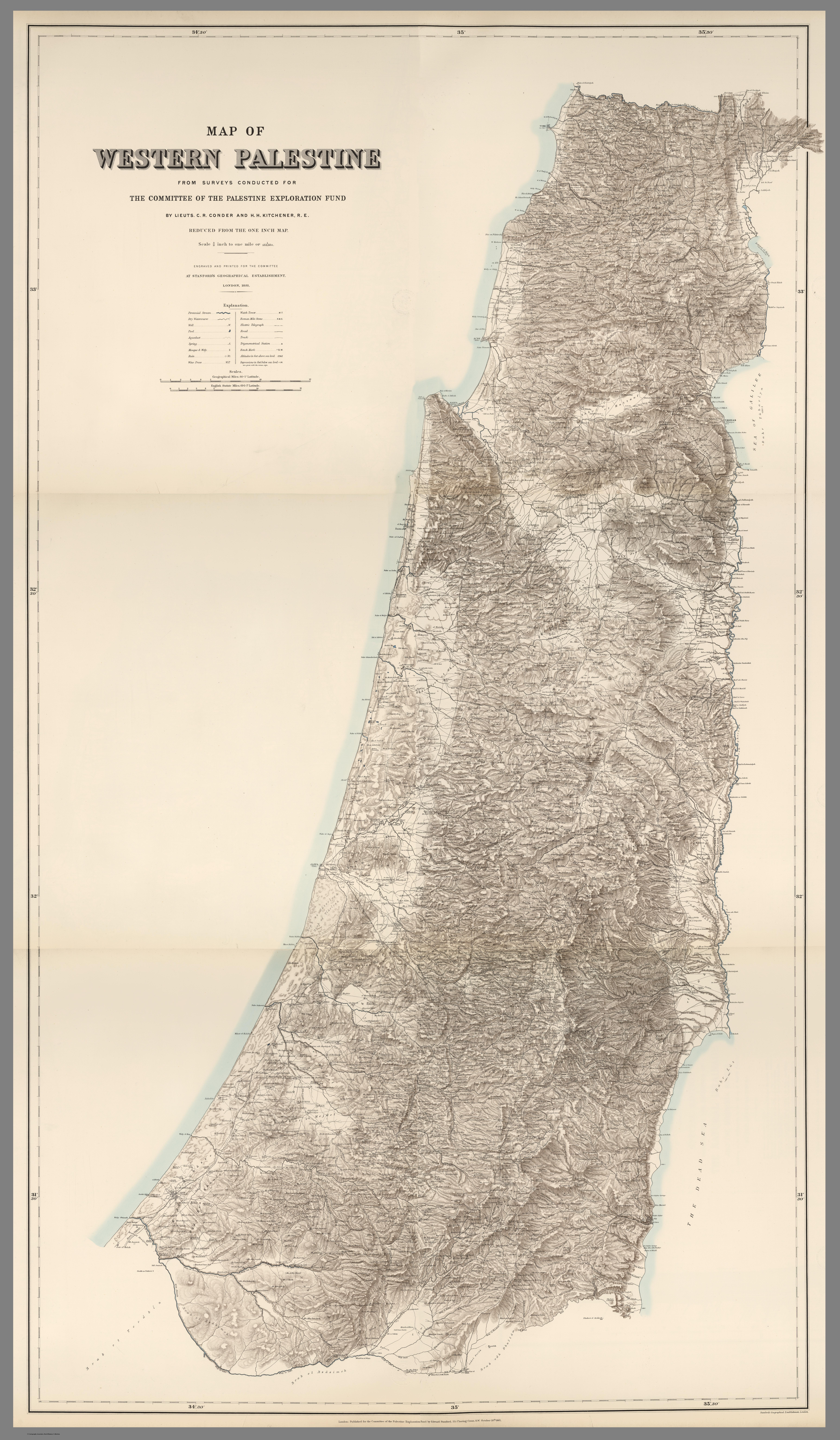
A composite map of the London-based Palestine Exploration Fund's 1877 Survey of Western Palestine. Nur Masalha writes that the survey project led to a growth of proto-Zionism.

One of the principal Protestant teachers who promoted the biblical doctrine that the Jews would return to their national homeland was John Nelson Darby. His doctrine of dispensationalism is credited with promoting Zionism, following his 11 lectures on the hopes of the church, the Jew and the gentile given in Geneva in 1840.

For Herzl, Christians who supported Zionism were allies, whatever their motives. Addressing the Second Zionist Congress in 1898 Herzl commented that there those who criticised Zionism for erecting new dividing lines but also for welcoming the friendship of Christian Zionists.

Donald M. Lewis claimed that the first modern Zionists were Christians and that their contribution had been ignored by traditional Zionist historiography.

=== Early British and American support for a Jewish state in Palestine ===
Ideas of the restoration of the Jews in the Land of Israel entered British public discourse in the early 19th century, at about the same time as the British Protestant Revival.

Not all such attitudes were favourable towards the Jews; they were shaped in part by a variety of Protestant beliefs, or by a streak of philo-Semitism among the classically educated British elite, or by hopes to extend the Empire (see The Great Game).

At the urging of Lord Shaftesbury, Britain established a consulate in Jerusalem in 1838, the first diplomatic appointment in the city. In 1839, the Church of Scotland sent Andrew Bonar and Robert Murray M'Cheyne to report on the condition of the Jews there. The report was widely published and was followed by Memorandum to Protestant Monarchs of Europe for the restoration of the Jews to Palestine. In August 1840, The Times reported that the British government was considering Jewish restoration. Correspondence in 1841–42 between Moses Montefiore, the President of the Board of Deputies of British Jews and Charles Henry Churchill, the British consul in Damascus, is seen as the first recorded plan proposed for political Zionism.

Lord Lindsay wrote in 1847: "The soil of Palestine still enjoys her sabbaths, and only waits for the return of her banished children, and the application of industry, commensurate with her agricultural capabilities, to burst once more into universal luxuriance, and be all that she ever was in the days of Solomon."

In 1851, correspondence between Lord Stanley, whose father became British Prime Minister the following year, and Benjamin Disraeli, who became Chancellor of the Exchequer alongside him, records Disraeli's proto-Zionist views: "He then unfolded a plan of restoring the nation to Palestine—said the country was admirably suited for them—the financiers all over Europe might help—the Porte is weak—the Turks/holders of property could be bought out—this, he said, was the object of his life..." Coningsby was merely a feeler, my views were not fully developed at that time—since then all I have written has been for one purpose. The man who should restore the Hebrew race to their country would be the Messiah—the real saviour of prophecy!" He did not add formally that he aspired to play this part, but it was evidently implied. He thought very highly of the capabilities of the country, and hinted that his chief object in acquiring power here would be to promote the return". 26 years later, Disraeli wrote in his article entitled "The Jewish Question is the Oriental Quest" (1877) that within fifty years, a nation of one million Jews would reside in Palestine under the guidance of the British.

Moses Montefiore, who visited multiple countries to help alleviate the oppression of their local populations of Jews, visited Palestine seven times. He sought to develop the self-reliance of the Jewish community, so there was not a need to rely on support from the diaspora. Through these efforts he helped to establish settlements outside of Old Jerusalem, where the majority of the Jewish community lived.

In 1842, Joseph Smith, founder of the Latter Day Saints movement, sent a representative, Orson Hyde, to dedicate the land of Israel for the return of the Jews. Protestant theologian William Eugene Blackstone submitted a petition to the US president in 1891; the Blackstone Memorial called for the return of Palestine to the Jews.

=== First Aliyah (1881–1903) ===
In the late 1870s, Jewish philanthropists such as the Montefiore and the Rothschilds responded to the persecution of Jews in Eastern Europe by sponsoring agricultural settlements for Russian Jews in Palestine. The Jews who migrated in this period are known as the First Aliyah. Aliyah is a Hebrew word meaning "ascent", referring to the act of spiritually "ascending" to the Holy Land and a basic tenet of Zionism.

The movement of Jews to Palestine was opposed by the Haredi communities who lived in the Four Holy Cities, since they were very poor and lived off charitable donations from Europe, which they feared would be used by the newcomers. However, from 1800 there was a movement of Sephardi businessmen from North Africa and the Balkans to Jaffa and the growing community there perceived modernity and Aliyah as the key to salvation. Unlike the Haredi communities, the Jaffa community did not maintain separate Ashkenazi and Sephardi institutions and functioned as a single unified community.

Founded in 1878, Rosh Pinna and Petah Tikva were the first modern Jewish settlements.

In 1881–1882 the tsar sponsored a huge wave of pogroms in the Russian Empire and a massive wave of Jews began leaving, mainly for America. So many Russian Jews arrived in Jaffa that the town ran out of accommodation and the local Jews began forming communities outside the Jaffa city walls. However, the migrants faced difficulty finding work (the new settlements mainly needed farmers and builders) and 70% ultimately left, mostly moving on to America. One of the migrants in this period, Eliezer Ben-Yehuda set about modernising Hebrew so that it could be used as a national language.

Rishon LeZion was founded on 31 July 1882 by a group of ten members of Hovevei Zion from Kharkov (today's Ukraine). Zikhron Ya'akov was founded in December 1882 by Hovevei Zion pioneers from Romania. In 1887 Neve Tzedek was built just outside Jaffa. Over 50 Jewish settlements were established in this period.

In 1890, Palestine, which was part of the Ottoman Empire, was inhabited by about half a million people, mostly Muslim and Christian Arabs, but also some dozens of thousands Jews.

=== Revival of the Hebrew language ===
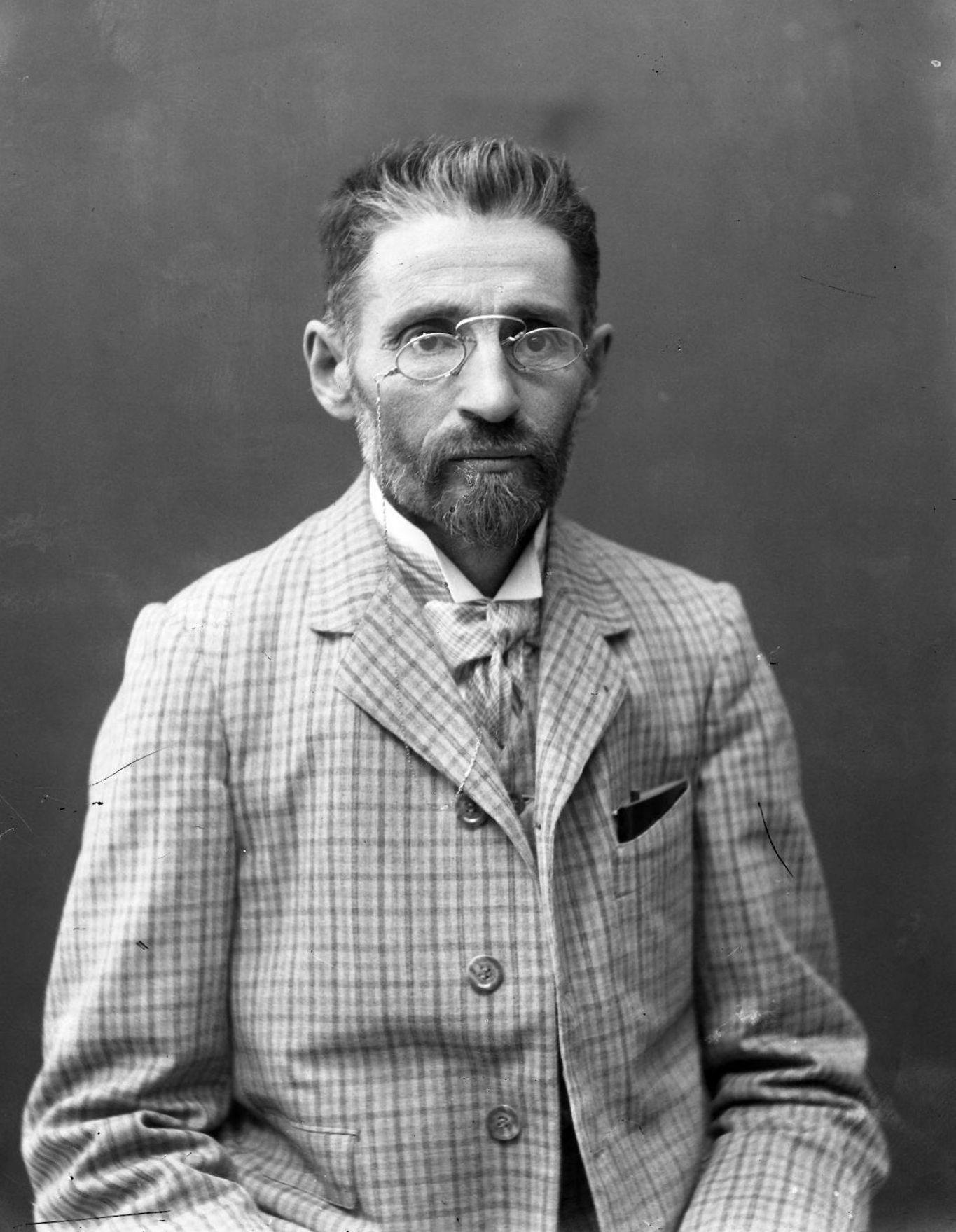
Eliezer Ben-Yehuda (1858–1922), founder and leader of the movement to revive the Hebrew language, is considered the father of Modern Hebrew.

The revival of the Hebrew language in Eastern Europe as a secular literary medium marked a significant cultural shift among Jews, who traditionally used Hebrew for religious purposes. The effort to revive the Hebrew language as a spoken vernacular pre-dated Zionism. The establishment of Modern Hebrew is most closely associated with the linguist Eliezer Ben-Yehuda and the Committee of the Hebrew Language (later replaced by the Academy of the Hebrew Language). It was an influential cause in early Jewish agricultural settlements, that was adopted enthusiastically by participants of the Second Aliyah. Having avoided the question previously, the World Zionist Organization came down decisively in favour of the use of Hebrew in 1913, following massive popular agitation in the Yishuv.

According to Alain Dieckhoff, the primary motivation for adopting Hebrew as a national language was the desire to establish apparent continuity between ancient and modern Jews to help solidify the legitimacy of Zionism. Zionist leaders such as Ben Gurion also saw the Hebrew language as an essential component of strengthening cultural unity among the Jewish people. These developments are seen in Zionist historiography as a revolt against tradition, with the development of Modern Hebrew providing the basis on which a Jewish cultural renaissance might develop.

== Birth of Zionism ==
=== Persecution of Jews in the Russian Empire ===
Jews in Eastern Europe faced constant pogroms and persecution in Tsarist Russia. From 1791 they were only allowed to live in the Pale of Settlement. In response to the Jewish drive for integration and modern education and the movement for emancipation, the Tsars imposed tight quotas on schools, universities and cities to prevent entry by Jews. From 1827 to 1917 Russian Jewish boys were required to serve 25 years in the Russian army, starting at the age of 12. The intention was to forcibly destroy their ethnic identity, however the move severely radicalised Russia's Jews and familiarised them with nationalism and socialism. The Tsar's chief adviser Konstantin Pobedonostsev, was reported as saying that one-third of Russia's Jews were expected to emigrate, one-third to accept baptism, and one-third to starve.

After a new wave of Russian pogroms, the former assimilationist Leon Pinsker concluded that the root of the Jewish problem was that Jews formed a distinctive element that could not be assimilated. For Pinsker, emancipation could not resolve the problems of the Jewish people. In Pinsker's analysis, antisemitism was primarily driven by Jews' lack of a homeland. The solution Pinsker proposed in his 1882 pamphlet Autoemancipation was for Jews to become a "normal" nation and acquire a homeland over which they would have sovereignty. Pinsker primarily viewed Jewish emigration a solution for dealing with the "surplus of Jews, the inassimilable residue" from Eastern Europe who had arrived in Germany in response to the pogroms. (Note: Pinsker wrote: "The fact that, as it seems, we can mix with the nations only in the smallest proportions, presents a further obstacle to the establishment of amicable relations. Therefore, we must see to it that the surplus of Jews, the inassimilable residue, is removed and provided for elsewhere. This duty can be incumbent upon no one but ourselves," Leo Pinsker, "Auto-Emancipation," in Hertzberg, 1959, p. 193. And Nordau wrote, in an otherwise sympathetic presentation of the Ostjuden, that: "'the contempt created by the impudent, crawling beggar in dirty caftan... falls back on all of us,'" quoted in Aschheim, 1982, p. 88.)

The pogroms motivated a small number of Jews to establish groups in the Pale of Settlement (a region in western Russia) and Poland, aimed at supporting Jewish emigration to Palestine. The publication of Autoemancipation provided these groups with an ideological charter around which they were confederated into Hibbat Zion ("Lovers of Zion") in 1887, where Pinsker took a leading role. The settlements established by Hibbat Zion lacked sufficient funds and were ultimately not very successful but are seen as the first of several aliyahs, or waves of settlement, that led to the eventual establishment of the state of Israel. The conditions in Eastern Europe eventually provided Zionism with a base of Jews seeking to overcome the challenges of external ostracism, from the Tsarist regime, and internal changes within the Jewish communities there. The groups that formed Hibbat Zion included the Bilu group, which established its first settlement in 1882. Anita Shapira describes the Bilu as serving the role of a prototype for the settlement groups that followed. At the end of the 19th century, Jews remained a small minority in Palestine.

In 1883, Nathan Birnbaum, 19 years old, founded Kadimah, the first Jewish student association in Vienna and printed Pinsker's pamphlet Autoemancipation.

In 1903, a pogrom occurred in the town of Kishinev, in the Russian empire's Bessarabia Governorate, now in Moldova, in which 47 Jews were murdered, and 98 gravely injured, thousands of homes and shops destroyed, and hundreds of young girls and women raped. A local Zionist activist, Jacob Bernstein Kogan, raised money from wealthy Jewish residents and sent telegrams to various world press centres. The Zionist movement sent a young journalist, Hayim Nahman Bialik, who, along with a reporter sent by US news magnate William Randolph Hearst, spent weeks interviewing the survivors of the Kishinev pogrom and reporting in detail what had happened, leading to a European and American outcry. Bialik wrote an epic poem "In the City of Slaughter", criticising the Jews for their failure to adequately defend themselves. The poem became a rallying cry for generations of Zionist activists. The Tsarist government, as a response to the pogrom, chose to engage in directed repression against the Zionist movement in Russia.

The pogrom occurred due to the active efforts of Pavel Krushevan, a member of the Black Hundreds, who printed a series of articles in the Znamya which became the The Protocols of the Elders of Zion. In this endeavour Krushevan was aided by the Tsarist Secret Police. The Protocols of the Elders of Zion went on to achieve global notoriety, in part thanks to the efforts of Henry Ford and The Dearborn Independent. In 1903, Krushevan claimed that the protocols revealed the menace of Zionism:

... which has the goal of uniting all the Jews of the whole world in one union—a union that is more closely knit and more dangerous than the Jesuits.

Widespread pogroms accompanied the 1905 Russian Revolution, inspired by the pro-Tsarist Black Hundreds. In Odessa, Leon Trotsky provided arms so the Zionists could protect the Jewish community and this prevented a pogrom. Zionist leader Jabotinsky eventually led the Jewish resistance in Odessa. During his subsequent trial Trotsky produced evidence that the police had organised the effort to create a pogrom in Odessa.

=== Dreyfus and Herzl ===
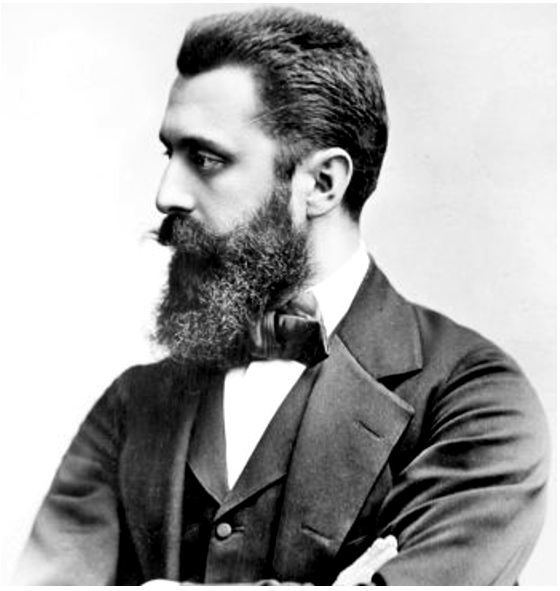
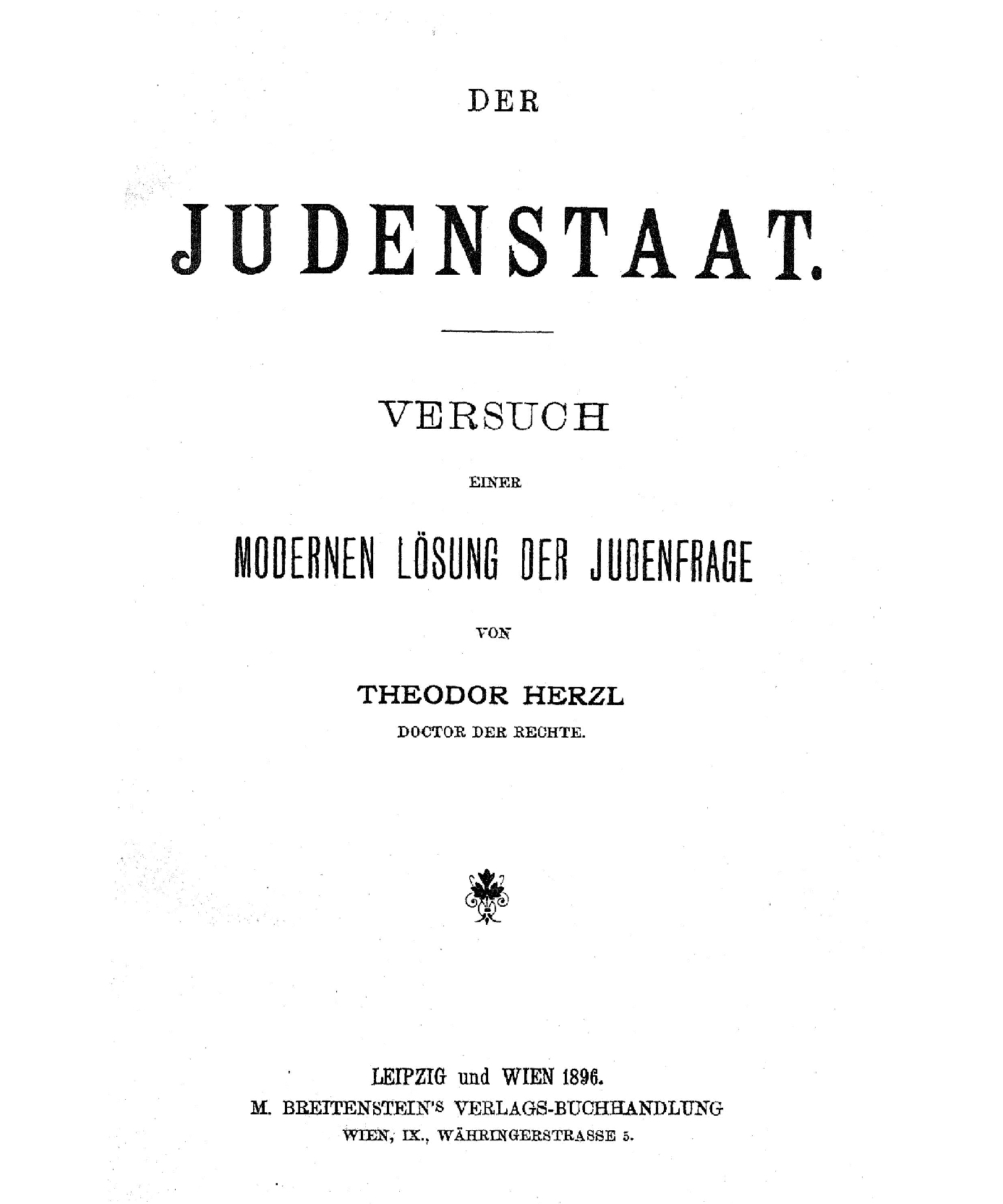

Theodor Herzl and his 1896 book, The Jewish State.

A key event that put the modern Zionist movement in motion was the Dreyfus affair, which erupted in France in 1894. The case had a profound impact on Central and Western European Jews. The depth of antisemitism in the first country to grant Jews equal rights led many to question their future prospects among Christians. Among those who witnessed the Affair was an Austro-Hungarian Jewish journalist, Theodor Herzl.

Herzl was born in Budapest and lived in Vienna (Jews were only allowed to live in Vienna from 1848). In 1896 he published the manifesto Der Judenstaat ("The Jewish State"), and in 1902 he published Altneuland ("The Old New Land"). He described the Dreyfus Affair as a personal turning point. Seeing Dreyfus's Jewishness used so successfully as a scapegoat by the monarchist propagandists disillusioned Herzl. Dreyfus's guilt was deemed indisputable simply because Jewish stereotypes of nefariousness prevented a fair trial from occurring. Herzl outright denied that any such Jewish stereotypes were rooted in reality in any way. However, he believed that antisemitism was so deeply ingrained in European society that only the creation of a Jewish state, a state where Jews would be the majority and as a result, politically dominant, would enable them to join the family of nations and escape antisemitism. This view aligned Herzl with Pinsker.

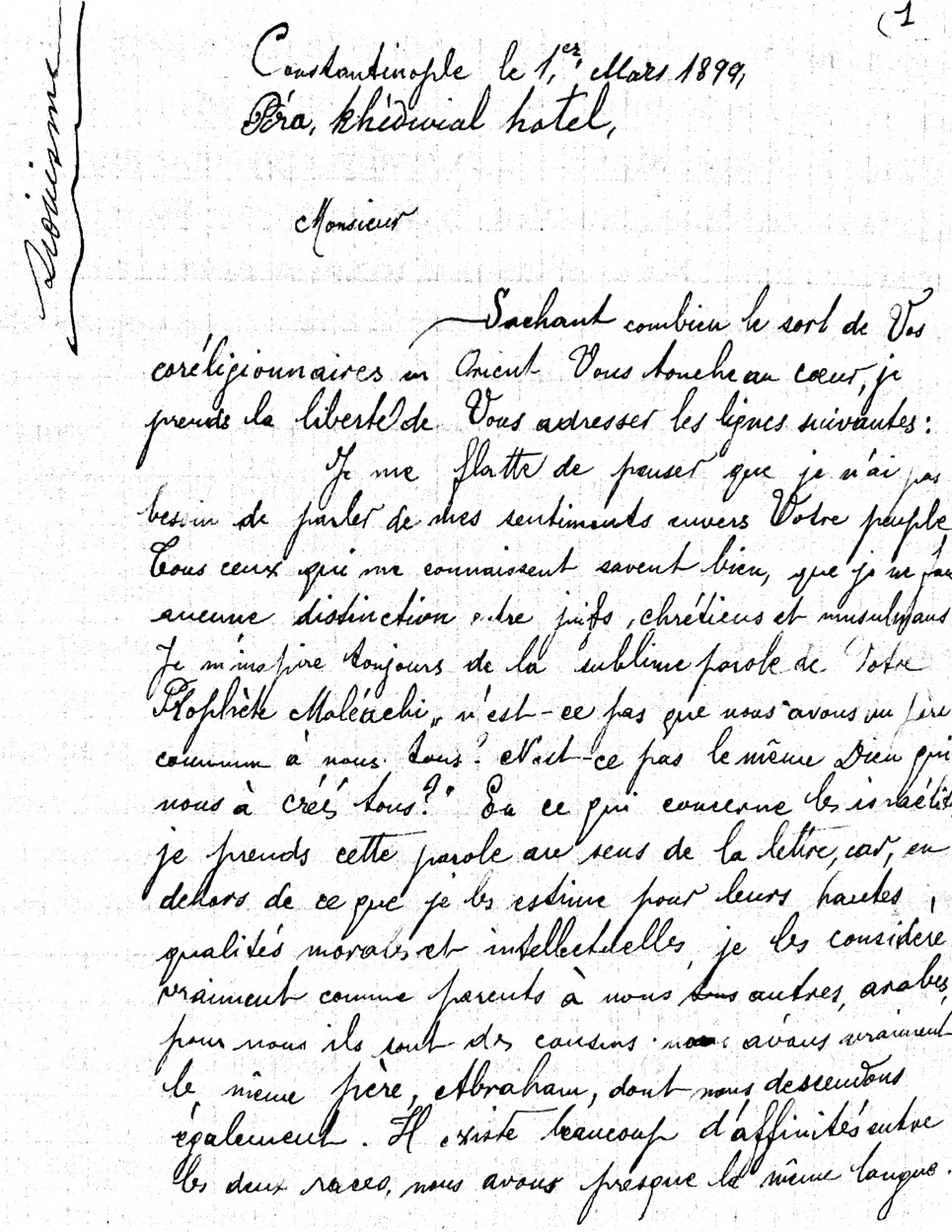
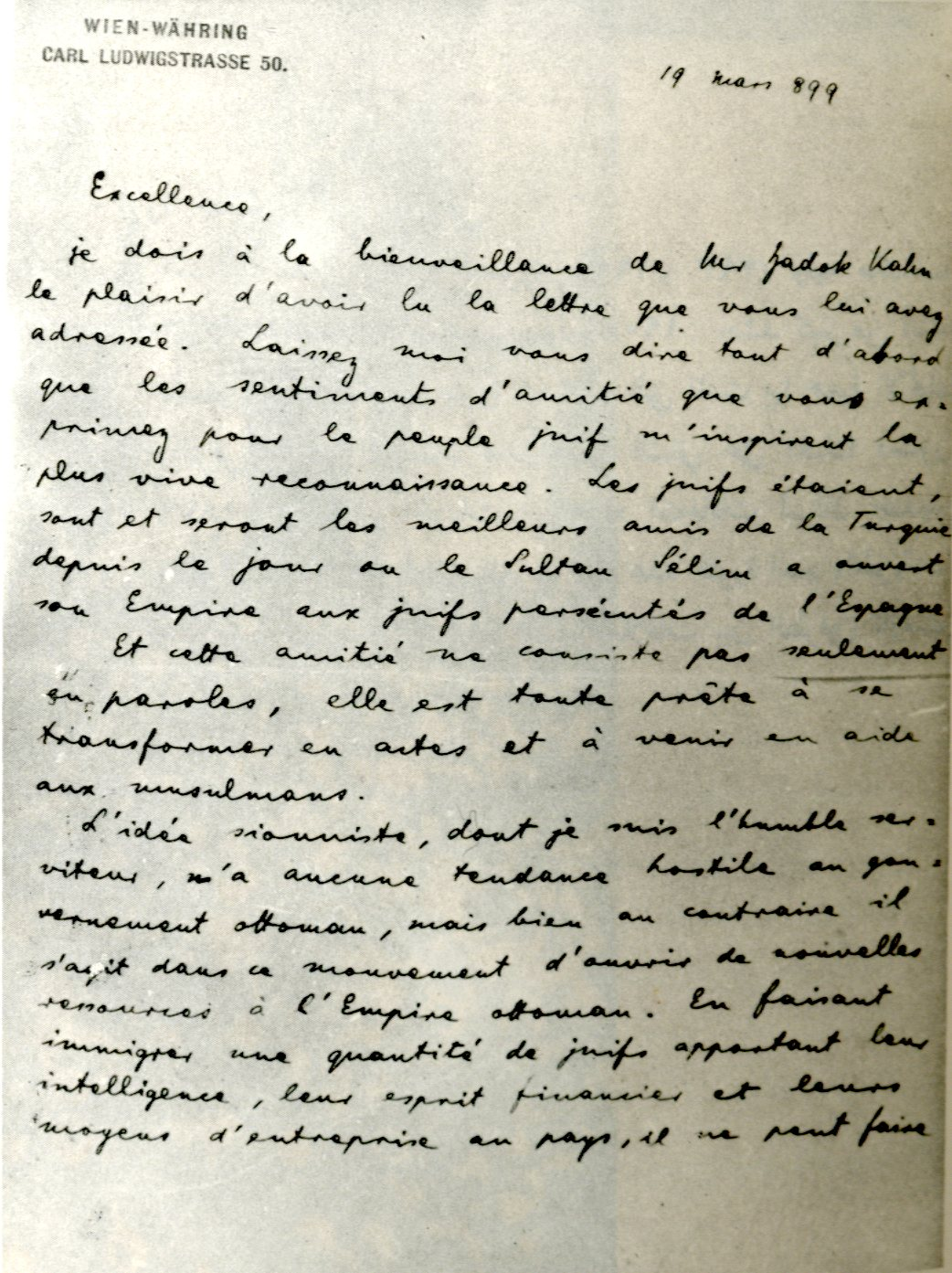
March 1899 correspondence between Yousef al-Khalidi, mayor of Jerusalem and author of the letter on the left, and Theodore Herzl, founder of the Zionist Organization and author of the letter on the right.

Herzl's project was purely secular; the selection of Palestine, after considering other locations, was motivated by the credibility the name would give to the movement. From early on, Herzl recognised that Zionism could not succeed without the support of a great power. He hoped that his state would support the great powers' interests and "form part of a defensive wall for Europe in Asia, an outpost of civilisation against barbarism."

Herzl's most notable Zionist critic was Ahad Ha'am, the founder of cultural Zionism, who criticised the lack of Jewish cultural activity and creativity in Herzl's envisioned state, which Ha'am referred to as "the state of the Jews" rather than a Jewish state. He was aware of the existence of the Arab population and believed that mass Jewish colonisation and statehood would result in domination over the Arabs which would not enable the renewal of the Jewish soul. He believed that the recovery of a Jewish identity through a national cultural revival should be Zionism's priority, rather than statehood, and that a Jewish centre in Palestine could exist harmoniously with the Arab population and serve rather than replace the diaspora.

=== The Zionist congress ===
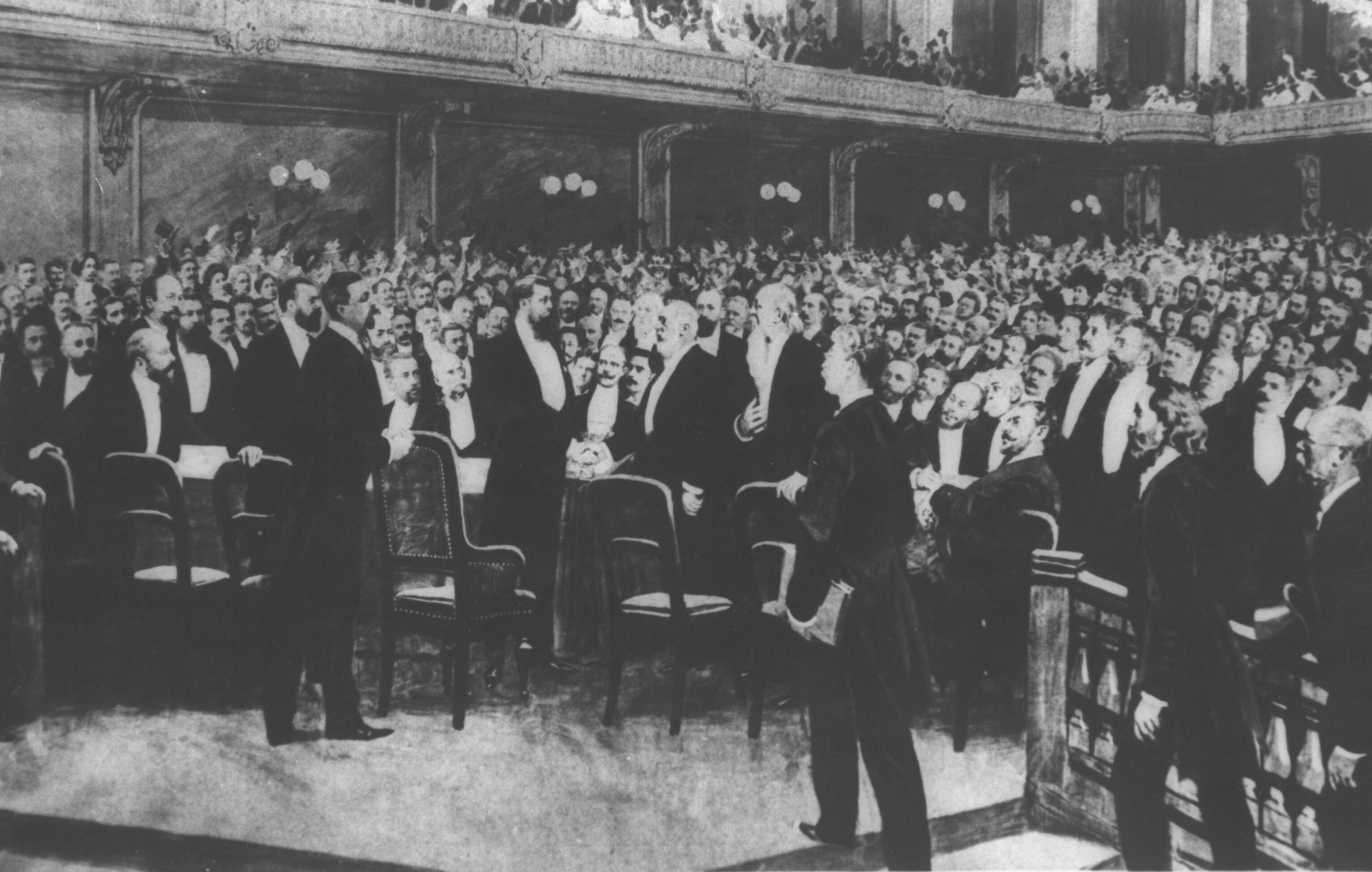
The delegates at the First Zionist Congress, held at the Stadtcasino in Basel, Switzerland (1897)

Herzl's efforts, alongside the efforts of Birnbaum, led to the First Zionist Congress at Basel in 1897, which created the Zionist Organization (ZO), renamed in 1960 as World Zionist Organization (WZO), and adopted the Basel Program, which codified the official objective of establishing a legally recognised home for the Jewish people in Palestine. The Zionist Organization was to be the main administrative body of the movement and would go on to establish the Jewish Colonial Trust, whose objectives were to encourage European Jewish emigration to Palestine and to assist with the economic development of Palestine, via its subsidiary the Anglo-Palestine Bank, now Bank Leumi.

In the Basel program, the draft of the objective of the modern Zionist movement submitted to the First Zionist Congress of the Zionist Organization in 1897 read: "Zionism seeks to establish a home for the Jewish people in Palestine secured by law." One delegate sought to replace "by law" with "by international law", which was opposed by others. A compromise formula was adopted that read:

Zionism seeks to establish a home in Palestine for the Jewish people, secured under public law. (Note: "Der Zionismus erstrebt für das jüdische Volk die Schaffung einer öffentlich-rechtlich gesicherten Heimstätte in Palästina." The original proposal had "rechtlich" rather than "öffentlich-rechtlich" but was altered during the Congress.) "Under public law" is generally understood to mean seeking legal permission from the Ottoman rulers for Jewish migration. In this text the word "home" was substituted for "state" and "public law" for "international law" so as not to alarm the Ottoman Sultan.

Further the Basel program outlined that:

The Congress contemplates the following means to the attainment of this end:

1. The promotion by appropriate means of the settlement in Palestine of Jewish farmers, artisans, and manufacturers.
2. The organisation and uniting of the whole of Jewry by means of appropriate institutions, both local and international, in accordance with the laws of each country.
3. The strengthening and fostering of Jewish national sentiment and national consciousness.
4. Preparatory steps toward obtaining the consent of governments, where necessary, in order to reach the goals of Zionism.

Theodor Herzl addresses the Second Zionist Congress in 1898

Early Zionists initially envisioned a limited autonomy within a larger multinational framework. During the British Mandate, these aspirations evolved into discussions that considered binational federalist models that sought to reconcile Jewish national goals with coexistence and shared governance with the Arab population in Palestine.

However, as the political landscape hardened — marked by growing Arab opposition and shifting British policies — a broad consensus favouring the establishment of a fully independent Jewish state gradually emerged. According to historian Walter Laqueur, the bi-national solution was advocated in only a "half-hearted way" by the Zionist movement. In Laqueur's analysis, the proposal relied on the unrealistic expectation of gaining Arab agreement. Arabs rejected bi-nationalism and parity, feeling no need to compromise on Palestine's Arab identity and were particularly concerned that increased Jewish immigration would threaten their status in Palestine.

In the search for support, Herzl, before his death, had made the most progress with the German Kaiser, joining him on his 1898 trip to Palestine.

=== Territories considered ===
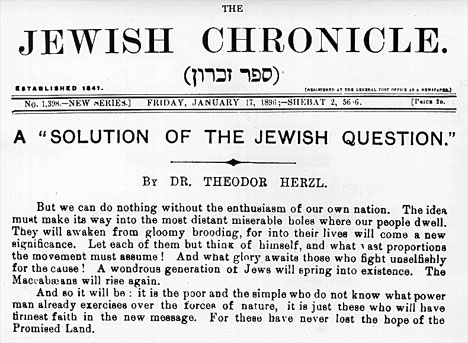
Front page of The Jewish Chronicle, 17 January 1896, showing an article by Theodor Herzl, a month prior to the publication of his pamphlet Der Judenstaat

Throughout the first decade of the Zionist movement, Herzl and other Zionist figures considered locations for a Jewish state outside of the Land of Israel, such as "Uganda" (actually parts of British East Africa that are today in Kenya), Argentina, Cyprus, Mesopotamia, Mozambique, and the Sinai Peninsula. Herzl was initially content with any Jewish self-governed state.

In 1903, the British Colonial Secretary, Joseph Chamberlain, proposed the Uganda scheme, where he offered 5,000 square miles (13,000 km^{2}) of land to Herzl for a Jewish state in British East Africa.

Jewish settlement of Argentina was the project of Maurice de Hirsch. It is unclear if Herzl seriously considered this alternative plan; however, he later affirmed that only Palestine could gain enough Jewish support because of the historic ties of Jews with that area. A major concern and driving reason for considering other territories was the Russian pogroms, in particular the Kishinev massacre, and the resulting need for quick resettlement in a safer place.

However, other Zionists emphasised the memory, emotion and tradition linking Jews to the Land of Israel. Palestine only became Herzl's main focus after his Zionist manifesto 'Der Judenstaat' was published in 1896, but even then he was hesitant to focus efforts solely on resettlement in Palestine when speed was of the essence.

A committee was established to investigate the possibility of the Uganda scheme, but after Herzl died in 1904, at the Seventh Zionist Congress in 1905 it was decided to decline the British offer and to "direct all future settlement efforts solely to Palestine." Following the vote, which had been proposed by Max Nordau, Israel Zangwill said to Nordau that he "will be charged before the bar of history," and his supporters blamed the Russian voting bloc of Menachem Ussishkin for the outcome of the vote.

Israel Zangwill left the main Zionist movement over this decision and founded the Jewish Territorialist Organization (ITO). The territorialists were willing to establish a Jewish homeland anywhere, but failed to attract significant support and were dissolved in 1925. The departure of the ITO from the Zionist Organization had little impact. The Zionist Socialist Workers Party was also an organisation that favoured the idea of a Jewish territorial autonomy outside of Palestine.

According to Elaine Hagopian, in the early decades the World Zionist Organization foresaw the homeland of the Jews as extending not only over the region of Palestine, but into Lebanon, Syria, Jordan, and Egypt.

== Early Zionist settlement ==
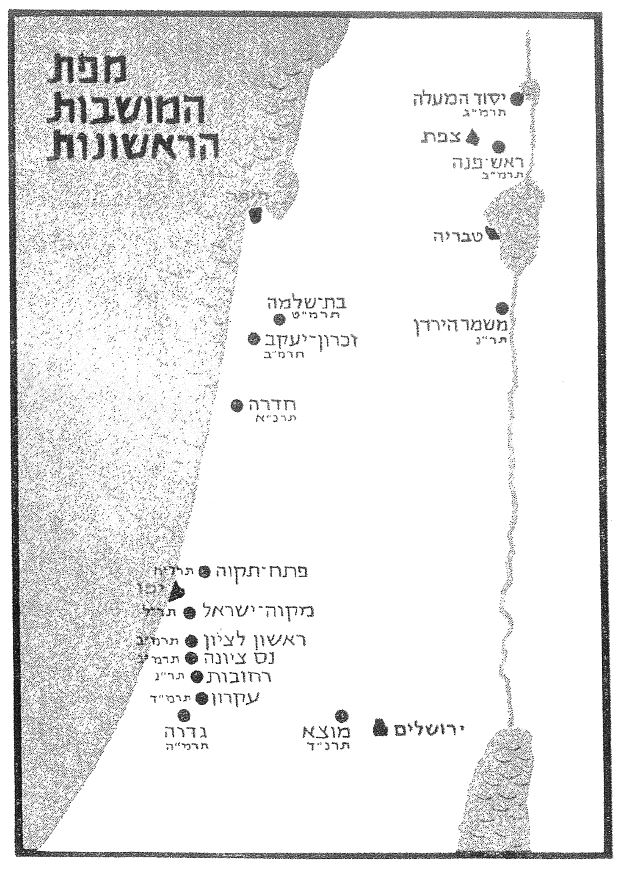
A map of early moshavot, Jewish agricultural settlements established during the first and second waves of Zionist migration to Palestine.

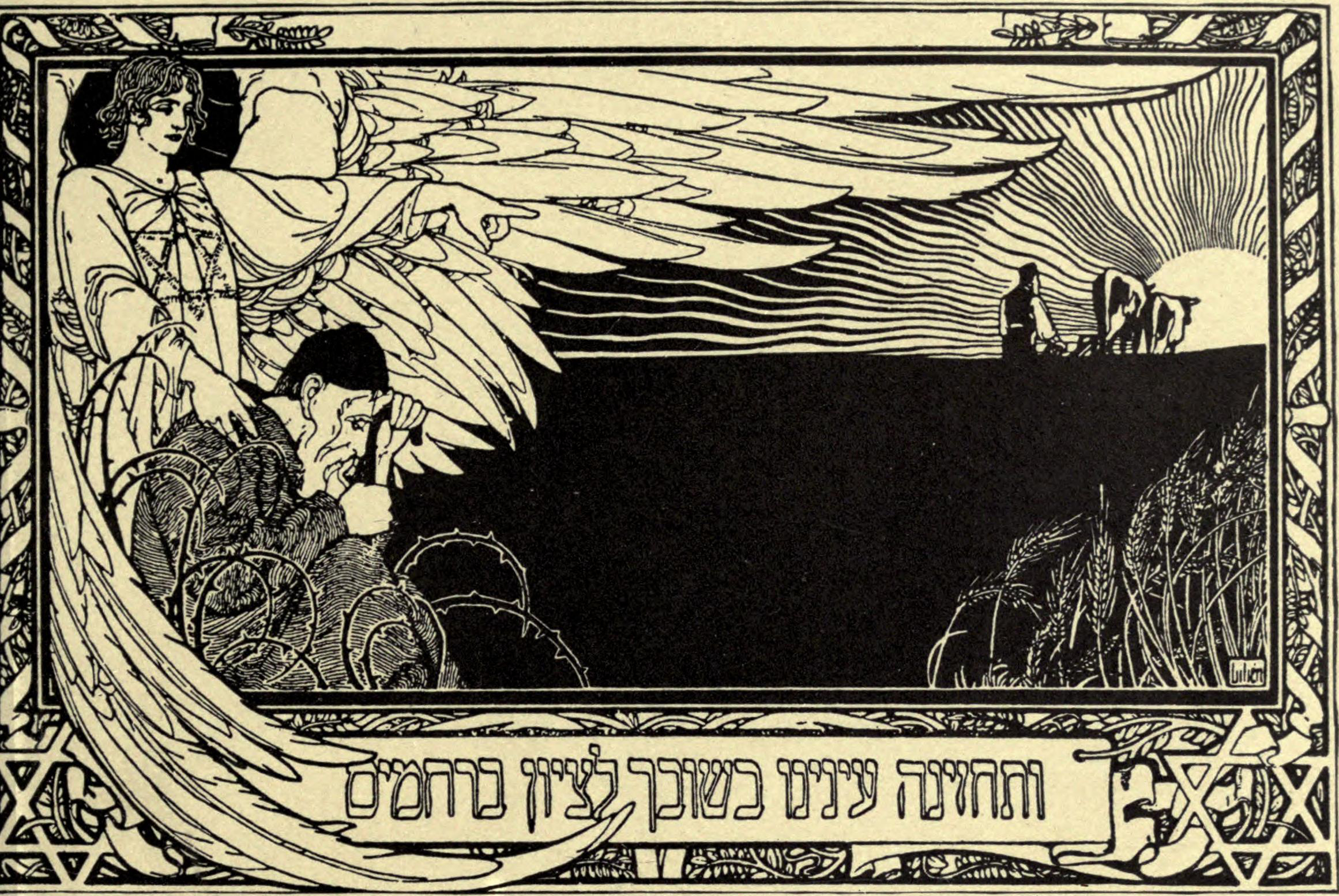
May our eyes behold your return in mercy to Zion. Design by Lilien to the Fifth Zionist Congress, Basel, 1901

The 1906 edition of the Jewish Encyclopedia noted the movement's spread: "not only in the number of Jews affiliated with the Zionist organization and congress, but also in the fact that there is hardly a nook or corner of the Jewish world in which Zionistic societies are not to be found."

In the early twentieth century, Zionism advanced by establishing towns, colonies, and an independent monetary system in Palestine. Due to the unstable local economy and fluctuating currency values under Ottoman rule, Zionists created their own financial institutions. Despite their small numbers, the Zionists instilled a fear of territorial displacement in the local population, which led to Palestinian resistance and the settlers' eventual use of military force. Initially, the impact on rural Palestinians was minimal, with only a few villages encountering Jewish colonies. However, after World War I and as Zionist land purchases increased, the rural population began to experience dramatic changes. From almost the beginning of Zionist settlement, Palestinians viewed Zionism as an expansionist endeavour. According to Israeli historian Benny Morris, Zionism was inherently expansionist and always had the goal of turning the entirety of Palestine into a Jewish state. In addition, Morris describes the Zionists as intent on politically and physically dispossessing the Arabs. Early warnings from local leaders in the 1880s about the destabilising effects of Jewish immigration went largely unheeded until these later developments. By the early 20th century, there were fourteen Zionist settlements in Palestine, established through land purchases from both local and external landowners.

The Life of the Jews in Palestine, a Russian documentary film by Noah Sokolovsky presented at the 11th Zionist congress in 1913.

From the outset, the Zionist leadership saw land acquisition as essential to achieving their goal of establishing a Jewish state. This acquisition was strategic, aiming to create a continuous area of Jewish land. The WZO established the Jewish National Fund (JNF) in 1901, with the stated goal "to redeem the land of Palestine as the inalienable possession of the Jewish people." The notion of land "redemption" entailed that the land could not be sold and could not be leased to a non-Jew nor should the land be worked by Arabs, though most Zionists continued to employ fellaheen to perform labour on their lands. The land purchased was primarily from absentee landlords, and upon purchase of the land, the tenant farmers who traditionally had rights of usufruct were often expelled. Herzl publicly opposed this dispossession, but wrote privately in his diary: "We shall try to spirit the penniless population across the border by procuring employment for it in the transit countries, while denying it any employment in our country... Both the process of expropriation and the removal of the poor must be carried out discreetly and circumspectly." The arrival of Zionist settlers to Palestine in the late 19th century is widely seen as the start of the Israeli–Palestinian conflict. Zionists wanted to create a Jewish state in Palestine with as much land, as many Jews, and as few Palestinian Arabs as possible.

In 1903, 'the Eretz Israel assembly' was held by Menachem Ussishkin. This assembly marked the beginning of a more formalized Zionist colonization effort. Under his leadership, both professional and political organizations were established, paving the way for a sustained Zionist presence in the region. Ussishkin delineated three methods for the Zionist movement to acquire land: by force and conquest, by expropriation via governmental authority, and by purchase. The only option available to the movement at the moment in his perspective was the last one, "until at some point we become rulers".

=== Second Aliyah ===
The second wave of Zionist settlement came with the Second Aliyah starting in 1904. The settlers of this period laid the foundational elements for the Jewish society in Palestine envisioned by the Zionist movement. They established the first two political parties, the socialist Po'alei Zion and the non-socialist Ha-Po'el Ha-Tza'ir and initiated the first collective agricultural settlements known as kibbutzim, which were fundamental in the formation of the Israeli state. They also formed the first underground military group, Ha-Shomer, which later evolved into the Haganah and eventually became the core of the Israeli army. Many leaders of the Zionist national movement were products of the Second Aliyah. The Zionists of the second aliyah were also more ideologically motivated than those of the first aliyah. In particular, they sought the "conquest of labor", which entailed the exclusion of Arabs from the labour market.

=== Opposition from Orthodox Jews and Reformist Jews ===
Under Herzl's leadership, Zionism relied on Orthodox Jews for religious support, with the main party being the orthodox Mizrachi. However, as the cultural and socialist Zionists increasingly broke with tradition and used language contrary to the outlook of most religious Jewish communities, many orthodox religious organizations began opposing Zionism. Their opposition was based on its secularism and on the grounds that only the Messiah could re-establish Jewish rule in Israel.

Prior to the Holocaust, Reform Judaism rejected Zionism as inconsistent with the requirements of Jewish citizenship in the diaspora. The opposition of Reform Judaism was expressed in the Pittsburgh Platform, adopted by the Central Conference of American Rabbis in 1885: "We consider ourselves no longer a nation but a religious community, and therefore expect neither a return to Palestine, nor a sacrificial worship under the administration of the sons of Aaron, nor the restoration of any of the laws concerning the Jewish state."

== World War I ==
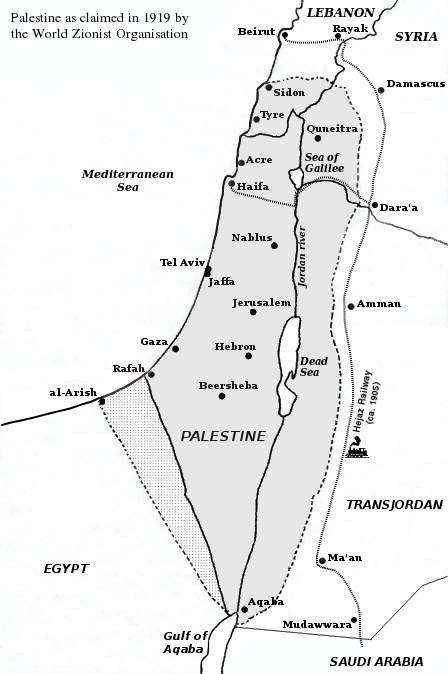
Palestine as claimed by the World Zionist Organization in 1919 at the Paris Peace Conference

=== United States ===
The Jewish population of the USA increased about ten times between 1880 and 1920, with the immigration of poorer, more liberal and radical, "downtown", Eastern European immigrants fleeing persecution in contrast to the older generations of German, Spanish and Portuguese Jews that were much more conservative and rich. It was not until 1912, when the secular "people's lawyer" Louis Brandeis became involved in Zionism, just before the First World War, that Zionism gained significant support in the US. By 1917, the American Provisional Executive Committee for General Zionist Affairs, which Brandeis chaired, had increased American Zionist membership ten times to 200,000 members; "American Jewry thenceforth became the financial center for the world Zionist movement".

While the United States was officially neutral in the early years of the First World War, most Russian and German Jews supported the Germans, as did much of the largely anti-British Irish American and German American community. Britain was anxious to win US support for its war effort, and winning over Jewish financial and popular support in the US was considered vital.

=== Europe ===
As in the US, England had experienced a rapid growth in their Jewish minority. About 150,000 Jews migrated there from Russia in the period of 1881 to 1914. With this immigration influx, pressure grew from British voters to halt it; added to the established knowledge in British society of Old Testament scripture, Zionism became an attractive solution for both Britain and the Empire. Like other countries, the British assumed that most Jews were avoiding the draft; these beliefs were groundless, but the Polish Zionist Ze'ev Jabotinsky was able to exploit it to promote a Jewish division in the British army. For the British, the Jewish Legion, was a means of recruiting Russian Jewish immigrants (who were mostly Zionists) to the British war effort. The legion was dominated by Zionist volunteers.

Before World War I, although led by Austrian and German Jews, Zionism was primarily composed of Russian Jews. Initially, Zionists were a minority, both in Russia and worldwide. Russian Zionism quickly became a major force within the movement, making up about half the delegates at Zionist Congresses.

Despite its success in attracting followers, Russian Zionism faced fierce opposition from the Russian intelligentsia across the political spectrum and socioeconomic classes. It was condemned by different groups as reactionary, messianic, and unrealistic, arguing that it would isolate Jews and exacerbate their circumstances rather than integrate them into European societies. Religious Jews such as Rabbi Joel Teitelbaum viewed in Zionism a desecration of their sacred beliefs and a Satanic plot, while others hardly thought it deserved serious attention. For them, Zionism was seen as an attempt to defy the divine order to await the coming of the Messiah. However, many of these religious Jews still believed in the Messiah coming soon. For example, Rabbi Yisrael Meir Kagan "was so convinced of the imminent arrival of the Messiah that he urged his students to study the laws of the priesthood so that the priests would be prepared to carry out their duties when the Temple in Jerusalem was rebuilt."

Criticism was not limited to religious Jews. Bundist socialists and liberals of the Voskhod newspaper attacked Zionism for distracting from class struggle and blocking the path to Jewish emancipation in Russia, respectively. Figures like historian Simon Dubnow saw potential value in Zionism promoting Jewish identity but fundamentally rejected a Jewish state as messianic and unfeasible. They provided alternative emancipatory solutions, such as assimilation, emigration, and Diaspora nationalism. The opposition to Zionism, rooted in the intelligentsia's rationalist worldview, weakened its appeal among potential adherents like the Jewish working class and intelligentsia.

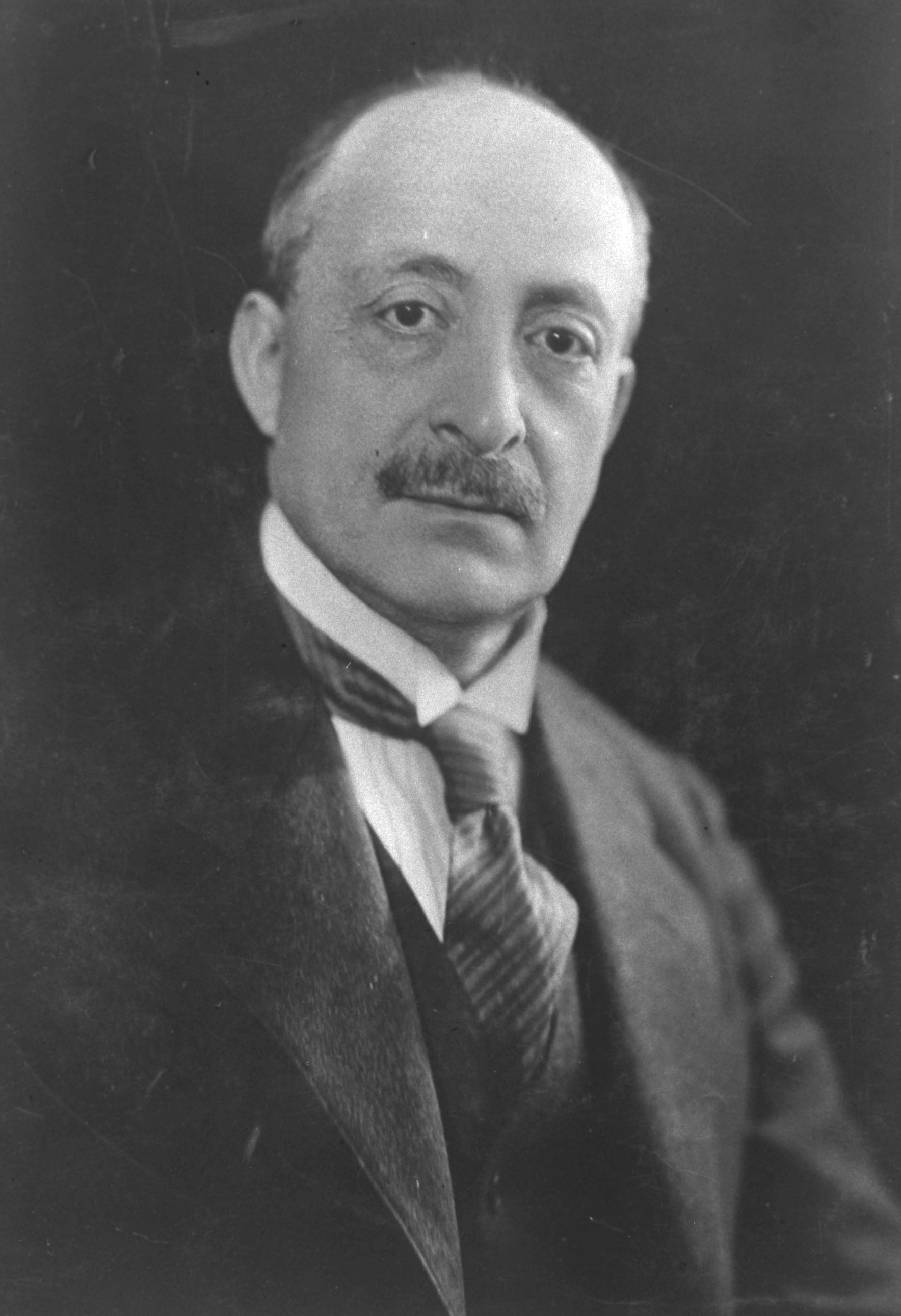
Otto Warburg president of the Zionist Organization from 1911 to 1921

At the outbreak of war in 1914, the offices of the German section of the Zionist Organization were located in Berlin and led by Otto Warburg, a German citizen. With different national sections of the movement supporting different sides in the war, Zionist policy was to maintain strict neutrality and "to demonstrate complete loyalty to Turkey", the German ally controlling Palestine.

At the start of World War I, the Zionist leadership attempted to persuade the British government of the benefits of sponsoring a Jewish colony in Palestine. Their main initial success was in establishing a lobbying group centred around the Rothschild family, largely driven by Chaim Weizmann. In January 1915, two months after the British declaration of war against the Ottomans, Zionist and British cabinet member Herbert Samuel presented a detailed memorandum entitled The Future of Palestine to the British Cabinet on the benefits of a British protectorate over Palestine to support Jewish immigration. In response to the crisis of not being able to manufacture enough artillery shells for the war effort, David Lloyd George became the minister responsible for armaments, and asked Weizmann to develop his process for the production of acetone for mass production. Lloyd George was an evangelical Christian and pro-Zionist. According to Lloyd George, when he asked Weizmann about payment for his efforts in helpin Britain, Weizmann told him that he wanted no money, just the rights over Palestine. This relationship developed further between Weizmann and Lloyd George, as the latter became prime minister in 1916. Weizmann also became a close associate of First Lord of the Admiralty and foreign secretary, Arthur Balfour.

Although 500,000 Russian Jews were serving in the Russian army, the Russian leadership regarded all Jews as their enemies and assumed that most were avoiding the draft. In 1915, following German advances in the Baltic provinces, the Russian military enacted an enemy aliens policy in the western territories of the empire, which saw Russian Germans, Poles, and Jews expelled east from the territories. This saw between 500,000 and 1,000,000 Jews forced to leave their homes in the Pale of Settlement. An estimated 100,000 died of starvation and exposure and their plight contributed to the disintegration of the Russian army.

=== Ottoman empire ===
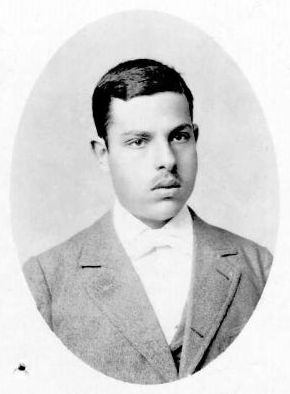
Abraham Yahuda (1877–1951) wrote that "every effort" would be needed to secure the support of Muslims in Palestine for the Zionist plan to establish a Jewish state there, and was disappointed that Herzl turned to the superpowers instead.

While there were 85,000 Jews living in Palestine in 1914, that number went down to 56,000 by 1917. The Arab population also suffered greatly during this time. When the Ottoman Empire entered the war on Germany's side in October 1914, tens of thousands of Russian Jews became enemy citizens, and many opted to leave rather than become Ottoman citizens and be subject to conscription. This gave the Ottomans an opportunity to suppress the Zionist movement. Meanwhile thousands of Ottoman Jews from across the empire were drafted into the army. The war also had a negative effect on trade in the Yishuv. On 17 January 1914, the Ottomans announced, with no prior warning, that all foreign nationals must immediately board a ship in Jaffa to be taken to Alexandria. Then in April 1917, the Ottomans ordered all Jews to leave Jaffa. In October 1917, after the Ottomans discovered that Nili had been giving intelligence to the British, they arrested people at random and imposed a curfew as collective punishment. Most Zionists came to the conclusion that there was no hope of change under the Ottomans and therefore supported the British conquest of Palestine, and they viewed the British as redeemers.

During the First World War, David Ben-Gurion and Yitzhak Ben-Tzvi both volunteered for the Ottoman army but were rejected and exiled to Egypt. They moved to the US and tried to recruit Jews to set up a Jewish unit in the Ottoman army.

In 1916 Hussein bin Ali, Sharif of Mecca (in Arabia), began an "Arab Revolt" hoping to create an Arab state in the Middle East. In the McMahon–Hussein Correspondence, British representatives promised they would allow him to create such a state (the boundaries were vague). They also provided him with large sums of money to fund his revolt.

Before 1917, Palestine's Arab population mostly saw themselves as Ottoman subjects. They feared the objectives of the Zionist movement, but they assumed the movement would fail. After the Young Turk revolution in 1908, Arab Nationalism grew rapidly in the area and most Arab Nationalists regarded Zionism as a threat, although a minority perceived Zionism as providing a path to modernity.

In April 1917, when the Ottomans ordered a general evacuation of Jaffa amid the British advance, Zionists in Britain exaggerated reports, making the evacuation one of Jews specifically, across Palestine, and reporting a fake order from Djemal Pasha that "Armenian policy will now be applied to Jews". In fact, Jews had received special care: the evacuation was postponed to after the end of Passover, and they were given accommodations denied to Arabs. The Jaffa myth helped sway the Allies to support a Jewish state as necessary to prevent persecution.

=== Balfour Declaration ===
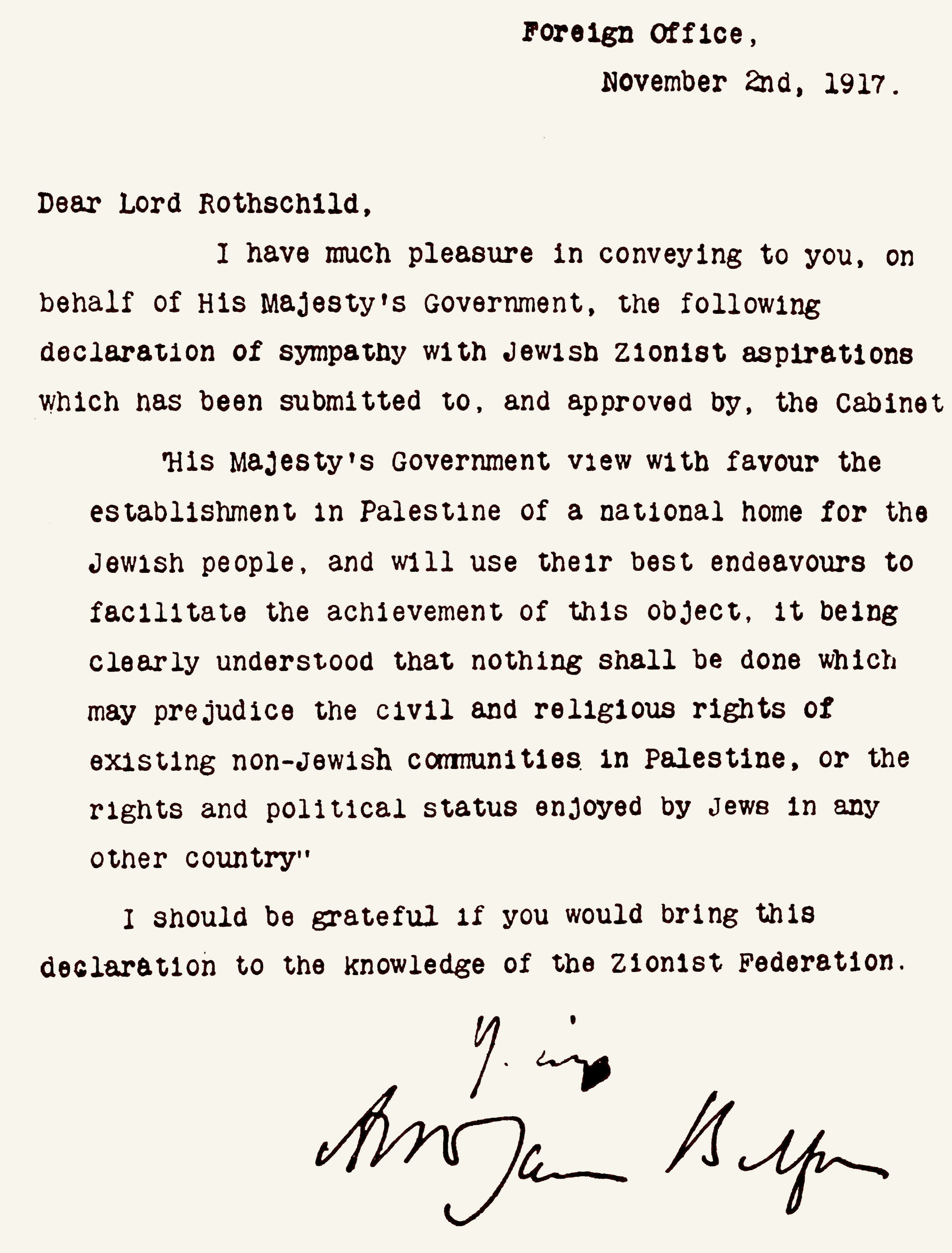
The original 1917 letter from Arthur Balfour to Lord Walter Rothschild announcing the support of the British government for the establishment of a "national home for the Jewish people" in Palestine.

In August 1917, as the British cabinet discussed the Balfour Declaration, Edwin Samuel Montagu, the only Jew in the British Cabinet and a staunch anti-Zionist, "was passionately opposed to the declaration on the grounds that (a) it was a capitulation to anti-Semitic bigotry, with its suggestion that Palestine was the natural destination of the Jews, and that (b) it would be a grave cause of alarm to the Muslim world". Additional references to the future rights of non-Jews in Palestine and the status of Jews worldwide were thus inserted by the British cabinet, reflecting the opinion of the only Jew within it. As the draft was finalized, the term "state" was replaced with "home", and comments were sought from Zionists abroad. Louis Brandeis, a member of the US Supreme Court, influenced the style of the text and changed the words "Jewish race" to "Jewish people".

On 2 November, the British Foreign Secretary, Arthur Balfour, made his landmark Balfour Declaration, publicly expressing the government's view in favour of "the establishment in Palestine of a national home for the Jewish people", and specifically noting that its establishment must not "prejudice the civil and religious rights of existing non-Jewish communities in Palestine, or the rights and political status enjoyed by Jews in any other country". However, Rashid Khalidi notes that the Balfour Declaration does not mention political or national rights for non-Jews in Palestine, who constituted 94% of the population.

The declaration was largely motivated by war-time considerations and antisemitic preconceptions about the putative influence Jews had on the Tsarist government and in the shaping of American policy. Though his decision was also motivated by religious convictions, (Note: "The irony here is in the now well-documented understanding that Lord Balfour was himself deeply religious and that his thinking on the projected post-World War 1 fate of Palestine was influenced by his expectations of the fulfullment of biblical prophecy. What disappointed Balfour, Hechler and Kook was that the secular Jewish settlers of British Mandate Palestine did not see divine Providence at work in international affairs.") Balfour himself had passed the Aliens Act 1905, which aimed to keep Eastern European Jews out of Britain. (Note: Brian Klug states that "Keeping Jews out of Britain and packing them off to Palestine were just two sides of the same antisemitic coin") More decisive were Britain's colonial and imperial geopolitical goals in the region, specifically in retaining control over the Suez Canal by establishing a pro-British state in the region. Weizmann's role in obtaining the Balfour Declaration led to his election as the Zionist movement's leader. He remained in that role until 1948, and then was elected as the first President of Israel after the nation gained independence.

For Weizmann, Palestine was a Jewish and not an Arab country. The state he sought at that period would stretch to the east of the Jordan River and extend to the Litani River (a river in Lebanon, then part of the Ottoman Empire). Weizmann's strategy involved incrementally approaching this goal over a long period, in the form of settlement and land acquisition. Weizmann was open to the idea of Arabs and Jews jointly running Palestine through an elected council with equal representation, but he did not view the Arabs as equal partners in negotiations about the country's future. In particular, he was steadfast in his view of the "moral superiority" of the Jewish claim to Palestine over the Arab claim and believed these negotiations should be conducted solely between Britain and the Jews. According to Zionist Israeli historian Simha Flapan, the essential assumptions of Weizmann's strategy were later adopted by Ben-Gurion and subsequent Zionist leaders.

The declaration was seen by the Bolsheviks of the Russian Provisional Government as confirmation of Zionism being a reactionary ideology supported by British imperialism. It also helped spur the emergence of the modern mass Palestinian nationalist movement, with the founding of the Muslim-Christian Associations in 1918 and first Palestine Arab Congress in 1919.

=== Russian revolutions ===
In February 1917 the tsar was overthrown and Alexander Kerensky became Prime Minister of the Russian Empire. Jews were prominent in the new government and the British hoped that Jewish support would help keep Russia in the war. In June 1917 the British army, led by Edmund Allenby, invaded Palestine. The Jewish Legion participated in the invasion and Jabotinsky was awarded for bravery. Arab forces conquered Transjordan and later took over Damascus.

On 7 November, five days after the Balfour declaration, the Bolsheviks led the October Revolution in Russia. The Bolshevik seizure of power led to civil war and the collapse of the Western part of the Russian Empire. During the fighting, there were pogroms across Russia perpetrated by fighters from all sides, but especially the counter-revolutionary White Army. Between 1918 and 1921, when the Bolsheviks assumed control of Ukraine, over 50,000 Jews were killed, a further 100,000 were permanently maimed or died of wounds and 200,000 Jewish children became orphans.

At the time of the Russian revolution, the Bund had 30,000 members in Russia, compared to 300,000 members in the Zionist movement, which was the largest of the Jewish political groups. About 10% of the members of in the Zionist movement were Marxist-Zionists. Joseph Stalin was the first People's Commissariat of Nationalities and in this role suppressed the Bund. Bundists supportive of the Bolsheviks formed short-lived Kombund (Communist Bund) parties (such as the Jewish Communist Labour Bund (Ukraine) and Jewish Communist Labour Bund in Poland) or joined the Yevsektsia, a Jewish section of the Bolshevik organization created by Stalin which worked to end Jewish communal and religious life, while anti-Communist social democrats maintained independent Bund structures, especially in Poland.

Members of the Marxist Zionist movement, Poale Zion led by Ber Borochov, returned to Russia (from Palestine) and requested to form Jewish Brigades within the Red Army. Trotsky supported the request but opposition from the Yevsektsiya led to the proposal's failure. Poale Zion eventually split between a pro-Communist "Left", and an anti-Communist "Right". Future Israeli Prime Minister Ben-Gurion was a member of the Israeli branch of the latter, forming Ahdut HaAvoda (the ancestor of the Israeli Labor Party) in 1919.

In 1921, following a personal request to Stalin by the Soviet author Maxim Gorky, the Hebrew poets Bialik and Shaul Tchernichovsky were allowed to emigrate to Palestine. Bialik became the Israeli national poet. Despite opposition from the Evsektsiya, Stalin also permitted funding of a Hebrew theatre troupe in Moscow, called Habima. Konstantin Stanislavski attended the first night and the group put on a historic play called The Dybbuk, which they were allowed to take on tour in Europe. The tour terminated in Tel Aviv, and Habima never returned to Moscow, becoming instead the Israel National Theatre. The Revolution was accompanied by a brief flowering of Yiddish arts before being decimated by censorship and by 1950 a significant number of prominent Yiddish intellectuals had been sent to the Gulag. A Soviet census found that 90% of Belarusian Jews and 76% of Ukrainian Jews gave Yiddish as their mother tongue.

Between 1922 and 1928, the Soviets embarked on a plan of moving Ukrainian Jews to agricultural communes, mainly in Crimea. The plan was encouraged by donations from US Jewish charities trying to protect and help Jews. A number of Zionist agricultural collectives were established in Crimea in preparation for Kibbutz life. Soviet leader Mikhail Kalinin considered creating a Jewish state in Crimea which had a large Karaite population who had been exempt from Tsarist persecution. (Karaites are Jews who reject the authority of the Talmud.)

In 1924 Stalin became the ruler of the USSR. In 1928 a Jewish Autonomous Oblast was created in the Russian Far East with Yiddish as an official language and Hebrew was outlawed: The only language to be outlawed in the USSR. Few Jews were tempted by the Soviet Jewish Republic and as of 2002 Jews constitute only about 1.2% of its population.

The Yevsektsiyas were disbanded in 1927 and many their leaders perished during the Great Purge. The Bund survived in independent Poland until the Second World War, when its membership was exterminated by the Nazis.

== King–Crane Commission ==
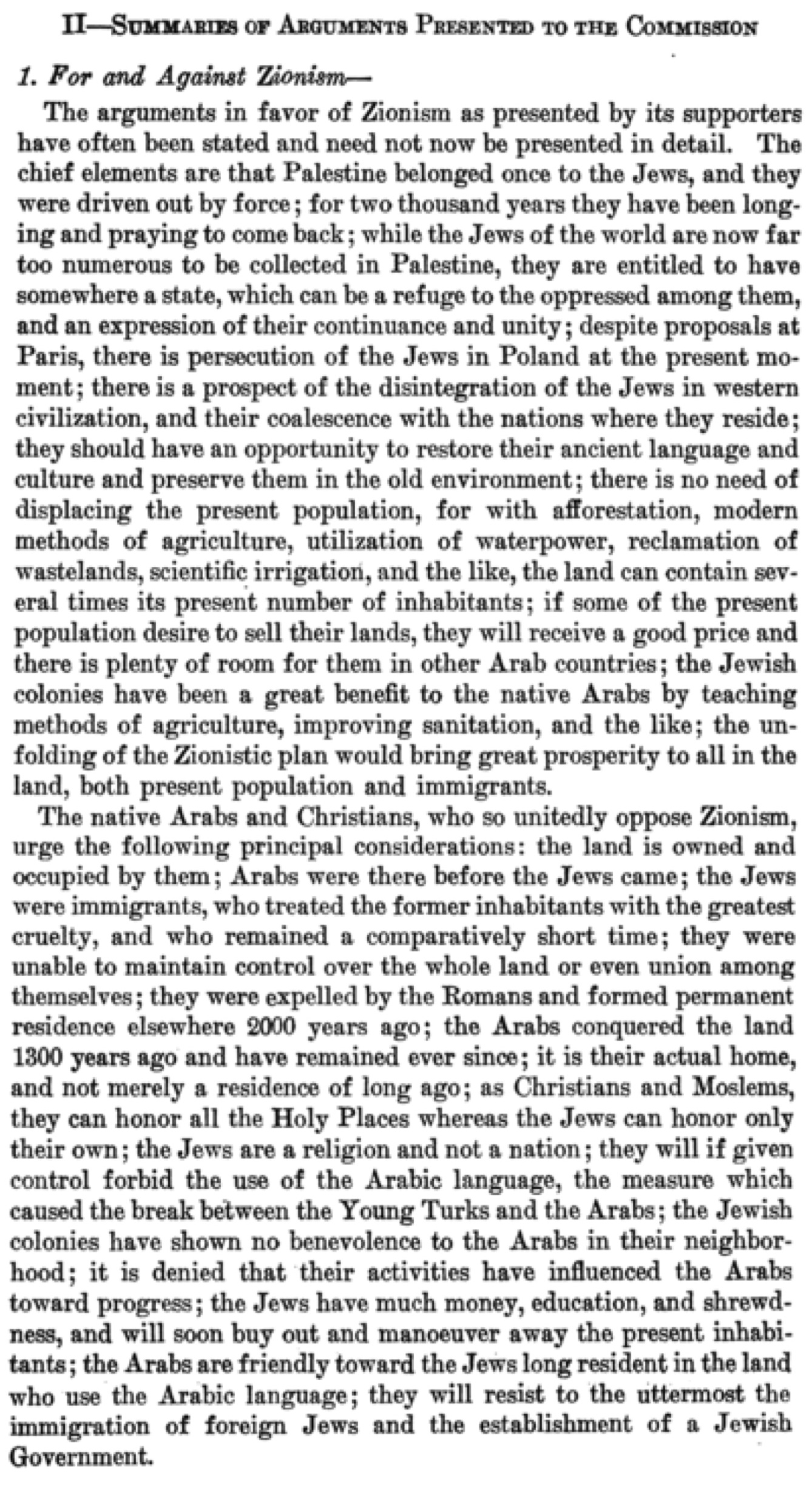
During the 1919 Paris Peace Conference, an Inter-Allied Commission was sent to Palestine to assess the views of the local population; the report summarized the arguments received from petitioners for and against Zionism.

In 1919, the US-based King–Crane Commission was sent to Palestine with the intention of meeting with the local population and documenting their wishes, in accordance with the goal of self-determination. Initially the mission started with a strongly sympathetic disposition towards Zionism but concluded that:

If that principle is to rule, and so the wishes of Palestine's population are to be decisive as to what is to be done with Palestine, then it is to be remembered that the non-Jewish population of Palestine – nearly nine-tenths of the whole – are emphatically against the entire Zionist programme. The tables show that there was no one thing upon which the population of Palestine were more agreed than upon this.

These maximum Zionist demands implied subjection of Palestinians to Jewish rule, with the commission finding that this was a violation of the principle of self-determination, given the anti-Zionist sentiment of the non-Jewish population.

The report stated that "The initial claim, often submitted by Zionist representatives, that they have a 'right' to Palestine based on occupation of two thousand years ago, can barely be seriously considered." Consequently, it recommended a considerably "modified" or "reduced" version of the Zionist programme, with Palestine as a Jewish national home but not a Jewish state.

Instead, Palestinian Arabs overwhelmingly desired an independent Arab nation, or, failing that, an American protectorate. However, the Woodrow Wilson administration was hesitant to go against previous agreements between Britain and France, and did not publish the King–Crane report until 1922, after the end of the Paris Peace Conference.

== Churchill White Paper ==
In June 1922, in response to the 1921 Jaffa riots, the Churchill White Paper was drafted at the request of Winston Churchill, then Secretary of State for the Colonies. Churchill stated that the goal of the white paper was "…to make it clear that the establishment of self-governing institutions in Palestine was to be subordinated to the paramount pledge and obligation of establishing a Jewish National Home in Palestine".

The "British Policy in Palestine", which was included as a part of the white paper, was accepted by the Zionist Organization and rejected by the Palestinians. Shortly thereafter, the House of Lords rejected a Palestine Mandate that incorporated the Balfour Declaration by 60 votes to 25.

== Beginning of Revisionist Zionism ==
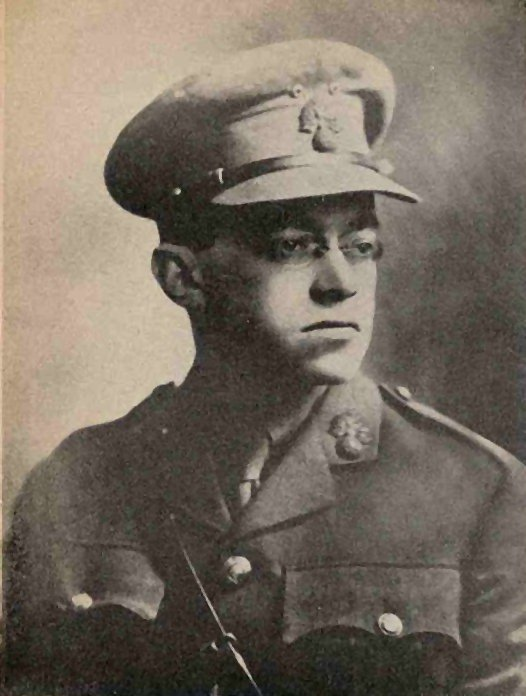
Ze'ev Jabotinsky, the founder and first leader of Betar, shown here in Jewish Legion uniform.

Ze'ev Jabotinsky founded the Revisionist Party in 1925, which took on a more militant ethos and openly maximalist agenda than Weizmann and Ben-Gurion. Jabotinsky rejected Weizmann's strategy of incremental state building, instead preferring to immediately declare sovereignty over the entire region, which extended to both the East and West bank of the Jordan river. Like Weizmann and Herzl, Jabotinsky also believed that the support of a Great Power was essential to the success of Zionism. From early on, Jabotinsky openly rejected the possibility of a "voluntary agreement" with the Arabs of Palestine. He instead believed in building an "iron wall" of Jewish military force to break Arab resistance to Zionism, at which point an agreement could be established. Jabotinsky's "iron wall" strategy would have a lasting effect on the Zionist perspective towards the demographic problem posed by the presence of the local Palestinian population. Both the left and right factions of Zionism would rely on this strategy of leveraging military strength in pursuit of political aspirations.

== British Mandate and development of the Zionist quasi-state ==
=== A greater Arab kingdom ===
In the first meeting in June 1918 between Weizmann and the Hashemite Emir Faisal, Weizmann had assured Faisal that:

"the Jews did not propose to set up a government of their own but wished to work under British protection, to colonize and develop Palestine without encroaching on any legitimate interests"

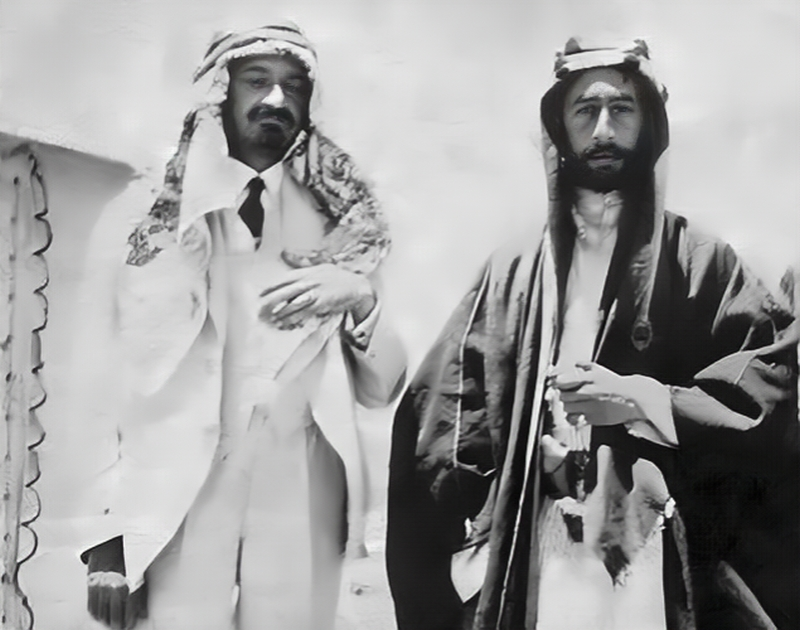
Emir Faisal I and Chaim Weizmann (left, wearing Arab headdress as a sign of friendship) in 1918 in Transjordan

In 1919 Faisal, signed the Faisal–Weizmann Agreement. Faisal met with Felix Frankfurter, president of the Zionist Organization of America, which was followed by T. E. Lawrence drafting of a letter to Frankfurter, on 3 March 1919, signed by Faisal, which stated:

"The Arabs, especially the educated among us, look with the deepest sympathy on the Zionist movement. Our deputation here in Paris is fully acquainted with the proposals (Note: Part of the proposals submitted by the Zionist Organization to the Peace Conference on 3 February were: "The boundaries of Palestine shall follow the general lines set out below: Starting on the North at a point on the Mediterranean Sea in the vicinity South of Sidon and following the watersheds of the foothills of the Lebanon as far as Jisr el Karaon, thence to El Bire following the dividing line between the two basins of the Wadi El Korn and the Wadi Et Teim thence in a southerly direction following the dividing line between the Eastern and Western slopes of the Hermon, to the vicinity West of Beit Jenn, thence Eastward following the northern watersheds of the Nahr Mughaniye close to and west of the Hedjaz Railway. In the East a line close to and West of the Hedjaz Railway terminating in the Gulf of Akaba. In the South a frontier to be agreed upon with the Egyptian Government. In the West the Mediterranean Sea. The details of the delimitations, or any necessary adjustments of detail, shall be settled by a Special Commission on which there shall be Jewish representation.") submitted yesterday by the Zionist Organization to the Peace Conference, and we regard them as moderate and proper."

Frankfurter replied on 5 March "..These aims are now before the Peace Conference as definite proposals by the Zionist Organisation. We are happy indeed that you consider these proposals 'moderate and proper,' and that we have in you a staunch supporter for their realisation."

After the war, the plan for a greater Arab kingdom under the Hashemite family was abandoned when Emir Faisal was expelled from Damascus by the French in 1920. In parallel, the Zionist demand for a clear British acknowledgment of the entirety of Palestine as the Jewish national home was rejected. Instead, Britain committed only to establishing a Jewish national home "in Palestine" and promised to facilitate this without prejudicing the rights of existing "non-Jewish communities"—these qualifying statements aroused the concern of Zionist leaders at the time.

Initially Palestinian Arabs looked to the Arab-nationalist leaders to create a single Arab state, however Faisal's agreement with Weizmann led Palestinian-Arabs to develop their own brand of nationalism and call for Palestine to become a state governed by the Arab majority, in particular they demanded an elected assembly.

Zionist supporters were by now aware of Arab opposition, and this led the movement in 1921 to pass a motion calling on the leadership to "forge a true understanding with the Arab nation".

=== The British mandate for Palestine ===
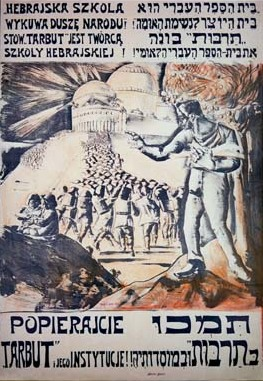
Poster from the Zionist Tarbut schools of Poland in the 1930s. Zionist parties were very active in Polish politics. In the 1922 Polish parliamentary election, Zionists held 24 seats of a total of 35 Jewish parliament members.

After the defeat and dismantling of the Ottoman Empire by European colonial powers in 1918, the League of Nations endorsed the full text of the Balfour Declaration and established the British Mandate for Palestine in 1922. The mandate privileged the Jewish minority over the Arab majority. In addition to declaring British support for the establishment of a "Jewish national home" in Palestine, the mandate included provisions facilitating Jewish immigration, and granting the Zionist movement the status of representing Jewish national interests. In particular, the Jewish Agency, the embodiment of the Zionist movement in Palestine, was made a partner of the mandatory government, acquiring international diplomatic status and representing Zionist interests before the League of Nations and other international venues.

In late 1921, the 12th Zionist congress was held in Carlsbad, Czechoslovakia; it was the first congress to be held since 1913, because of the First World War. Four hundred-fifty delegates attended, representing 780,000 fee paying Zionist members worldwide. Weizmann was elected its president in recognition of his role in obtaining the Balfour Declaration. The conference passed a proposal for an "Arab-Jewish Entente", which expressed delegates commitment "to attain a durable understanding which shall enable the Arab and Jewish peoples to live together in Palestine on terms of mutual respect and co-operate in making the common home into a flourishing community, the upbuilding of which will assure to each of these peoples an undisturbed national development". Weizmann led the movement until 1931. From 1931 to 1935 the WZO was presided by Nahum Sokolow (who had also spent the First World War in Britain). Weizmann resumed presidency of the WZO in 1935 and led it until 1946.

Zionist Congresses:

- 1929 16th Congress, Zurich: 604,000 fee paying members.
- 1931 17th Congress, Basel: 670,000 fee paying members.
- 1933 18th Congress, Prague: 828,000 fee paying members.

The British mandate effectively established a Jewish quasi-state in Palestine, lacking only full sovereignty. This lack of sovereignty was crucial for Zionism at this early stage, as the Jewish population was too small to defend itself against the Arabs of Palestine. The British presence provided a necessary safeguard for Jewish nationalism. To achieve political independence, Jews needed Britain's support, particularly in land purchase and immigration. Following the Balfour Declaration, Jewish immigration to Palestine grew. According to the Peel Report, 9,149 immigrants arrived in 1921, 33,801 in 1925, dropping to less than 3,000 in 1927 and in 1928, and rising dramatically after Hitler's seizure of control in Germany in 1933, with 61,854 arriving in 1935. By the end of the mandate period, the Jewish population in Palestine nearly tripled, eventually reaching one third of the country's population. In this period the Palestine Jewish Colonization Association, the Jewish National Fund and other Zionist organisations purchased land and started agricultural colonies, with 212,500 acres acquired between 1922 and 1932.

The nucleus of the Jewish quasi-state was the Histadrut, established in 1920 as an independent social, political and economic institution. The Histadrut also exercised significant control over the Haganah, a Jewish defense force formed in 1920 in reaction to Arab riots. Originally created to defend the community, Haganah evolved into a permanent underground reserve army fully integrated into the Jewish political structure. Although the British authorities disapproved of the Haganah, particularly its method of stealing arms from British bases, they did not disband it. The Histadrut operated as a completely independent entity, without interference from the British mandate authorities. Ben-Gurion saw the Histadrut's detachment from socialist ideology to be one of its key strengths; indeed it was the General Organisation of Workers in Israel. In particular, the Histadrut worked towards national unity and aimed to dominate the capitalist system en route to gaining political power, not to create a socialist utopia.

As secretary general of the Histadrut and leader of the Zionist labour movement, Ben-Gurion adopted similar strategies and objectives as Weizmann during this period, disagreeing primarily on issues of specific tactical moves up until 1939. The middle class grew dramatically in size with the arrival of the fourth aliyah in 1924, motivating a political shift within the labour movement. It was during this period that the political strategy of the labour movement would solidify. The founding of the Mapai party unified the labour movement, making it the dominant force. The party saw economic control as essential to facilitating Zionist settlement and achieving political power: "the economic question is not one of class; it is a national question". For Ben-Gurion, the transformation from "working class to nation" was intertwined with his rejection of diaspora life, as he would declare: the "weak, unproductive, parasitical Jewish masses" must be converted "to productive labor" in service of the nation.

Sara Roy argues that the mandatory administration implemented policies that favoured the development of the capitalist sector, predominantly associated with the Jewish community, while disadvantaging the Arab non-capitalist sector. Between 1933 and 1937, government spending was concentrated in two main areas—development and economic services, and defence—with the former focusing on infrastructural improvements (such as railways, roads, bridges, and other public works) that were particularly beneficial for capitalist production. In contrast to the Jewish population, according to Roy, the Arabs did not benefit from any government protections such as social security, employment benefits, trade union protection, job security and training opportunities. Arab wages were one third of their Jewish counterparts (including when paid by the same employer). The mandate also included an article describing self-governing institutions intended only for the Jewish population of Palestine. No similar support or recognition was provided to the Arab majority during the time of the mandate. By enabling the Zionist institutions to serve as a parallel government to the Mandate, Roy argues, the British facilitated the separation of the economy and legitimised their quasi-state status. Accordingly, these institutions, which purported to act in the interests of Jews everywhere, were able to funnel resources into the Jewish sector in Palestine, heavily subsidising the dominant Jewish economy.

The 1933 Haavara Agreement (Hebrew: הסכם העברה, lit. 'transfer agreement') was an arrangement made between the economic authorities of Nazi Germany on one side and the Zionist Federation of Germany and the Anglo-Palestine Bank (under the directive of the Jewish Agency) to facilitate the eventual migration of approximately 60,000 German Jews to Palestine between 1933 and 1939.

=== Zionist paramilitaries in Palestine ===
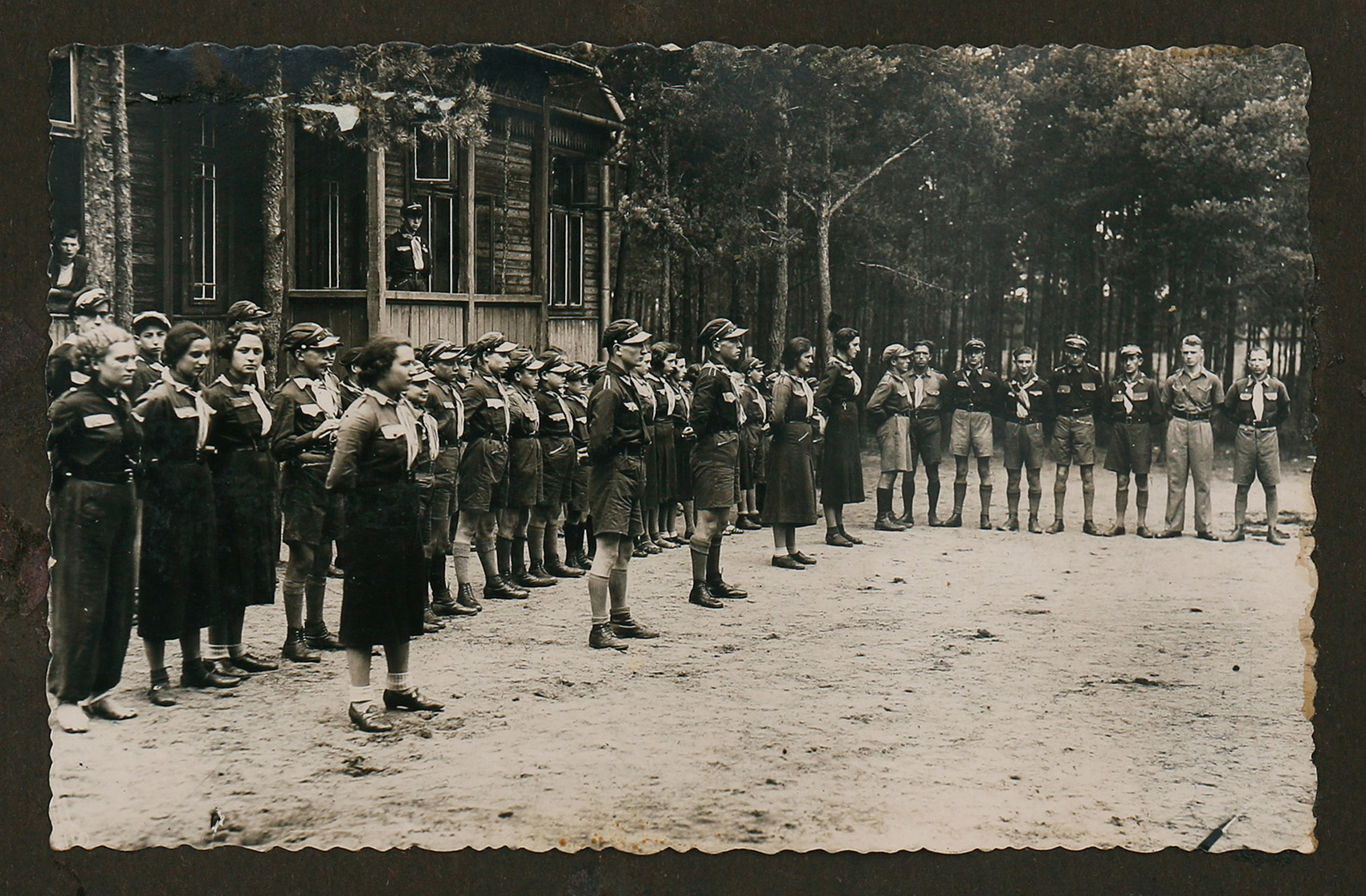
Members of Betar movement at a summer camp in the Polish resort town Zakopane in 1935

The Haganah (Hebrew: הַהֲגָנָה, lit. The Defence) was the main Zionist paramilitary organisation of the Yishuv in Mandatory Palestine from 1920. The first head of the Haganah was a 28-year-old named Yosef Hecht, a veteran of the Jewish Legion.

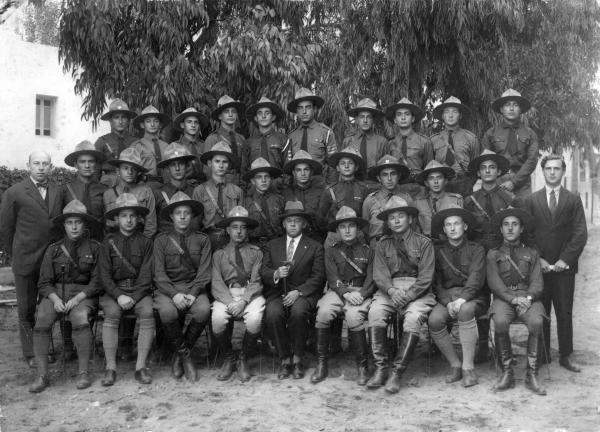
Ze'ev Jabotinsky in the company of Betar commanders, Palestine

Betar was founded by Ze'ev Jabotinsky at a meeting of Jewish youth in Riga, Latvia, arranged by Aron Propes in 1923. Jabotinsky spoke of the Arab attacks on the settlement of Tel Hai and other Jewish settlements in the Galilee. He believed that these incidents, indicative of serious threats to the Jewish Palestinians, could only be addressed by the recreation of the ancient Jewish state of Israel, extending across the entirety of both Palestine and Jordan. This is the defining philosophy of Revisionist Zionism. Jabotinsky proposed creating Betar to foster a new generation of Jews thoroughly indoctrinated in these nationalist ideals and trained for military action against all enemies of Judaism. In 1931, Jabotinsky was elected rosh Betar ("head of Betar") at the first world conference in Danzig.

The name Betar (Hebrew: בית"ר) refers to both the last Jewish fort to fall in the Bar Kokhba revolt (136 CE) and to the altered abbreviation of the Hebrew name of the organisation, "Berit Trumpeldor" or "Brit Yosef Trumpeldor" (Hebrew: ברית יוסף תרומפלדור). Although Trumpeldor's name is properly spelt with tet (ט), it was written with taf (ת) so as to produce the acronym.

In 1934, Poland was home to 40,000 of Betar's 70,000 members. Routine Betar activities in Warsaw included military drilling, instruction in Hebrew, and encouragement to learn English. Militia groups organised by Betar Poland helped to defend against attacks by the anti-Semitic ONR. The interwar Polish government helped Betar with military training. Some members admired the Polish nationalist camp and imitated some of its aspects. Throughout the 1930s and early 1940s, Betar aided the widespread immigration of Jews to Palestine in violation of the British Mandate's immigration quotas, which had not been increased despite the surge of refugees from the Nazi persecution and murder of Jews. In total, Betar was responsible for the entrance of over 40,000 Jews into Palestine under such restrictions.

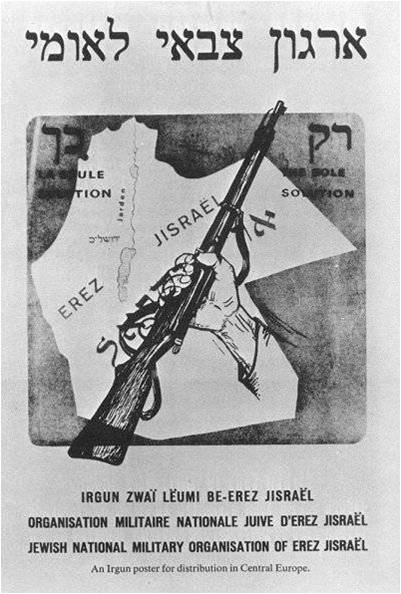
An Irgun poster from 1931 showing a map labelled "Land of Israel" covering the borders of both Mandatory Palestine and the Emirate of Transjordan, which the Irgun claimed in their entirety for a future Jewish state.

In 1931, an offshoot of the Haganah was formed, called the Irgun (Hebrew: ארגון; full title: Hebrew: הארגון הצבאי הלאומי בארץ ישראל Hā-ʾIrgun Ha-Tzvaʾī Ha-Leūmī b-Ērētz Yiśrāʾel, lit. "The National Military Organisation in the Land of Israel"), or Etzel (Hebrew: אצ"ל). The Irgun has been viewed as a terrorist organisation or organisation which carried out terrorist acts. The Irgun policy was based on Revisionist Zionism, the ideology of Ze'ev Jabotinsky. According to Howard Sachar, "The policy of the new organisation was based squarely on Jabotinsky's teachings: every Jew had the right to enter Palestine; only active retaliation would deter the Arabs; only Jewish armed force would ensure the Jewish state". The organisation committed acts of terrorism against the British, whom it regarded as illegal occupiers, and against Arabs. In particular the Irgun was described as a terrorist organisation by the United Nations, British, and United States governments; in media such as The New York Times newspaper; as well as by the Anglo-American Committee of Inquiry, the 1946 Zionist Congress and the Jewish Agency. However, academics such as Bruce Hoffman and Max Abrahms have written that the Irgun went to considerable lengths to avoid harming civilians, such as issuing pre-attack warnings; according to Hoffman, Irgun leadership urged "targeting the physical manifestations of British rule while avoiding the deliberate infliction of bloodshed." Albert Einstein, in a letter to the New York Times in 1948, compared Irgun and its successor Herut party to "Nazi and Fascist parties" and described it as a "terrorist, right wing, chauvinist organization". Irgun's tactics appealed to many Jews who believed that any action taken in the cause of the creation of a Jewish state was justified, including terrorism.

=== Palestinian nationalism and national leadership ===
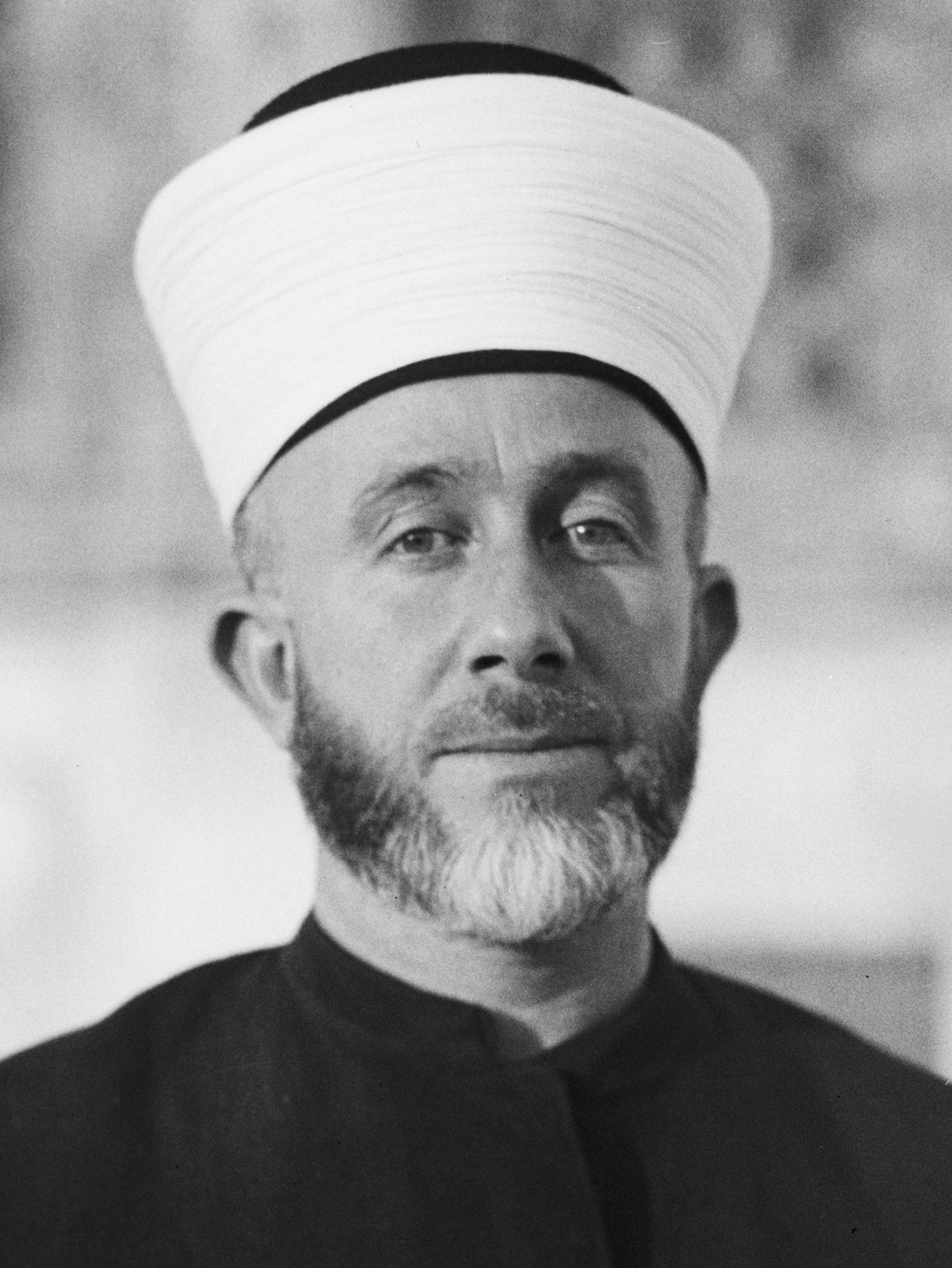
Amin al-Husseini in 1929

According to James L. Gelvin, "Palestinian nationalism emerged in the interwar period in response to Zionist immigration and settlement." The first organisational vehicle of this movement was the Muslim-Christian Associations, political clubs established in the aftermath of the British defeat of the Ottoman army and their establishment of a military government in Palestine in 1918. The MCO soon formed a national body, the Palestine Arab Congress, which tried to influence the developing British policy in Palestine and counter the influence of the Zionist Commission which visited Palestine in April 1918. The main platform of these groups were independence, opposition to the Balfour Declaration and the idea of a Jewish National Home in Palestine, as well as opposition to mass Jewish immigration.

The British had created the role of Grand Mufti of Jerusalem in 1918, expanding the mufti's remit from just the district of Jerusalem, to all Islamic community matters and institutions across Mandatory Palestine. In 1921, Mohammad Amin al-Husseini was appointed to this role by the Palestine High Commissioner Herbert Samuel. Samuel also created a Supreme Muslim Council in 1921, of which al-Husseini was elected president. Prior to 1936, al-Husseini, while opposed to Zionism, sought a negotiated solution to the level of new Jewish immigration into Mandatory Palestine, believing that the British authorities would protect the rights and interests of non-Jewish Palestinians. During the following decades, he became the focus of Palestinian opposition to Zionism.

== Zionist policies and the 1936–1939 Arab Revolt ==
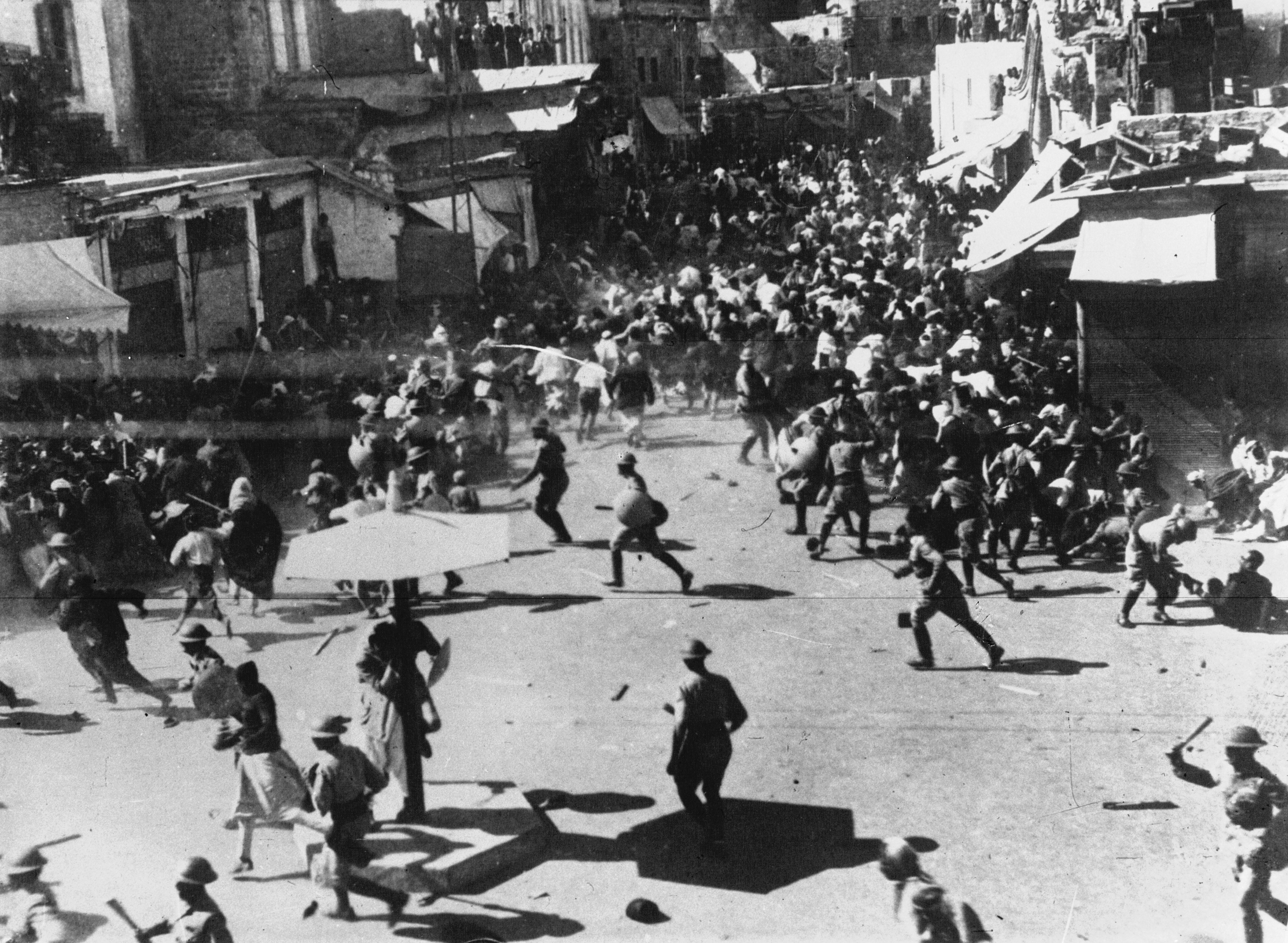
British policemen disperse an Arab mob during the Jaffa riots in April 1936 (The Illustrated London News, 13 June 1936)

For the Zionist movement, economic development and policies were a mechanism by which political aims could be achieved. A new economic sector exclusively for Jews, controlled by the labour Zionist movement, was established with support from the Jewish National Fund and the agricultural workers' Histadrut. Despite the universalist ideals of Zionist pioneering, this new Jewish economic sector was fundamentally based on exclusionary practices. The goal of achieving "100 percent of Hebrew labour" was the primary driver of the territorial, economic and social separation between Jews and Arabs.

The Zionist economic platform was partially based on the assumption (eventually demonstrated incorrect) that economic benefits to the Arabs of Palestine would pacify opposition to the movement. For the Zionist leadership, the economic status and development of the Arabs of Palestine should be compared with Arabs of other countries, rather than with the Jews of Palestine. Accordingly, disproportionate gains in Jewish development were acceptable as long as the status of the Arab sector did not worsen. While British support for Zionist aspirations in Palestine established the parameters within which the Arab economy could develop, Zionist policies reinforced these limitations. Most notable are the exclusion of Arab labour from Jewish enterprise and the expulsion of Arab peasants from Jewish-owned land. Both of these had limited impact in scope but reinforced the structural limitations put in place by British policies.

With the rise to power of the Nazis in 1933, the Jewish community was increasingly persecuted and driven out. This "toughened the Zionist position vis-à-vis the Arab and British positions", according to Pappé, with Ben-Gurion writing in his diaries that "settlement and, when circumstances would allow it, the transfer of the indigenous population would ensure the realization of the Zionist dream." Additionally, the discriminatory immigration laws of the US, UK and other countries preferable to German Jews led to more than 60,000 Jews arriving in Palestine in 1935 alone. Ben-Gurion would go on to write in what became known as the 1937 Ben-Gurion letter that a high rate of immigration would allow for the maximalist Zionist goal of a Jewish state in all of Palestine. (Note: Letter as translated by the Journal of Palestine Studies) The Arab community openly pressured the mandatory government to restrict Jewish immigration and land purchases.

Sporadic attacks in the countryside (described by Zionists and the British as "banditry") reflected widespread anger over the Zionist land purchases that displaced local peasants. Meanwhile, in urban areas, protests against British rule and the increasing influence of the Zionist movement intensified and became more militant in the early 1930s.

The outbreak of violence in the course of the 1936 Arab Revolt was a turning point in Jewish-Arab relations, unifying previously divided factions within the Zionist movement and leading them to view the use of force as a necessary means of defense and deterrence.

During the revolt, the Irgun Zvai Leumi engaged in the use of terror attacks against the Arabs of Palestine. Similarly, for the labour Zionist Palmach, the lines delineating what was acceptable and unacceptable while dealing with Arab villagers were "vague and intentionally blurred". These ambiguous limits practically did not differ from those of the self-described "terrorist" group, Irgun. According to Anita Shapira, beginning in this period, labour Zionism's use of violence against Palestinians for political means was essentially the same as that of radical conservative Zionist groups.

== The Peel Commission partition proposal ==
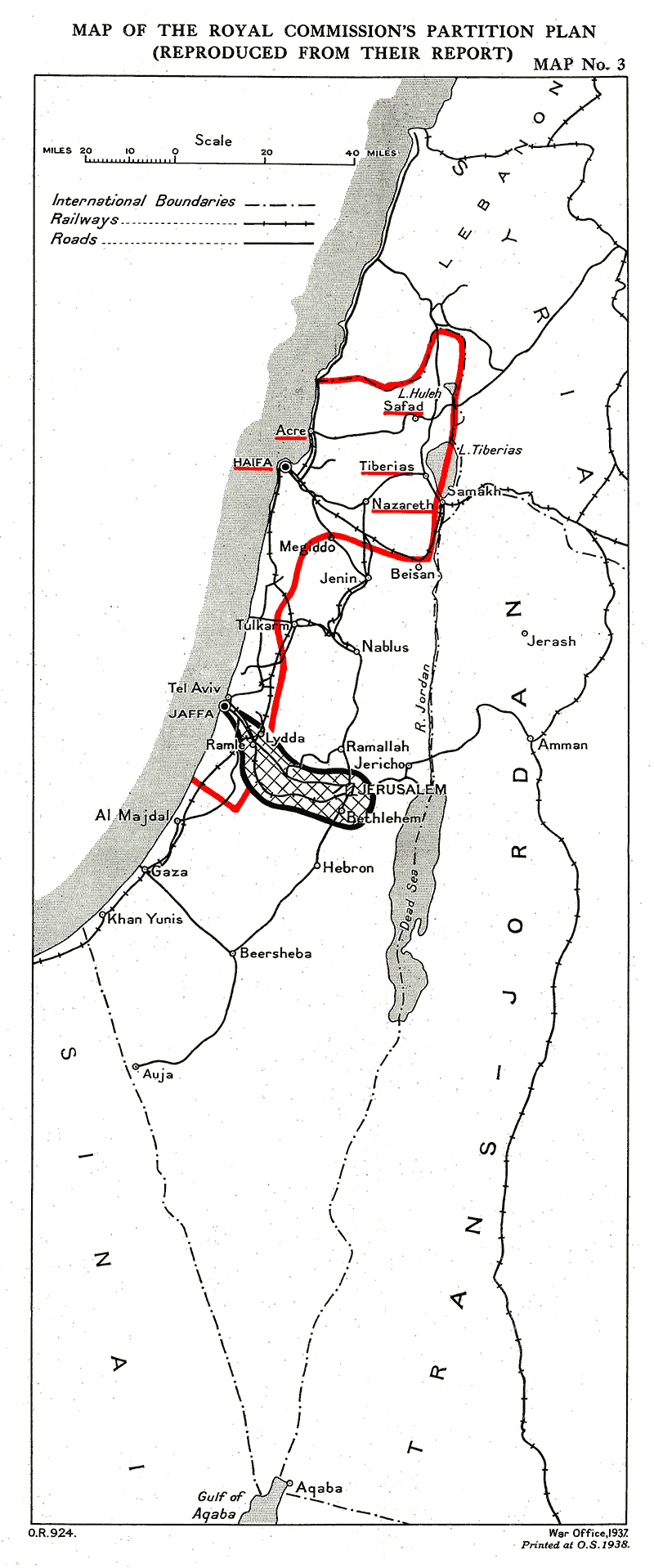
Provisional frontiers of the Palestine partition from the Peel Commission

In response to the revolt, the British appointed in 1937 a commission of inquiry that eventually recommended the partition of the land. The proposal included creating a small Jewish state occupying 17 percent of Mandatory Palestine's territory, while Jerusalem and a corridor to the sea would remain under British control, and the remaining 75 percent of the territory would form a Palestinian state connected to Transjordan under King Abdullah's rule. At this point, Jews owned 5.6% of the land in Palestine; the land allocated to the Jewish state would contain 40 percent of the country's fertile land. The commission also proposed a population transfer of the Palestinian Arabs from the areas designated for the Jewish state, based on the precedent of the 1923 Greek-Turkish population exchange. For Ben-Gurion, the transfer proposal was the most appealing recommendation put forward by the commission. Indeed, this sentiment was deeply ingrained to the extent that Ben Gurion's acceptance of partition was contingent upon the removal of the Palestinian population.

The Zionist leadership viewed the mass transfer of the Arabs as morally permissible, but were unsure of its political effectiveness. Various Zionist leaders spoke in strong support of the transfer plan, asserting that there is nothing immoral about it. (Note: Various leaders spoke strongly in favour of transfer. Ussishkin said, "We cannot start the Jewish state with ... half the population being Arab ... Such a state cannot survive even half an hour." There was nothing immoral about transferring sixty thousand Arab families: "It is most moral.... I am ready to come and defend ... it before the Almighty." Ruppin said: "I do not believe in the transfer of individuals. I believe in the transfer of entire villages." Berl Katznelson, coleader with Ben-Gurion of Mapai, said the transfer would have to be by agreement with Britain and the Arab states: "But the principle should be that there must be a large agreed transfer." Ben-Gurion summed up: "With compulsory transfer we [would] have a vast area [for settlement] .... I support compulsory transfer. I don't see anything immoral in it.") Within the Zionist movement, two perspectives developed with respect to the partition proposal; the first was a complete rejection of partition, the second was acceptance of the idea of partition on the basis that it would eventually allow for expansion to all territories within "the boundaries of Zionist aspirations." It was the right wing of the Zionist movement that put forward the main arguments against transfer, with Jabotinsky strongly objecting it on moral grounds, and others mainly focusing on its impracticality. However, in his last book "The Jewish War Front" published in 1940, after the outbreak of WWII, Jabotinsky no longer ruled out the possibility of voluntary population transfer, though he still didn't view it as a necessary solution. Some leaders, such as Ruppin, Motzkin, and writers such as Israel Zangwill, also referred to transfer as a "voluntary" action that would include some form of compensation. However, "Palestine's Arabs did not wish to evacuate the land of their ancestors... The matter raised ethical questions that troubled the Yishuv". The revolt was inflamed by the partition proposal and continued until 1939 when it was forcefully suppressed by the British.

Later, Ze'ev Jabotinsky drew inspiration from the Nazi demographic policies that resulted in the expulsion of 1.5 million Poles and Jews, in whose place Germans resettled. In Jabotinsky's assessment:

The world has become accustomed to the idea of mass migrations and has almost become fond of them. Hitler—as odious as he is to us—has given this idea a good name in the world.

By the time of the 1936 Arab revolt, almost all groups within the Zionist movement wanted a Jewish state in Palestine, "whether they declared their intent or preferred to camouflage it, whether or not they perceived it as a political instrument, whether they saw sovereign independence as the prime aim, or accorded priority to the task of social construction". The main debates within the movement at this time were concerning partition of Palestine and the nature of the relationship with the British. The intensity of the revolt, Britain's ambiguous support for the movement and the increasing threat against European Jewry during this period motivated the Zionist leadership to prioritise immediate considerations. The movement ultimately favoured the notion of partition, primarily out of practical considerations and partially out of a belief that establishing a Jewish state over all of Palestine would remain an option. At the 1937 Zionist congress, the Zionist leadership adopted the stance that the land allocated to the Jewish state by the partition plan was inadequate—effectively rejecting the partition plan that faded away in the face of both Arab and Zionist opposition.

In response to Ben-Gurion's 1938 quote that "politically we are the aggressors and they [the Palestinians] defend themselves", Israeli historian Benny Morris says, "Ben-Gurion, of course, was right. Zionism was a colonizing and expansionist ideology and movement", and that "Zionist ideology and practice were necessarily and elementally expansionist." Morris describes the Zionist goal of establishing a Jewish state in Palestine as necessarily displacing and dispossessing the Arab population.

== Nazism, World War II and the Holocaust ==
=== Rise of the Nazis ===
While Nazi authorities didn't support a Jewish State, they saw Jewish emigration as beneficial to their early attempts for the expulsion of German Jews. This saw Nazis favouring Zionist organisations over other Jewish organisations.

Nazis also saw Zionist ideas and rhetoric as justifying Nazi anti-assimilation laws. With the Nazi diplomat Vicco von Bülow-Schwante stating that "there exists no reason to paralyse Zionist tendencies in Germany because Zionism does not contradict the National Socialist goal of gradually eliminating the Jews from Germany." Reinhard Heydrich ordered in 1935 the prohibition of speeches who advised Jews to remain in Germany. Zionism and emigration narratives were promoted by the SS. This was exemplified in how although Jews were excluded from the Nazi film industry, the Zionist Union of Germany was allowed to organise segregated production and distribution outlets, by the German Propaganda Ministry.

Even if Nazi attitude towards Zionism were favourable, it was contradictory, as the economic restrictions imposed on Jews prevented the opportunity for many to emigrate. Adolf Eichmann visited Palestine in 1937 for illegal immigration mediations with Haganah Zionists but they were cut off by British authorities.

=== 1939 White Paper and the British rift with Zionism ===
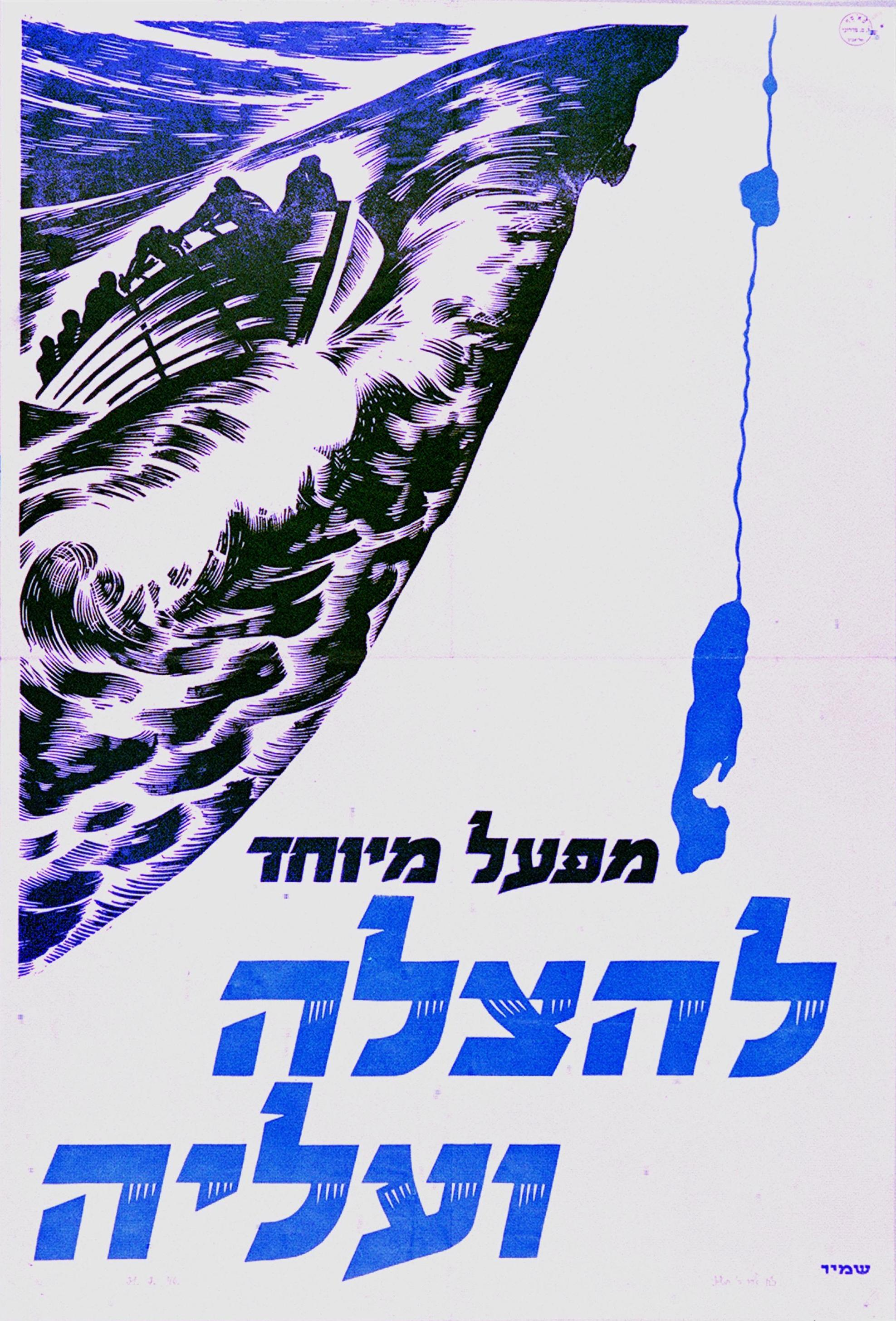
Poster calling for rescue and Jewish immigration to Palestine in 1940

In 1939, a British White Paper recommended limiting Jewish immigration and land purchase with the objective of maintaining the status quo while the threat of war loomed in Europe. The immigration was to be limited to no more than 75,000 people over the next five years. With Nazi expansionism in Europe, the limits on immigration prompted further militarisation, land takeover and illegal immigration efforts by the Zionist movement. World War II broke out as the Zionists were developing their campaign against the White Paper—unable to accept the White Paper or to side against the British, the Zionist movement would ultimately support the British war effort while working to upend the White Paper. (Note: David Ben Gurion famously would say: we shall "fight the White Paper as if there were no Hitler and fight Hitler as if there were no White Paper.") From the start of the second world war, the Zionists pressured the British to organise and train a Jewish "army", culminating in the establishment of a Jewish Brigade and accompanying blue and white flag. The development of this force would further train and enable the already substantial Zionist military capacity. The Haganah was allowed by the British to openly acquire weapons and worked with the British to prepare for a possible Axis invasion.

Despite the White Paper, Zionist immigration and settlement efforts continued during the war period. While immigration had previously been selective, once the details of the Holocaust reached Palestine in 1942, selectivity was abandoned. The official Zionist movement's war effort focused on the survival and development of the Yishuv; Pappe argues that scarce Zionist energy was deployed in support of European Jews. Many of those fleeing Nazi terror in Europe preferred to leave for the United States, however, strict American immigration policies and Zionist efforts led to 10% of the 3 million Jews leaving Europe to settle in Palestine.

During this time, the British were concerned about maintaining Arab support as Italian Fascist and German Nazi propaganda was targeting the Arab world, and gaining support. Whereas Jewish support in the fight against fascism was guaranteed. As a result, the British promised the Arabs in British territory independence by 1949 and imposed restrictions on land purchases by Jews.

=== Zionist movement on the eve of World War II ===
In 1938–1939 the Zionist movement had 1,040,540 members in 61 countries, while the total world Jewish population at this time was about 16 million.

Members and delegates at the 1939 Zionist congress, per country
Country	Members	Delegates
Poland	299,165	109
United States	263,741	114
Palestine	167,562	134
Romania	60,013	28
United Kingdom	23,513	15
South Africa	22,343	14
Canada	15,220	8

Delegates per political party at the 1939 Zionist congress
Party	Number	Percentage
Worker's Party	216	41
General Zionists (centre)	143	27
General Zionists (conservative)	28	5
Mizrahi (Orthodox religious)	65	12
Radical Workers [far left]	3	2.5
State Party [right-wing]	8	1.5
Others	66	11

=== Zionism during the Holocaust ===
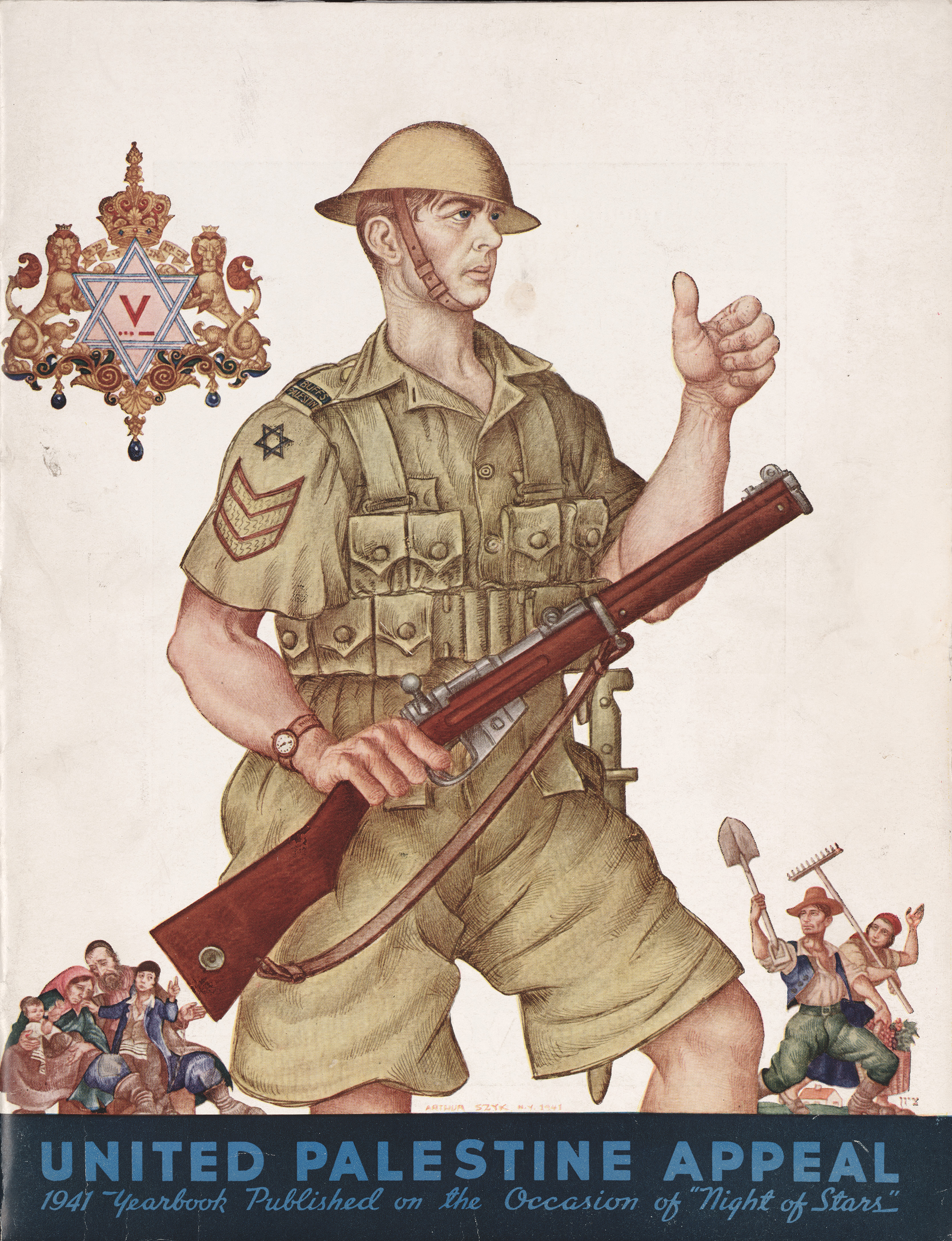
Poster by the United Palestine Appeal calling for Jewish mobilisation during World War II

In the Biltmore Conference of 1942, the Zionist movement would openly declare for the first time its goal of establishing a Jewish state in all of Palestine. At this point, the United States, with its growing economy and unprecedented military force, became a focal point of Zionist political activity that engaged with the American electorate and politicians. American President Truman supported the Biltmore Program for the duration of his time in office, largely motivated by humanitarian concerns and the growing influence of the Zionist lobby.

In response to the Biltmore Program, Judah Leon Magnes, Martin Buber, Ernst Simon and Henrietta Szold—former supporters of Brit Shalom—established Ihud (also spelled 'Ichud', Hebrew: איחוד, 'Unity'), a small Zionist political party founded by in 1942 advocating for an Arab–Jewish binational state rooted in equal political rights for Jews and Arabs in an undivided Palestine, calling this vision "political parity." It argued that Jewish immigration should be regulated in accordance with the principle of "numerical parity" with the Arabs and the ability of Palestine to absorb immigrants economically.

The Warsaw Ghetto Uprising of January and April 1943 included the participation of both right- and left-leaning Zionist organisations. Its commander, Mordechai Anielewicz, was a Socialist-Zionist and Zionists of all political spectra played a leading role in the struggle.

As the horrors of the Holocaust became known, the Zionist leadership formulated the One Million Plan, a reduction from Ben-Gurion's previous target of two million immigrants. Tom Segev states that Zionists in the old yishuv had not done enough in publicizing and trying to stop the Holocaust, and while they had succeeded in saving thousands of Jews by facilitating emigration to Mandatory Palestine, their focus was on state creation, and they had no power to "stop" the Holocaust. Following the end of the war, many stateless refugees, mainly Holocaust survivors, began migrating to Palestine in small boats in defiance of British rules. The Holocaust united much of the rest of world Jewry behind the Zionist project. The British either imprisoned these Jews in Cyprus or sent them to the British-controlled Allied Occupation Zones in Germany. The British, having faced Arab revolts, were now facing opposition by Zionist groups in Palestine for subsequent restrictions on Jewish immigration. In January 1946 the Anglo-American Committee of Inquiry, a joint British and American committee, was tasked to examine political, economic and social conditions in Mandatory Palestine and the well-being of the peoples now living there; to consult representatives of Arabs and Jews, and to make other recommendations 'as necessary' for an interim handling of these problems as well as for their eventual solution. Following the failure of the 1946–47 London Conference on Palestine, at which the United States refused to support the British, leading to both the Morrison–Grady Plan and the Bevin Plan being rejected by all parties, the British decided to refer the question to the UN on 14 February 1947. (Note: The reasons for this decision were explained by Ernest Bevin, then "His Majesty's Principal Secretary of State for Foreign Affairs" in a speech to the House of Commons on February 18, 1947, in which he said: "His Majesty's Government have been faced with an irreconcilable conflict of principles. There are in Palestine about 1,200,000 Arabs and 600,000 Jews. For the Jews the essential point of principle is the creation of a sovereign Jewish State. For the Arabs, the essential point of principle is to resist to the last establishment of Jewish sovereignty in any part of Palestine. The discussions of the last month have quite clearly shown that there is no prospect of resolving this conflict by any settlement negotiated between the parties. But if the conflict has to be resolved by an arbitrary decision, that is not a decision that His Majesty's Government are empowered, as Mandatory, to take. His Majesty's Government have of themselves no power, under the terms of the Mandate, to award the country either to the Arabs or to the Jews, or even to partition it between them.")

=== Saudi–U.S. correspondence on Arab–Jewish relations in Palestine ===
As the Second World War was drawing to its close, Ibn Saud, the king of Saudi Arabia, expressed his concern in a letter to US President Franklin D. Roosevelt lest the US support for Zionism will infringe on the rights of the Arabs of Palestine. On 5 April 1945, the President replied in a letter to the King that:

"I would take no action, in my capacity as Chief of the Executive Branch of this Government, which might prove hostile to the Arab people."

=== Rapid growth of illegal immigration to Palestine ===
Population of Palestine by ethno-religious groups, excluding nomads, from the 1946 Survey of Palestine
Year	Muslims	Jews	Christians	Others	Total Settled
1922	486,177 (74.9%)	83,790 (12.9%)	71,464 (11.0%)	7,617 (1.2%)	649,048
1931	693,147 (71.7%)	174,606 (18.1%)	88,907 (9.2%)	10,101 (1.0%)	966,761
1941	906,551 (59.7%)	474,102 (31.2%)	125,413 (8.3%)	12,881 (0.8%)	1,518,947
1946	1,076,783 (58.3%)	608,225 (33.0%)	145,063 (7.9%)	15,488 (0.8%)	1,845,559

In 1945, President Truman sent a personal representative, Earl G. Harrison, to investigate the situation of the Jewish survivors ("Sh'erit ha-Pletah") in Europe. Harrison reported that

substantial unofficial and unauthorized movements of people must be expected, and these will require considerable force to prevent, for the patience of many of the persons involved is, and in my opinion with justification, nearing the breaking point. It cannot be overemphasized that many of these people are now desperate, that they have become accustomed under German rule to employ every possible means to reach their end, and that the fear of death does not restrain them.

Despite winning the 1945 British election with a manifesto promising to create a Jewish state in Palestine, the Labour Government succumbed to Foreign Office pressure and kept Palestine closed to Jewish migration.

In Europe former Jewish partisans led by Abba Kovner began to organize escape routes ("Berihah") taking Jews from Eastern Europe down to the Mediterranean where the Jewish Agency organized ships ("Aliyah Bet") to illegally carry them to Palestine.

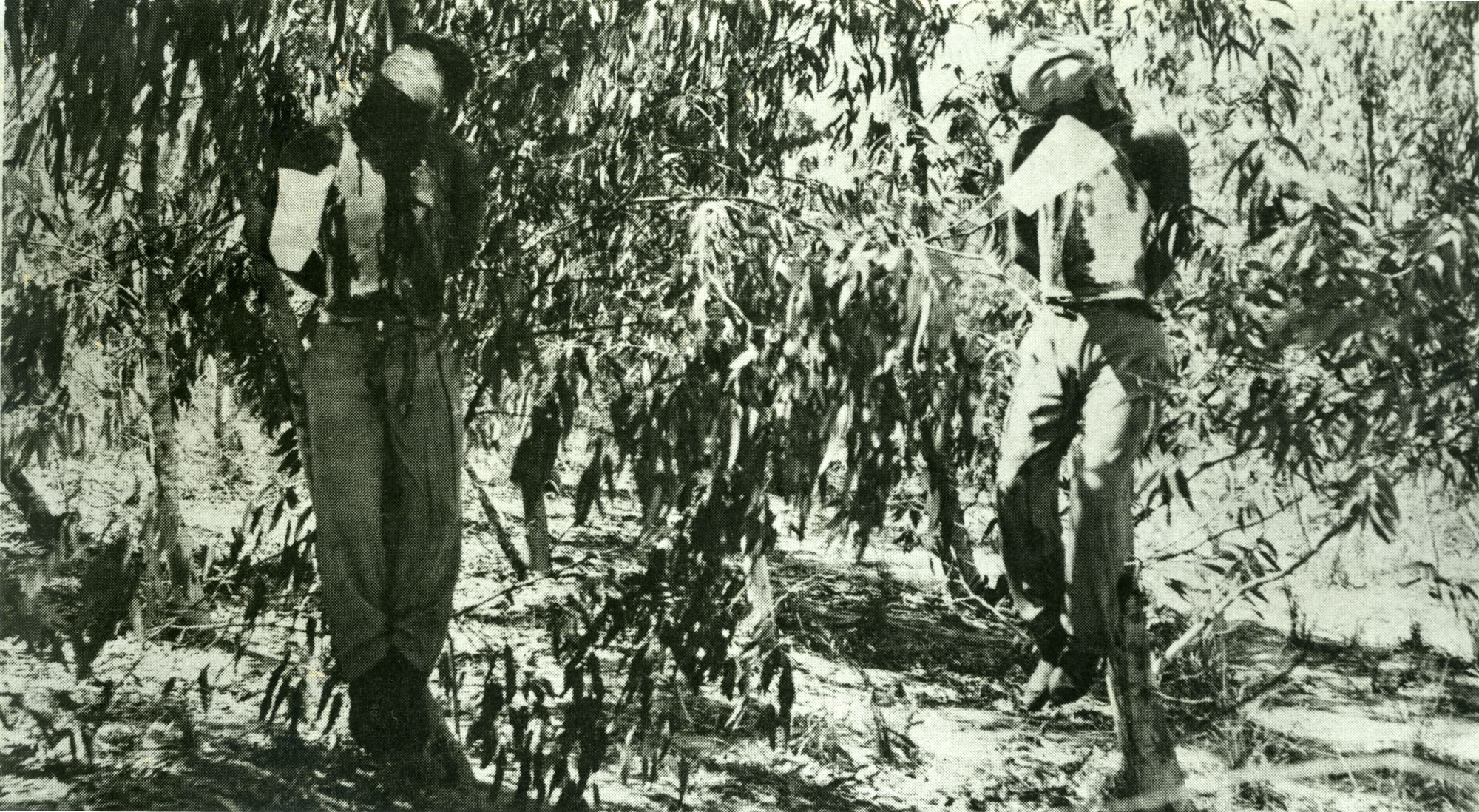
Two British sergeants hanged by the Irgun in 1947. From 1944–1948, Zionist paramilitary organizations conducted an insurgency in Mandatory Palestine.

The British government responded by trying to force Jews to return to their places of origin. Holocaust survivors entering the British Zone were denied assistance or forced to live in hostels with former Nazi collaborators (Britain gave asylum to a large number of Belarusian Nazi collaborators after the war). In American-controlled zones, political pressure from Washington allowed Jews to live in their own quarters and meant the US Army helped Jews trying to escape the centres of genocide.

Despite the death of almost a third of the world's Jews during the Second World War, the number of fee paying members of the Zionist movement continued to grow. The December 1946 Zionist congress in Basle (Switzerland) attracted 375 delegates from 43 countries representing two million fee paying members. As before the largest parties were the Socialist Zionist parties although these lacked a full majority. Only ten of the delegates were British Jews.

== End of the Mandate and expulsion of the Palestinians ==
A clickable map of Mandatory Palestine with the depopulated locations during the 1947–1949 Palestine war, remembered by Palestinians as the Nakba.

Towards the end of the war, the Zionist leadership was motivated more than ever to establish a Jewish state. Since the British were no longer sponsoring its development, many Zionists considered it would be necessary to establish the state by force by upending the British position in Palestine. In this the IRA's tactics against Britain in the Irish War of Independence served as a both a model and source of inspiration. (Note: "that a small, determined group of revolutionaries representing a minority view within the wider population could achieve some success against the British Empire helped to convince Zionist radicals that they could be successful. Members of Jewish underground groups . .studied Irish rebels' victory over the superior might of Britain. Ze'ev Jabotinsky, leader of the Irgun, had travelled to Ireland, meeting Irish Volunteer and IRA gunrunner Robert Briscoe, to discuss drilling, training and strategy in fighting the British and to 'learn all he could in order to form a physical force movement in Palestine on the same lines as the IRA'.") The Irgun, the military arm of the revisionist Zionists, and Lehi, who at one point sought an alliance with the Nazis, would lead a series of terrorist attacks against the British starting in 1944. This included the King David Hotel bombing, British immigration and tax offices and police stations. It was only by the war's end that the Haganah joined in the sabotage against the British. The combined impact of US opinion and the attacks on British presence eventually led the British to refer the situation to the United Nations in 1947. In response to a United Kingdom government request that the General Assembly "make recommendations under article 10 of the Charter, concerning the future government of Palestine", the United Nations Special Committee on Palestine (UNSCOP) was created on 15 May 1947.

The urgency of the condition of the Jewish refugees in Europe motivated the committee to unanimously vote in favour of terminating the British mandate in Palestine. The disagreement came with regards to whether Palestine should be partitioned or if it should constitute a federal state. American lobbying efforts, pressuring UN delegates with the threat of withdrawal of US aid, eventually secured the General Assembly votes in favour of the partition of Palestine into separate Jewish and Arab states, which was passed 29 November 1947.

Outbursts of violence slowly grew into a wider civil war between the Arabs and Zionist militias. By mid-December, the Haganah had shifted to a more "aggressive defense", abandoning notions of restraint it had espoused from 1936 to 1939. The Haganah reprisal raids were often disproportionate to the initial Arab offenses, which led to the spread of violence to previously unaffected areas. The Zionist militias, employed terror attacks against Arab civilian and militia centres and many Palestinians were evicted from their houses. In response, Arabs planted bombs in Jewish civilian areas, particularly in Jerusalem.

The first expulsion of Palestinians began 12 days after the adoption of the UN resolution, and the first Palestinian village was eliminated a month later, in retaliation for Palestinian attacks on convoys and Jewish settlements. In March 1948, Zionist forces began implementing Plan Dalet, an ethnic cleansing operation that involved the expulsion of civilians and the destruction of Arab towns and villages in pursuit of eliminating Palestinians seen as potentially hostile. According to Benny Morris, Zionist forces committed 24 massacres of Palestinians in the ensuing war, in part as a form of psychological warfare, the most notorious of which is the Deir Yassin massacre. The United Nations Conciliation Commission for Palestine estimated that between 1948 and 1949, 710,000 Palestinians were driven out of the country and another 40,000 were internally displaced, primarily as a result of these expulsions and massacres.

The British left Palestine (having done little to maintain order) on 14 May as planned. The British did not facilitate a formal transfer of power; a fully functioning Jewish quasi-state had already been operating under the British for the past several decades.

The same day, Ben-Gurion declared the establishment of the state of Israel. The Declaration of Independence of Israel described a democracy with equality of social and political rights for all citizens, and extended a peace offering to neighbouring states and their Arab citizens. As a result, many Zionist institutions became government institutions, and the four Zionist militias were combined to form the Israel Defense Forces. Ben White noted that the declaration states equality on the basis of citizenship but not nationality. (Note: White 2012, Spot the Difference: "In Israel, '"nationality" (Hebrew: le'um) and "citizenship" (Hebrew: ezrahut) are two separate, distinct statuses, conveying different rights and responsibilities'. Palestinians in Israel, as non-Jews, can be citizens, but never nationals, and are thus denied 'rights and privileges' enjoyed by those 'who would qualify for Israeli citizenship under the 1950 Law of Return'.")

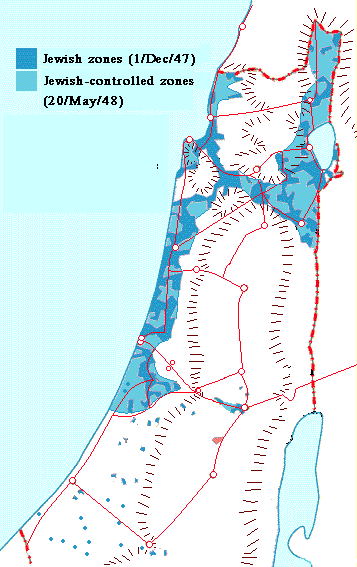
Zionist offensive Plan Dalet (1 April – 14 May, 1948; left) and Arab offensive (15 May – 10 June 1948; right) following the Declaration of the Establishment of the State of Israel on May 14 and the termination of the British Mandate for Palestine at midnight.

Following the declaration, the civil war in Mandatory Palestine escalated into the First Arab–Israeli War. Ben-Gurion referred to this war as the "war of sovereignty", while the newly established Israel Defense Forces referred to it as the "war of liberation". In 1949, Israel signed a series of armistices with the countries that made up the Arab League. The demarcations set out in these armistices saw Israel taking control of 78% of Mandatory Palestine, instead of the 55% outlined in the UN partition plan, and resulted in the destruction of much of Palestinian society and the Arab landscape. This war, led by the Zionist Yishuv, was framed by its leaders in biblical and messianic terms as a "miraculous clearing of the land", akin to the biblical War of Joshua. Nur Masalha writes that it is not clear who the Yishuv was declaring independence from, as it was neither from the British colonial rule, which facilitated Jewish settlement against Palestinian wishes, nor from the land's indigenous inhabitants, who had long cultivated and owned it. By the end of the war, 700-800,000 Palestinians – about half of Mandatory Palestine's predominantly Arab population – were displaced in total, and hundreds of villages were destroyed. The 1948 Palestinian expulsion and flight is known in the Palestinian historiography as the Nakba ("the catastrophe").

After the 1949 Armistice Agreements, a series of laws passed by the first Israeli government prevented displaced Palestinians from claiming private property or returning on the state's territories. They and many of their descendants remain refugees supported by UNRWA.

== See also ==
=== Types of Zionism ===
- Christian Zionism
- Cultural Zionism
- General Zionists
- Labor Zionism
- Reform Zionism
- Religious Zionism
- Revisionist Zionism

=== Zionist institutions and organizations ===
- Histadrut
- The Jewish Agency for Israel
- Am Yisrael Foundation
- Jewish National Fund
- Vaad Leumi
- World Zionist Organization

=== History of Zionism and the Israeli–Palestinian conflict ===
- History of Israel
- History of Palestine
- History of the Southern Levant
- Israeli–Palestinian conflict
- List of Zionist figures
- Timeline of Zionism

=== Related concepts ===
- Anti-Zionism
- Jewish Autonomism
- Jewish emancipation
- Yerida
