= Three-state solution =

Approach to the Israeli–Palestinian conflict

The three-state solution, also known as the Egyptian–Jordanian solution or the Jordan–Egypt option, is a proposed approach to resolving the Israeli–Palestinian conflict by returning administrative control of the West Bank to Jordan and the Gaza Strip to Egypt. This model seeks to revert to the territorial arrangements that existed before the 1967 Six-Day War.

== History ==
The three-state solution mirrors the geopolitical situation that existed between the 1949 Armistice Agreements and the 1967 Six-Day War. During this period, Egypt occupied the Gaza Strip, while Jordan administered the West Bank, with no independent Palestinian Arab state in existence. In 1950, Jordan formally annexed the West Bank and extended Jordanian citizenship to its Arab residents.

== Feasibility ==
Although the two-state solution remains the most widely supported framework for peace, the three-state solution has gained attention as doubts about the feasibility of a two-state outcome have grown. In January 2009, The New York Times reported that Egypt and Jordan were apprehensive about potentially reassuming control over Gaza and the West Bank.

The Jordanian government has strongly opposed granting Jordanian citizenship to Palestinians, fearing demographic and political consequences.

During the 2010 Jordanian parliamentary election, concerns arose that if Israeli-Palestinian negotiations failed and the Palestinian Authority dissolved, Jordan might be compelled to reabsorb the West Bank. Some speculated that Israel might favor this outcome over a two-state solution.

However, some Jordanian figures, such as Senate President Taher al-Masri, have expressed support for Jordanian sovereignty over the West Bank. In May 2010, al-Masri referred to "the two united banks [of the Jordan River], with the Hashemite Kingdom of Jordan emerging on both banks of the holy river".

== Proponents ==
The three-state solution has been advocated by:

- Israeli tourism minister Binyamin Elon, who in 2002 advocated the formal annexation of West Bank and Gaza by Israel. The Palestinians would become citizens of Jordan with residency in Israel, but would be encouraged to relocate. See the Elon Peace Plan.
- Former U.S. Ambassador to the UN John Bolton, who proposed returning Gaza to Egypt and the West Bank to Jordan.
- Israeli MK Aryeh Eldad, who supported granting Jordanian citizenship to Palestinians.
- Israeli Major General (res.) Giora Eiland, who endorsed the proposal in a September 2008 publication by The Washington Institute for Near East Policy.
- Scholar Daniel Pipes, who called it "a uniquely sober way" to achieve peace.
- Political scientist Ian Bremmer, who described it as "a difficult plan whose time has come".
- An editorial in The New York Sun, which argued that neither the two-state nor one-state solution is viable.
- Israeli historian Benny Morris proposed a joint Jordanian-Palestinian state, including Gaza, in his 2009 book, "One State, Two States."

In 1997, discussions at the Foreign and Commonwealth Office in London involved Gerald Levin regarding a proposed canal from the Dead Sea, which could create agricultural opportunities for Jordan, Egypt, and Israel. Reports suggested Jordan might administer 17–21% of the West Bank to facilitate the project.

== Alternative use of the phrase ==
The term three-state solution has also been used to describe the post-2007 reality following the Fatah–Hamas conflict, where:

- The Palestinian Authority governs the West Bank,
- Israel controls its sovereign territory,
- Hamas rules the Gaza Strip.

Some analysts argue this de facto division renders the two-state solution obsolete. In 2012, reports suggested Hamas was considering declaring Gaza's independence with Egyptian backing.

In 2025, Steve Bannon suggested a Three-state solution, which would include a Christian state.

== See also ==
- United Nations Partition Plan for Palestine (1947)
- List of Middle East peace proposals
  - One-state solution
  - Two-state solution
- Jordanian option
  - Jordanian annexation of the West Bank (1950–1967/1988)
  - King Hussein's federation plan (1972)
  - Peres–Hussein London Agreement (1987)
- Allon Plan (1967)
- State of Palestine (declared 1988)
- State of Judea (declared 1988)
- Madrid Conference of 1991
- Oslo Accords (1993, 1995)
- Palestinian Authority (est. 1995)
- Aram (region)

General concepts

- From the river to the sea
- Greater Israel
- Halachic state
- Palestinianism
- Zionism

== Bibliography ==
- Karsh, Efraim. Arafat's War: The Man and His Battle for Israeli Conquest. New York: Grove Press, 2003.
