= Two-state solution =

Proposed diplomatic solution for the Israeli–Palestinian conflict

A peace movement poster: Israeli and Palestinian flags and the Arabic and Hebrew words for peace. Similar images have been used by several groups supporting a two-state solution to the conflict.

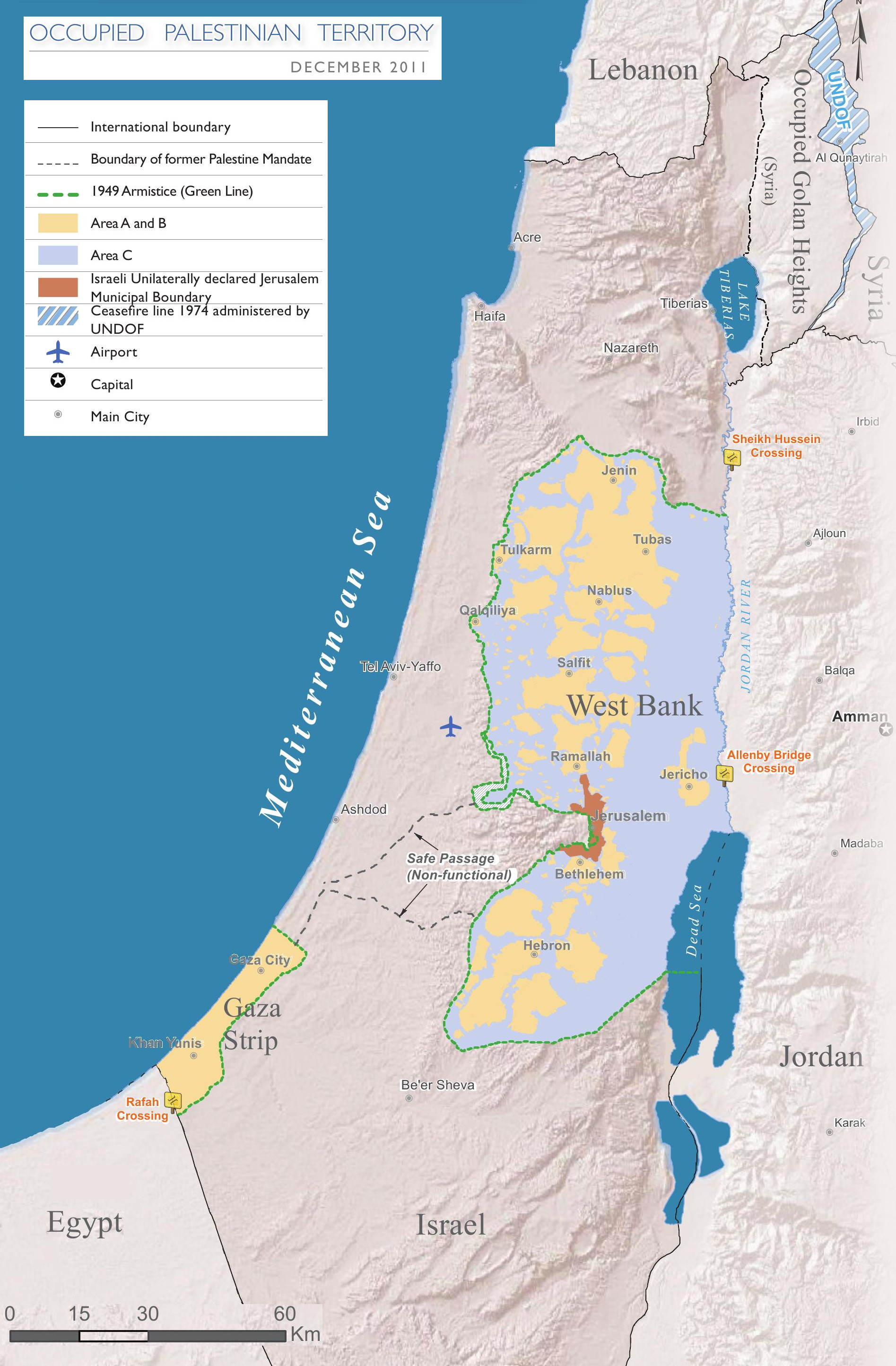
Map of the West Bank and the Gaza Strip, 2011. Agreeing on acceptable borders is a major difficulty with the two-state solution.

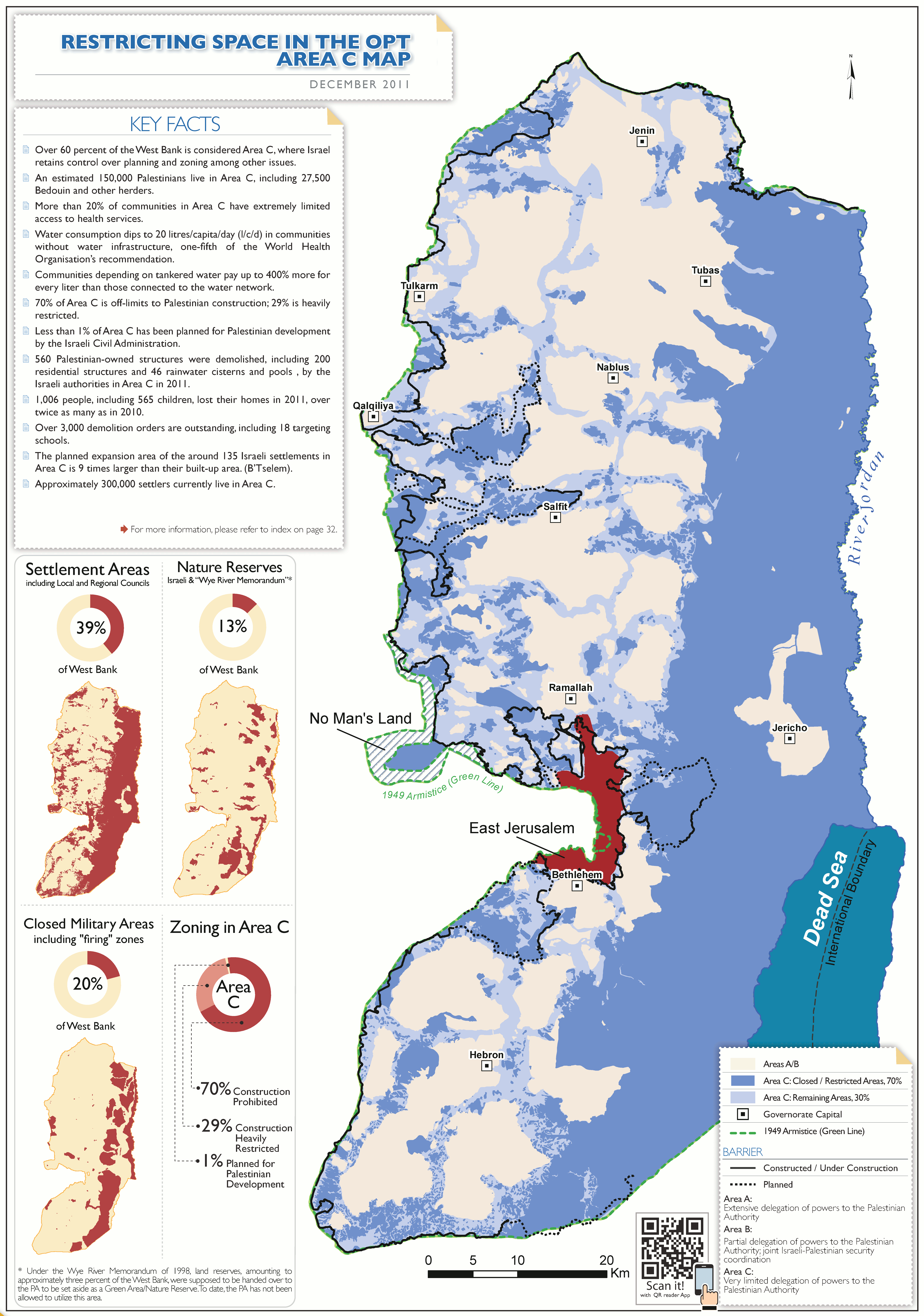
Area C of the West Bank, controlled by Israel, in blue and red, December 2011

The two-state solution is a proposed approach to resolving the Israeli–Palestinian conflict, by creating two states on the territory of the former Mandatory Palestine. The two-state solution is supported by many countries and the Palestinian Authority. Israel currently does not support the idea, though it did in the past.

The first proposal for separate Jewish and Arab states in the territory was made by the British Peel Commission report in 1937. In 1947, the United Nations General Assembly adopted a partition plan for Palestine, leading to the 1948 Palestine war. As a result, Israel was established on the area the UN had proposed for the Jewish state, as well as almost 60% of the area proposed for the Arab state. Israel took control of West Jerusalem, which was meant to be part of an international zone. Jordan took control of East Jerusalem and what became known as the West Bank, annexing it the following year. The territory which became the Gaza Strip was occupied by Egypt but never annexed. Since the 1967 Six-Day War, both the West Bank (including East Jerusalem) and Gaza Strip have been militarily occupied by Israel, becoming known as the Palestinian territories.

The Palestine Liberation Organization has accepted the concept of a two-state solution since the 1982 Arab Summit, on the basis of an independent Palestinian state based in the West Bank, Gaza and East Jerusalem. In 2017, Hamas announced their revised charter, which claims to accept the idea of a Palestinian state within the 1967 borders, but without recognising the statehood of Israel. Diplomatic efforts have centred around realizing a two-state solution, starting from the failed 2000 Camp David Summit and the Clinton Parameters, followed by the Taba Summit in 2001. The failure of the Camp David summit to reach an agreed two-state solution formed the backdrop to the commencement of the Second Intifada, the violent consequences of which marked a turning point among both peoples' attitudes. A two-state solution also formed the basis of the Arab Peace Initiative, the 2006–2008 peace offer, and the 2013–2014 peace talks.

As of 2024, there is no two-state solution proposal being negotiated between Israel and Palestinians. The Palestinian Authority supports the idea of a two-state solution; Israel at times has also supported the idea, but passed a resolution to reject the creation of a Palestinian state. Long-serving Israeli prime minister Benjamin Netanyahu objects to the two state solution. Former Israeli prime ministers Ehud Barak and Ehud Olmert in late 2023 expressed support for a two-state solution. Public support among Israelis and Palestinians (measured separately) for "the concept of the two-state solution" have varied between above and below 50%, partially depending on how the question was phrased.

The major points of contention include the specific boundaries of the two states (though most proposals are based on the 1967 lines), the status of Jerusalem, the Israeli settlements and the right of return of Palestinian refugees. Observers have described the current situation in the whole territory, with the Israeli occupation of the West Bank and blockade of the Gaza Strip, as one of de facto Israeli sovereignty. The two-state solution is an alternative to the one-state solution and what observers consider a de facto one-state reality.

Following the October 7 attacks and the subsequent Gaza war, multiple governments restarted discussions on a two-state solution. This received pushback from Israel's government, especially from Netanyahu. On 26 September 2024, Saudi Foreign Minister Prince Faisal bin Farhan Al Saud and Norway's Foreign Minister Espen Barth Eide co-chaired a meeting of representatives of about 90 countries, held on the sidelines of the UN General Assembly, to launch a global alliance for a two-state solution.

== History ==
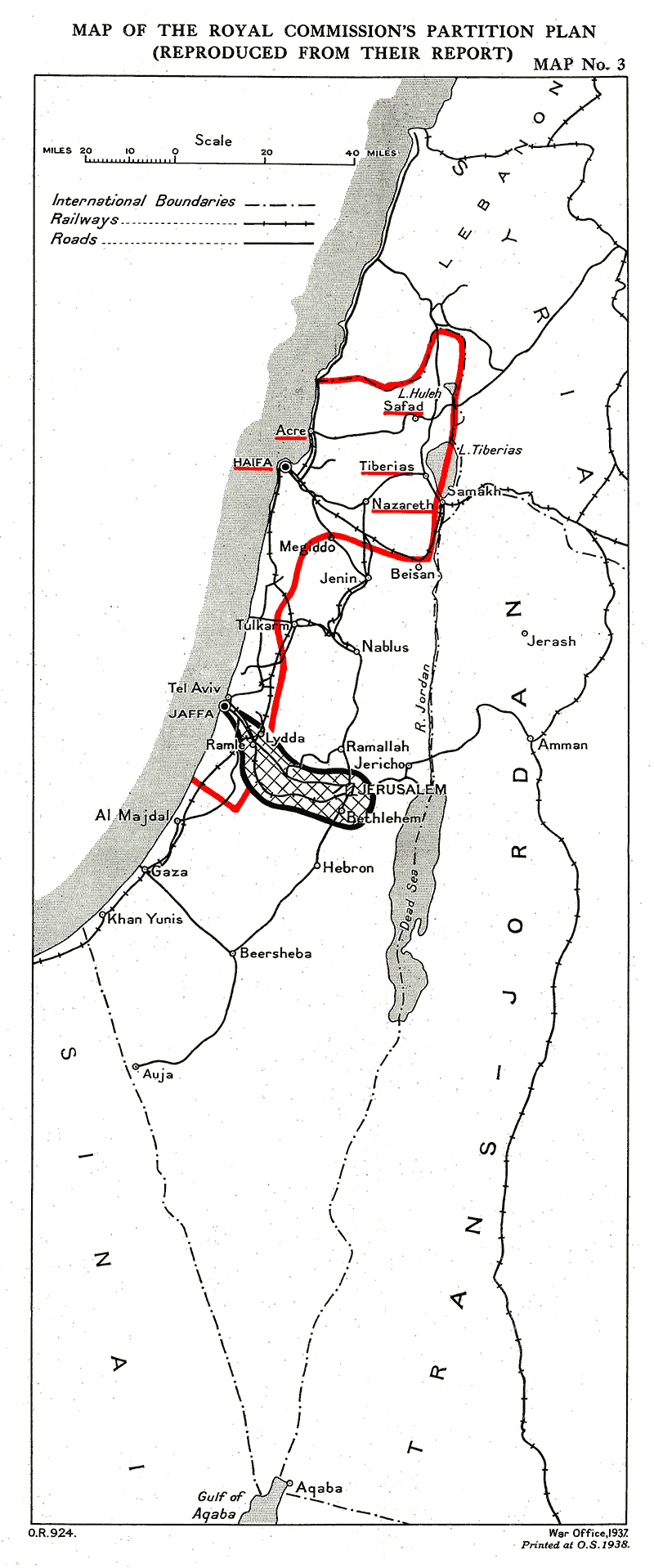
Peel Commission

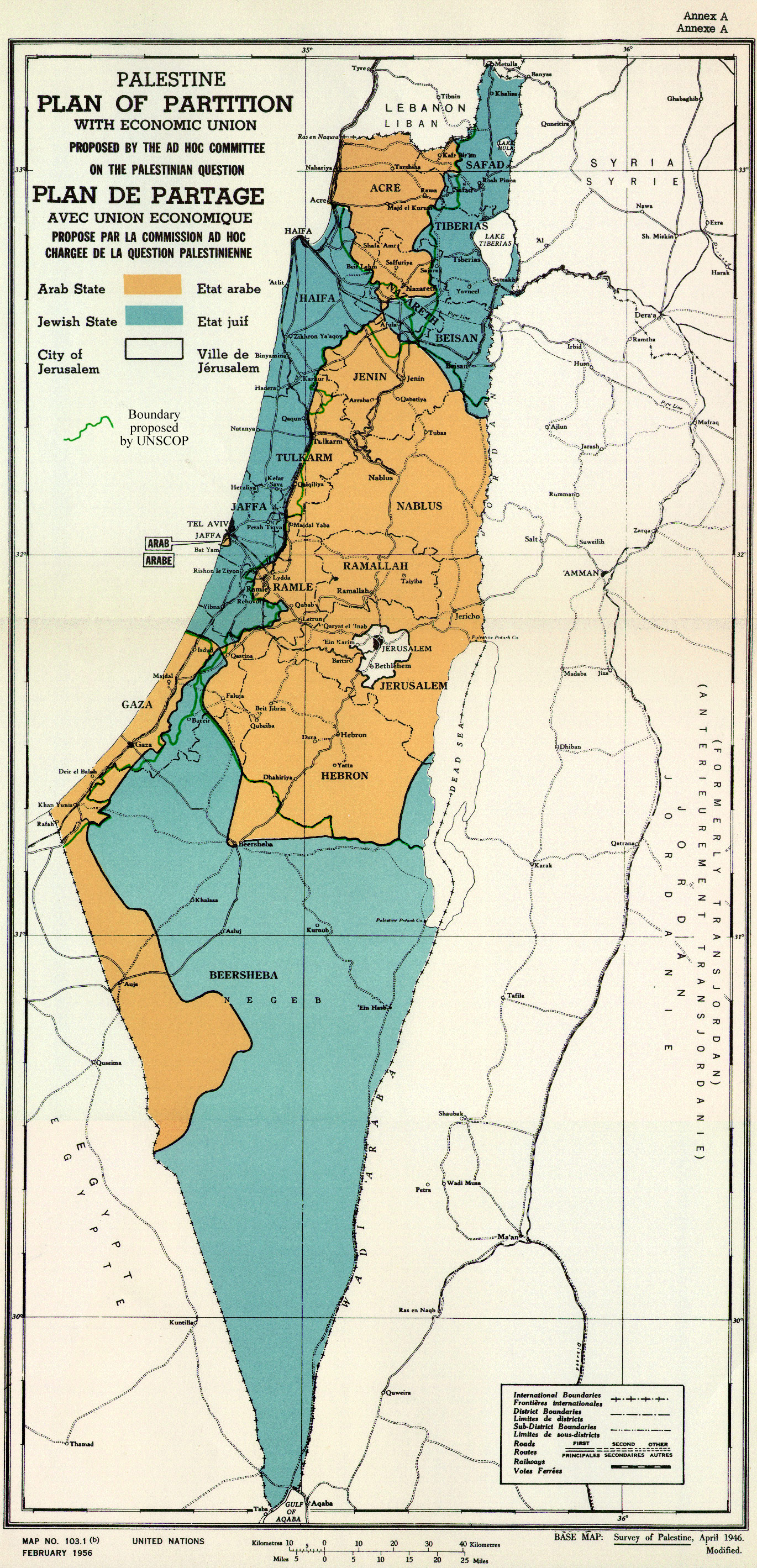
UN Partition Plan

Early plans for two-state solution

In the wake of Jewish migration from Europe in the context of Zionism and intercommunal conflict in Mandatory Palestine, the first proposal for the creation of Jewish and Arab states in the British Mandate of Palestine was made by the British Peel Commission report of 1937 led by William Peel, 1st Earl Peel. The plan maintained a mandate covering a small area containing Jerusalem and allotted the poorest lands of Palestine, including the Negev Desert, and areas that are known today as the West Bank and the Gaza Strip to the Arabs; while most of the coastline and some of Palestine's most fertile agricultural land in the Galilee were allotted to the Jews. Consequently, the recommended partition proposal was rejected by the Arab community of Palestine, and was accepted by most of the Jewish leadership.

Partition was again proposed by the 1947 UN Partition Plan for the division of Palestine. It proposed a three-way division, again with Jerusalem held separately, under international control. The partition plan was accepted by Jewish Agency for Palestine and most Zionist factions who viewed it as a stepping stone to territorial expansion at an opportune time. The Arab Higher Committee, the Arab League and other Arab leaders and governments rejected it on the basis that Arabs formed a two-thirds majority and owned a majority of the lands. They also indicated an unwillingness to accept any form of territorial division, arguing that it violated the principles of national self-determination in the UN Charter. They announced their intention to take all necessary measures to prevent the implementation of the resolution. Subsequently, the Intercommunal conflict in Palestine gave way to civil war and the plan was not implemented.

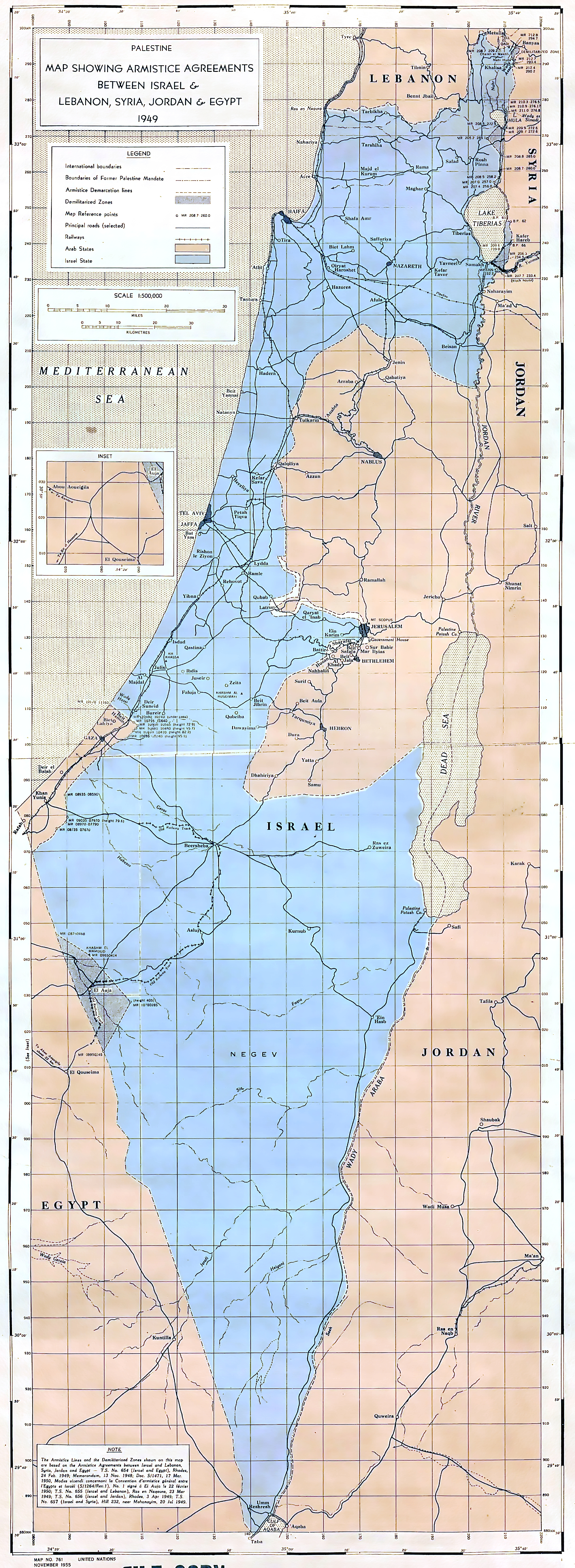
1955 United Nations map showing the borders of Israel according to the Green Line of the 1949 Armistice Agreements.

At the end of the British Mandate, with the establishment of the State of Israel and entry of Arab regular armies into what had been Mandatory Palestine, the 1948 war became an international conflict. At the end of the war, the Green Line established by the 1949 Armistice Agreements became the de facto borders of the State of Israel. The war resulted in the fleeing or expulsion of 711,000 Palestinians, which the Palestinians call Nakba, from the territories which became the state of Israel.

=== UN resolution 242 and the recognition of Palestinian rights ===
After the 1967 Arab–Israeli war, the United Nations Security Council unanimously passed resolution 242 calling for Israeli withdrawal from the territories occupied during the war, in exchange for "termination of all claims or states of belligerency" and "acknowledgement of sovereignty, territorial integrity and political independence of every state in the area". The Palestine Liberation Organization (PLO), which had been formed in 1964, strongly criticized the resolution, saying that it reduced the question of Palestine to a refugee problem.

In September 1974, 56 member states proposed that "the question of Palestine" be included as an item in the General Assembly's agenda. In a resolution adopted on 22 November 1974, the General Assembly affirmed Palestinian rights, which included the "right to self-determination without external interference", "the right to national independence and sovereignty", and the "right to return to their homes and property". These rights have been affirmed every year since.

=== Early Palestinian articulations of two-state solution ===
The first indication that the PLO would be willing to accept a two-state solution, on at least an interim basis, was articulated by Said Hammami in the mid-1970s.

=== Likud party's insistence on only Israeli sovereignty ===
The Israeli Likud party, in its manifesto for the 1977 elections which it won in a landslide, declared: "Between the sea and the Jordan there will only be Israeli sovereignty." Similar statements have been made by Israeli Prime Minister Benjamin Netanyahu as late as 18 January 2024.

On 18 July 2024, the Israeli parliament passed a resolution that rejected the establishment of a Palestinian state. The resolution passed in the Knesset with 68 votes in favour and nine against it. Netanyahu's coalition with far-right parties co-sponsored the resolution, while the opposition left the session to avoid supporting the statement.

=== Palestinian Declaration of Independence ===
The Palestinian Declaration of Independence of 15 November 1988, which referenced the UN Partition Plan of 1947 and "UN resolutions since 1947" in general, was interpreted as an indirect recognition of the State of Israel, and support for a two-state solution. The Partition Plan was invoked to provide legitimacy to Palestinian statehood. Subsequent clarifications were taken to amount to the first explicit Palestinian recognition of Israel.

=== 2017 Hamas charter ===
The 2017 Hamas charter presented the Palestinian state being based on the 1967 borders. The text says "Hamas considers the establishment of a Palestinian state, sovereign and complete, on the basis of the June 4, 1967, with Jerusalem as its capital and the provision for all the refugees to return to their homeland." This is in contrast to Hamas' 1988 charter, which previously called for a Palestinian state on all of Mandatory Palestine. Nevertheless, even in the 2017 charter, Hamas did not recognize Israel.

=== 6th Netanyahu cabinet ===
In December 2022, Benjamin Netanyahu returned as Prime Minister of Israel, forming the most right-wing government in Israel's history. Netanyahu's coalition partners rejected the two-state solution. In February 2023, Netanyahu said he would be willing to grant Palestinians autonomy but not sovereignty, and in any future deal Israel would maintain full security control of the West Bank. In June 2023, Netanyahu told members of the Knesset that Israel must block the creation of a Palestinian state.

Later in 2023, despite Israeli PM Netanyahu's statement denying the creation of a Palestinian state as a condition for a normalization with Saudi Arabia, Saudi Arabian crown prince Mohammed bin Salman said normalization with Israel was "for the first time real". This was an apparent reversal of Saudi policy, articulated in the 2002 Arab Peace Initiative, when Saudi Arabia had offered Israel normalization with the whole Arab world if Israel allows the creation of a Palestinian state. Israeli and other officials involved in the negotiations confirmed that the Saudis were considering normalization with Israel without the creation of a Palestinian state. Many Palestinians worried that Israeli-Saudi normalization would cost them their last significant leverage for Palestinian statehood.

In October 2023, Hamas launched an attack on Israel. Numerous sources identified the lack of a Palestinian state as a cause of the war. The Associated Press wrote that Palestinians are "in despair over a never-ending occupation in the West Bank and suffocating blockade of Gaza". After Israel invaded Gaza, Netanyahu once again reiterated his opposition to the existence of a Palestinian state.

== Diplomatic efforts ==
Security Council resolutions dating back to June 1976 supporting the two-state solution based on the pre-1967 lines were vetoed by the United States, which supports a two-state solution but argued that the borders must be negotiated directly by the parties.

After the First Intifada began in 1987, considerable diplomatic work went into negotiations between the parties, beginning with the Madrid Conference in 1991. The most significant of these negotiations was the Oslo Accords, which officially divided Palestinian land into three administrative divisions and created the framework for how much of Israel's political borders with the Palestinian territories function today. The Accords culminated in the Camp David 2000 Summit, and follow-up negotiations at Taba in January 2001, which built explicitly on a two-state framework, but no final agreement was ever reached. The violent outbreak of the Second Intifada in 2000 had demonstrated the Palestinian public's disillusionment with the Oslo Accords and convinced many Israelis that the negotiations were in vain.

Recognition of Israel only Recognition of both Israel and Palestinian State Recognition of Palestinian State only Israel and Palestinian State

In 2002, Crown Prince Abdullah of Saudi Arabia (who would go on to be King from 2005 to 2015) proposed the Arab Peace Initiative, which garnered the unanimous support of the Arab League while Israeli leaders continually refuse to discuss the initiative. President Bush announced his support for a Palestinian state, opening the way for United Nations Security Council Resolution 1397, supporting a two-state solution.

At the Annapolis Conference in November 2007, three major parties – The PLO, Israel, and the US – agreed on a two-state solution as the outline for negotiations. However, the summit failed to achieve an agreement.

Following the conflict that erupted between the two main Palestinian parties, Fatah and Hamas, Hamas took control of the Gaza Strip, splintering the Palestinian Authority into two polities, each claiming to be the true representatives of the Palestinian people. Fatah controlled the Palestinian National Authority in the West Bank and Hamas governed in the Gaza Strip.

The latest initiatives were the 2013–2014 Israeli–Palestinian peace talks under the guidance of John Kerry, the United States Secretary of State. These talks also failed to reach an agreement.

== Viability ==
By 2010, when direct talks were scheduled to be restarted, continued growth of settlements on the West Bank and continued strong support of settlements by the Israeli government had greatly reduced the land and resources that would be available to a Palestinian state, creating doubt among Palestinians and left-wing Israelis that a two-state solution continued to be viable.

In January 2012 the European Union Heads of Mission report on East Jerusalem found that Israel's continuing settlement activities and the fragile situation of the Palestinian population in East Jerusalem, as well in area C, was making a two-state solution less likely. The Israeli Foreign Ministry rejected this EU report, claiming it was "based on a partial, biased and one sided depiction of realities on the ground". In May 2012, the EU council stressed its "deep concern about developments on the ground which threaten to make a two-state solution impossible".

On 29 November 2012, the UN General Assembly voted by 138 to 9, with 46 abstentions, to recognize Palestine as a "non-member observer state". On the following day, Israeli PM Benjamin Netanyahu announced the building of 3,000 new homes on land to the east of East Jerusalem, in an area referred to as "E-1". The move was immediately criticized by several countries, including the United States, with Israeli ambassadors being personally called for meetings with government representatives in the United Kingdom, France and Germany, among others. Israel's decision to build the homes was described by the Obama administration as "counterproductive", while Australia said that the building plans "threaten the viability of a two-state solution". This is because they claim the proposed E-1 settlement would physically split the lands under the control of the Palestinian National Authority in two, as the extent of the PNA's authority does not extend all the way to the River Jordan and the Dead Sea. Israel's Labor party has voiced support for the two-state solution, with Isaac Herzog stating it would be "in Israel's interests".

In March 2015, Netanyahu declared that a Palestinian state would not be established during his administration, while he also stated that he disapproved of the one-state solution for the ongoing conflict between two people.

After the Trump administration's controversial decision to recognize Jerusalem as Israel's capital in December 2017, Palestinian officials said the policy change "destroys the peace process" and the decision indirectly meant the United States was "abdicating its role as a peace mediator" because the United States had become a party to the dispute instead of neutral intercessor for negotiations.

A 2021 survey among 521 scholars who have dedicated their professional lives to the study of this region and its politics found that 52 percent of respondents believed the two-state solution is no longer possible. If a two-state solution is not achieved, 77 percent predict "a one-state reality akin to apartheid" and 17 percent "one-state reality with increasing inequality, but not akin to apartheid"; one percent think a binational state with equal rights for all inhabitants is likely.

On November 18, 2026 Australia announced sanctions targeting three Israelis and four groups. The reason was settlement expansion in the occupied West Bank and violence by settlers. According to Australian Foreign Minister Penny Wong, those blacklisted helped create new settlements. Their work included raising money, finding volunteers, and backing violent settlers. Wong also condemned recent violence around the E1 settlement project. That project, she warned, would split Palestinian land in two, cut it off from East Jerusalem, and damage any hope of a two-state solution. The sanctions prevent Australians and Australian companies from dealing with the listed people and groups. They can't offer them any kind of support either.

== Settlements in the West Bank ==
UN resolutions affirm the illegality of settlements in West Bank, including East Jerusalem, including United Nations Security Council Resolution 2334 passed in December 2016. As of November 2023, there are at least 700,000 Israeli settlers in the Occupied West Bank and East Jerusalem across 150 settlements and 128 outposts. More than three-quarters of the existing settlements have been constructed since the Oslo Accords.

The establishment and expansion of the illegal settlements in the Occupied West Bank constitute a major challenge to the possibility of a two-state solution by "violating Palestinian sovereignty, threatening civil peace and security, jeopardizing water resources, and blocking agricultural development." This has progressively reduced Area A and B of the West Bank territory to a "shrinking archipelago of enclaves".

Proposals have been offered for over 50 post-evacuation compensation of settlers for abandoned property, as occurred following Israel's withdrawal of settlements from Gaza in 2005 and from the Sinai Peninsula in 1982. Some settlers in those previous withdrawals were forcibly removed by the IDF.

== Public opinion in Israel and Palestine ==
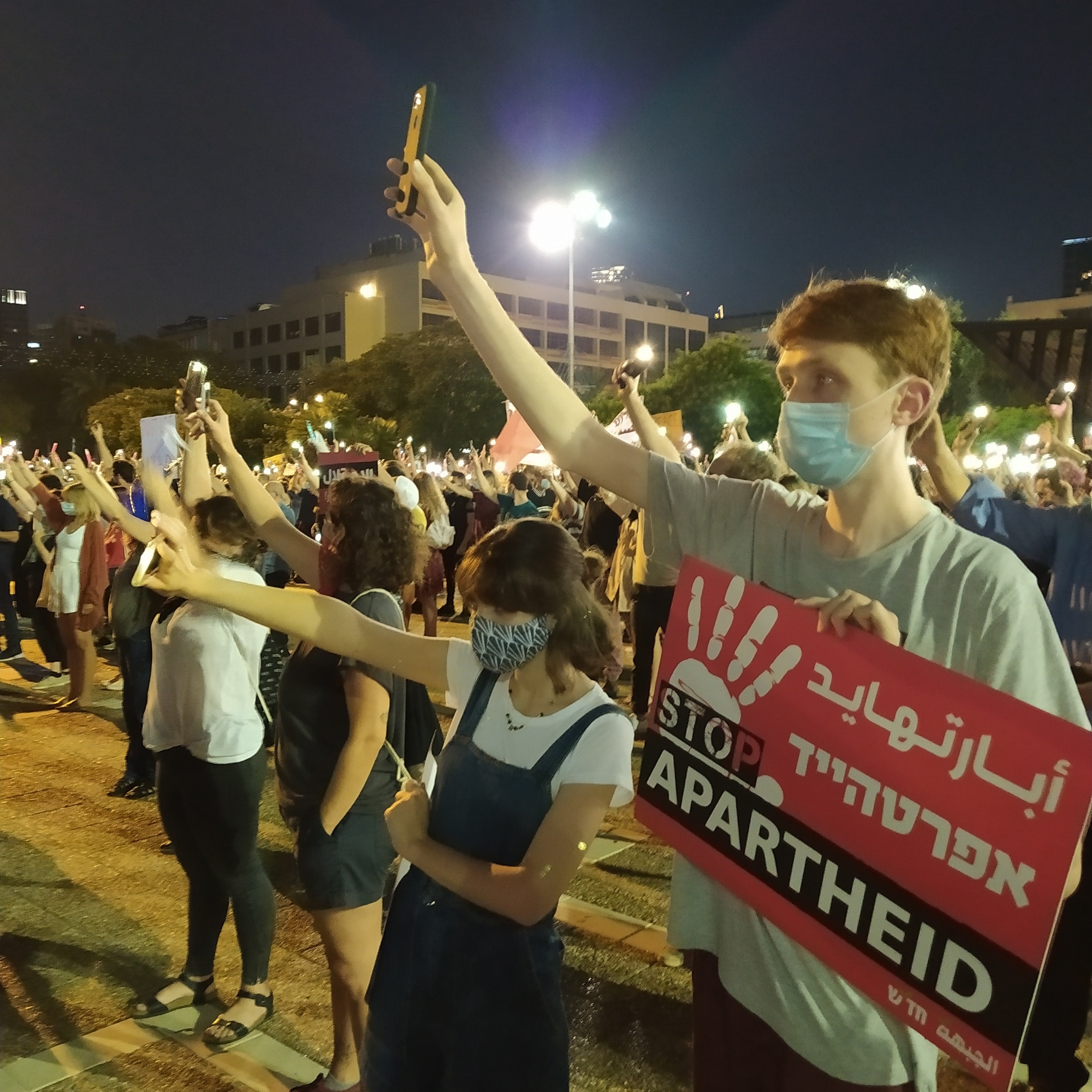
Israeli demonstration against annexation of the West Bank, Rabin Square, Tel Aviv-Yafo, June 6, 2020

In a 2002 poll conducted by PIPA, 72% of both Palestinians and Israelis supported at that time a peace settlement based on the 1967 borders so long as each group could be reassured that the other side would be cooperative in making the necessary concessions for such a settlement. A 2013 Gallup poll found 70% of Palestinians in the West Bank and 48% of Palestinians in Gaza Strip, together with 52% of Israelis supporting "an independent Palestinian state together with the state of Israel".

Support for a two-state solution varies according to the way the question is phrased. Some Israeli journalists suggest that the Palestinians are unprepared to accept a Jewish State on any terms. According to one poll, "fewer than 2 in 10 Arabs, both Palestinian and all others, believe in Israel's right to exist as a nation with a Jewish majority." Another poll, however, cited by the US State Department, suggests that "78 percent of Palestinians and 74 percent of Israelis believe a peace agreement that leads to both states living side by side as good neighbors" is "essential or desirable".

In 2021, a poll by the Palestinian Center for Policy and Survey Research revealed that 39% of Palestinians supported "the concept of the two-state solution", while 59% said they rejected it. Support is even lower among younger Palestinians; in 2008, then-U.S. Secretary of State Condoleezza Rice noted: "Increasingly, the Palestinians who talk about a two-state solution are my age." A survey taken before the outbreak of fighting in 2014 by the Washington Institute for Near East Policy (WINEP) found that 60 percent of Palestinians say the goal of their national movement should be "to work toward reclaiming all of historic Palestine from the river to the sea" compared to just 27 percent who endorse the idea that they should work "to end the occupation of the West Bank and Gaza and achieve a two-state solution." WINEP says that "this is a new finding compared to similar (but not identical) questions asked in the past, when support for a two-state solution typically ranged between 40–55 percent". By 2020, 40% in Gaza and 26% in the West Bank believe that a negotiated two-state solution should solve the conflict. Another report, published also in 2021 by the RAND Corporation, found that also 60% of Israelis across the political spectrum were opposed to a two-state solution.

The two-state solution enjoyed majority support in Israeli polls although there has been some erosion to its prospects over time. A 2014 Haaretz poll asking "Consider that in the framework of an agreement, most settlers are annexed to Israel, Jerusalem will be divided, refugees won't return to Israel and there will be a strict security arrangement, would you support this agreement?", only 35% of Israelis said yes.

According to a 2021 PCPSR poll, support for a two-state solution among Palestinians and Israeli Jews, as of 2021, had declined to 43 percent and 42 percent, respectively. According to Middle East experts David Pollock and Catherine Cleveland, as of 2021, the majority of Palestinians said they wanted to reclaim all of historic Palestine, including pre-1967 Israel. A one-state solution with equal rights for Arabs and Jews was ranked second.

Some researchers argue that the two-state solution has already been implemented because Jordan, which makes up 78% of the former Mandatory Palestine, was originally created as a state for the Arabs.

In December 2022, support for a two-state solution was 33% among Palestinians, 34% among Israeli Jews, and 60% among Israeli Arabs. 82% of Israeli Jews and 75% of Palestinians believed that the other side would never accept the existence of their independent state.

At the end of October 2023, the two-state solution had the support of 71.9% of Israeli Arabs and 28.6% of Israeli Jews. Prior to the October 7 attack, according to Gallup, just 24% of Palestinians supported a two-state solution, a drop from 59% in 2012.

=== Notable individuals ===
Ehud Olmert, Israel's Prime Minister from 2006 to 2009, told Politico on 16 October 2023 that the two-state solution "is the only real political solution for this lifelong conflict". On 6 November 2023, he told CBC that "a two-state solution should still be the goal of the Israeli government".

Ehud Barak, Israel's Prime Minister from 1999 to 2001 and Minister of Defense from 2007 to 2013, told TIME on 6 November 2023 that "The right way is to look to the two-state solution".

Interviewed by Ezra Klein on 8 December 2023, Nimrod Novik, a member of the executive committee of Commanders for Israel's Security (CIS), reiterated the CIS's view that the two-state solution is "the only solution that [...] serves Israel's security and well-being long-term."

Ami Ayalon, the head of Israel's Shin Bet internal security service from 1995 to 2000, said on 14 January 2024 in an interview with The Guardian that "Israel will not have security until Palestinians have their own state".

On 17 July 2024, Ehud Olmert and former Palestinian Authority Foreign Minister Nasser al-Kidwa, signed a joint proposal for an end to the Gaza war, and subsequent steps towards a two-state solution.

Yair Golan, former IDF deputy chief of staff and current leader of The Democrats, a political party formed by a merger of the Israeli Labor Party and Meretz, said in a July 2024 interview with the Guardian, "Our vision is a two-state solution [...]".

== International positions regarding two-state solution ==
Following the October 7 attacks and the subsequent Gaza war, multiple governments renewed the long-dormant idea of a two-state solution. This received serious pushback from Israel's government, especially from Prime Minister Benjamin Netanyahu.

=== Support ===
==== Global Alliance for the Implementation of a Palestinian State and a Two-State Solution ====
On 26 September 2024, Saudi Foreign Minister Prince Faisal bin Farhan Al Saud and Norway's Foreign Minister Espen Barth Eide co-chaired a meeting of representatives of about 90 countries, held on the sidelines of the UN General Assembly, to launch a global alliance to strive for a two-state solution. Subsequent meetings of the alliance took place in October 2024 in Riyadh, in November 2024 in Brussels and in January 2025 in Oslo. A UN High-Level Conference on "The Peaceful Settlement of the Question of Palestine and the Implementation of the Two-State Solution" convened by France and Saudi Arabia was held in New York July, 2025. The two-state vision devised by A Land for All was presented at the conference.

==== G7 ====
In the statement issued after their virtual meeting of 6 December 2023, the Leaders of the G7 wrote that they are "committed to a Palestinian state as part of a two-state solution that enables both Israelis and Palestinians to live in a just, lasting, and secure peace."

==== European Union ====
Josep Borrell, High Representative of the European Union for Foreign Affairs and Security Policy, wrote on 15 November 2023: "We need to work with our regional partners towards [...] the two-state solution [...] it remains the only viable way to bring peace to the region."

In her address to the G20 leaders on 22 November 2023, Ursula von der Leyen, President of the European Commission, said: "We have to [...] work for a two-state solution. This is the only way to ensure lasting peace for Israeli and Palestinian people as neighbours."

==== Arab League ====
In a statement issued following its 16 May 2024 meeting in Manama, the 22-member Arab League called for an international conference "to resolve the Palestinian issue on the basis of the two-state solution".

==== United States ====
President Joe Biden had made numerous statements in favour of a two-state solution, as have Secretary of State Antony Blinken and Defense Secretary Lloyd Austin.

==== China ====
China's Foreign Minister Wang Yi has stated that "China calls for [...] the formulation of a specific timetable and road map for the implementation of the 'two-state solution'".

==== Germany ====
Germany, in a governmental declaration of 2021, repeated in November 2023, wished for an independent Palestinian state side by side with Israel, in peace with each other, and 'based on the 4 June 1967 borders' unless 'the conflicting parties agree' about changing those borders, while also the Palestinian refugee problem "needs a just and realistic solution".

In November 2023, Chancellor Olaf Scholz repeated Germany's call for a two-state solution for Israel and the Palestinians.

==== India ====
India's External Affairs Minister S Jaishankar, at the February 2024 Munich Security Conference ('Peace through Dialogue'), referring to the prevailing situation in Gaza, said that a two-state solution to the Palestine issue is now "more urgent" than before.

==== United Kingdom ====
The previous Prime Minister Rishi Sunak and Foreign Secretary David Cameron, strongly advocated a two-state solution. David Cameron and German Minister of Foreign Affairs Annalena Baerbock published a joint statement, supporting a two-state solution. Keir Starmer, when Prime Minister, wrote that the only solution that can break the cycle of violence is "a two-state solution, with Israel [...] safe and secure alongside the [...] Palestinian state.". In 2026, Ed Miliband reiterated the UK's commitment to the two-state solution.

==== France ====
President Emmanuel Macron has advocated a two-state solution.

==== Italy ====
Following a meeting with Palestinian Prime Minister Mohammed Mustafa, Italian Foreign Minister Antonio Tajani reiterated Italy's support for the two-state solution.

==== Latvia ====
During his 2022 visit to Palestine, Latvian President Egils Levits met with Palestinian President Mahmoud Abbas and reaffirmed Latvia's support for a two-state solution, describing it as a path "that would bring peace and understanding to the neighboring nations." He also expressed hope that Palestinians would be able to hold secular, free, and fair elections.

In 2025, Latvia's Ministry of Foreign Affairs reiterated the country's support for a two-state solution but emphasized that the recognition of Palestine as a state is not currently on the government's agenda and that "the most important tasks at the moment are to release the hostages taken by Hamas and to prevent the threat posed by Hamas, as well as to urgently address the humanitarian catastrophe in Gaza."

==== North Korea ====
Since 1988, North Korea has recognized the State of Palestine and supported the two-state solution with the founding an independent Palestinian state with East Jerusalem as its capital.

==== Canada, Australia and New Zealand ====
Canada's Prime Minister Justin Trudeau, Australia's Prime Minister Anthony Albanese and New Zealand's Prime Minister Christopher Luxon have issued a joint statement, saying "We recommit ourselves to [...] a just and enduring peace in the form of a two-state solution".

==== Saudi Arabia ====
Saudi Foreign Minister Prince Faisal Bin Farhan has said that Saudi Arabia would be interested in a normalisation deal with Israel that is linked to a two-state solution.

=== Opposed ===
==== Israel ====
Prime Minister Benjamin Netanyahu has repeatedly and emphatically rejected a two-state solution, emphasizing that "Israel will continue to oppose unilateral recognition of a Palestinian state."

==== Iran ====
President Ebrahim Raisi has rejected a two-state solution, instead proposing a "single state based on ballot boxes involving Palestinians of all faiths".

== Non-governmental supporters of a two-state solution ==
=== North America ===
New York Times columnist Thomas Friedman has strongly supported President Biden's calls for a two-state solution and criticised Prime Minister Netanyahu's opposition.

Twenty-seven former Jewish leaders of organizations including AIPAC, the Jewish Agency for Israel, the Jewish Federations of North America, the Conference of Presidents of Major American Jewish Organizations and the Union for Reform Judaism, wrote a letter to President Biden on 14 December 2023, calling for a "steadfast US commitment to the pursuit of two states for two peoples".

=== United Kingdom ===
In "The Jewish Manifesto for the General Election 2024" published on 21 June 2024, the Board of Deputies of British Jews called for "a negotiated two-states model", resulting in "a secure Israel alongside a viable Palestinian state". On 17 July 2024, the Board of Deputies reaffirmed its support for "a two state solution with a secure Israel alongside a viable Palestinian state."

== Other solutions ==
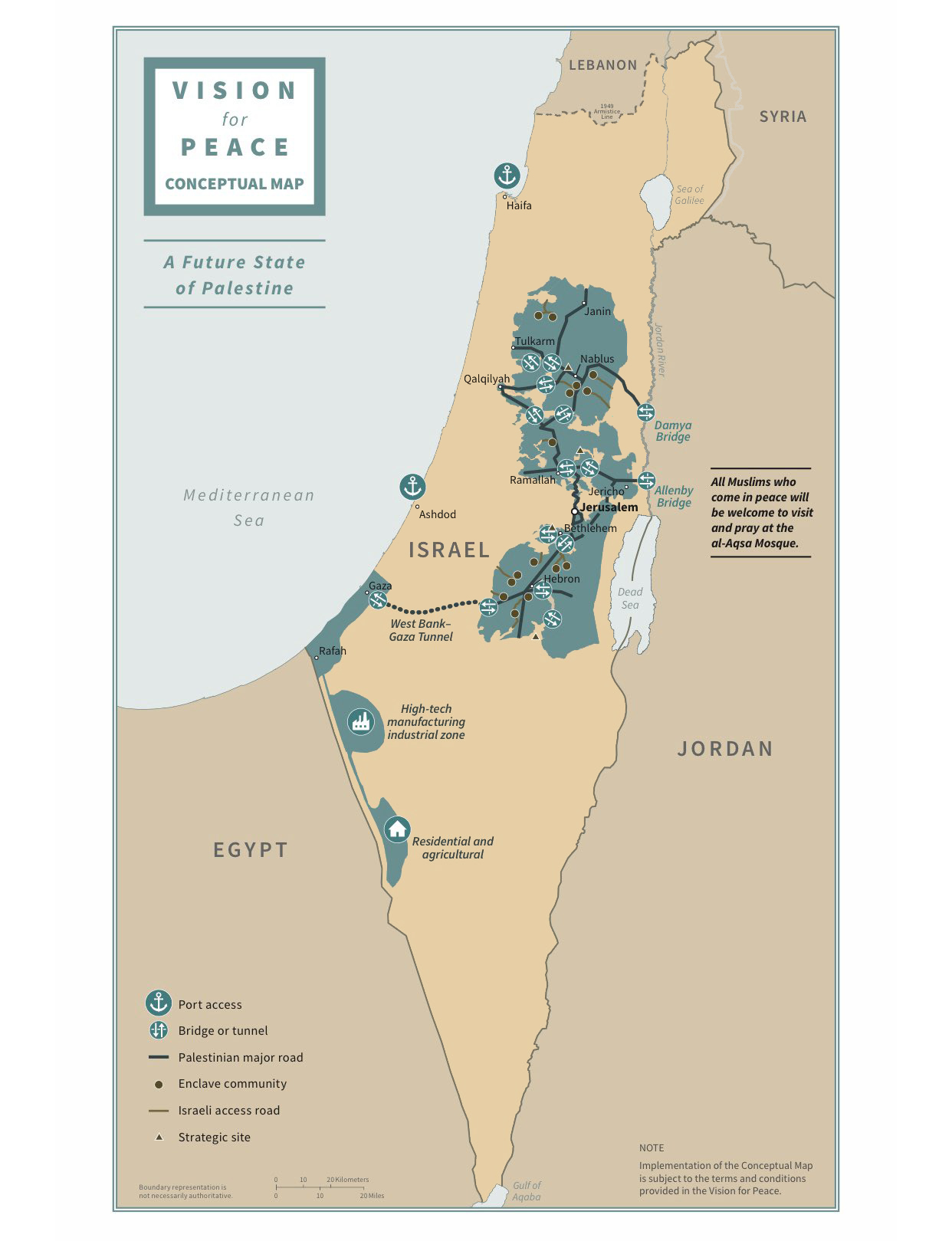
Trump's peace plan for the creation of the State of Palestine.

The main alternative is the binational solution, which could either be a twin regime federalist arrangement or a unitary state. Other alternatives are the three-state solution and the Jordanian option, also known as the "no-state solution".

=== Three-state solution ===
The three-state solution has been proposed as another alternative. The New York Times in 2009 reported that Egypt and Jordan were concerned about having to retake responsibility for Gaza and the West Bank. In effect, the result would be Gaza returning to Egyptian rule, and the West Bank to Jordan.

=== Jordanian option ===
The "Jordanian option" refers to various proposals aimed at resolving the Israeli–Palestinian conflict through the involvement of the Kingdom of Jordan. These proposals generally involve Jordan retaking control of parts of the West Bank or establishing a federation or confederation with a Palestinian state.

In the 1950s and 1960s, King Hussein of Jordan and his officials promoted the idea that "Jordan is Palestine and Palestine is Jordan," aiming to present Jordanians and Palestinians as one unified people with a shared destiny. Following the 1967 Six-Day War, which resulted in Jordan losing the West Bank to Israel, Israeli leaders Yigal Allon and Abba Eban presented King Hussein with the Allon Plan, which suggested returning parts of the West Bank to Jordan. However, disagreements over this plan led to a stalemate in negotiations. In 1986, PLO Chairman Yasser Arafat and King Hussein of Jordan reached an agreement advocating for a peaceful solution to the conflict based on a Jordanian-Palestinian confederation. This idea was further explored through the secret Peres–Hussein London Agreement of April 1987, resulting from covert discussions between Israel and Jordan. In 1988, King Hussein renounced Jordan's claims to the West Bank and Palestinian affairs. Despite Jordanian opposition to the confederation idea, leading to limited advocacy from Israeli leaders, renewed interest in the Jordanian option has emerged as a potential solution to the Israeli-Palestinian conflict.

=== Dual citizenship ===
A number of proposals for the granting of Palestinian citizenship or residential permits to Jewish settlers in return for the removal of Israeli military installations from the West Bank have been fielded by such individuals as Arafat, Ibrahim Sarsur and Ahmed Qurei.

Israeli Minister Moshe Ya'alon said in April 2010 that "just as Arabs live in Israel, so, too, should Jews be able to live in Palestine." ... "If we are talking about coexistence and peace, why the [Palestinian] insistence that the territory they receive be ethnically cleansed of Jews?"

The idea has been expressed by both advocates of the two-state solution and supporters of the settlers and conservative or fundamentalist currents in Israeli Judaism that, while objecting to any withdrawal, claim stronger links to the land than to the state of Israel.

=== New-state solution ===
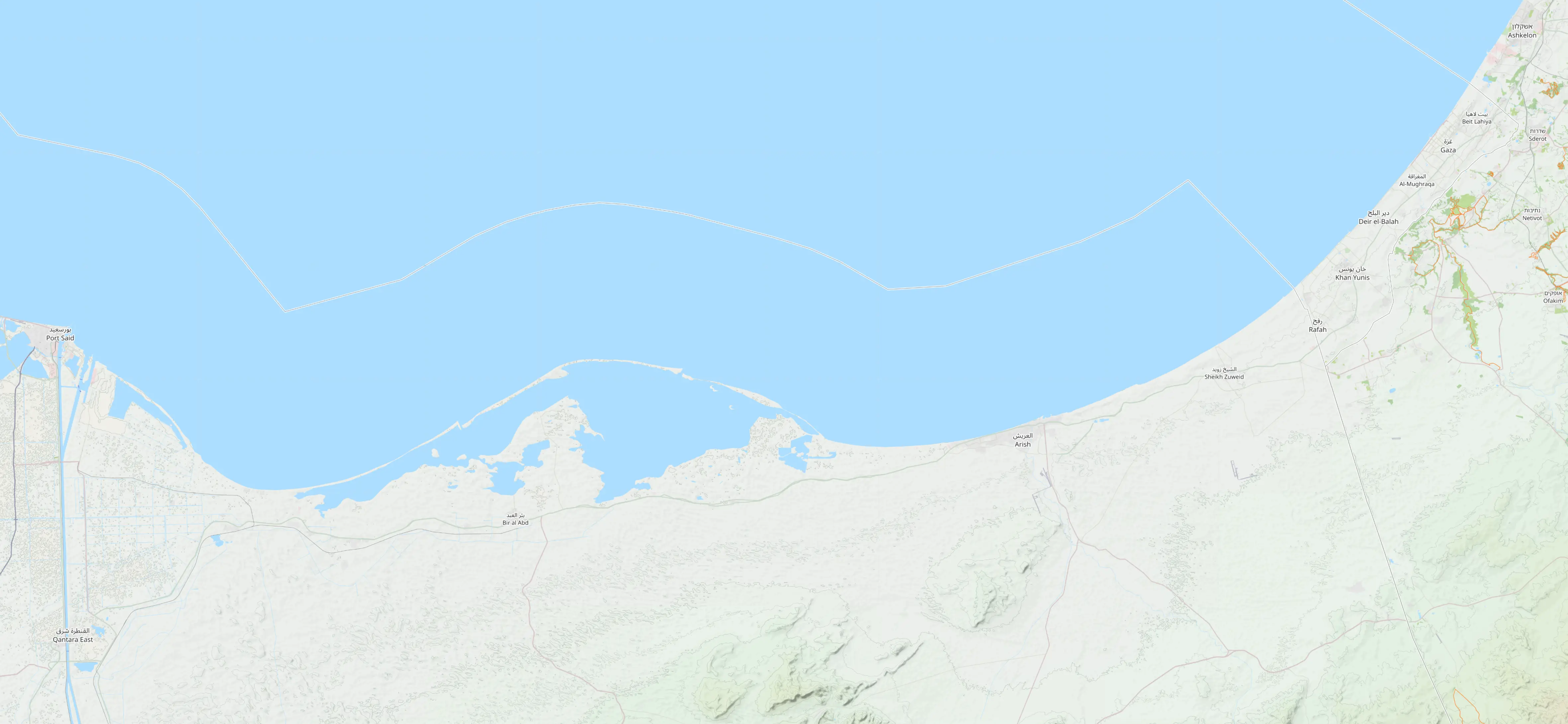
Map showing the Sinai Peninsula along the Mediterranean Sea with Gaza and Israel on the right side.

The New-state solution to the Israeli–Palestinian conflict proposes to resolve the conflict by establishing a new city-state on the Sinai Peninsula along the Mediterranean Sea close to Arish. The implementation of a New-state solution would involve the establishment of a democratic independent sovereign State of Palestine away from the State of Israel in what is currently Egypt.

== See also ==
- United Nations Partition Plan for Palestine (1947)
- List of Middle East peace proposals
  - One-state solution
  - Three-state solution
  - A Land for All (Two-State Confederation)
- Jordanian option
  - Jordanian annexation of the West Bank (1950-1967/1988)
  - King Hussein's federation plan (1972)
  - Peres–Hussein London Agreement (1987)
- Allon Plan (1967)
- State of Palestine (declared 1988)
- State of Judea (declared 1988)
- Madrid Conference of 1991
- Oslo Accords (1993, 1995)
- Palestinian Authority (est. 1995)
- High-Level Week of the 80th Session of the United Nations General Assembly 2025

General concepts

- From the river to the sea
- Greater Israel
- Halachic state
- Palestinianism
- Zionism

== Bibliography ==
- Ashton, Nigel (2008). King Hussein of Jordan. New Haven and London: Yale University Press. ISBN 978-0-300-09167-0. No Google Books preview (August 2024).
- Bani Salameh, Mohammed Torki; El-Edwan, Khalid Issa (2016). "The identity crisis in Jordan: historical pathways and contemporary debates". Nationalities Papers: The Journal of Nationalism and Ethnicity. 44 (6). Routledge: 985–1002. doi:10.1080/00905992.2016.1231454.
- Peters, Joel; Newman, David, eds. (2015). Routledge Handbook on the Israeli-Palestinian Conflict. London and New York: Routledge, Taylor & Francis Group. ISBN 9781138925373. No Google Books preview (August 2024).
- Quandt, William B. (2005). Peace Process: American Diplomacy and the Arab-Israeli Conflict Since 1967 (3rd ed.). Washington, D.C., Berkeley and Los Angeles: Brookings Institution Press and University of California Press. pp. 261–262. ISBN 9780520246317.
- Siniver, Asaf, ed. (2023). Routledge Companion to the Israeli-Palestinian Conflict. Abingdon and New York: Routledge. ISBN 978-1-032-24901-8.
- Sharnoff, Michael (2024). "Visualizing Palestine in Arab postage stamps: 1948–1967". Middle Eastern Studies. 60 (6). Routledge: 979–999. doi:10.1080/00263206.2024.2314523.
- Shemesh, Moshe (2010). "On Two Parallel Tracks – The Secret Jordanian-Israeli Talks (July 1967–September 1973)". Israel Studies. 15 (3). Indiana University Press: 87–120. doi:10.2979/isr.2010.15.3.87. JSTOR 10.2979/isr.2010.15.3.87.
- Shlaim, Avi (2008). Lion of Jordan: The Life of King Hussein in War and Peace. New York: Knopf. ISBN 978-1-4000-4305-7.
