= Jordanian option =

Proposal to end Israeli–Palestinian conflict

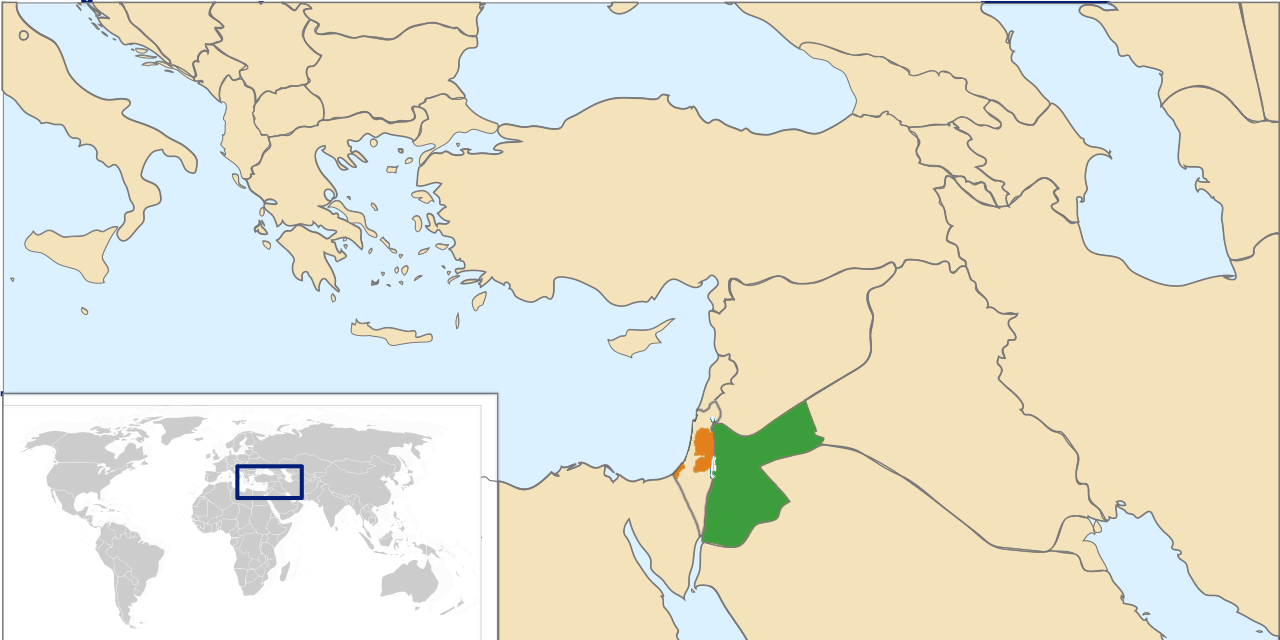
Jordan (in green) and the Palestinian Territories (in orange)

The Jordanian option refers to a range of proposals and strategies aimed at resolving the Israeli–Palestinian conflict through the involvement of neighboring Jordan.

Historically, this concept has encompassed various ideas, including Jordan retaking control over parts of the West Bank, establishing a federation or confederation between Jordan and a Palestinian state ("Jordanian option"), or envisioning Jordan as a homeland for Palestinians ("Jordan is Palestine"), implying a resettlement of much of the West Bank's Arab population to Jordan and the Israeli annexation of the territory. The viability and acceptance of the Jordanian option have fluctuated over time, with different leaders and groups either supporting or opposing it at different periods.

The West Bank became a distinct territorial entity when Transjordan (later Jordan) captured it during the 1948 Arab–Israeli War. Jordan subsequently lost control of the West Bank to Israel during the 1967 Six-Day War. After the war, Israeli leaders, particularly from the Labor Party, contemplated returning a significant portion of the West Bank to Jordan. King Hussein of Jordan supported this approach, and negotiations between him and Israeli representatives were largely focused on this issue, with proposals such as the Allon Plan and the Federation Plan. In 1985, Hussein and PLO Chairman Yasser Arafat formalized a joint position advocating for a Jordanian-Palestinian confederation. The secret Peres–Hussein London Agreement of April 1987 resulted from extensive covert discussions between Israel and Jordan on this matter.

However, in 1988, Hussein renounced Jordanian claims to the West Bank. Although support for the confederation model was expressed by figures such as Shimon Peres and Yasser Arafat in the subsequent decade, Jordanian officials have since opposed this option and endorsed the two-state solution instead. Given the limited success of other proposed solutions to the Israeli-Palestinian conflict, in some corners there are attempts at reconsidering the Jordanian option as a potential resolution.

== Background ==
The Kingdom of Jordan, originally established as the Emirate of Transjordan, was created after World War I by the victorious colonial powers. Its territory was carved out in 1921 from lands that were part of British-ruled Palestine, which itself was formed from the remnants of the Ottoman Empire. The state's formation was influenced by the territorial ambitions of its ruling Hashemite dynasty, led by Abdullah I, who sought to create a Greater Syria that included Lebanon, Syria, Jordan, and Palestine. This plan did not come to fruition. As Abdullah realized that achieving this vision was unattainable, he focused solely on Palestine, considering it part of a unified entity with Transjordan. In the 1930s, Jordan's rulers began to engage in Palestinian affairs, acting as intermediaries for Arab factions during the 1936–1939 Arab revolt.

The British withdrawal from Palestine in May 1948 presented Jordan with an opportunity to exert control over parts of the region through military action. In the aftermath of the 1948 Arab–Israeli War, Jordan occupied the territory that became known as the West Bank, originally designated for an Arab state by the 1947 UN partition plan. Jordan annexed the area, granted Jordanian citizenship to its residents, and also took control of East Jerusalem (the UN partition plan proposed all of Jerusalem to become a corpus separatum). The annexation followed several conferences, most notably the Jericho Conference on December 1, 1948, where Palestinian leaders denounced the Egypt-aligned All-Palestine Government, called for Jordan to annex the West Bank, and pledged allegiance to Abdullah as the king of a unified state.

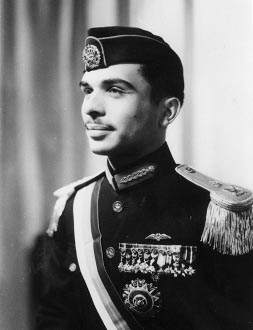
In the 1950s and 1960s, King Hussein of Jordan and his officials frequently proclaimed that 'Jordan is Palestine and Palestine is Jordan,' aiming to present Jordanians and Palestinians as one people with a shared destiny.

In 1950, Jordanian citizenship was extended to Palestinian refugees in Jordan, leading them to be content with the status quo and to actively work on advancing and reinforcing it. In the 1950s and 1960s, King Hussein (who succeeded his grandfather after his 1951 assassination by a Palestinian and a one-year reign by Hussein's father) as well as other Jordanian officials frequently stated that "Jordan is Palestine and Palestine is Jordan." King Hussein often emphasized that Jordanians and Palestinians were united as one people with a shared destiny. Due to internal challenges and the influence of Arab nationalism, Jordan participated in the 1967 Six-Day War, resulting in the loss of the West Bank to Israel.

It is estimated that at least 50 percent of Jordan's population is of Palestinian descent. As of 2023, more than 2 million Palestinians are registered as refugees with UNRWA in Jordan, although most are also Jordanian citizens holding national ID numbers.

== "Jordan is Palestine and Palestine is Jordan": Jordanian concept of full integration ==
In the 1950s and 1960s, the Jordanian government, including King Hussein and other officials, promoted the slogan "Jordan is Palestine and Palestine is Jordan." This reflected the Hashemite strategy to integrate Palestinians into Jordanian society and to present the populations on both sides of the Jordan River as a single, unified group. The regime aimed to prevent the emergence of a separate Palestinian identity and power base. Jordanian citizenship was extended to Palestinians both in Jordan and the West Bank, which contributed to their contentment with the status quo and their efforts to support and reinforce it.

== "Jordanian option": Palestinian-Jordanian federation or confederation ==
=== 1967–1970 ===
Jordan joined the 1967 Six-Day War alongside Egypt and Syria, and lost control of the West Bank to Israel. Following the war, Israeli leaders, particularly from the Labor Party, considered returning a significant portion of the West Bank to Jordan as a potential solution to the conflict. King Hussein of Jordan supported this approach, and viewed the return of the West Bank as a matter of 'life and death.' He secured a mandate from the Arab League during the Khartoum Summit to pursue its recovery, believing that failure to do so within one or two years could threaten his position due to rising Israeli influence and the growing detachment of the territory from Jordan. To secure West Bank loyalty, Jordan provided salaries to numerous employees and financial support to key figures, as well as funded various institutions, including municipalities, which received about 25% of their budgets from Amman. At the time, radical factions within the Ba'ath parties and the Arab National Movement advocated for transferring power to Jordan's Palestinian majority. They called for establishing a democratic system and replacing Bedouin dominance in the Jordanian military.

In 1968, Israeli leaders Yigal Allon and Abba Eban presented King Hussein with the Jordanian version of the Allon Plan, which proposed returning parts of the West Bank to Jordan. Disagreements over the plan eventually led to a stalemate in the negotiations.

In 1967, Israeli leaders debated two primary options for addressing the future of the West Bank: the Palestinian option and the Jordanian option. The Palestinian option entailed establishing a Palestinian entity linked to Israel through economic and defense agreements, as proposed in the Allon Plan by Yigal Allon. This plan suggested annexing the Jordan Valley and parts of the West Bank to Israel while creating an autonomous Arab region in the remaining areas. However, opposition from Prime Minister Levi Eshkol and other ministers prevented the plan from being adopted. Meanwhile, Israeli Defense Minister Moshe Dayan sought input from West Bank leaders and maintained support for both options. However, negotiations with Palestinian leaders were hindered by their adherence to the broader Arab position established at the Khartoum Summit, which rejected negotiations with Israel.

By mid-1968, as progress on the Palestinian option appeared unlikely, Israeli leaders increasingly favored the Jordanian option, which was endorsed by key figures such as Abba Eban following his first meeting with Hussein in May 1968. Early in the same year, Yigal Allon adapted the Allon Plan to propose that Jordan receive full control of the West Bank, rather than establishing Palestinian autonomy. This revised plan was informally presented by Eban and Allon to Hussein in another meeting in September 1968. However, disagreements on critical issues, including the status of Jerusalem and interpretations of UNSCR 242, led the negotiations to a stalemate.

=== 1970–1980 ===
In 1970, the PFLP hijacked four jetliners in Jordan, igniting them and triggering the "Black September", a Jordanian crackdown on Palestinian fedayeen militants. This period saw a significant shift in Israeli-Jordanian relations, particularly after Jordan's expulsion of Palestinian fedayeen in July 1971. During this period, Israel became a crucial ally for the stability of Jordan, with bilateral relations strengthening through secret talks that resumed in October 1970.

Following the "Black September", King Hussein expressed gratitude for Israeli support during the crisis and explored possibilities for further cooperation. However, when Yigal Allon proposed establishing a framework on the West Bank, which aligned with his earlier Allon Plan, Hussein's response was cautious. Ultimately, Meir's cabinet rejected Allon's proposal, and Hussein instead introduced his Federation Plan in March 1972. The plan called for establishing a "United Arab Kingdom" with two federal provinces—one in Transjordan and the other in the West Bank—while military and foreign affairs would be managed by a central government in Amman. Hussein aimed to attract Palestinians away from the PLO by demonstrating that a federation with Jordan was the most promising path to ending the occupation of the West Bank. This proposal, however, faced opposition from Palestinians who were either opposed to Hussein's rule or had reservations about it.

Even after "Black September", most West Bank leaders, except Ḥamdi Kan'an, the Mayor of Nablus, preferred to maintain connections with Jordan. In September 1972, when the Arab League discussed severing the connection between the West Bank and Jordan, West Bank mayors strongly opposed the idea, arguing that maintaining the connection was essential for political, economic, and humanitarian reasons.

Between March 1972 and September 1973, Israeli Prime Minister Golda Meir held six secret meetings with King Hussein of Jordan to discuss potential peace agreements and political arrangements. Hussein consistently stressed that any peace agreement would need to include the full integration of the West Bank, including East Jerusalem, into a Jordanian federation and expressed willingness to demilitarize the area once it was under Jordanian rule. Hussein resisted proposals that deviated from this vision, including a defense pact with Israel, and the implementation of the Allon Plan, which suggested territorial adjustments.

Egyptian President Anwar Sadat and U.S. Secretary of State Henry Kissinger both advocated for the confederation during the final months of Gerald Ford's presidency, with Kissinger predicting that Israel would have difficulty meeting the Palestine Liberation Organization's (PLO) expectations. Subsequently, in 1977, U.S. President Jimmy Carter proposed the confederation concept to Israeli Prime Minister Menachem Begin.

=== 1980–1988 ===
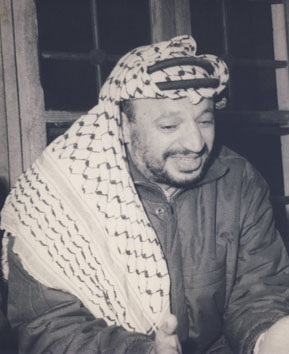
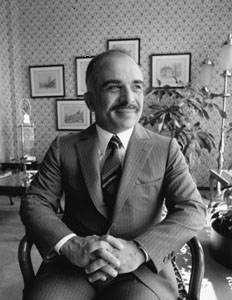
In 1985, PLO Chairman Yasser Arafat (left) and King Hussein of Jordan (right) signed the Amman Accord, which advocated for a peaceful solution to the conflict based on a Jordanian-Palestinian confederation.

On 11 February 1985, Hussein of Jordan and PLO Chairman Yasser Arafat formalized a joint position advocating for a confederation, dependent on Israel's withdrawal from occupied territories, which would allow Palestinians to exercise their right of self-determination. The plan, influenced by the 1982 Reagan initiative, proposed that both parties would negotiate as a joint delegation within an international conference framework. However, U.S. Secretary of State George Shultz was cautious, concerned that such a conference might pressure Israel unfairly. Jordan's foreign minister at the time, Taher Masri, who came from a Palestinian family based in Nablus, explained that the Amman Accord aimed to establish a foundational understanding between Jordan and the Palestinians, based on the belief that Jordan and the PLO should lead the effort to address the Palestinian issue, with the goal of achieving broader Arab approval at an Arab summit.

While the Jordan–PLO agreement raised concerns within the Reagan administration, Jordan later clarified that the confederation would function more like a federation, with Amman controlling foreign affairs and defense. Jordan also downplayed the role of an international conference, emphasizing the need for direct U.S. engagement with Jordanian and Palestinian representatives and suggesting that the PLO might accept UN Resolution 242 in exchange for some form of U.S. recognition of Palestinian self-determination within the proposed confederation. France supported a Jordanian-Palestinian confederation and stressed that resolving the Palestinian issue required cooperation with Jordan. On August 8, 1986, French Prime Minister Jacques Chirac stated he opposed an independent Palestinian state but supported a Palestinian homeland, noting that the PLO was not the sole representative of Palestinians and advocating for a solution negotiated with Jordan.

The secret Peres–Hussein London Agreement of April 1987 was the outcome of extensive covert discussions between Israel and Jordan on the matter. The agreement called for a conference involving the UN Security Council's permanent members and the parties to negotiate a settlement grounded in UN resolutions 242 and 338. It stipulated that the conference should not impose solutions or veto agreements and proposed direct negotiations through bilateral committees, with a Jordanian-Palestinian delegation addressing Palestinian issues. It required acceptance of the resolutions and renunciation of violence, with negotiations occurring independently and other issues resolved by Jordan and Israel. However, Israeli Prime Minister Yitzhak Shamir, distrustful of Foreign Minister Shimon Peres and fearing potential secret concessions, was reluctant to endorse the plan. He believed the international conference might lead to increased pressure and potential PLO involvement. Following this, King Hussein lost confidence in Peres, then the leading proponent of the Jordanian option, and did not meet with him again until after the Oslo Accord in 1993. During a secret meeting in July 1987, Shamir reassured Hussein that Likud and the Israeli government supported Jordan's stability.

=== 1988–2000 ===
In 1988, King Hussein renounced Jordan's claims to the West Bank and Palestinian affairs. The late 1980s and early 1990s saw increasing acknowledgment that the "Jordanian option" and various federation-based proposals, which did not include an independent Palestinian state, were no longer available. In 1991, the Palestinians participated in the Madrid Conference as members of the Jordanian delegation.

The early 1990s brought negotiations between Israel and the Palestine Liberation Organization, resulting in the Oslo Accords peace talks and the establishment of Palestinian Authority control over parts of the West Bank, which initially received widespread support from Israelis. Subsequent mass terror attacks by Palestinian factions such as Hamas and the Palestinian Islamic Jihad soon shifted Israeli public opinion.

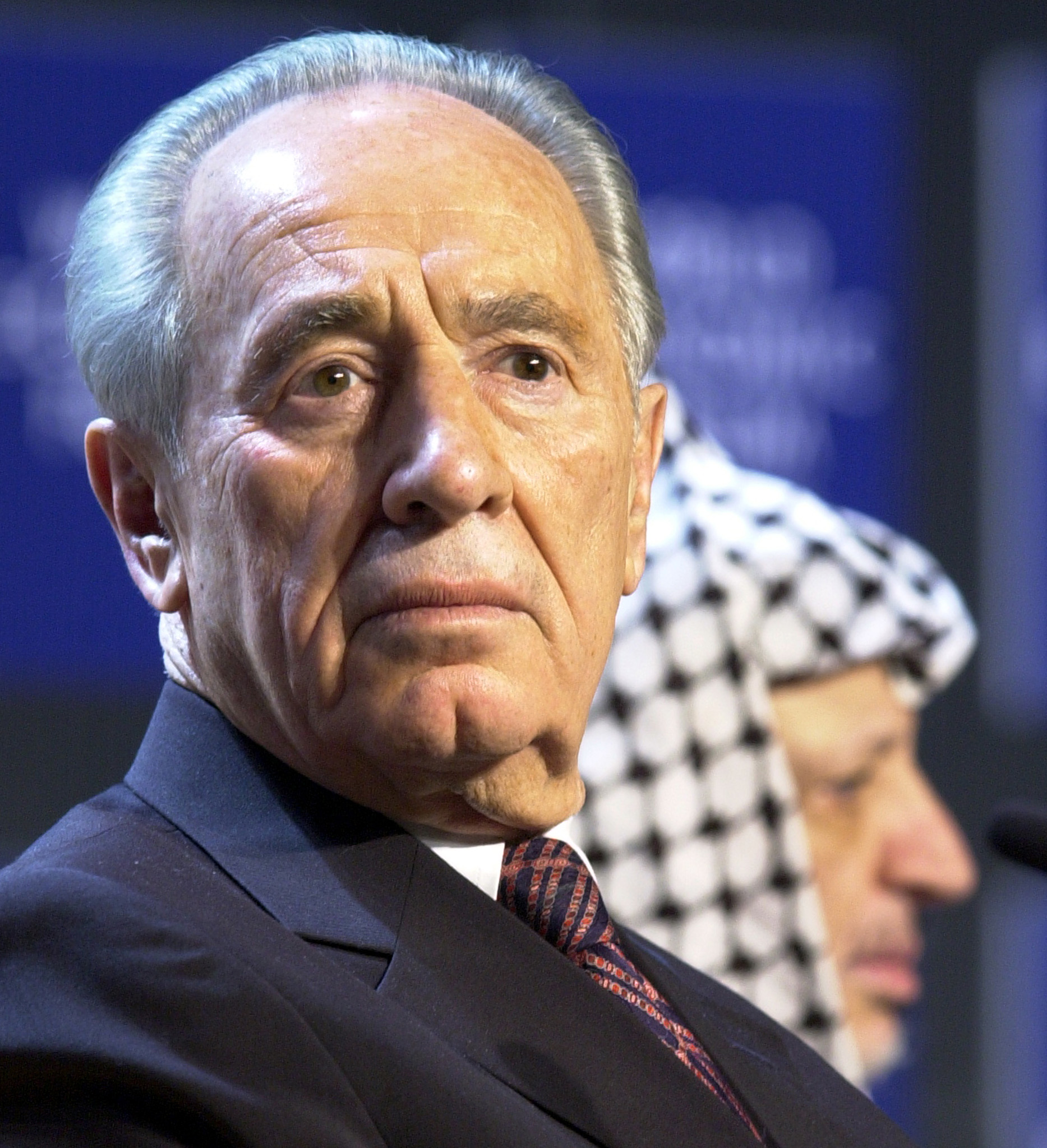
Israeli leader Shimon Peres (front) believed that a Jordanian-Palestinian confederation would lead to a more stable peace agreement. Palestinian president Yasser Arafat (back) affirmed that the Palestinians still supported this idea, as decided in 1983.

Shimon Peres, an architect of the peace talks with Palestinian leadership in the 1990s, did not view Palestinian statehood in the West Bank and Gaza as his preferred outcome or a natural result of the peace process. Instead, he "remained faithful to the idea of a Jordanian-Palestinian confederation," envisioning it as part of a three-way economic partnership involving Israel, a vision he pursued shortly after the Oslo Accords. Peres believed Jordan's stability and effective governance would provide a solid foundation for any agreement, in contrast to the economic and administrative challenges he anticipated for an independent Palestinian state. Palestinian leader Yasser Arafat did not dismiss this idea, and assured Peres that the Palestinian leadership remained committed to a confederation with Jordan, as previously decided by the Palestinian National Council in 1983. He proposed an economic structure akin to Benelux, involving Jordan, Lebanon, Israel, Palestine, and possibly Egypt, and suggested open borders for better regional cooperation.

At the time of the 2000 Camp David Summit, Jordanian leaders were worried that a Palestinian state could shift its territorial claims towards Jordan, affect the status of Palestinian refugees in Jordan, and undermine Jordan's special status over the Temple Mount. Peres sought to alleviate these concerns by emphasizing Jordan's central role in any regional agreement and securing its status in Jerusalem while inviting Jordanian leaders for reassurance.

=== 2001–present ===
Jordanian officials have formally opposed the concept of confederation in recent decades. In 2010, King Abdullah II of Jordan has affirmed his country's disinterest in the West Bank, stating: "Jordan does not want any part of the West Bank. The only credible solution, is the two state solution. There is no Jordanian solution.... the Palestinians want their own state." Ben Ami notes that while King Abdullah has expressed frustration with discussions about a confederation, he has consistently left the possibility open for such an arrangement once a Palestinian state is established, a sequences that reflects the consensus among the idea's supporters in Jordan.

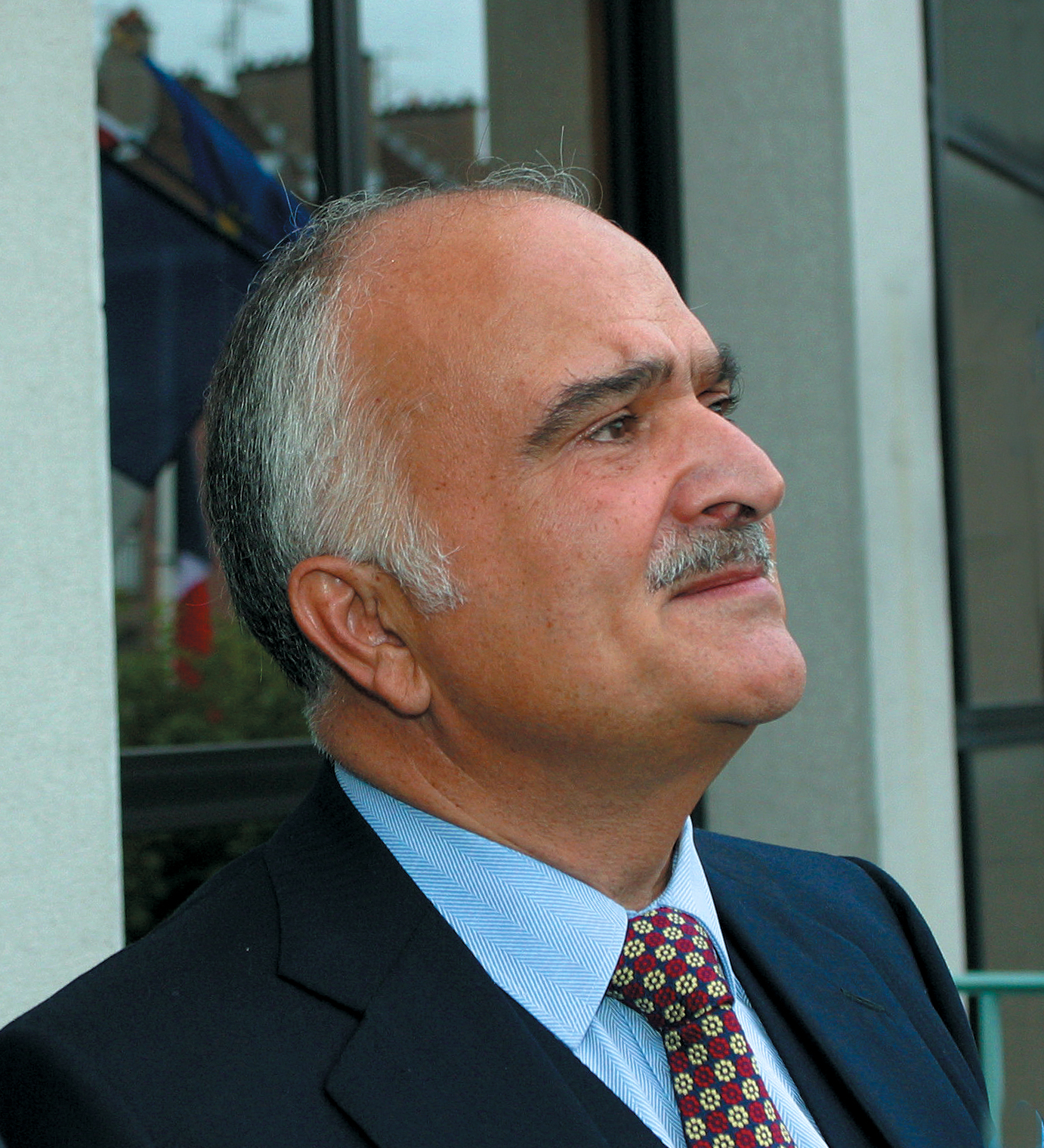
Prince Hassan bin Talal of Jordan is among the few Jordanian officials who have called for restoring Jordanian control over the West Bank since 1988, although his remarks are not officially endorsed by the Jordanian government.

Some in Jordan have hinted their support of the idea. Prince Hassan bin Talal, Hussein's brother, suggested that the West Bank was historically part of Jordan and hinting at potential re-unification, although his remarks are not officially endorsed by the Jordanian government and remain controversial.

Jordanian opposition to the confederation option resulted in few Israeli leaders advocating it openly. However, support for it occasionally surfaces. In the late 2000s, Giora Eiland, who served as Israel's national security adviser under Prime Minister Ariel Sharon, authored several articles advocating for a revival of "the Jordanian confederation option of years past." In 2018, Ayelet Shaked, then justice minister from the right-wing Jewish Home party, supported a vision of merging areas A and B of the West Bank and Gaza with Jordan as part of a confederation, while annexing Area C of the West Bank to Israel.

One proposal advocates for merging Areas A and B of the West Bank (red) with Jordan as part of a confederation, while annexing Area C of the West Bank (blue) to Israel.

In a 2021 opinion article for The New York Times, Israeli author Shmuel Rosner argued that while a Palestinian-Jordanian confederation is currently considered unviable—due to Jordan's rejection, Palestinian aspirations for statehood, and international dismissal of the idea as a right-wing ploy—the ongoing lack of progress suggest that this concept may be as feasible as other proposed solutions, and it remains a durable option. Writing for The Wall Street Journal, Israeli diplomat and historian Shlomo Ben-Ami suggested that, given the failure of other solutions to the Israeli-Palestinian conflict, revisiting the Jordanian option could be worthwhile. He argued that this might be the only remaining path to Palestinian statehood, providing Israel with a reliable partner and potentially ending the occupation of the West Bank.

In a 2021 opinion article for Foreign Policy, Jordanian entrepreneur Hasan Ismaik proposed reuniting Jordan and Palestine by reannexing the West Bank and granting Jordanian citizenship to all Palestinians. Ismaik highlights the historical precedent of Jordan's 1950 annexation of the West Bank, contrasts it with the failed solutions, violence and consistent unrest in recent decades, and asserts that such unification could benefit all parties by enhancing regional stability and economic growth. In 2022, American political scientist Alon Ben-Meir argued that current realities, such as the intermingling of populations and the status of Jerusalem, render a traditional two-state solution increasingly unfeasible. He stated that "independent Israeli and Palestinian states ... can peacefully coexist and be sustained" only through a confederation with Jordan, "which has an intrinsic national interest in the resolution of all conflicting issues."

In 2022, Saudi analyst Ali Shihabi published an article in Al Arabiya, in which he argued that the only realistic solution to the Palestinian issue is the expansion of Jordan to include territories from the West Bank and Gaza, forming "The Hashemite Kingdom of Palestine." Shihabi suggested that Palestinians should formally relinquish their claims to full control over Jerusalem, recognizing that dislodging Israel from the city is unrealistic, and instead focus on building a stable, economically viable state. In his view, Palestinians in Arab countries like Lebanon could gain citizenship in the expanded Hashemite Kingdom while retaining full residency rights in Lebanon, akin to EU citizens.

=== Public opinion ===
A 2018 poll conducted by the Ramallah-based Palestinian Center for Policy and Survey Research revealed that around two-thirds of Palestinians in the West Bank and Gaza oppose the idea. Khalil Shikaki, a Palestinian political scientist and pollster, attributed this opposition to distrust in the U.S. negotiating team and a belief that the proposal might undermine the goal of establishing a Palestinian state. Israeli journalist Shmuel Rosner writes that Israelis also generally reject this option because it would involve ceding historically and religiously significant territory to Jordan, which many find unacceptable. Nevertheless, they view the alternatives as even less viable: maintaining a military occupation of the West Bank is not sustainable, a one-state solution is unacceptable to Israeli Jews, and the two-state solution seems increasingly unattainable given the repeated failures to achieve it.

== "Jordan is Palestine": Palestinians to Jordan, West Bank to Israel ==
Another perspective on Jordanian involvement in resolving the conflict is the idea that Jordan could act as a homeland for Palestinians by resettling West Bank Palestinians there, a view expressed through the slogan "Jordan is Palestine."

In the 1980s, the slogan "Jordan is Palestine" was endorsed by hardliners within the right-wing Likud party, who advocated for the expulsion of West Bank Palestinians to Jordan. In 1988, following Jordan's disengagement from the West Bank, King Hussein of Jordan announced that West Bank Palestinians would no longer be considered Jordanian citizens to prevent this scenario. During a secret meeting in July 1987, Israeli Prime Minister Yitzhak Shamir reassured King Hussein that the Likud party and the Israeli government did not support the "Jordan is Palestine" policy. He emphasized that Jordan's stability and survival were top priorities and that they would avoid actions that could destabilize the country. In December 2023, Dutch politician Geert Wilders posted on X that "Jordan is Palestine!", prompting criticism from the Palestinian Authority, Jordan, and several Arab countries.

== See also ==
- One-state solution
- Two-state solution
- Three-state solution
- Palestinians in Jordan

== Bibliography ==
- Abadi, Jacob (2024). Between Arabia and the Holy Land: Jordan Throughout the Ages. Routledge. ISBN 978-1-032-58488-1.
- Ashton, Nigel (2008). King Hussein of Jordan. New Haven and London: Yale University Press. ISBN 978-0-300-09167-0. No Google Books preview (August 2024).
- Bani Salameh, Mohammed Torki; El-Edwan, Khalid Issa (2016). "The identity crisis in Jordan: historical pathways and contemporary debates". Nationalities Papers: The Journal of Nationalism and Ethnicity. 44 (6). Routledge: 985–1002. doi:10.1080/00905992.2016.1231454.
- Ben-Meir, Alon (2022). "The Case for an Israeli-Palestinian-Jordanian Confederation: Why Now and How?". World Affairs. 185 (1): 9–58. doi:10.1177/00438200211066350 – via Wiley Online Library.
- Peters, Joel; Newman, David, eds. (2015). Routledge Handbook on the Israeli-Palestinian Conflict. London and New York: Routledge, Taylor & Francis Group. ISBN 9781138925373. No Google Books preview (August 2024).
- Quandt, William B. (2005). Peace Process: American Diplomacy and the Arab-Israeli Conflict Since 1967 (3rd ed.). Washington, D.C., Berkeley and Los Angeles: Brookings Institution Press and University of California Press. pp. 261–262. ISBN 9780520246317.
- Siniver, Asaf, ed. (2023). Routledge Companion to the Israeli-Palestinian Conflict. Abingdon and New York: Routledge. ISBN 978-1-032-24901-8.
- Sharnoff, Michael (2024). "Visualizing Palestine in Arab postage stamps: 1948-1967". Middle Eastern Studies. 60 (6). Routledge: 979–999. doi:10.1080/00263206.2024.2314523.
- Shemesh, Moshe (2010). "On Two Parallel Tracks—The Secret Jordanian-Israeli Talks (July 1967–September 1973)". Israel Studies. 15 (3). Indiana University Press: 87–120. doi:10.2979/isr.2010.15.3.87. JSTOR 10.2979/isr.2010.15.3.87.
- Shlaim, Avi (2008). Lion of Jordan: The Life of King Hussein in War and Peace. New York: Knopf. ISBN 978-1-4000-4305-7.
