= Annexation of the West Bank =

Annexation of the West Bank may refer to:

- Jordanian annexation of the West Bank (1948–1967)
- Proposed Israeli annexation of the West Bank (1967–present)
