= Proposed Israeli annexation of the West Bank =

The annexation of the West Bank, or parts thereof, to Israel has been considered by Israeli politicians since the area was captured and occupied by Israel during the 1967 Six-Day War. Annexation of the Jordan Valley has been advocated by some Israeli politicians since the Israeli occupation of the West Bank began in 1967, most notably with the Allon Plan and the 2020 Trump peace plan.

East Jerusalem was the first part of the West Bank to be annexed; it was de facto annexed following its occupation by Israel in 1967, and de jure annexed following the 1980 Jerusalem Law. The annexation of the Jordan Valley, first proposed in the 1967 Allon Plan, was announced by Israeli prime minister Benjamin Netanyahu in September 2019 as his plan, subject to the outcome of the September 2019 Israeli legislative election. Israeli prime minister Netanyahu's September 2019 annexation proposal included Jericho becoming a Palestinian enclave.

Israeli law has been applied to Israeli settlements throughout the West Bank, leading to a system of "enclave law" and claims of "creeping annexation". Annexation of the West Bank would be condemned as illegal by the United Nations and would break international law.

In August of 2026, Israel initiated a transfer of power in the West Bank to the civilian Israeli Police, which many Palestinian analysts see as a move towards an illegal annexation of the West Bank and as a violation of International law.

== Proposals ==
=== Annexation of Israeli settlements ===
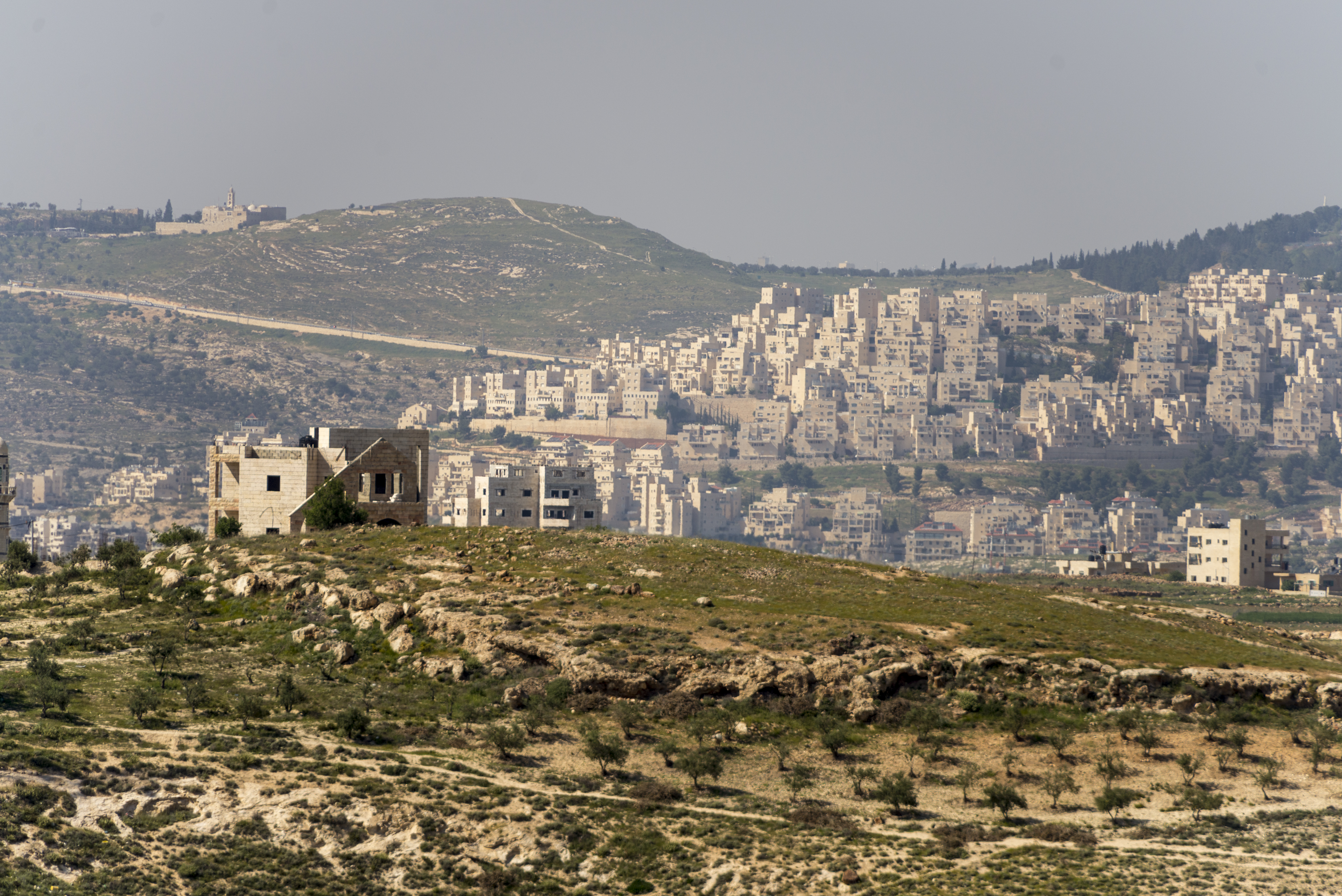
An Israeli settlement in the West Bank.

Israel's prime minister, Benjamin Netanyahu, and his right-wing Likud party do not have a coherent stance on the status of the West Bank. In 2009, Netanyahu endorsed the two-state solution, but before the April 2019 Israeli legislative election, he stated his intention of unilaterally annexing Israeli settlements in the West Bank. However, since this was a throwaway remark made without addressing the international opposition to such an action, it is unclear whether Netanyahu intended to follow through. On 16 September 2019, in an interview with Israeli Army Radio, Netanyahu said "I intend to extend sovereignty on all the settlements and the (settlement) blocs," including "sites that have security importance or are important to Israel's heritage," including the settlements in Hebron.

The application of Israeli law in the West Bank settlements has been described by commentators as "creeping annexation".

=== Annexation of the Jordan Valley ===
According to B'Tselem, 65,000 Palestinians and about 11,000 Israeli settlers live in the area.

==== 1967 Allon Plan ====
The 1967 Allon Plan

The Allon Plan was a plan to partition the West Bank between Israel and the Hashemite Kingdom of Jordan, create a Druze state in the Israeli-occupied Golan Heights, and return most of the Sinai Peninsula to Arab control. The plan was drafted by Israeli Minister Yigal Allon shortly after the Six-Day War in June 1967. The broad aim of the plan was to annex most of the Jordan Valley from the river to the eastern slopes of the West Bank hill ridge, East Jerusalem, and the Etzion bloc, to Israel. The remaining parts of the West Bank, containing most of the Palestinian population, were to become Palestinian autonomous territory, or would return to Jordan, including a corridor to Jordan through Jericho. The Jordanian King Hussein rejected the plan. Allon died in 1980, and the following year the Israeli government passed the Golan Heights Law, effectively annexing most of the governorate.

==== 2019 Netanyahu Plan ====
September 2019 annexation proposal by Israeli prime minister Benjamin Netanyahu Jordan Valley area to be annexed by Israel Rest of the West Bank, including Jericho

On 10 September 2019, shortly before the Israeli legislative elections, Netanyahu announced his government's plan to annex the Jordan Valley, if it won the election. He also reaffirmed his previous pledge to annex all Jewish settlements throughout the West Bank, but said such a move would not be made before publication of the Trump peace plan and consultations with President Donald Trump. According to Peace Now, the proposal includes 30 settlements with 12,778 settlers, 18 illegal outposts, 15 Area A and B communities, including 44,175 Palestinians planned to remain under the nominal autonomous rule of the Palestinian Authority, surrounded by annexed territory with access roads, described by Peace Now as "..alarmingly similar to the Bantustan formula in former Apartheid South Africa" and 48 shepherding communities in Area C including 8,775 Palestinians. The area to be annexed is about 22% of the West Bank, 90% of which is in Area C and 20% of the land is Palestinian-owned; the map that Netanyahu displayed of the area to be annexed had several errors, incorrectly noting the location of several settlements and omitting Palestinian villages. Netanyahu's map is only a slightly revised version of the Allon Plan map, with the key difference being that the Palestinians are no longer offered access to the international border with Jordan. Netanyahu said that he had received a green light from the United States' Donald Trump administration. The administration said that there had been no change in United States policy.

The next day, there was international condemnation of the proposal from Palestinians, the Arab league, Saudi Arabia, Jordan, Turkey, the UK and the UN, the latter stating "... that any Israeli move to impose its administration over the Palestinian territory would be illegal under international law." Several Israeli politicians from across the political spectrum and Hebrew media outlets described this announcement as a political stunt for votes. Most notably, Moshe Ya'alon, a Knesset Member from the Blue and White party, said that in 2014 Netanyahu agreed in principle to evacuate Jordan Valley settlements. In 2014 Ya'alon was in Netanyahu's Likud Party, serving under Netanyahu as the Minister of Defense. On 13 August 2020, Netanyahu agreed to suspend the plan after signing the Israel–United Arab Emirates peace agreement, brokered by the United States.

=== Annexation of Area C ===
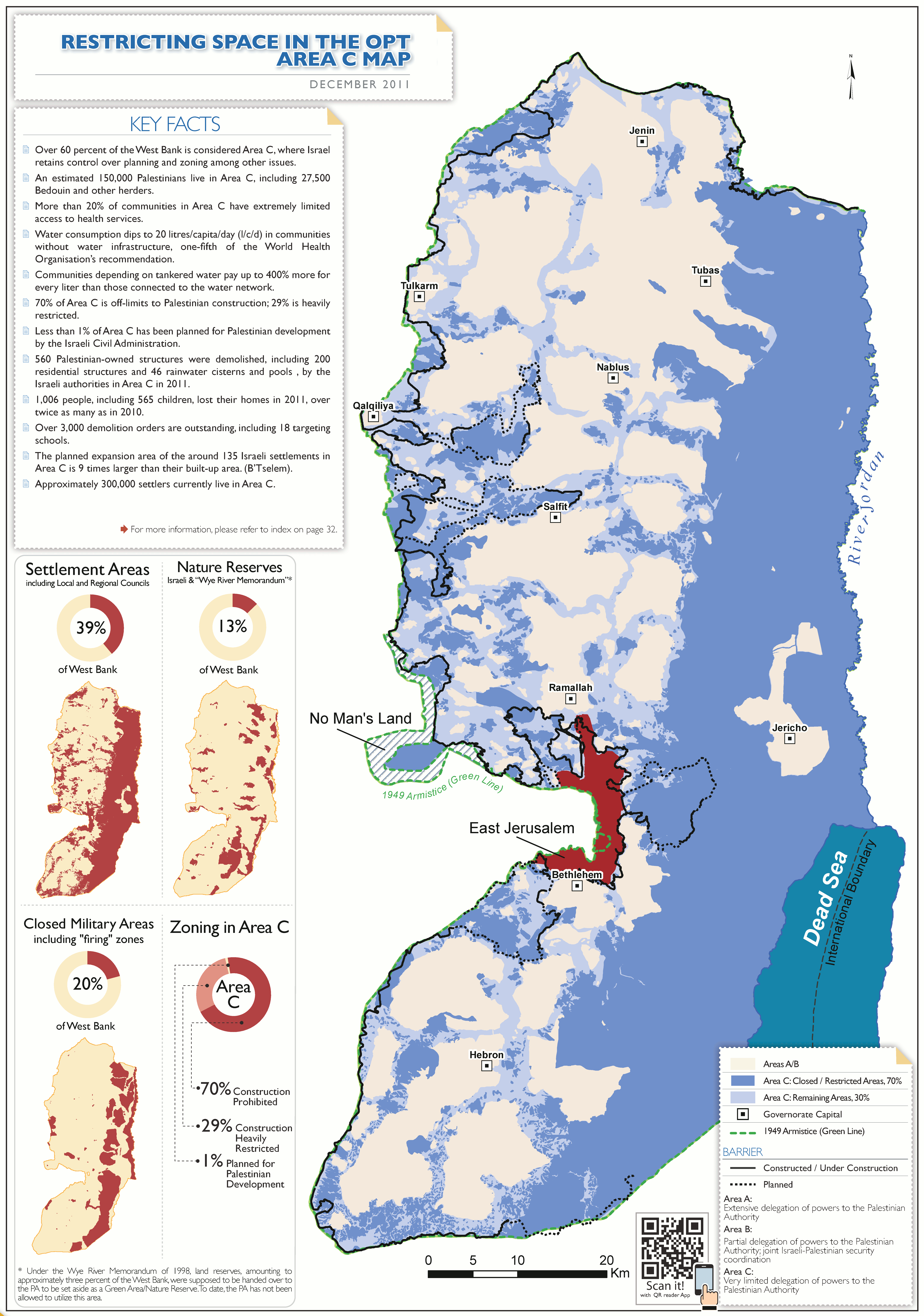
Area C shown in blue.

The West Bank is divided into Area A, B, and C. Area C contains 60% of the West Bank's land area and all Israeli settlements. As of 2013, OCHA estimated that approximately 300,000 Palestinians lived in Area C, compared to an estimated 2.8 million residing in Areas A and B as of 2019. The Jewish Home party's official position is in support of annexing Area C alone, although some of its MKs support annexation of the entire West Bank. Leading up to the April 2019 elections, the New Right party, led by Naftali Bennett, Israeli foreign minister and Ayelet Shaked, justice minister, advocated for the unilateral annexation of Area C. Bennett estimates that his plan would involve offering Israeli citizenship to some 80,000 Palestinians living in Area C, which contradicts the UN estimate of 297,000 Palestinians in Area C.

=== Annexation of the entire West Bank ===
Caroline Glick, a New Right candidate in the April 2019 Knesset elections, supports annexation of the entire West Bank. Glick supports an application process for Israeli citizenship to Palestinians living in annexed areas, and anticipates that not all Palestinians would desire Israeli citizenship or be eligible.

=== Annex according to 2020 Trump peace plan ===
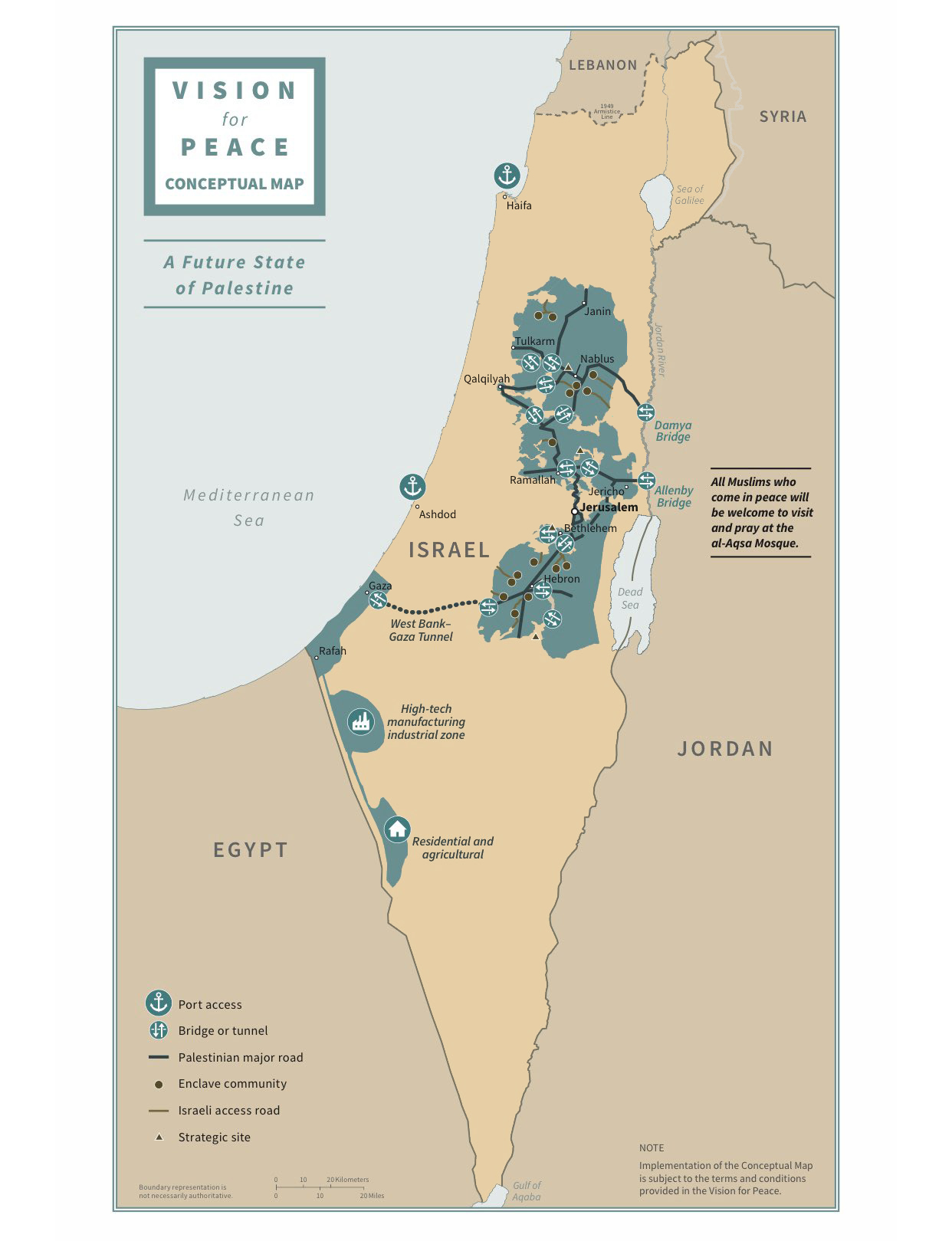
Trump's proposal for peace plan

In April 2020 Barak Ravid, writing in Axios, cited a "senior U.S. official" as saying that any Israeli annexations must come "in the context of an offer to the Palestinians to achieve statehood based upon specific terms, conditions, territorial dimensions and generous economic support." and that "We are prepared to recognize Israeli actions to extend Israeli sovereignty over areas of the West Bank in the context of the Government of Israel agreeing to negotiate with the Palestinians along the lines set forth in President Trump's vision." U.S. Ambassador to Israel David M. Friedman told Netanyahu's aides at a meeting of the U.S.-Israeli mapping committee that is examining potential areas that could be annexed, that "the U.S. wants to implement a peace plan, not an annexation plan".

On 28 May 2020, Netanyahu said he was committed to annexing parts of the West Bank in July once a joint Israeli-U.S. team completes mapping the exact territory based on the conceptual map released by U.S. President Donald Trump's administration. However, the July 2020 annexation plan was later pushed back.

== Movements towards annexation ==
=== 2020 ===
In 2020, on the eve of plans to go forward with a form of annexation, leading figures in the British Jewish establishment, but not the Board of Deputies of British Jews, signed a letter stating that any such annexation would be an "existential threat" both to Israel and Zionists in Great Britain, and have grave consequences for the Palestinians. Among the signatories were Holocaust survivor Sir Ben Helfgott, historians Sir Simon Schama and Simon Sebag Montefiore; former Conservative foreign secretary Sir Malcolm Rifkind; lawyer Anthony Julius; philanthropist Dame Vivien Duffield; scientist Lord Robert Winston; former MP Luciana Berger; Times columnist Daniel Finkelstein, and novelist Howard Jacobson.

On 29 June 2020, it was revealed that Netanyahu's coalition partner Benny Gantz would not accept the proposed 1 July 2020 deadline to start annexing the West Bank. Gantz also announced that he would prefer that the Israeli government deal with the COVID-19 pandemic first. Despite not serving as prime minister, it was reported that Gantz's objection cast doubt on when a new deadline could be set. The same day, U.S. sources confirmed that West Bank annexation would not start by the planned 1 July deadline as well.

In mid-year, a jurist of international law William Schabas filed a request with the International Criminal Court asking that it investigate the architects of the plan, naming Donald Trump, Benjamin Netanyahu, Mike Pompeo and Jared Kushner.

=== 2025 ===
On 23 July 2025, the Knesset passed a resolution supporting Israel's annexation of the West Bank. In October 2025, the annexation bill was granted preliminary passage in a 25–24 vote, but it was opposed by Netanyahu as a "deliberate political provocation by the opposition to sow discord." The bill was condemned by U.S. Vice President JD Vance as a "very stupid political stunt" and by Secretary of State Marco Rubio as "counterproductive" to Trump's Gaza peace plan.

=== 2026 ===
In February 2026, the Israeli government approved a set of measures to register lands in the West Bank as "state property", moving forward with formalizing administrative control over large parts of the area. The Cabinet's decisions establish a procedure for identifying and cataloging privately owned lands, bringing them under state administration, and applying regulatory frameworks to oversee construction, land use, and municipal management. Israeli officials describe these actions as part of a legal and bureaucratic process, representing a coordinated effort among various ministries and agencies to prepare the territory for eventual annexation. The plan is presented as a phased strategy, starting with land registration and regulatory integration, with further steps toward extending sovereignty expected in the coming years.

Israel's decision to classify certain areas in the West Bank as state property has elicited widespread criticism for allegedly violating international legal norms, particularly the Fourth Geneva Convention, which prohibits alterations to the status of occupied territories. Palestinian officials and human rights advocates interpret this measure as an effective annexation that undermines the prospects for a two-state resolution. Legal experts emphasize that unilateral land registration and regulatory measures within occupied territories contravene established international legal principles and have the potential to intensify regional conflicts. The move was condemned by Jordan, Saudi Arabia, and the United Arab Emirates.

== Opinion polling ==
A 2019 Haaretz poll investigated support for annexation among Israelis. According to the survey, 30% did not know, 28% of Israelis opposed any annexation and 15% supported annexing Area C alone. 27% wanted to annex the entire West Bank including 16% who opposed granting political rights to Palestinians and 11% who favored granting political rights.

In April 2020, the Israeli Vote Index found that 52% of Jewish Israelis supported Israel's annexation of the West Bank.

== Opponents ==
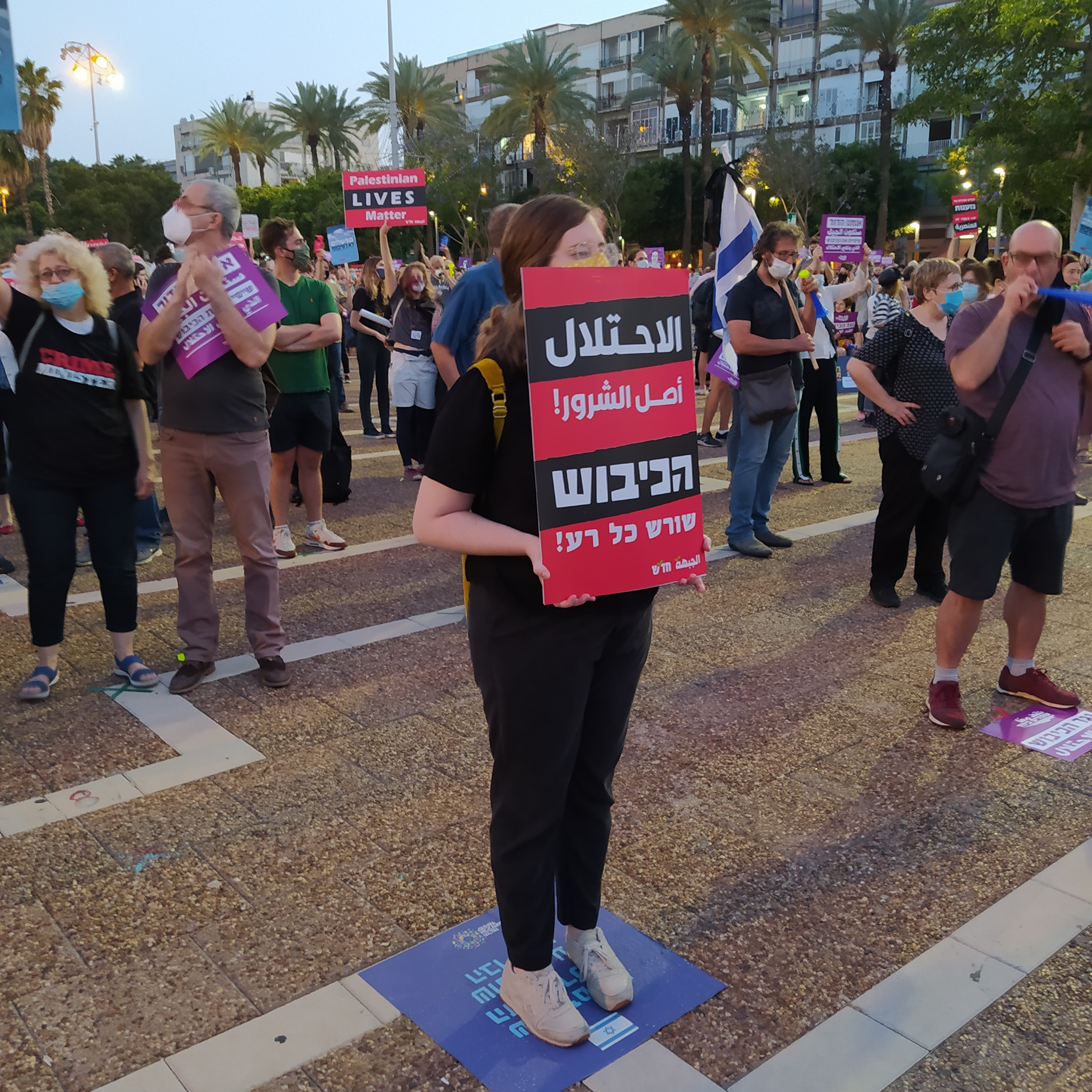
Demonstration against Israeli annexation of the West Bank, Rabin Square, Tel Aviv-Yafo, 6 June 2020

In 2014, Yesh Atid leader Yair Lapid said that his centrist party would leave the governing coalition and topple the government if any West Bank settlements were annexed. Tzipi Livni, leader of the centrist Hatnuah party, also said that Hatnuah would leave the coalition in the event of annexation. However, both parties support annexation of the settlement blocs after a permanent resolution of the conflict has been negotiated. Yisrael Beytenu supports redrawing the borders in order to keep as many Jews as possible within the Jewish state while transferring some Israeli Arab towns to the Palestinian state, with some Jewish settlements in the West Bank to be annexed to Israel.

The left-wing opposition parties, Labor Party and Meretz, also oppose annexation, as do the Arab parties, which insist on Israeli withdrawal to behind the Green Line. Commanders for Israel's Security, an association of retired Israeli military officers, opposes West Bank annexation.

Anshel Pfeffer, Netanyahu's unofficial biographer stated that the Prime Minister had no intention of going through with the plan, which, he argued, was an electoral move to secure more votes. Long-time Israeli critic of the Israel-South Africa apartheid analogy, Benjamin Pogrund, who was born in South Africa, commented that were the proposal enacted, it would be tantamount to implementing an apartheid regime, and stated that his former assessment would therefore change: '[At] least it has been a military occupation. Now we are going to put other people under our control and not give them citizenship. That is apartheid. That is an exact mirror of what apartheid was [in South Africa].'

== International response ==
In June 2019, the first Trump administration indicated that it might not object to the Israeli government's possible annexation of Israeli settlements in the West Bank. Five senators from the opposition Democratic Party introduced a resolution condemning the idea. The Trump administration had earlier recognized Jerusalem as the capital of Israel in December 2018 and recognized the Golan Heights as part of Israel in March 2019. In November, it declared that it did not consider the settlements illegal, but asked Israel to refrain from annexation before the release of the Trump peace plan. In September 2025, the second Trump administration offered assurances to Arab countries that it would not allow Israel to annex the West Bank. Trump added that "Israel would lose all of its support from the United States if that happened."

The West Bank is internationally recognized as militarily occupied by Israel, though Israel disputes this and has created nearly 200 Israeli settlements there. According to Yuval Shany, an Israeli annexation would likely be opposed internationally because the plan would violate multiple principles. Firstly, the principle of territorial integrity, that territories should not be acquired by war, as stated in the preamble to United Nations Security Council Resolution 242, in several U.N. resolutions proclaiming the status of the West Bank as occupied Palestinian territory and in the International Court of Justice's advisory opinion on the Wall. Secondly, it would violate the vision of a two-state solution set forth in the Oslo Accords. Thirdly, the permanent and day-to-day control of a civilian population by a foreign power, denying it the right to naturalize or participate in politics, would perpetuate a democratic deficit.

== See also ==
- Status of territories occupied by Israel in 1967
