= Alon Ben-Meir =

American political scientist and writer

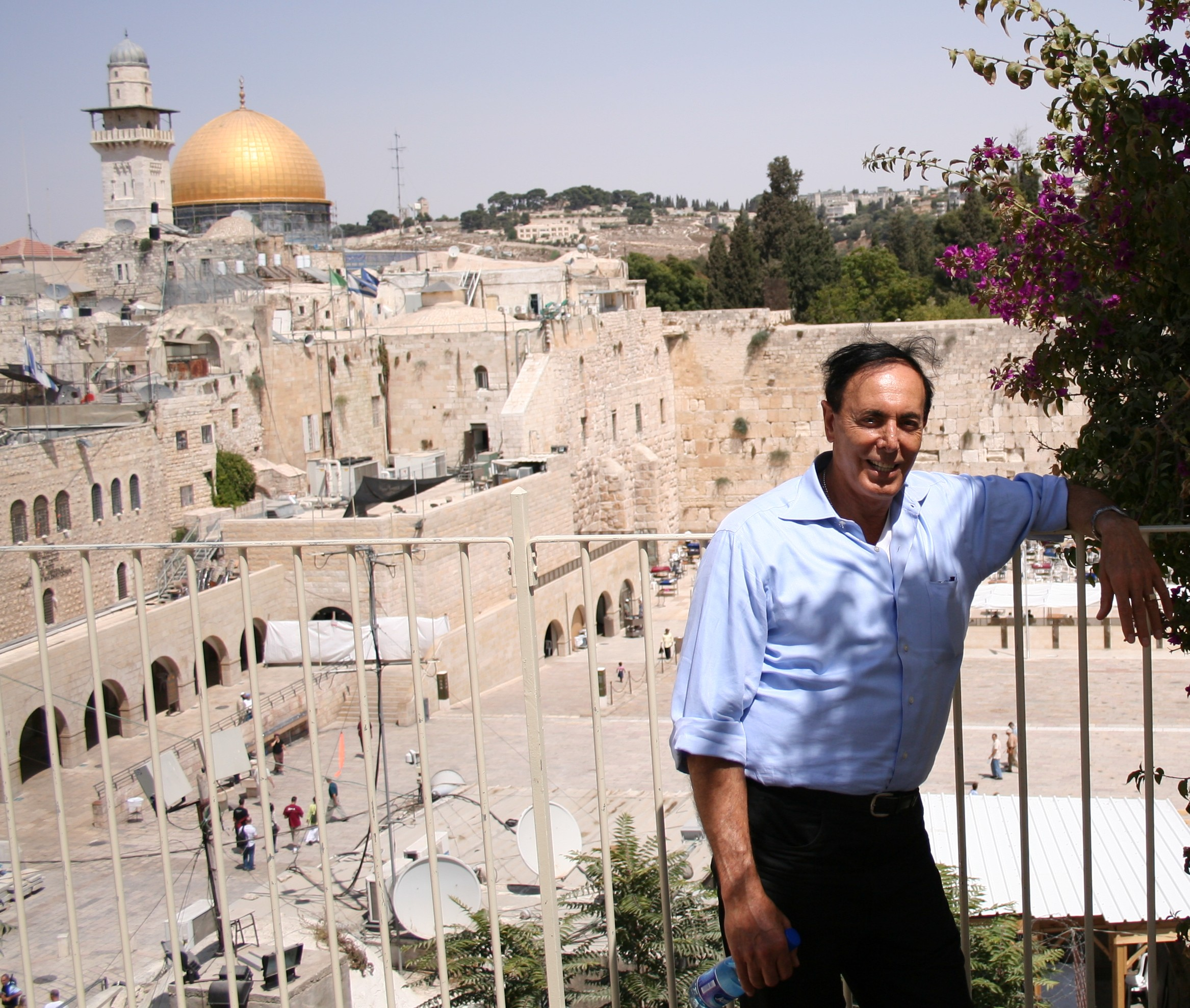
Ben-Meir in Jerusalem. The Temple Mount sits in the background.

Alon Ben-Meir (Hebrew: אלון בן-מאיר; born 1937) is an American expert on Middle East politics and affairs, specializing in peace negotiations between Israel and the Arab states. For the past twenty five years, Ben-Meir has been directly involved in various Track II diplomatic negotiations and is a staunch advocate of the Arab Peace Initiative. He operates regularly as a liaison between Arab, Turkish, and Israeli officials. Also, Ben-Meir serves as senior fellow at New York University's Center for Global Affairs where he has taught courses on the Middle East and international negotiations for 18 years, and he is the Middle East Project Director at the World Policy Institute. He hosts "Global Leaders: Conversations with Alon Ben-Meir," a series of debates and conversations with top policy-makers around the world at NYU. He also regularly holds briefings at the US State Department for international visitors.

Ben-Meir writes weekly articles, including a syndicated column in the Jerusalem Post. His articles appear in various newspapers, magazines and websites including, but not limited to: the Middle East Times, the Christian Science Monitor, Le Monde, American Chronicle, the Political Quarterly, Israel Policy Forum, Gulf Times, the Week, the Peninsula, the Jerusalem Post, the World Policy Journal, and Hurriyet. He also makes regular television and radio appearances, and has been featured on networks such as CNN, FOX, PBS, ABC, Al-Jazeera (English and Arabic), Al-Arabiya, Press TV Iran, NPR and Russia Today. He has authored seven books related to Middle East policy and is currently working on a book about the psychological dimensions of the Israeli-Palestinian conflict.

Often accused of being overly optimistic in his views, notably concerning the Arab-Israeli conflict, Ben-Meir has responded, "There is enough pessimism, pain, and disdain, and I do not choose to add my voice to the chorus of doom.…..I envision a Middle East with Arabs and Jews working and living together to achieve greatness perhaps unknown in human experience. Together, they will usher in a renaissance that will spread its light from sea to sea."

== Biography ==
Ben-Meir was born in 1937 to a Jewish family in Baghdad, Iraq.

== Career ==
=== Education ===
Ben-Meir received his bachelor's degree in journalism at Tel Aviv University, Israel. In addition, at Queen’s College in Oxford University, United Kingdom, he obtained his master's degree in philosophy and his Ph.D. in international relations. He is fluent in English, Arabic and Hebrew.

=== Teaching ===
Ben-Meir is a Senior Fellow of International Relations and Middle Eastern studies at New York University’s Center for Global Affairs. Ben-Meir has taught courses in International Negotiation, Peacemaking and Conflict Resolution, Terrorism and Ethnic Conflict, International Relations in the Post-World War II Era, American Hegemony in the Balance, Ethic in International Affairs, and Middle Eastern studies. Additionally, until 2007, Ben-Meir taught courses at New School University in International Negotiations, Conflict Resolution, History of the Middle East, History and the Struggle of the Middle East from Early 1900 to the Present, Forces Shaping the New World Order, the Middle East in the 21st Century, and American Hegemony in the Balance.

=== Global Leaders: Conversations with Alon Ben-Meir ===
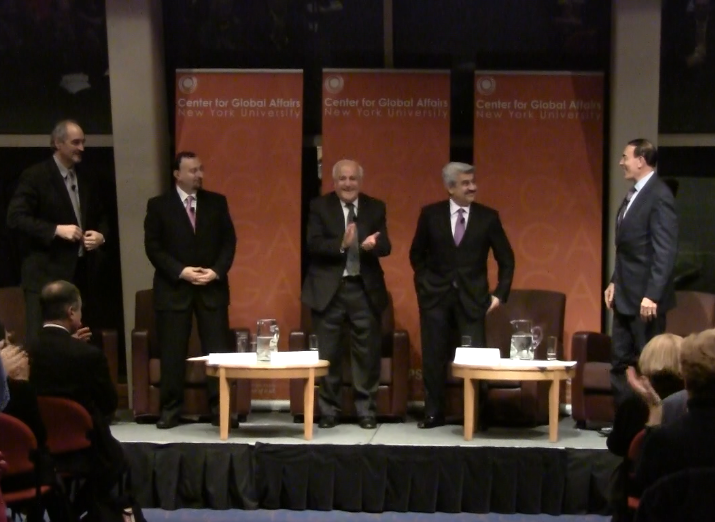
Ben-Meir hosting ambassadors Bashar Jaafari, Khalid al-Nafisee, Hamid al-Bayati, and Riyad Mansour at a "Global Leaders: Discussions with Alon Ben-Meir," on November 30, 2010.

The Global Leaders series events offer the public an opportunity to engage with top policy-makers, officials, and influential thinkers from around the world in an intimate and informal setting. In these sessions, which attract crowds from academia, media, and the general public, Ben-Meir and distinguished guests discuss critical issues facing the international community.

Ben-Meir's guests have included: Turki bin Faisal Al Saud of Saudi Arabia; ambassador Hussein Hassouna of the Arab League; ambassador Zalmay Khalilzad of the U.S. to the United Nations; Ambassador John Bruton, Head of EU Commission to the US; Prince Zeid bin Ra'ad, ambassador of Jordan; Ambassor Urs Ziswiler of Switzerland; ambassador Naser Al Belooshi of Bahrain; ambassador Hamid Al Bayati, PR of Iraq to the United Nations; ambassador Imad Moustapha of Syria; Egyptian ambassador Nabil Fahmy to the U.S.; Turkish ambassador Namik Tan; ambassador Gérard Araud, PR of France to the UN; ambassador Gabriela Shalev of Israel to the UN; ambassador Bashar Jaafari, PR of Syria to the UN; ambassador Khalid al-Nafisee, former PR of Saudi Arabia to the UN; ambassador Riyad Mansour, Permanent Observer of Palestine to the United Nations; and president Mikheil Saakashvili of Georgia.

=== Arab Peace Initiative ===
Ben-Meir is a passionate proponent of the Arab Peace Initiative (API), which aims to create a lasting Israeli-Palestinian peace. In early 2007, he launched a comprehensive campaign to promote the goals and ideas of the Initiative. He frequently speaks at international conferences, dedicates much of his writing to API matters and regularly meets with policy makers from around the world to find allies in an effort to push forward the plan laid out in the API.

=== Track II Diplomacy ===
Ben-Meir regularly engages in Track II diplomacy to enable negotiations between Israeli, Arab, and Turkish officials to achieve greater peace and prosperity. Also, he has actively participated in Israeli-Syrian and Israeli-Palestinian negotiations, and he remains a committed and engaged advocate of the Arab Peace Initiative.

=== Center for Strategic Development ===
Ben-Meir founded the Center for Strategic Development. The center dedicates a large part of its work to the promotion of the Arab Peace Initiative.

== Journalism and media ==
=== Published books ===
- Ben-Meir, Alon. Lost Perspectives. 2009. ISBN 978-1-4389-7167-4
- Ben-Meir, Alon. The Last Option. 2004.
- Ben-Meir, Alon. A War We Must Win. 2004. ISBN 978-1-4107-5781-4
- Ben-Meir, Alon. A Framework for Arab-Israeli Peace. 1993.
- Ben-Meir, Alon. In Defiance of Time. 1980
- Ben-Meir, Alon. Israel - the Challenge of the Fourth Decade. 1978.
- Ben-Meir, Alon. The Middle East: Imperatives and Choices. 1975.
