= King Hussein's federation plan =

1972 plan to establish a Jordanian-Palestinian federation

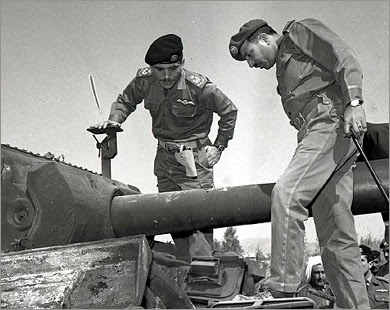
King Hussein (left) inspecting an Israeli tank with Lieutenant General Mashour Haditha Al-Jazy after the Israeli-Jordanian battle of Karameh in 1968

A political program was proposed by King Hussein of Jordan during a speech to Parliament on March 15, 1972 that aimed to establish a Jordanian-Palestinian federation, the "United Arab Kingdom" if Israel conceded the control of East Jerusalem to the Jordanian-Palestinian federation so that it would become the capital of its Palestinian federal district. Hussein's proposal was rejected by most parties involved soon after it was announced.

== Overview ==
On 15 March 1972, King Hussein of Jordan revealed his plan for a "United Arab Kingdom", which would be a federation consisting of two federal districts: the Hashemite Kingdom of Jordan and a Palestinian federal district in the West Bank region that was under Jordanian control between 1948 and 1967, with East Jerusalem being its capital. According to the proposal, the two districts of the federation would be autonomous except for military, foreign affairs and security, which would be run by a central government in Amman.

Nevertheless, King Hussein conditioned the establishment of the United Arab Kingdom in achieving a peace agreement between Israel and Jordan.

Ultimately, King Hussein's proposal was ruled out after it had been rejected by Israel and the PLO, and other Arab states had strongly opposed the plan.

== Reactions ==
=== Palestinians ===
In the eyes of the Palestine Liberation Organization (PLO), the plan meant an end to the Palestinian struggle and a denial of their own objectives. Its strong opposition was expressed in a statement issued by the PLO's executive committee, which met immediately after the plan was announced:

The people of Palestine alone, and in the necessary atmosphere of freedom, can decide on their own future and the future of their cause.... And now the King is revealing himself and his collusion by announcing, though in different words, the birth of this "tiny entity," often bargaining with Israel that he should be a partner in it, in return for concessions in Jerusalem and in the Triangle as regards real sovereignty and, of course, for recognition and peace with Israel, and the creation of a bridge over which it could cross into all parts of the Arab homeland.

The Palestinian National Council went further in calling for the overthrow of King Hussein: "[we must] engage in a struggle to liberate Jordan from the subservient royalist regime which is a mask for the effective Zionist domination of the East Bank and acts as a hired guardian of the Zionist occupation of Palestine".

=== Israel ===
Israel's response was immediate and negative. On the same day that Hussein's announcement was broadcast, the spokesman of the Israeli prime minister, Golda Meir, denied that Israel had any involvement with the plan and described it as "negating the cause of peace" and that it "creates obstacles on the road to its achievement." The Israeli Defense Minister, Moshe Dayan, dismissed the announcement as "mere words, which do not open a pathway to any agreement or solution".

The following day, Golda Meir made a statement to the Knesset where the plan was debated and a resolution passed. The Knesset resolution rejected the plan:

the Knesset has duly noted the Prime Minister's statement of March 16, 1972, regarding the speech made by the King of Jordan on March 11, 1972. The Knesset has determined that the historic right of the Jewish people to the Land of Israel is beyond challenge.

=== Arab states ===
The reaction from the Arab world to King Hussein's proposal was hostile. Most Arab states rejected the idea outright and stated that it had been planned in concert with the United States and Israel to undermine the interests of the Palestinians. They also saw the plan as an attempt by Hussein to sign a unilateral Jordanian peace agreement with Israel, separate from the other Arab states.

Egypt, Syria and Libya were among the harshest critics, Egypt went to the extent of breaking off diplomatic relations with Jordan on April 6, 1972. The President of Iraq, Ahmed Hassan al-Bakr, condemned the plan and announced that "the masses of the Arab world are looking to all of us for unified action against the reactionary plan for surrender to the Zionist enemy". Al-Bakr proposed a Union of Arab Republics instead.

Some Arab states, including Saudi Arabia and Kuwait, did not immediately come out against the proposal, but its rejection by the Arab world was eventually almost universal.

== See also ==
- Jordanian option
- Jordanian disengagement from the West Bank
- Black September

== Sources ==
- The Palestine Question, Henry Cattan, p. 305
- A History of Modern Palestine, Ilan Pappé, p. 211
