= Peres–Hussein London Agreement =

1987 secret treaty between Israel and Jordan on future Arab-Israeli peace talks

The London Agreement between King Hussein of Jordan and Israeli Foreign Affairs Minister Shimon Peres was signed during a secret meeting held at the residence of Lord Mishcon in London on April 11, 1987. Also present in the meeting were Jordanian Prime Minister Zaid al-Rifai and Director General of the Israeli Foreign Affairs Ministry, Yossi Beilin.

== Overview ==
The agreement outlined the framework for an international peace conference hosted by the United Nations, whose purpose would be "the peaceful solution of the Arab–Israeli conflict based on resolutions 242 and 338 and a peaceful solution of the Palestinian problem in all its aspects." The agreement also stipulated that the conference would not impose a solution on the parties, and that the Palestinians would be represented by the Jordanian delegation. Its requirements that all parties accept UNSC Resolutions 242 and 338 as well as renounce violence and terrorism effectively excluded PLO participation. The signatories agreed that their plan would be presented to US Secretary of State George Shultz for its promotion as an American initiative.

Peres, serving as the Foreign Affairs Minister on behalf of the Labor Party in the Israeli National Unity Government, left for the meeting with the approval of Prime Minister Yitzhak Shamir of the Likud. He was hoping the meeting would lead to a breakthrough allowing the promotion of the "Jordanian Option", namely the resolution of the Palestinian issue through Jordanian sovereignty over the entirety or most of the West Bank. Shamir, however, was unenthusiastic about the Jordanian Option and feared that an international conference would force an undesirable solution on Israel. Peres informed him of the agreement on his return to Israel but refused to provide Shamir with a copy and continued to promote it independently. Mistrust between both leaders as well as ideological differences led to Shamir's rejection of the agreement, and subsequently to Peres's failure to approve it in the Israeli cabinet in May. At the same time, Shamir sent Moshe Arens to meet with Shultz and block the peace conference.

Hussein was bitterly disappointed by Peres' inability to implement the agreement, and consequently disengaged from any further initiative to promote a solution to the Arab–Israeli conflict. Following the start of the First Intifada in December 1987, the Jordanian Option became effectively irrelevant, and in July 1988 Hussein announced that Jordan had relinquished any claim to sovereignty over the West Bank. An international peace conference between Israel and the Arab countries was eventually held in Madrid in October 1991, adhering to a framework similar to that agreed by Peres and Hussein in 1987.

== See also ==
- Jordanian option
