= Allon Plan =

1967 plan to distribute the territory around Israel

The Allon Plan (Hebrew: תָּכְנִית אַלּוֹן) was a political proposition that outlined potential next steps for Israel after the 1967 Arab–Israeli War. It was drafted by Israeli politician Yigal Allon following Israel's seizure of territory from Syria, Jordan, and Egypt; the Israeli military had come to occupy Syria's Golan Heights, the Jordanian-annexed West Bank and the Egyptian-occupied Gaza Strip, and Egypt's Sinai Peninsula. Allon advocated a partitioning of the West Bank between Israel and Jordan, the creation of a sovereign state for Druze in the Golan Heights, and the return of most of the Sinai Peninsula to Egypt.

Map showing would-be territorial control under the Allon Plan of 1967

Broader aims of the Allon Plan in partitioning the West Bank were to enable an Israeli annexation of East Jerusalem, the Etzion Bloc, and most of the Jordan Valley (from the Jordan River to the eastern slopes of the hill ridge). All remaining parts of the West Bank, containing the majority of Palestinians, were to be returned to Jordan — connected to the country by a corridor through Jericho — or reorganized as Palestinian autonomous territory. However, the Allon Plan was rejected by Jordanian king Hussein.

Allon died in 1980 and his proposition was never implemented, though the Sinai Peninsula had been returned as part of the Egypt–Israel peace treaty in 1979. In 1981, the Israeli government passed the Golan Heights Law, effectively annexing the territory captured from Syria.

== Territorial implications ==
The Allon Plan was based on the doctrine that Israeli sovereignty over a large part of the Israeli-occupied territories was necessary for Israel's defense. On the other hand, Allon wanted Israel to return populated territories, and most of the Sinai Peninsula as well, to Arab control, in order to progress towards a solution to the Arab-Israeli conflict. The plan was designed to include as few Arabs as possible in the areas claimed for Israel. Israeli leaders ruled out the possibility of incorporating the West Bank Palestinian population into a greater Israel because it would have dramatically changed the state's Jewish demographic orientation.

Yigal Allon presented the plan when he served as Minister of Labor under Mapai Prime Minister Levi Eshkol. According to the Allon Plan, Israel would annex most of the Jordan Valley, from the river to the eastern slopes of the West Bank hill ridge, East Jerusalem, and the Etzion bloc. At the same time, the heavily populated areas of the West Bank hill country, together with a corridor that included Jericho, would be offered to Jordan.

The plan also included the creation of a Druze state in Syria's Quneitra Governorate, including the Israeli-occupied Golan Heights, similar to the Druze state that existed 1921–1936.

=== Jordanian sovereignty or Palestinian autonomy ===
After the Six-Day War, Israeli leaders considered two possibilities to end the occupation: either the "Jordanian option", holding the transfer of control for most of the territory of the West Bank to the Jordanian monarch, or alternatively the "Palestinian option", under which the Palestinians would get autonomy or an independent state.

The majority of the Government, including Yigal Allon, favored the Palestinian option. In June 1967, according to journalist Reuven Pedatzur, writing in 2007 in an article in Haaretz, Allon expressed caution over the Jordanian option and declared that

The last thing we must do is to return one inch of the West Bank. We must not view Hussein as existing forever – today it is Hussein, but tomorrow it is Nabulsi, and the day after that some Syrian will take hold of them and following that they will make a defense pact with the Soviet Union and China and we'll find ourselves in a much more difficult position. We are talking about a matter that is not forever, and we are placing it on a phenomenon that is flesh and blood, and perhaps will remain for a maximum of 60 years, if he does not get shot before that.

Allon said that he was

taking the maximum possibility. Not a canton, not an autonomous region, but an independent Arab state agreed on between us and them in an enclave surrounded by Israeli territory – independent even in its foreign policy.

In July 1967, Prime Minister Levi Eshkol stated that there was no choice in order to ensure Israel's security needs but to continue to control the entire area as far as the Jordan River, militarily. But in order to avoid turning Israel into a bi-national state, the Arab citizens of the West Bank should be granted a special status. A quasi-independent autonomous region was the first option.

=== Presentation ===
On 27 July 1967, Allon presented the first version of his plan based on the Palestinian option, which included Palestinian autonomy in the West Bank. The autonomous region consisted of two large enclaves, separated by the Greater Jerusalem area, from Israel in the west to the Jordan Valley in the east. A vast majority of the ministers rejected the plan when it was brought before the plenary session of the government on 30 July.

At the beginning of 1968, Allon abandoned the Palestinian option and instead adopted the Jordanian option. He adapted the Allon Plan by adding a corridor between the West Bank and Jordan through the Jericho area, proposing that the Jordan Valley remain in Israeli hands along with Gush Etzion, part of the Hebron foothills and East Jerusalem. All the remainder would be handed over to King Hussein. Most of the members of the Government then backed the Allon Plan as the basis of the policy.

== Diplomatic efforts ==
From February to September 1968, Eshkol held secret talks with Palestinian leaders in the Occupied Territories without result. Parallel to the talks, secret conversations with Jordan started in London in May 1968, ending in November that year. Although the Allon Plan was never officially endorsed by the successive Israeli Cabinets, the peace plan Israel offered to King Hussein in September 1968 was based on it. The conditions included demilitarization of the West Bank, deployment of Israeli troops in the Jordan Valley, and Israeli annexation of a 10 to 15 kilometers-wide strip of land along the Jordan River (the border with Jordan), most of the Judean desert along the Dead Sea, and East Jerusalem. The arrangements were to be valid for generations to come. Hussein, however, rejected the plan. He stuck to UN Resolution 242, including the statement that territories cannot be acquired by force. While Israel would remain military control over all of the West Bank and annex about one-third of the territory, Jordan would get political control over the remaining two-thirds. Eventually King Hussein broke off the talks. Israel wanted to keep Gaza, but did not rule out discussions on its future. The return of East Jerusalem was not open for discussion.

== Basis for Israel's settlement policy ==
During the first decade of the occupation, the Israeli settlement policy was largely based on the Allon Plan. As the Plan propagated a security doctrine, the Jordan River marked the strategic border of Israel, serving as a buffer zone between Israel and the "Eastern Front". Settlements built in the Jordan Valley were designed as permanent advance-position lookouts in the 15 kilometers-wide strip along the Jordan Valley and Judean Desert to be annexed by Israel. Settlements in the Jordan Valley, which are typically agricultural settlements, are primarily located along two major north-south bypass roads: the Allon Road in the western and Route 90 in the eastern Jordan Valley. The Palestinians see the Jordan Valley, the most fertile part of the West Bank with important water resources, as the breadbasket for the future Palestinian State.

In June 1967, Israel de facto annexed East Jerusalem and surrounding parts of the West Bank by incorporating the areas into the Jerusalem Municipality, although it carefully avoided using the term annexation. In the following years, extensive construction of settlements took place in the Greater Jerusalem area, resulting in a ring of Israeli settlements that separates Jerusalem from the rest of the West Bank.

During and after the failed 2013-14 Israeli-Palestinian peace negotiations, renewed discussions appeared in the press about ideas from Israeli politicians to annex Area C. Area C includes the Jordan Valley, but encloses a much larger area.

=== Corridor to Hebron ===
While Hebron was predestined in the Allon Plan to be part of the Palestinian autonomous region, in 1968 Israel made it clear to Jordan that apart from the annexation of the Jordan Valley, it also wanted a strip of territory running to the Hebron area. Two years later, the Labor Government approved the building of the Kiryat Arba settlement, just outside the eastern municipality border. Kiryat Arba both marked the western border of the Israeli-claimed territory in the Allon Plan and blocked the Palestinian build-up area of Hebron in the east. In the following years Jewish settlements were established at the southern outskirts of the Old City. In 1994, Israel closed the Palestinian shops in Al-Shuhada Street and prohibited Palestinian access. In the years from 2002, the Worshippers Way from Kiryat Arba to the Cave of the Patriarchs was built. With the creation of a Palestinian-free route between Kiryat Arba and the Shuhada region, the planned strip from the Jordan Valley to Hebron was finished.

== Israeli political opinions ==
On 18 May 1973, the American Embassy in Israel sent a diplomatic cable to the Secretary of State in Washington DC on the subject of then-Defence Minister "Dayan's Thinking on Possible Peace Arrangements with Jordan and Egypt". The cable contained accounts of discussions with Dayan's close political ally, Deputy Transportation Minister Gad Yaacobi, that Dayan was preparing to expand the autonomy of Arab municipalities in the former West Bank of Jordan, which Israel had captured from Jordan in the Six-Day War. According to Yaacobi, Dayan was "preparing" for a greater "degree of autonomy for West Bank municipalities", while Dayan envisaged the "rest of the West Bank population though living under Israeli sovereignty as being fullfledged Jordanian citizens", with the exception of Ramallah's and Bethlehem's inhabitants, "who would become Israeli citizens." Yaacobi further stated that the media had misrepresented Dayan as being prepared to return most, if not all, of the West Bank to Jordan; he was not. Dayan felt it was important for Israelis to settle outside the lines of the Allon Plan, though not within Arab municipalities. The Greater Jerusalem area should be expanded to include Ramallah and Bethlehem, with Israeli citizenship granted its Arab inhabitants. Dayan envisaged a metropolitan Nablus-Jenin complex under the sovereignty of "the Arab nation east of the Jordan", an enclave smaller than the one outlined in the Allon Plan, and, unlike the provisions of the Allon Plan, internal security responsibilities would fall on the Israeli military in cooperation with Arab police.

== Gaza Strip under Israel or Jordan/Palestine ==
In the initial version of the Allon Plan, he envisioned the Gaza Strip being annexed to Israel. In a subsequent revision of the plan, however, Allon conceived of Gaza as part of a Jordanian-Palestinian state.

== See also ==
- Jordanian option
- United Nations Security Council Resolution 242 (1967)
- Camp David Accords (1978)
  - Egypt–Israel peace treaty (1979)
- Israel–Jordan peace treaty (1994)
