= Michal Nagen =

- מיכל נגן
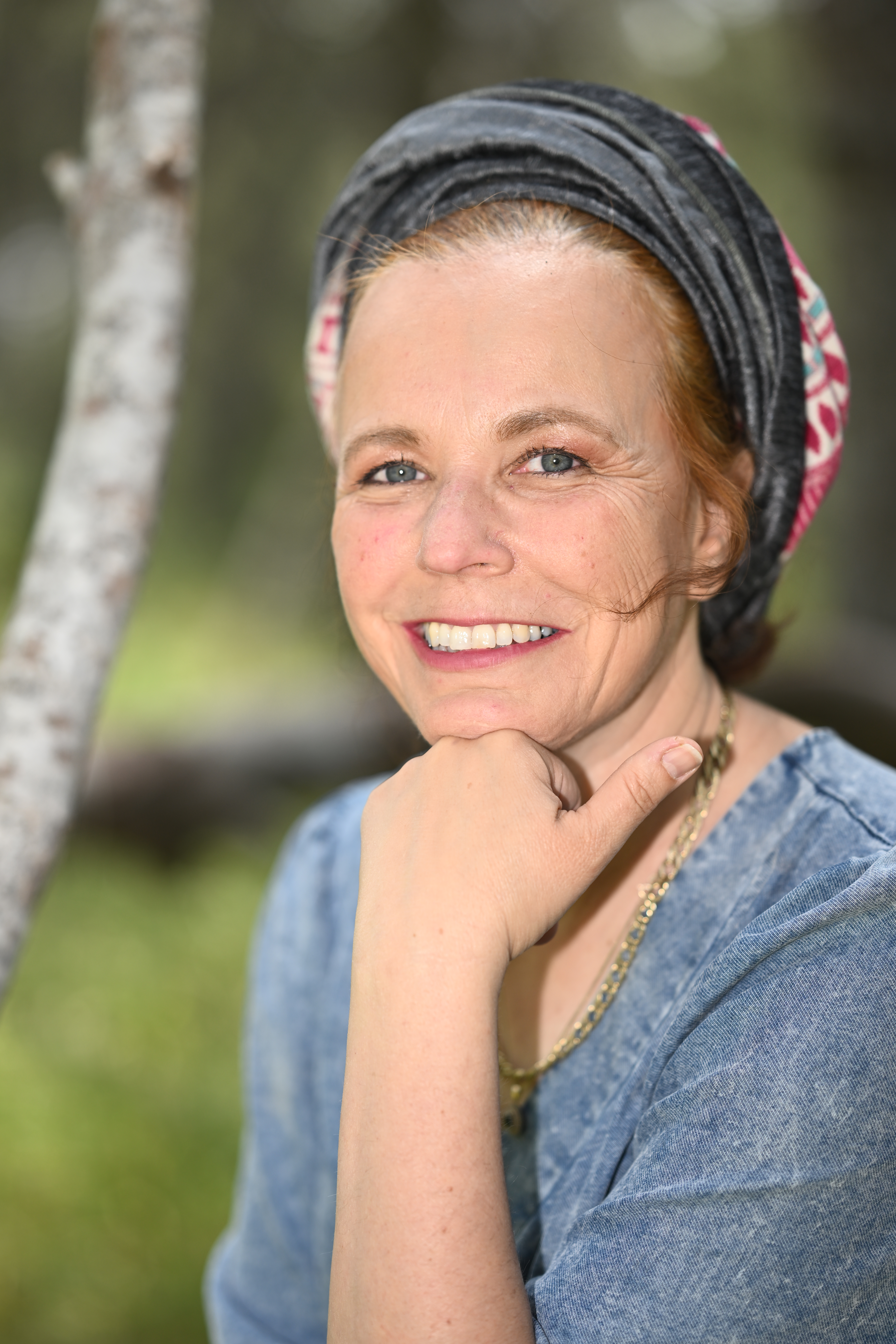
- Born: 1968 (age 57–58)

Michal Nagen (Hebrew: מיכל נגן) is an Israeli Rebbetzin, teacher, doula and actress in the Rachel Keshet Theater Ensemble. Head of Mechint Tzahali.

== Biography ==
Nagen is the daughter of biblical researcher and commentator Uriel Simon, and granddaughter of Israel Prize laureate and co-founder of Brit Shalom, Ernst Simon. Nagen joined the army and served in the Education and Youth Corps. After graduating from the officers' training course, she continued her service as a teaching officer. She studied at Michlelet Bruria. Nagen holds a MA degree in History of Contemporary Jewry from the Hebrew University of Jerusalem. She was a teacher at the Pelech High School in Jerusalem, which was considered the first religious-feminist high school in Israel.

She is the head of Mechinat Zahali for girls who wish to prepare themselves for military service. In Zahali she teaches various classes on faith, education, relationships and femininity. She defines herself as a post-feminist. In March 2017 she signed a letter written by rabbis against the involved service of men and women in combat units. The next day, IDF Spokesperson and commander of Manpower Directorate, Major General Moti Almoz, arrived to Mechinat Zahali in order to speak with Nagan.

In 1993, Nagen married Yakov Nagen, an Israeli Rabbi and author. They have seven children.
