= Yakov Nagen =

American-Israeli rabbi

Yakov Meir Nagen
- יעקב מאיר נגן
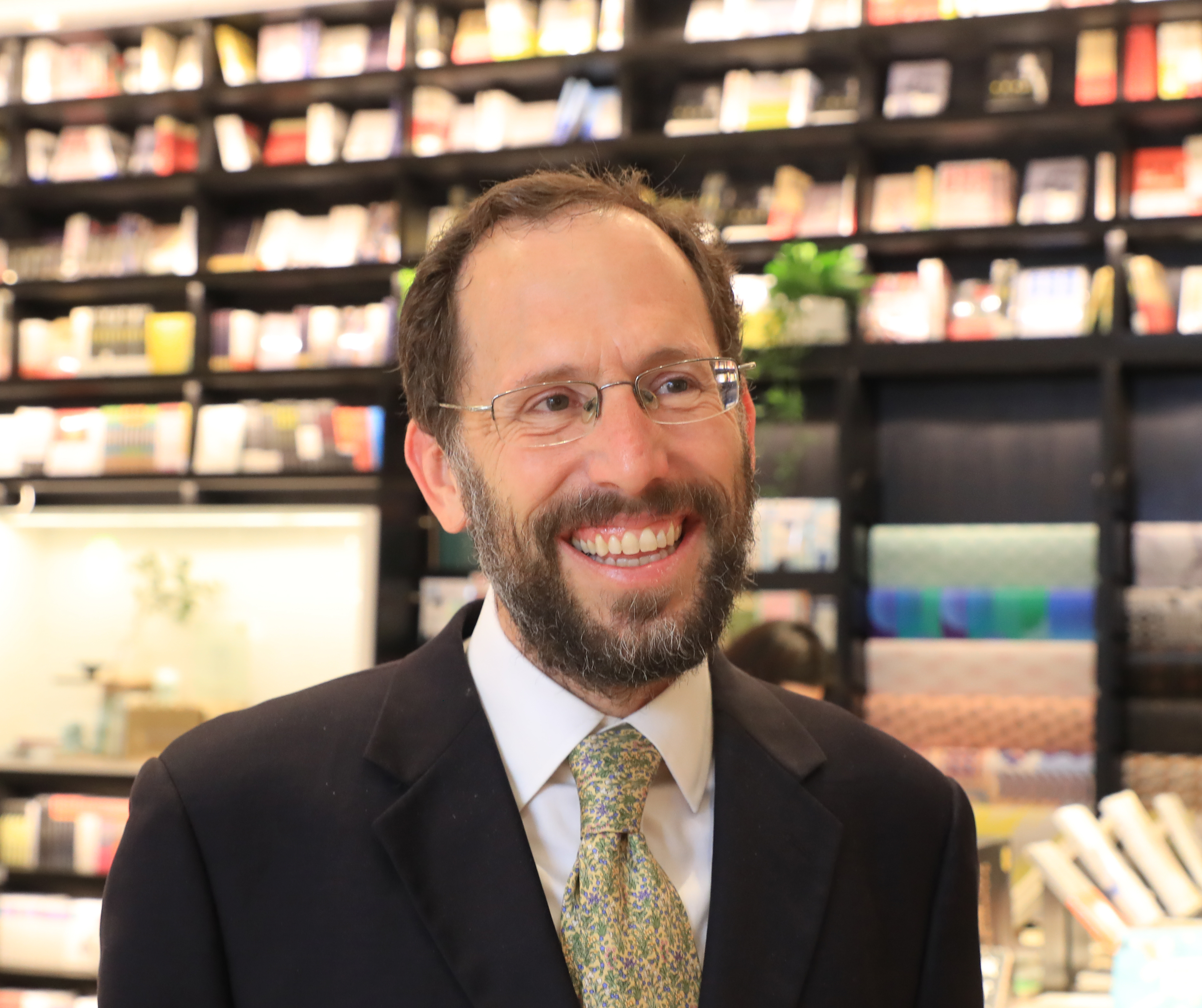
- Rabbi Yakov Nagen
- Born: June 17, 1967 (9 Sivan 5727); Manhattan, New York, United States
- Spouse: Michal Nagen
- Children: 7
- Parent(s): Azriel Genack (m); Ahuva Genack (f)

Yakov Meir Nagen (Hebrew: יעקב מאיר נגן; born June 17, 1967) is an American-Israeli rabbi and author. Nagen is a leader in interfaith dialogue and in particular interfaith peace initiatives between Judaism and Islam. He is the president of the Jerusalem Interfaith Center and the director of Ohr Torah Stone’s Blickle Institute for Interfaith Dialogue. Nagen is also a senior educator at Yeshivat Otniel. His writings address Jewish philosophy, Talmud, spirituality, and interfaith relations.

== Biography ==
=== Early life ===
Nagen was born in Manhattan, New York to Ahuva and Azriel Genack. After completing high school in the United States, he studied in Israel at Yeshivat Shaalvim. Nagen returned to the US to study at Yeshiva University where he received a bachelor's degree in Judaic studies and a master's degree in Jewish history in addition to rabbinic ordination. In 1993 he moved to Israel and studied at Yeshivat Har Etzion and in 1997 joined the faculty at Yeshivat Otniel.

In 2004 Nagen received a doctoral degree in Jewish philosophy at the Hebrew University. His dissertation dealt with the interplay between Halacha and Aggada, Kabbala and philosophy in the context of the holiday of Sukkot. Nagen's interdisciplinary approach towards Talmudic literature is developed his books: "Water, Creation and Revelation – Sukkot in the philosophy of halacha (Geloy, 2008) and "The Soul of the Mishna - a literary reading and search for meaning" (Dvir, 2016)

=== Interfaith activity ===
In 2006, Nagen traveled to India in the context of his research about the relationship between Judaism and eastern spirituality. Nagen see Judaism as incorporating elements both of Eastern and Western philosophy, as he presents in his book "Waking up to a new day – a renewed reading of Torah and life" (Maggid, 2013). In 2019 the book appeared in English as "Be, Become, Bless – Jewish Spirituality between East and West" (Maggid). Nagen is a leader in interfaith encounters in Israel and the Palestinian Authority between Jewish and Muslim leaders. In wake of his colleague, Rabbi Menachem Froman, Nagen believes that as religion is at the heart of the problem in the conflicts in the Middle East, religion must also be part of the solution.

Through the Interfaith Encounter Association (IEA) he coordinates a group of West Bank rabbis that meet regularly with Muslim sheikhs and imams, mostly from the Hebron and Ramallah areas. He is the co-chairman of the board of the Abrahamic Reunion (AR). The Abrahamic Reunion is composes of representatives of four Abrahamic religions: Jews, Muslims, Christians and Druze, and is dedicated to promoting peace in the Middle East. Nagen represented the organization at the 2015 Parliament of the World’s Religions in Salt Lake City. In August 2026, Nagen was appointed Co-Chair of the Interreligious Council of the Abrahamic Movement.

A photograph of Nagen hugging Haj Ibrahim Ahmad Abu el-Hawa appeared in Google's "Year in Search 2014"

After the murder of the Dawabsheh family in Duma, Nagen was an organizer of the prayer vigil for the victims and outcry against the violence.

In March 2016 Nagen visited Al-Azhar University in Cairo and Fayyum to promote mutual respect between Islam and Judaism.

In 2016 Nagen was profiled in Tablet Magazine as one of the 10 "Israeli Rabbis You Should Know". Nagen is active in spreading Judaism in China in the context of the "Shofer from Zion" organization. Many of his writings have been translated into Chinese and in 2017 he gave lecture series in Beijing and Shanghai.

In 2020 Nagen was appointed as the director of the Ohr Torah Stone network's Blickle Institute for Interfaith Dialogue and the Beit Midrash for Judaism and Humanity.

In 2022 a compendium of the research in the Beit Midrash for Judaism and Humanity, was published as “God Shall be One: Reenvisioning Judaism’s Relation to Other Religions". The book creates a new paradigm for Judaism’s halakhic and philosophical approach toward other religions. Nagen envisions a rapprochement between Judaism and Islam parallel to the processes that have taken place between Judaism and Christianity such as in Nostra aetate (“In Our Time”), the 1965 declaration of the Second Vatican Council in Rome regarding Judaism. He is also part of the N7 initiative which seeks to broaden and deepen normalization between Israel and Arab and Muslim countries, in which Nagen focuses on the interfaith component.

Nagen’s work combines religious scholarship with practical interfaith engagement, with particular emphasis on developing theological and educational foundations for Jewish–Muslim relations. His monograph, Jewish–Muslim Religious Fraternity, been disseminated in seven languages, presents a source-based vision of relations grounded not only in tolerance but also in shared religious narratives and identities. Nagen has presented this message at numerous international conferences and events in collaboration with Muslim partners worldwide. Nagen believes this will be a critical component for advancing peace and stability in the Middle East and for strengthening the Abraham Accords.

Nagen is also a member of the Tzohar and Beit Hillel organizations, rabbinical organizations that focus on the relations between the religious and secular communities in Israel.

At the 2025 G20 Interfaith Forum in Cape Town, Nagen and Imam Talib Shareef presented a vision for Jewish-Muslim religious fraternity calling sustained Jewish-Muslim dialogue, study and cooperation.

== Personal life ==
In 1993 Nagen married Michal, head of the Tzahali pre-army seminary and daughter of Professor Uriel Simon. The couple lives in Jerusalem and have seven children.

== Published works ==
- 2007 "The Soul of the Mishna - window to the inner world of the Mishna", Geloy (in Hebrew)
- 2008 "Water, Creation and Revelation – Sukkot in the philosophy of halacha, Geloy (in Hebrew)
- 2013 "Waking up to a new day – a renewed reading of Torah and life", Maggid (in Hebrew)
- 2016 "The Soul of the Mishna - a literary reading and search for meaning", Dvir (in Hebrew)
- 2019 "Be, Become, Bless – Jewish Spirituality between East and West", Maggid (in English)
- 2019 "Life as Story - Seeing the World with New Eyes", Geloy (in Hebrew)
- 2020 "The Soul of Mishna", Maggid (in English)
- 2021 "Loving the World - Stories of Judaism and Humanity", Geloy (in Hebrew)
- 2022 "God Shall be One: Reenvisioning Judaism’s Relation to Other Religions", Maggid (in Hebrew: English translation 2024)
- 2023 "Healing the Middle East: Interfaith Initiatives for Peace and Coexistences", Blickle Institute (in English)
- 2024 "Jewish-Muslim Religious Fraternity: A Renewed Paradigm for a Shared Future", (English, Hebrew, Arabic, Persian, etc.), Ohr Torah Interfaith Center
- 2025 "That They May Live Among You: Minorities in a Jewish State: An Ethic of Responsibility and Partnership", Maggid (in Hebrew)
