= Israel Jacob Kligler =

Israeli microbiologist

- ישראל יעקב קליגלר
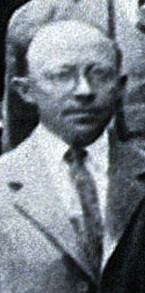
- 1928 in Geneva
- Born: 24 April 1889; Kopychyntsi, Galicia, Austro-Hungarian Empire
- Died: 23 September 1944 (aged 56); Netanya, Mandatory Palestine
- Resting place: Mount of Olives, Jerusalem
- Occupation: Microbiologist
- Known for: Eradication of Malaria and Pioneer in Public Health
- Spouse: Helen (Ahuva) Friedman
- Children: David Aaron Kligler MD
- Parent(s): Aaron Kligler and Fruma (née Fajgel Gittman)

Israel Jacob Kligler (Hebrew: ישראל יעקב קליגלר; 24 April 1889 – 23 September 1944) was a microbiologist, Zionist and humanist. Kligler was born in the Austro-Hungarian Empire, educated in the United States and spent most of his career in Mandatory Palestine, but died before the creation of the State of Israel.

Kliger was one of the first four professors of the Hebrew University and the founder of Department of Hygiene and Bacteriology of the university, which he headed until his death in 1944. As one of the pioneers of modern medical research in Mandatory Palestine, his interests lay in a wide range of disciplines, including Parasitology, Virology, Nutrition, Epidemiology and Public Health.

Kliger developed the Kligler Iron Agar medium for the isolation and identification of intestinal bacteria, which is still in use today.

Kligler's was a key contributor to the eradication of malaria in Mandatory Palestine, a mission completed after his death.

== Biography ==
Israel Jacob Kligler was born in the town of Kopychyntsi, then in Galicia, part of the Austro-Hungarian Empire, and today in western Ukraine. He was the son of Aaron Kligler and Fruma (née Fajgel Frima Silberman). His mother died before Israel's eighth birthday, and his father subsequently remarried Sara. In 1900, his father immigrated to the US with his two older daughters, followed in September 1901 by his wife Sara and the other children, including Israel Jacob.

Kligler attended New York City public schools and earned his Bachelor of Science degree with distinction from the City College of New York in 1911. He continued his studies in Bacteriology, Pathology and Biochemistry at Columbia University: M.A (1914), Ph.D. (1915). The focus of his Ph.D. thesis was oral bacteria with special attention to dental caries.

In parallel to his studies Kligler started working as an assistant in the Department of Public Health at the American Museum of Natural History in New York (1911–1915). He left New York in 1916 and worked for a few months as a Fellow in the Department of Bacteriology of Northwestern University School of Medicine, Chicago. In August 1916, he returned to New York where he joined The Rockefeller Institute for medical research until 1920. At Rockefeller, Kligler conducted research commissioned by the Board of Directors on soil contamination, rural sanitation and intestinal bacteria. In 1918, he was drafted into the US Army and served as an instructor of bacteriology in the military station located at the Rockefeller Institute. Kligler became a member of the Yellow Fever Commission, and at the end of World War I was sent by the Rockefeller Institute to Mexico and Peru (1919/1920) where he served as the deputy of the head of the delegation, the bacteriologist Hideyo Noguchi. Soon after returning from South America, Kligler left the Rockefeller Institute and the US for Palestine, arriving in Eretz Israel in early 1921 as part of the Third Aliyah. However, he retained working contacts with the Rockefeller Foundation, and in 1926, before joining the Hebrew University in Jerusalem, he took part in a yellow fever mission organized by the Rockefeller Foundation to West Africa.

=== Aliyah to Palestine ===
In his youth, Kligler had joined the Zionist movement in the USA. Many years later, he wrote after the death of US Supreme Court Justice Louis D Brandeis:

"The Jewish youth in 1910 considered Brandeis as a hero, someone whom we admired and worked for. When we had learned that he had accepted to head the Zionist Federation in the United States, we, the Zionist pupils, were extremely enthusiastic. The fact that a man who symbolised the finer side of life in the USA was eager to share his destiny with his people; it was like a dream that became a reality."

Towards the end of World War I, Henrietta Szold and the Hadassah organization established the "American Zionist Medical Unit" (AZMU). Kligler, who had dreamt for a long time of making 'Aliyah', wanted to be in the first professional medical health group that arrived in Palestine in July 1918, to help the Jews after the misery experienced during the war. Szold and Simon Flexner, the first director of the Rockefeller Institute for Medical Research (1901–1935), convinced Kligler to stay at the Rockefeller Institute to gain experience and training for the tasks that awaited him in Eretz Israel. Based on his personal correspondence, after returning from South America Kligler wrote to Szold on 20 July 1920: "I believe I am ready now." At the end of October 1920, a party was held at the Rockefeller Institute, to which the heads, managers and researchers came to say goodbye to a highly promising young researcher, who was about to leave for a remote country where scientific work had hardly taken place. In January 1921, Kligler arrived in the Holy Land, and began working as a manager of the laboratories of the Hadassah Hospital in Jerusalem, located then in Prophets Street.

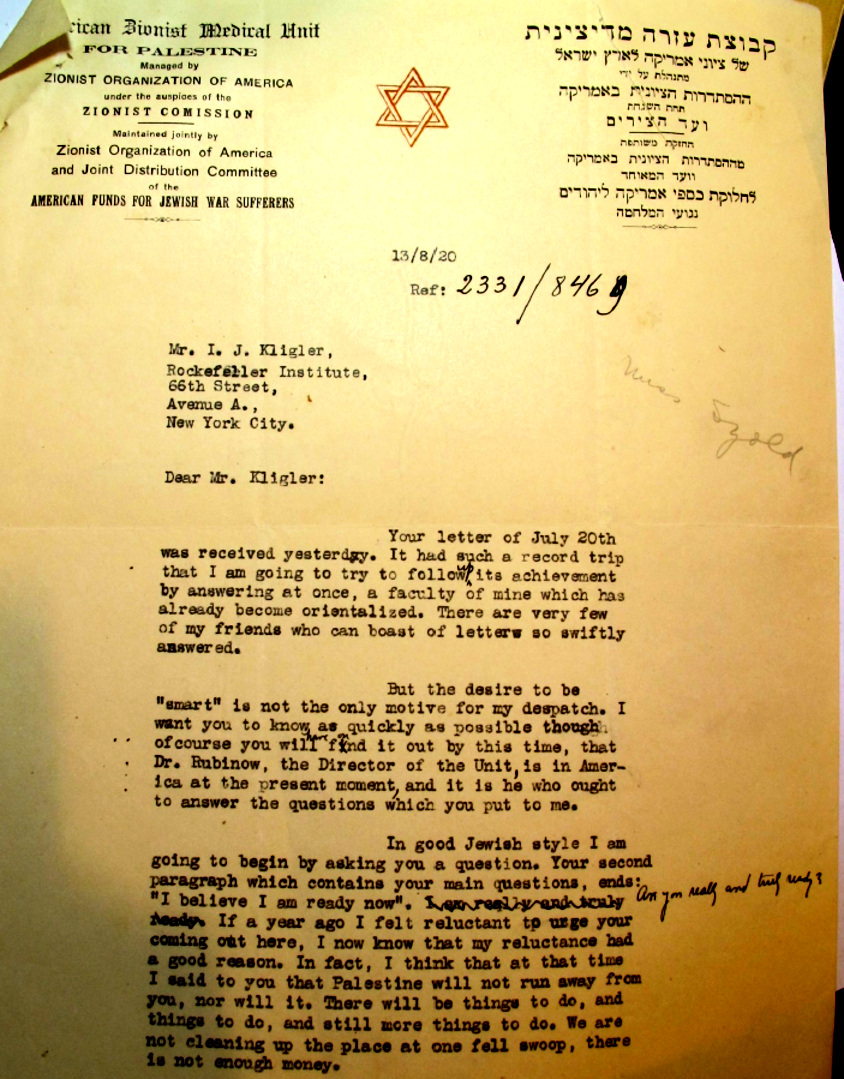
Henrietta Szold's reply to Jacob Kligler's "I believe I am ready now", 13 August 1929 (in part)

In Jerusalem Kligler met his wife Helen (Ahuva) Friedman, who was born in Kisvarda, Hungary on 1 November 1890. Helen studied for three years at the Lebanon Hospital, New York and became a registered nurse in 1914. During World War I, Helen volunteered for the American Expeditionary Forces (AEF), and after the war she volunteered for the AZMU and arrived at the Hadassah Hospital in 1919. Israel Kligler and Helen were married in The Bronx, New York on 11 November 1922, and spent their honeymoon on the way back to Palestine on the deck of the biggest ship of that time, RMS Majestic, leaving New York 16 December 1922. The new family moved to Haifa where Israel Kligler directed the Malaria Research Unit, which was established by the "Joint Distribution Committee" in September 1922 and was attached to the Health Department of Palestine. Helen became a supervisor on behalf of the Hadassah organization for the prenatal care of the women of Haifa. Later in November 1931 Helen became a member of the Social Work Council in Palestine together with Szold, Dr Helena Kagan, Rachel Katznelson-Shazar and others.

In 1925, Kligler was invited by Dr Judah Leon Magnes of the Hebrew University, which had just opened, to join the university. Kligler agreed, and on 1 April 1926 began work at the university. He established the Department of Hygiene and Bacteriology, which he directed until his death from a heart attack in Netanya, Mandatory Palestine on 23 September 1944. He was buried in the cemetery on Mount of Olives, Jerusalem. Helen died in New York January 1979. Their only child David was born 28 March 1926. David Aaron Kligler MD, MPH was devoted to the Children's Evaluation and Rehabilitation Center at the Albert Einstein College of Medicine and was involved with the development of the Speech and Hearing Program in New York. David died on 30 December 1979, and he is buried on the Mount of Olives close to the common grave presumed to contain his father's remains.

== Scientific and medical career ==
Kligler began publishing research papers at the age of 24, immediately after his graduation. His studies at that time dealt with the classification of bacteria and their biochemical properties. He used his knowledge of their growth needs in order to develop a new medium – 'Kligler Iron Agar', for which he gained an international reputation. His scientific research philosophy was that basic research must also be applied, useful and relevant and that scientific research must not be conducted for its own sake but to make a contribution towards a better life. Before his Aliyah to Palestine, he published 43 articles on intestinal bacteria, diphtheria, streptococci, leptospira and yellow fever. Some of them, such as those relating to environmental bacterial and oral flora, were pioneering works.

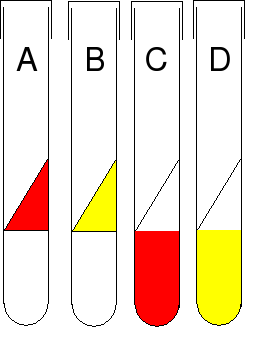
Kligler's Iron Agar (KIA) is primarily used to differentiate members of Enterobacteriaceae and to distinguish them from other Gram-negative bacilli such as Pseudomonas or Alcaligenes where the interpretation is done by color and position in the tube with yellow to red distinguishing the acid production associated with glucose.

Kligler arrived in Palestine in 1921. After working for a year as the director of the Hadassah Bacteriological Laboratory in Jerusalem, Kligler moved to Haifa and began his research into malaria, then the most destructive disease in Palestine. His anti-malaria work is considered both nationally and internationally as his most important scientific work that resulted in a malaria-free Israel several years after his death.

From 1922 to 1925, Kligler published epidemiological studies on various infectious disease, working with the renowned ophthalmologist Avraham Albert Ticho on Trachoma. He researched Helminthic incidence in Jerusalem, Oriental Sore (leishmaniasis) and the characterization of Trypanosoma and Leishmania parasites grown on media.

In the spheres of microbiology, epidemiology and public health, he emphasized applied research, striving for continued improvement of the quality of life in the country. During his 24 years in Eretz Israel, Kligler published many articles on Microbiology (62 works), Parasitology (84) Virology (41) and Nutrition (6). Kligler wrote for newspapers in Mandatory Palestine and abroad, lectured to audiences worldwide and regularly appeared on radio programs of Kol Yerushalayim (The Voice of Jerusalem), the new radio station in Palestine in the late 1930s.

Many researchers who worked with Kligler in his department became distinguished professors of science in institutions in the country and abroad. Students and colleagues included: Prof. Gideon Mer (1894–1961) – a malariologist; Prof. Aryeh Leo Olitzky (1898–1983) - a bacteriologist at the Hebrew University-Hadassah Medical School; Prof. Abraham Komarov (1907–1960) who became Director of the Government Veterinary Institute, Haifa and produced one of the most successful Foot-and-mouth disease vaccines; Prof. Meir Yoeli (1912–1975) – a biologist who studied rodent malaria at the New York University Medical School, and also wrote extensively on history of science including articles on malaria; Prof. Manfred Aschner (1901–1989) – a microbiologist and entomologist and was awarded the Israel Prize in 1956; Prof. Yechiel Karl Guggenheim (1906–2002) – a nutritionist and Prof. Hans Bernkopf (1910–1966) – a virologist.

In 1922 Kligler taught the first course in hygiene at Hadassah Hospital in Jerusalem. The course was in Hebrew. Four of the five students in this first course joined him at the Anti-Malaria Research Institute that opened in September 1922 in Haifa, and worked as anti-malaria inspectors.

In the early 1930s, Hebrew University began to offer courses in the natural sciences. During Kligler's tenure, more than forty students completed their studies in a master's degree and doctorate in natural sciences in the Department of Microbiology. Among his Ph.D. students were Benjamin Elazari Volcani (1915–1999) who was among the first to be awarded a Ph.D. from the Hebrew University and became a pioneer in the study of silicon compounds; Nathan Grossowicz (1914–2904) who became a professor in the Department of Microbiology of the university and worked on Legionnaires' disease; Deborah Kaplan – an immunologist at The Chicago Medical School; Zvi Saliternik (1897–1993) who was awarded the Israel Prize in 1962 for his contribution to the control of malaria in the country; Prof. Shlomo Hestrin (1914–1962) who won the Israel Prize for Exact Science in 1957; Hannah Farkas – a bacteriologist who was married to Ladislaus Farkas; Emanuel Eylan (Oleinik) – a bacteriologist and David Nachtigal – a cellular immunologist at the Weizmann Institute, Rehovot.

Among his graduate students were Natan Goldblum (1920–2001), a virologist who worked on polio research and other viral pathogenesis and was awarded the Israel Prize in 1988, and Aviva Zuckerman – a malaria researcher.

Nathan Grossowicz described Kligler as

"original and interesting. He did not put a lot of importance in formal lectures and his teaching method was largely to require his students to read appropriate material including research articles followed by extensive class critical discussions and analysis with emphasis on experiment. Such that he stressed a hands on approach and instructed students to design their own experimental methods."

The knowledge and experience he acquired before coming to Palestine, his organizational abilities, initiative and obvious talents in planning and carrying out projects turned Kligler into a respected and valued director and a member of many committees. He insisted on personally overseeing every facet of his work, and everything had to be carried out according to his directions and specifications. In the Malaria Research Unit it was he who planned all the operational projects down to the smallest detail, and allocated the funding that was given to him. His administrative work was accompanied by research and experiments, the outcome of which significantly contributed to the eradication of the disease. His managerial style and abrupt communication with people whose knowledge he did not appreciate did result in strong criticism, which he disregarded. Throughout his career at the Hebrew University, the department he built became the most productive and the largest in the Life Sciences Institute. He excelled in obtaining funding for research. His fame and his connections helped him raise great sums of money, mainly from the US, which enabled him to recruit researchers and workers, to purchase the equipment for the laboratories and to finance research projects that kept piling up.

== Anti-malaria campaign ==
Kligler was a key contributor to the eradication of malaria in British Mandate Palestine. Malaria was a major factor in morbidity and death in the region, and had important repercussions for Jewish settlement. Kligler gathered information about the health issues in the country and acquired experience in the field by joining a delegation for the Study of Yellow Fever in South America. Kligler prepared a malaria eradication program that was sent to several organizations and public figures, including Justice Louis D Brandeis, who visited the country in 1919 and was shocked by the morbidity from malaria. After failing to convince Chaim Weizmann and the Zionist executives of the need to invest in the eradication of malaria, Brandeis privately financed $10,000 for an experimental project through Hadassah, which Kligler directed. In the Galilee and around Lake Kinnereth (Sea of Galilee), malaria had decimated the Jewish settlements, with the incidence rate running at more than 95 percent of the workers in 1919. Kligler's report of 1921 showed that the incidence rate had been cut drastically, with many settlements reporting no cases at all.

Brandeis was impressed by the program, writing:

"I have Kligler's Anti-Malaria Report for May–June 1921 and think the results most satisfactory. Fundamental work - ably, conscientiously and economically done - by one who seems to be thinking only of his job and its relation to the great work at hand."

Hadassah and the Joint Distribution Committee continued to finance the anti-malaria work until 1926, with Kligler heading the project. In 1922, Kligler founded and managed the Malaria Research Institute in Haifa, established by the Joint Distribution Committee Hadassah with Brandeis's financial assistance, and worked with the Department of Health under Mandatory Palestine. Studies at the Institute examined the feasibility of plans prepared by Kligler and evaluated methods appropriate for each region of the country. The unit collected data regarding the prevalence of the disease, types and breeding places of the mosquitoes and in parallel focused on education of the public in regard to controlling the disease.

Kligler showed the ineffectiveness of previous methods used for the control of malaria in the country, namely, planting of Eucalyptus trees to dry the marshes, and the provision of Quinine prophylaxis for preventing infection. Kligler focused his studies on the larval stage of the mosquito life-cycle. He studied the prevalence of various Anopheles species, their biology and nesting grounds, tested different methods of eradication and selected the appropriate measures, taking into account their efficiency and cost.

His work demonstrated that drainage of the swamps alone would have had little effect on the malaria, because the mosquitoes breed in little pools of water which even the most elaborate system of drainage would not have reached. It was subsequently pointed out that at least half of the malaria could be ascribed simply to human carelessness and neglect. This resulted in such an improvement to the quality of the land with respect to malaria and marshes that agriculture could be introduced safely.

One of the new method he initiated was the introduction of Gambusia fish to water sources in the country in 1923. The use of larvivorous fish to diminish mosquito populations was already well known at that time, e.g., the importance lies in the protocols used to define which of the known species of Gambusia was best suited to the local conditions. The fish turned out to be an effective biological means against mosquito's larvae. The result was the almost total eradication of malaria in the upper Jordan Valley, i.e. the Huleh area, north of the Sea of Galilee, (Note: see Gachelin's reference to Kligler 1925-26 work on the epidemiology of malaria in Palestine) by using where appropriate combinations of anti-larval fish and drainage techniques.

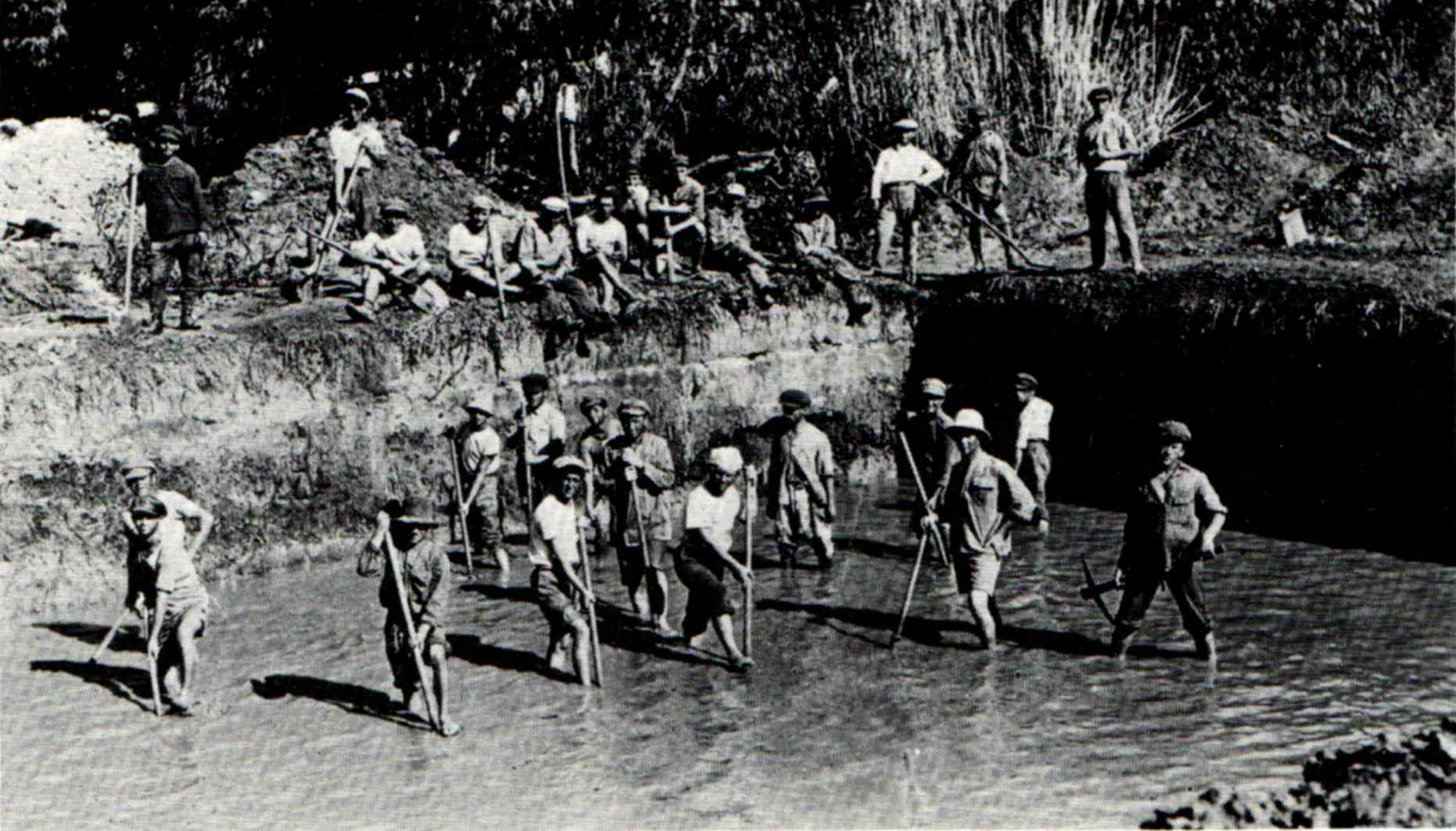
Kabara marshes drainage works in 1925

The achievements of Kligler and his staff in combating malaria were brought to the attention of the Health Organization, an agency of the League of Nations, the predecessor of the World Health Organization, which in May 1925 sent a delegation to Mandatory Palestine. The delegation gave international recognition to the importance of anti-malarial activity conducted in the country. Kligler lectured on the war against malaria in Mandatory Palestine at the first international malaria conference held in Rome in October 1925; in the lecture he described the main effort is directed towards destruction of breeding places of mosquitoes.

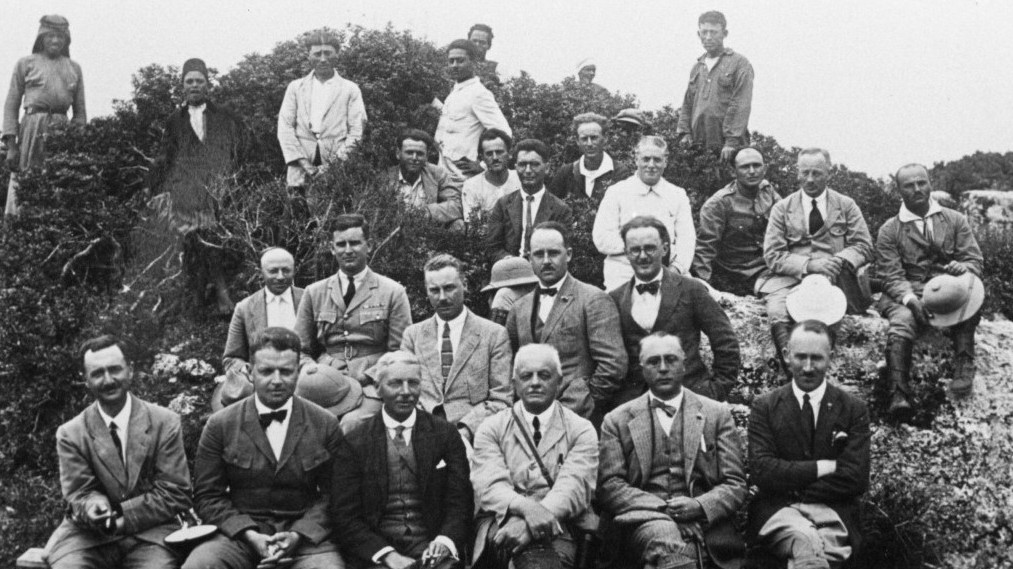
The League of Nations malaria commission in Palestine, 1925. Israel Kligler is the bald man in the second row, far left

In 1927 he founded the "Malaria Research Station" of the Hebrew University in Rosh Pina, where pioneering field work was carried out relating to the eradication of malaria. Two years later he appointed Dr. Gideon Mer as the station manager, and together they published a series of articles on malaria.

A contemporary cartoon describes Kligler as the great malaria eradicator and courageous researcher.

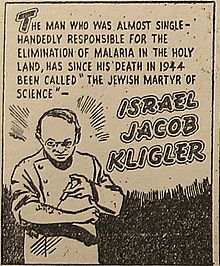
Published in the journal of the American Jewish 'The Southern Jewish Weekly, 31 October 1947, describing the contribution and activities of Kligler by injecting himself with vaccine developed at the request of the Polish government. The caption tells the contribution of malaria eradication in Israel

In 1922, the 12th Zionist Congress created the Va'ad ha-Briut (Health Council) as part of the Va'ad Leumi, the Jewish National Council and the executive authority of the Jews in Palestine. In 1926 Kligler was asked by the Va'ad ha-Briut to approve any new settlement from the point of view of malaria risk. He crisscrossed the length and breadth of Palestine many times checking the suitability of new land for settlement. The original Kibbutz Amir, the last of the tower and stockade settlements, was first built on the edge of the Hula swamp, in opposition to Kligler's advice, and as such all members of the kibbutz had malaria. After three years, in 1942 it was moved to its present location.

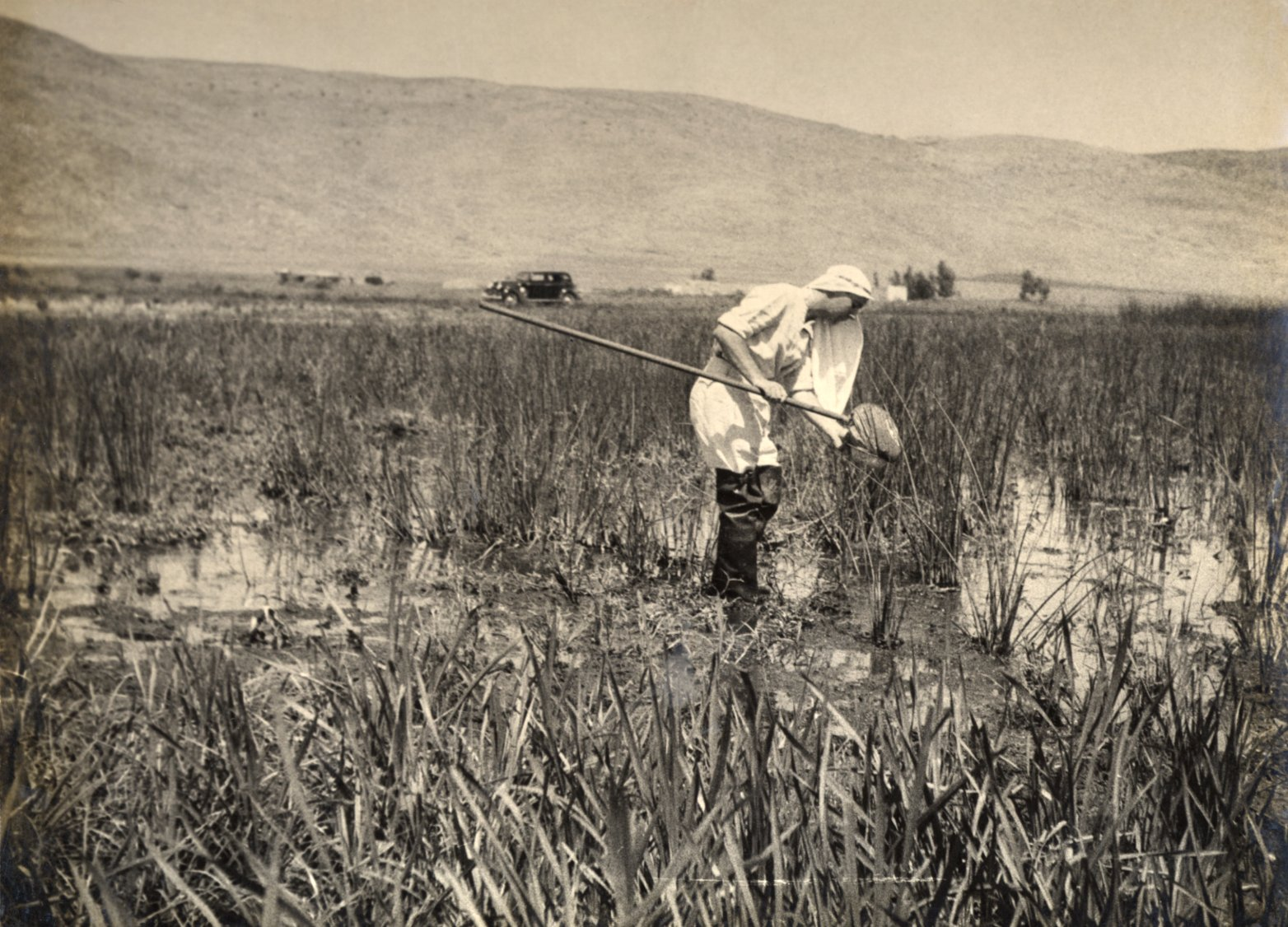
Life in Hula 1938. A worker from the Anti Malaria Station in the swamp lands around Hula Lake. Photographed by Zalman Gichon.

Professor Nocht, President of the League of Nations Commission, while in Palestine, concluded after Dr Kligler's report the following:

"... It was not the custom of the commission to make comparisons but we would on this occasion, say that the interest Palestine had provided was unsurpassed by that of any of their other visits, ... the Commission would greatly profit by its visit to Palestine, and the world would surely benefit by what they have seen there, through the medium of the League of Nations".

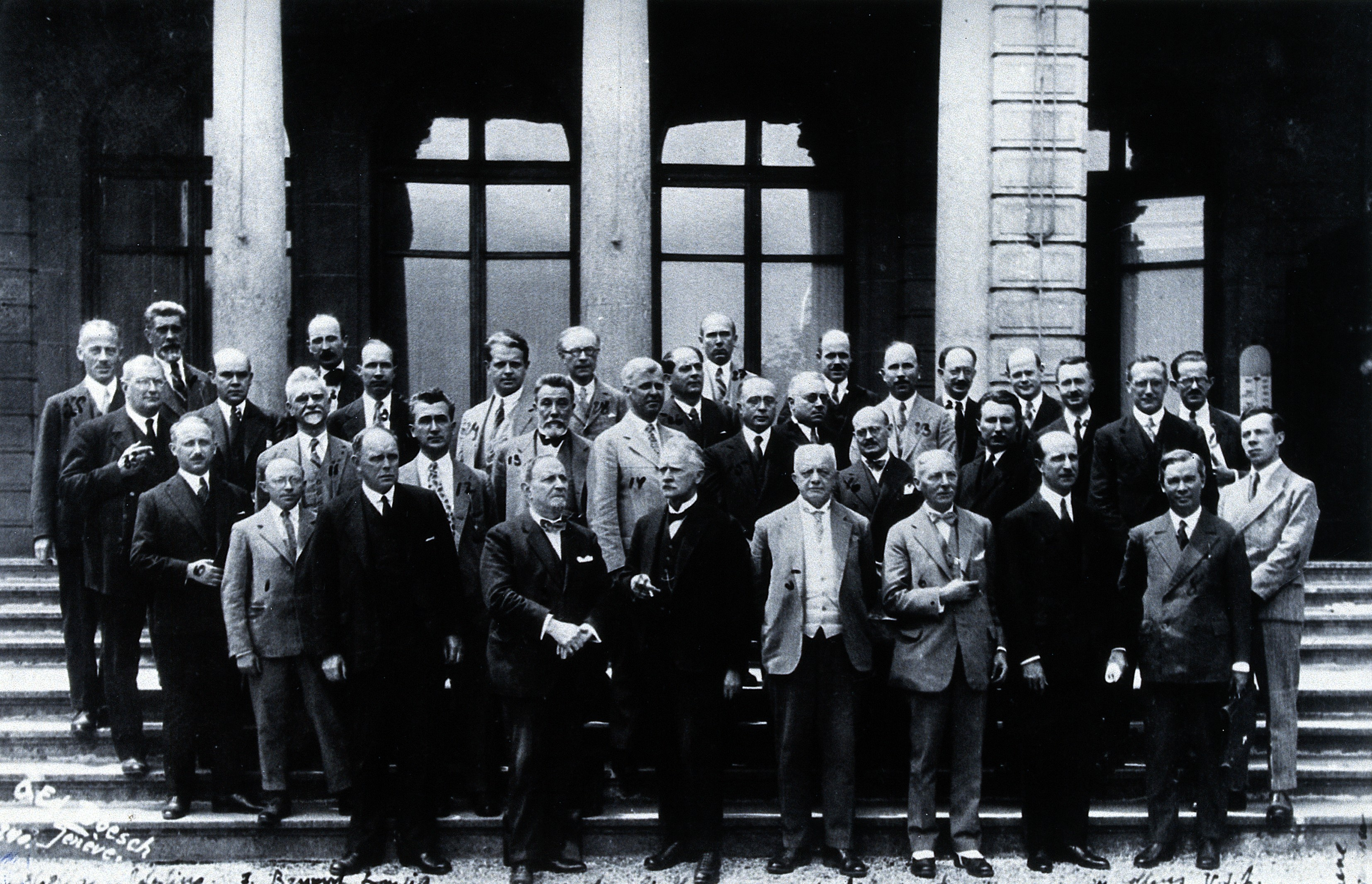
Malaria Commission of the League of Nations, Geneva (1928). Kligler is on the far left of the front row. Photograph by Poesch photographic agency.

Dr Kligler's efforts to eliminate malaria in Palestine came notwithstanding the pessimism of "... the experts of 1918 ... (who prophesied) that the future of this country (Palestine) might be considered to be almost hopeless from the malarial standpoint..."

== Public health ==
Kligler also worked extensively in matters connected with public health. He joined the Health Advisory Board established in 1922 by the 12th Zionist Congress, and in 1933 he was elected to replace Henrietta Szold as chairman of the Zionist Organization health committee. He collaborated with Avraham Katznelson, who ran the Department of Health, and together they coordinated the exchanges between various medical institutions, including Hadassah health care, Clalit Health Services and other organizations.

Kligler was an active member in associations that promoted physical activity, such as the Association for Playgrounds in Israel and the Association for Public Swimming Pools established in the 1930s. At the annual meeting of physical education teachers, he spoke about the importance of physical exercise.

Kligler was among the founders of the Anti-Tuberculosis League, a national body established in 1925 after several failed attempts, and served as its first chairman. He was also a member of the Advisory Committee of the Palestinian Society for the Deaf, established in the mid-1930s.

Kligler organized the first national conference of microbiologists in Mandatory Palestine, held in Jerusalem in 1936, and was elected president of Palestinian Microbiology Association. He was chairman of the meetings held between the years 1936–1942.

From its establishment in 1929, Kligler ran the Nathan and Lina Straus Health Center in Jerusalem (now part of Hadassah Medical Center), which gained a strong reputation for its public health programs during the ten years under his guidance.

Kligler hosted and served as a guide for many distinguished international visitors, among them Commander Bernard Montgomery, Rabbi Stephen Wise and the American ambassador in Russia, William Christian Bullitt.

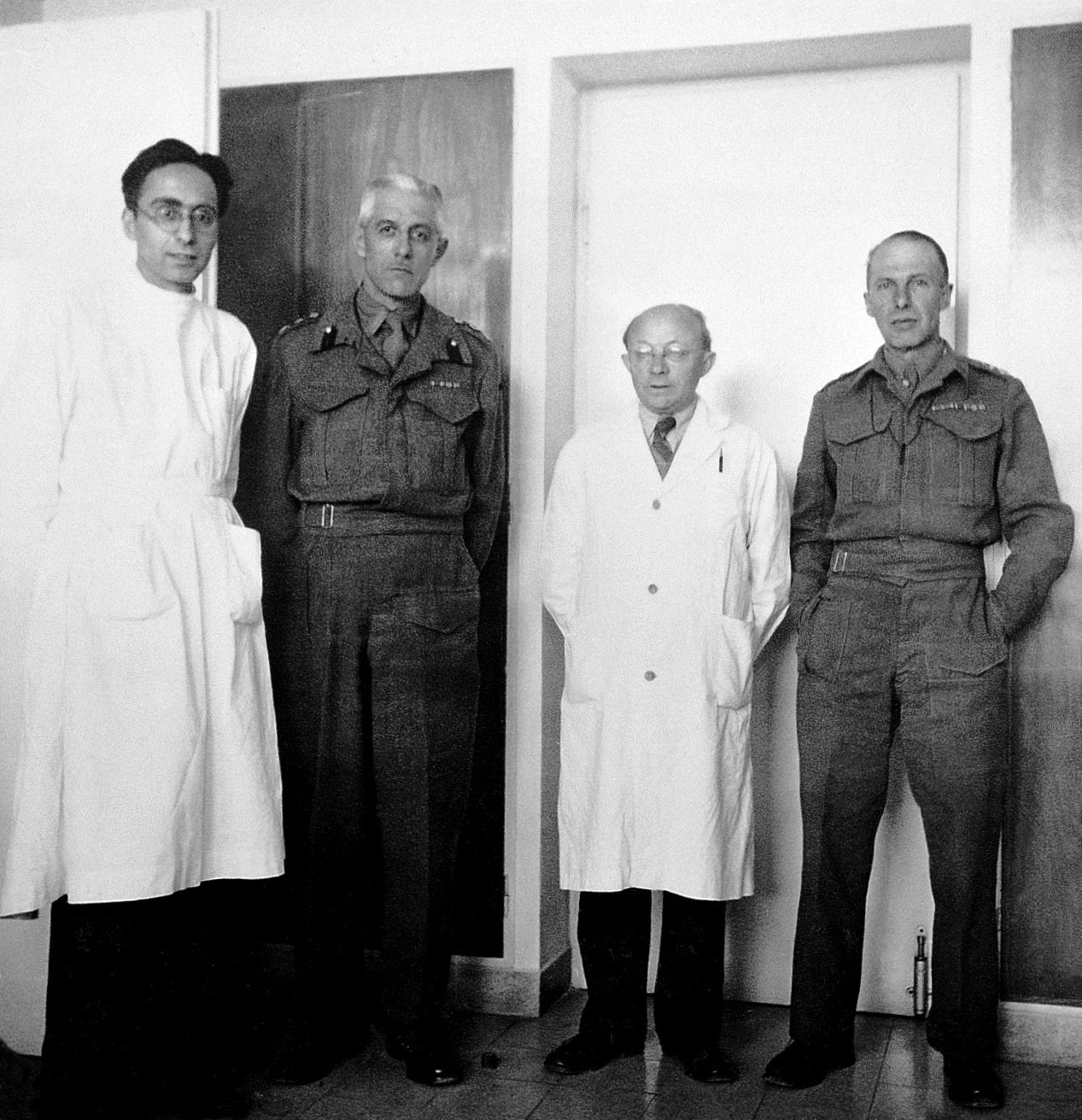
G.W.M Findlay (Wellcome Bureau of Scientific Research, 1928–46), Kligler and Little, in Kligler's office, Hebrew University, Jerusalem

He regularly attended meetings of the General Agricultural Council of Israel, and chaired the Nutrition Committee as a representative of the Hebrew University and later the Jewish Agency. He was active in programs to promote the local olive oil industry and treat livestock diseases.

In 1930, he organized the first survey of nutrition in the country. The survey findings led to the founding of a Nutrition Committee headed by Kligler. Kligler enthusiastically supported a plan of Dr. Katznelson of the Va'ad Leumi to provide a daily glass of milk to schoolchildren, which would not only improve nutrition but would also help dairy farmers. The campaign began in May 1938 in Jerusalem and shortly after was extended to other cities.

When the public health organisation suffered from financial problems in 1937, Kligler secured financial aid. As World War II approached, he was appointed to a committee to investigate community preparedness and handle emergencies when the war broke out. At the beginning of 1941 he was asked by the American-Jewish Joint Distribution Committee (JDC) to organize medical aid for Jewish refugees from Europe who arrived in the Dominican Republic at Sosua. Sosua was the site of a Jewish Refugee settlement created by and large by the JDC as the Dominican Republic Settlement Association (DORSA). In December 1942 Jacob Kligler and his wife Helen spent three weeks on a medical inspection of Sosua. They jointly made reports on their recommendations on malaria control and primary medical care. (Note: The Kligler's letters and reports are held in the American Jewish Joint Distribution Committee (JDC) Archives in the collection "Records of the Dominican Republic Settlement Association (DORSA), 1939-1977". Their report "Health Survey in Sosua, Dec 1942 by I.J.Kligler & Helen Kligler" is not online however their informal report is available as JDC Item ID 585147 (DORSA), Folder 'Minute Books, December 1942 - May 1943'.)

In 1942, the Polish government-in-exile in London had asked Kligler to prepare a typhus vaccine to save thousands of refugees in Eastern Europe. In the words of the Polish consul,

"Professor Kligler did not hesitate to help them. Together with a number of his devoted assistants, he began this work with enthusiasm. Knowing well the danger, he and his assistants tried the vaccine on themselves. They all contracted the disease, and it needed the competence of his eminent colleagues to save Professor Kligler's life. The President of Poland greatly appreciated Professors Kligler's humanitarian, unselfish work, and his sacrifice for the sake of suffering Polish citizens, and in order to acknowledge this, confers upon Professor Israel Kligler the Golden Cross of Merit." (Note: Part of the speech of the Polish Consul in Jerusalem, Mr Aleksy Wdziekonski, at the award ceremony July 26, 1943. Kligler's assistants suffered only a minor form of the disease. Kligler apparently contracted a serious viral infection that caused his hospitalization for 60 days.)

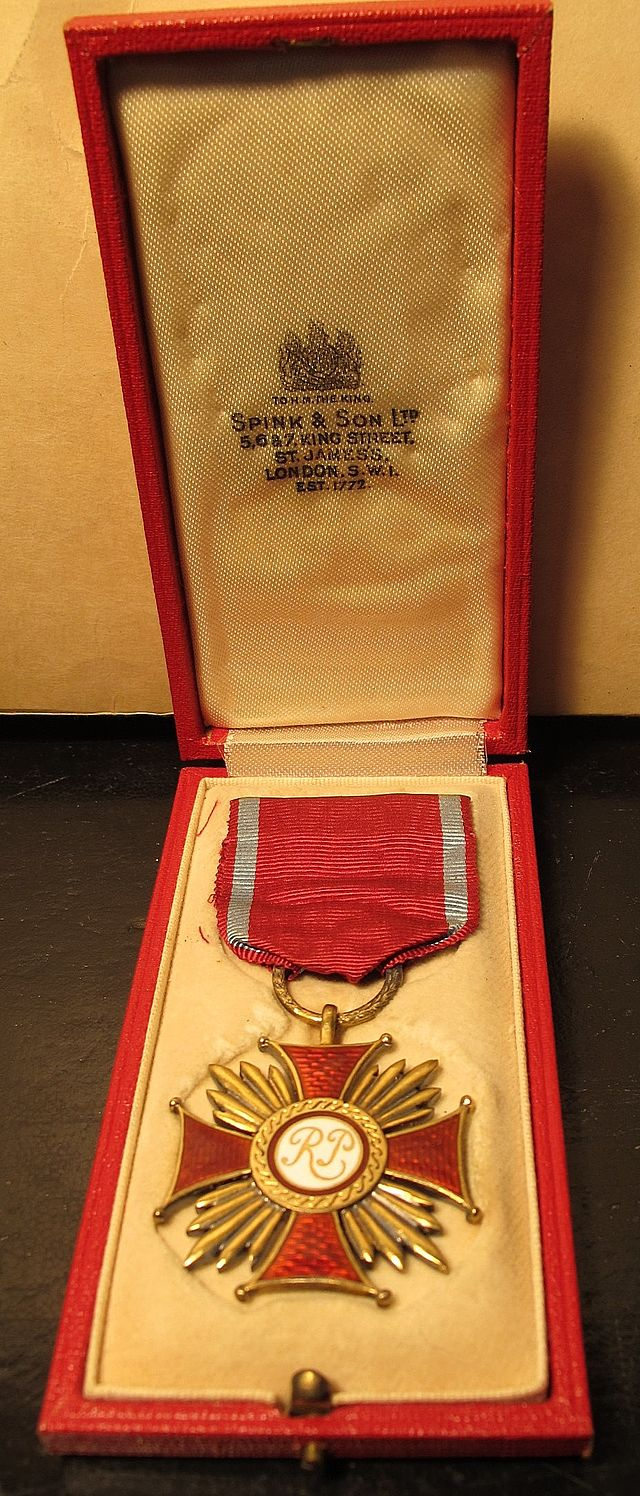
"Cross of Merit" - A medal awarded to Kligler by the Polish government in 1943 via the Polish consul in Jerusalem, for his contribution to the development of a vaccine for Polish refugees and for displaying courage by trying the vaccine on himself and his assistants.

Three years later he was sent by the Joint Distribution Committee to organize medical aid for the arrival of 1,600 Yemeni-Jewish refugees in Aden.

He died a few months after his return to Mandatory Palestine.

== Political views ==
Kligler's political views lay with the Brit Shalom, an organization espousing a binational solution for promoting the co-existence of Jews and Arabs in the State of Israel, views shared by his close friends Judah Magnes and Henrietta Szold.

== Commemoration ==
Although there were many proposals to commemorate Kligler after his death, such as building a clinic in his name, publishing a book in his memory and the establishment of a fund for students in his name - due to the tumultuous events experienced by the community in the 1940s, only a few projects were carried out and they did not last long.

Kligler's grave, along with others including that of Henrietta Szold, were desecrated after the 1947–1949 Palestine war (1948), when the cemetery on the Mount of Olives was under Jordanian jurisdiction and a road was paved over it. After the Six-Day War (1967) the area fell under Israeli jurisdiction, the road was removed and a mass grave was created. Among the names listed on the memorial stone is the name of Israel Jacob Kligler.

Some blame the lack of commemoration on issues between Kligler and other members of the local academia. As of 2012, The Times of Israel newspaper concluded that only "two Kligler loyalists are waging a lonely battle to restore him to what they see as his rightful place in the history of Israel and of the fight against malaria." These are named as the retired Israeli scientist Zalman Greenberg, former director of the Health Ministry's Public Health Laboratory in Jerusalem, and the retired London lawyer Anton Alexander. The former is an experienced researcher and author on the topic of medical history in Mandate Palestine and Israel, while the latter has been very active outside Israel and has set up a website highlighting Kligler's achievements. Greenberg goes as far as to doubt that there would have been a State of Israel without Kligler's contribution at eradicating malaria.

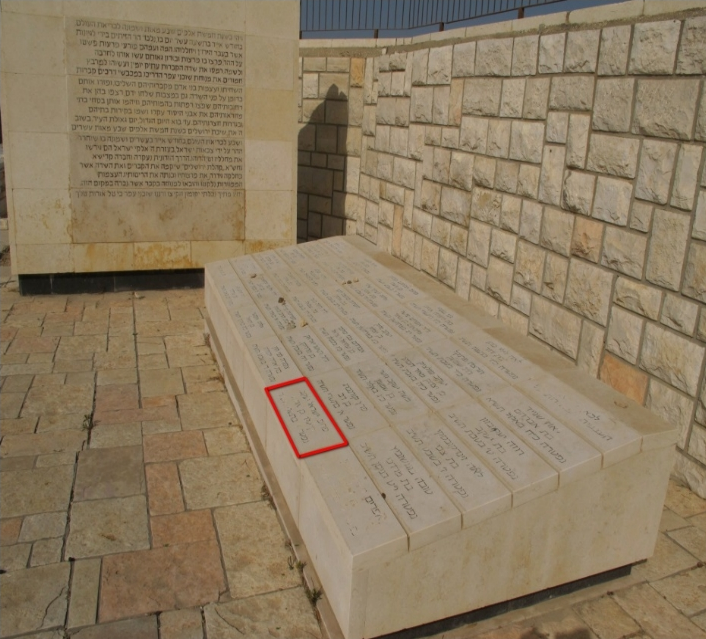
The Mount of Olives mass grave was created in 1972, after the Six-Day War (1967), and contains the remnants of bones and tombstones found strewn all over the mountain after the desecration of the cemetery in the period 1948 until 1967. Jacob Kligler's name is highlighted.

== See also ==
- Malaria in Mandatory Palestine
