= Malaria in Mandatory Palestine =

History of the disease in British-ruled Palestine

Malaria was a major issue in Mandatory Palestine, having been attested as endemic to the region since the biblical period. In the early 20th century, multiple malaria epidemics resulted in widespread deaths. The disease severely affected large areas of Palestine, including much of the land that was purchased by the Jewish settlement. Swampy and low-lying areas, in particular, allowed mosquitoes to thrive and made sustained human habitation impossible. However, a large-scale effort was undertaken by Zionist immigrants to drain the swamps, clear dense vegetation, and implement public health measures to defend against and suppress the mosquito population, transforming the previously uninhabitable areas into viable land for agriculture and settlement and eventually leading to the complete eradication of malaria in the region by the 1960s.

Before 1918, malaria was common throughout Mandatory Palestine, but by 1926, it had been nearly eliminated from the Upper Galilee and the Jezreel Valley. The anti-malaria campaign helped to increase the Jewish and Arab populations of the region.

== Background ==
As large areas had been malaria-infested and uninhabitable for centuries, the efforts of Zionist immigrants to clear malaria made it possible for them to expand and thrive. By draining swamps and implementing public health measures, they transformed previously unusable land into viable areas for agriculture and settlement, allowing for the growth and development of these communities. Jews settled in the less inhabited coasts and valleys, which had high rates of malaria and were more easily bought.

== Kligler's anti-malaria campaign ==
Israel Jacob Kligler was a microbiologist, a Zionist, and a key contributor to the eradication of malaria in Israel. Malaria was a major factor in morbidity and death in the country, and had important repercussions for Jewish settlement. Before the Aliyah, Kligler gathered information about the health issues in the country and acquired experience in the field by joining a delegation for the Study of Yellow Fever in South America. Kligler prepared a malaria eradication program that was sent to several organizations and public figures, including Justice Louis Brandeis, who visited the country in 1919 and was shocked by the morbidity of malaria. After failing to convince Chaim Weizmann and the Zionist executives of the need to invest in the eradication of malaria, Brandeis privately financed $10,000 for an experimental malaria elimination project. This project was directed by Kliger and run through Hadassah Medical Centre. In the Galilee and around Lake Kinnereth (Sea of Galilee), malaria had decimated the Jewish settlements, with the incidence rate "at better than 95 percent of the workers in 1919."

Kligler showed the ineffectiveness of previous methods used for the control of malaria in the country, namely, planting of Eucalyptus trees to dry the marshes, and the provision of Quinine prophylaxis for preventing infection. Kligler focused his studies on the larval stage of the mosquito life-cycle. He studied the prevalence of various Anopheles species, their biology and nesting grounds, tested different methods of eradication and selected the appropriate measures, taking into account their efficiency and cost.

His work demonstrated that drainage of the swamps alone would have had little effect on the malaria, because the mosquitoes breed in small pools of water, which even the most elaborate system of drainage would not have reached. It was subsequently pointed out that at least half of the malaria could be ascribed simply to human carelessness and neglect. This resulted in such an improvement to the quality of the land with respect to malaria and marshes that agriculture could be introduced safely.

One of the new methods he initiated was the introduction of Gambusia fish to water sources in the country in 1923. The use of larvivorous fish to diminish mosquito populations was already well known at that time, e.g., the importance lies in the protocols used to define which of the known species of Gambusia was best suited to the local conditions. The fish effectively reduced the number of mosquito larva surviving into adulthood. The result, combined with drainage techniques, was the almost total eradication of malaria in the upper Jordan Valley, i.e. the Huleh area, north of the Sea of Galilee. (Note: see Gachelin's reference to Kligler 1925-26 work on the epidemiology of malaria in Palestine)

In 1925, Kligler stated in a preliminary report that between 1922 and 1925, new malaria incidences had declined tenfold. In reality, the incidence rate had dropped to zero in most places in the upper Galilee and Jezreel Valley. Between 1922 and 1926, there was almost complete elimination of Anopheles and malaria in those areas. The achievements of Kligler and his staff in combating malaria were brought to the attention of the Health Organization, an agency of the League of Nations, the predecessor of the World Health Organization, which in May 1925 sent a delegation to Mandatory Palestine. (Figure 4) The delegation gave international recognition to the importance of anti-malarial activity conducted in the country. Kligler lectured on the war against malaria in Mandatory Palestine at the first international malaria conference held in Rome in October 1925; in the lecture he described the main effort is directed towards destruction of breeding places of mosquitoes. In 1927, he founded the "Malaria Research Station" of the Hebrew University in Rosh Pina, where pioneering fieldwork was carried out relating to the eradication of malaria. Two years later, he appointed Dr. Gideon Mer as the station manager and together they published a series of articles on malaria.

In a 1932 report, Kligler stated the disease was largely controlled in Jewish and neighboring Arab villages. In non-Jewish regions, malaria was still common. Kligler wrote that nevertheless, “tremendous progress has been made in the last ten years toward the control and, in many places, the elimination of this scourge.” In a 1936 Memorandum to the United Nations Special Committee, the British Administration reported census numbers and stated that the anti-malaria campaign was a factor in helping to increase the Arab population in Palestine.
