= Zvi Sliternik =

Israeli entomologist

Zvi Saliternik צבי סליטרניק
- Born: 16 May 1897; Ploskirów, Russian Empire
- Died: 17 October 1993 (aged 96); Israel
- Citizenship: Israeli
- Awards: Israel Prize (1962)

Zvi Saliternik (Hebrew: צבי סליטרניק; 16 May 1897 – 17 October 1993) was an Israeli entomologist.

== Biography ==
Sliternik was born in 1897 in Ploskirów, in the Podolia region of Russian Empire (now known as Khmelnytskyi, in Ukraine). He began studying medicine in Russia, but did not complete his studies before emigrating in 1919 to Mandate Palestine. There he met Shoshanah Lissauer, a Jewish tourist volunteer from Berlin, Germany, whom he married in 1929.

He returned to his studies, studying biology at the Hebrew University of Jerusalem. In 1946, he received a doctorate.

Sliternik began his entomology work in 1921, as a member of a small unit headed by Dr. Israel Kligler, to develop inexpensive and efficient methods of fighting malaria, which ultimately resulted in the total eradication of malaria in 1962.

He was appointed regional supervisor for the elimination of malaria in the Jezreel Valley and supervised the draining of the marshes in the vicinity of Hadera, as well as additional areas throughout the country. Sliternik served as director of entomological service in the IDF in 1948 and was subsequently director of the entomological department in the Israel Ministry of Health from 1949 to 1962.

== Awards ==
- In 1962, Sliternik was awarded the Israel Prize, in medicine, for his work on the eradication of malaria in Israel.

== See also ==
- List of Israel Prize recipients
