= Biltmore Conference =

1942 Zionist conference

The Biltmore Conference, also known by its resolution as the Biltmore Program, was a fundamental departure from traditional Zionist policy, prompted by the White Paper of 1939 and the ongoing Holocaust, that sought "that Palestine be established as a Jewish Commonwealth." The meeting was held in New York City, at the prestigious Biltmore Hotel, from May 6 to May 11, 1942, with 600 delegates and Zionist leaders from 18 countries attending.

This marked the first time that Zionist leaders called for the establishment of a Jewish state. The program has been described by a number of historians as "a virtual coup d’état" within Zionism since the movement's more moderate leaders were replaced by leaders with more aggressive goals.

== History ==
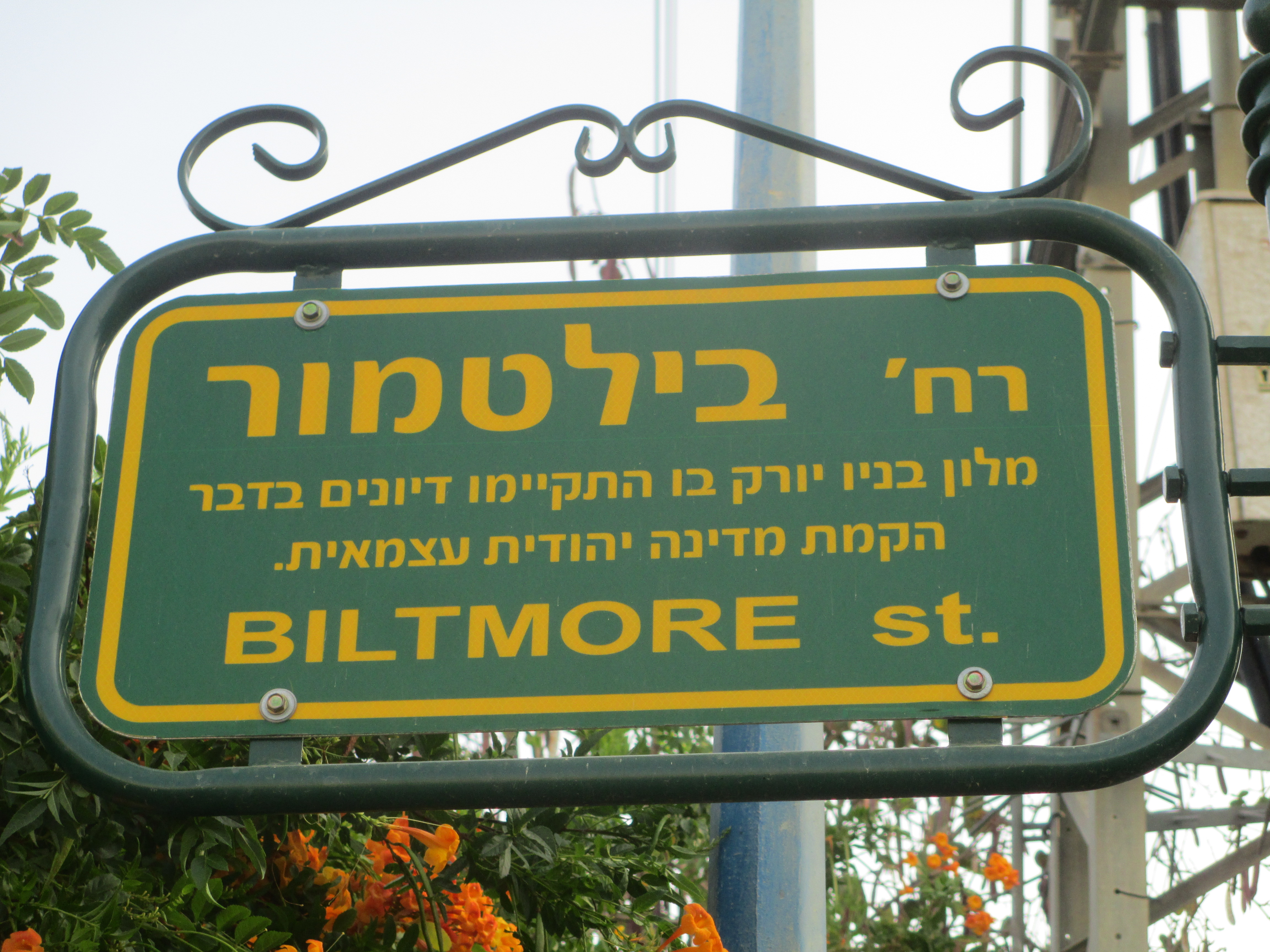
Biltmore Street, Petah Tikva, commemorating the Biltmore Conference

Prior to this Extraordinary Zionist Conference at the Biltmore, official Zionism had steadfastly refused to formulate the ultimate aim of the movement but preferred to concentrate on the practical task of building the Jewish National Home. The Biltmore Program became the official Zionist stand on the ultimate aim of the movement. According to Ben-Gurion, the "first and essential" stage of the program was the immigration of two million additional Jews to Palestine. In 1944, a One Million Plan would become the official policy of the Zionist leadership. There was no reference to the Arab population prevailing in Mandatory Palestine, which, according to Anita Shapira, marked a transition to the view that conflict was inevitable between the Arabs and Jews and could only be resolved by the sword.

The major shift at Biltmore was prompted by intense common opposition to the British White Paper of 1939, which interpreted the terms of the Mandate in a way that would freeze "the Jewish community to a permanent minority status", and the negative situation during the war. The shift was prompted also by the realization that America would play a larger part in fulfillment of Zionist designs after the war.

Official Zionism’s firm unequivocal stand did not please everyone, however. The pro-British Chaim Weizmann had bristled at it. Also, binationalists such as Henrietta Szold and Judah L. Magnes rejected the stand and broke off to establish their own party, Ichud ("Unification"), which advocated an Arab–Jewish federation. Opposition to the Biltmore Program also led to the founding of the anti-Zionist American Council for Judaism.

Various Zionist organizations were represented in the American Emergency Committee of Zionist Affairs, which called an "Extraordinary Zionist Conference" as a substitute for the full (22nd) Zionist Congress, which had been cancelled because of World War II. Attendees included Chaim Weizmann, as President of the Zionist Organization; David Ben-Gurion, as Chairman of the Jewish Agency Executive; and Nahum Goldmann, as a member of the Executive of the Zionist Organization of America. The four main organisations of American Jewry represented were the Zionist Organization of America, Hadassah, Mizrahi, and Poale Zion. Among the American organizers was Reform Rabbi Abba Hillel Silver.

== Declaration ==
The joint statement issued at the end of the session was known as the Biltmore Program. It asked for unrestricted Jewish immigration to Palestine. Here is the full text of the program:

1. American Zionists assembled in this Extraordinary Conference reaffirm their unequivocal devotion to the cause of democratic freedom and international justice to which the people of the United States, allied with the other United Nations, have dedicated themselves, and give expression to their faith in the ultimate victory of humanity and justice over lawlessness and brute force.
2. This Conference offers a message of hope and encouragement to their fellow Jews in the Ghettos and concentration camps of Hitler-dominated Europe and prays that their hour of liberation may not be far distant.
3. The Conference sends its warmest greetings to the Jewish Agency Executive in Jerusalem, to the Va`ad Leumi, and to the whole Yishuv in Palestine, and expresses its profound admiration for their steadfastness and achievements in the face of peril and great difficulties ...
4. In our generation, and in particular in the course of the past twenty years, the Jewish people have awakened and transformed their ancient homeland; from 50,000 at the end of the last war their numbers have increased to more than 500,000. They have made the waste places to bear fruit and the desert to blossom. Their pioneering achievements in agriculture and in industry, embodying new patterns of cooperative endeavour, have written a notable page in the history of colonization.
5. In the new values thus created, their Arab neighbours in Palestine have shared. The Jewish people in its own work of national redemption welcomes the economic, agricultural and national development of the Arab peoples and states. The Conference reaffirms the stand previously adopted at Congresses of the World Zionist Organization, expressing the readiness and the desire of the Jewish people for full cooperation with their Arab neighbours.
6. The Conference calls for the fulfillment of the original purpose of the Balfour Declaration and the Mandate which recognizing the historical connection of the Jewish people with Palestine' was to afford them the opportunity, as stated by President Wilson, to found there a Jewish Commonwealth. The Conference affirms its unalterable rejection of the White Paper of May 1939 and denies its moral or legal validity. The White Paper seeks to limit, and in fact to nullify Jewish rights to immigration and settlement in Palestine, and, as stated by Mr. Winston Churchill in the House of Commons in May 1939, constitutes `a breach and repudiation of the Balfour Declaration'. The policy of the White Paper is cruel and indefensible in its denial of sanctuary to Jews fleeing from Nazi persecution; and at a time when Palestine has become a focal point in the war front of the United Nations, and Palestine Jewry must provide all available manpower for farm and factory and camp, it is in direct conflict with the interests of the allied war effort.
7. In the struggle against the forces of aggression and tyranny, of which Jews were the earliest victims, and which now menace the Jewish National Home, recognition must be given to the right of the Jews of Palestine to play their full part in the war effort and in the defence of their country, through a Jewish military force fighting under its own flag and under the high command of the United Nations.
8. The Conference declares that the new world order that will follow victory cannot be established on foundations of peace, justice and equality, unless the problem of Jewish homelessness is finally solved. The Conference urges that the gates of Palestine be opened; that the Jewish Agency be vested with control of immigration into Palestine and with the necessary authority for upbuilding the country, including the development of its unoccupied and uncultivated lands; and that Palestine be established as a Jewish Commonwealth integrated in the structure of the new democratic world.

Then and only then will the age old wrong to the Jewish people be righted.

After approval by the Zionist General Council in Palestine, the Biltmore Program was adopted as the platform of the World Zionist Organization.

== Jewish commonwealth ==
The significance of the program to a Jewish commonwealth was in stepping beyond the terms of the Balfour Declaration, which had been reaffirmed as British policy by Winston Churchill's White Paper of 1922, that there should be a "Jewish National Home" in Palestine. According to Ami Isseroff, the program was "a crucial step in the development of the Zionist movement, which increasingly saw itself as opposed to Britain rather than a collaborator of Britain, and it determined that henceforth Ben-Gurion and the Zionist Executive in Palestine, rather than Weizmann would lead the Zionist movement and determine policy toward the British."

The program spoke of the Jewish people for "the economic, agricultural and national development of the Arab peoples and states" but was implicitly a rejection of the proposal for a binational solution to the question of Arab-Jewish co-existence in Palestine. Hashomer Hatzair, a socialist-Zionist group, accordingly voted against the program.

The estimates for the destruction of European Jewry grew throughout 1942 and 1943. Chaim Weizmann urged a re-evaluation of the Biltmore program in June 1943. Weizmann’s earlier estimate of 25% destruction, which had been declared at the Biltmore Conference, now seemed wildly optimistic. Rabbi Meyer Berlin, the leader of the Mizrahi, a Zionist party, disagreed and argued that no one could know how many Jews would survive and how many would die.

== American Jewish Conference ==
At the American Jewish Conference of 29 August 1943, the program's adoption was challenged by Joseph Proskauer and Robert Goldman. They argued that the immediate problem was the rescue effort, not the establishment of a Jewish commonwealth. Goldman felt that the program was unduly weighted in favour of the establishment of a Jewish commonwealth and that focusing on that as a priority would hamper the efforts to rescue the European Jewry.

However, Abba Silver and Emanuel Neumann put forward that the establishment of a Jewish commonwealth should be the movement's primary aim.
