= Uriel Simon =

Israeli biblical scholar (1929–2026)

Uriel Simon (Hebrew: אוריאל סימון; 29 July 1929 – 30 September 2026) was an Israeli scholar of the Hebrew Bible and a religious Zionist peace activist. He taught at Bar-Ilan University from 1962 to 1998 and was known for his analysis of biblical narratives as relevant to the present day, his commentary on the Book of Jonah, and his studies of the medieval commentator Abraham ibn Ezra. He was a founding member of the religious peace movements Oz VeShalom and Netivot Shalom, and was a leader in the left-wing Meimad party. Simon drew on biblical texts to argue for peace with the Palestinians. He was awarded the Bialik Prize in Jewish thought in 2004.

== Life and career ==
=== Early life ===
Simon was born in Jerusalem on 29 July 1929, then part of Mandatory Palestine. His father, Akiva Ernst Simon, was a German-born educator and an early member of Brit Shalom, a movement that advocated a binational state with equal rights for Arabs and Jews; his mother, Tatiana (Toni) Simon, née Rappaport, ran the household.

Simon served in the Israel Defense Forces in 1948 and 1949. He then studied at the Hebrew University of Jerusalem, where he received his undergraduate and graduate degrees. As a student he won a prize named for Hayim Nahman Bialik that was awarded to outstanding students. In 1952 he served as a teacher to children of new immigrants at the Har Tuv ma'abara (transit camp), which later became the town of Beit Shemesh, and lived there in a tin shack. He completed a PhD in biblical studies at the Hebrew University in 1961. In 1960 he married Shulamit Munk, a chemist; they had two children.

=== Career ===
Simon joined the faculty of Bar-Ilan University in Ramat Gan as a lecturer in 1962. He became an associate professor in 1973 and was professor of Bible from 1982 to 1998. He took emeritus status in 1999. He was head of the department of biblical studies from 1964 to 1975. He founded the university's Institute for the History of Jewish Bible Research and was its director from 1974 to 1998. He was a popular lecturer, speaking in synagogues and auditoriums to both religious and secular audiences, and he continued to write into his nineties. In 2004 he was awarded the Bialik Prize for Jewish thought for the body of his work in biblical research.

=== Peace activism ===
Simon's activism grew out of his reading of the Bible. He was a founding member of Oz VeShalom and Netivot Shalom, two religious Zionist left-wing movements that later merged, and became a leader in the Meimad party. Simon called for compromise with the Palestinians in the West Bank and the Gaza Strip, and rejected the idea that the Bible required Israel to hold every part of those territories. Simon said that "we believe that Israel has to be strong to make peace, but that it should pursue peace as intensively as it pursues security." In Seek Peace and Pursue It (2002), he described peace as a biblical imperative. He argued that the Jewish right to live in the promised land depended on moral and just conduct.

=== Death ===
Simon died at his home in Jerusalem, on 30 September 2026, at the age of 97. He was survived by his wife; his son, Itamar Simon, a professor of microbiology and molecular genetics; his daughter, Michal Nagen, the founder of a pre-military academy for young women; 12 grandchildren; and 12 great-grandchildren.

== Biblical scholarship ==
Simon read the Hebrew Bible to be understood as relevant to contemporary conditions, and not necessarily as it had been interpreted in earlier rabbinic literature nor at the time of composition. Jonathan Jacobs, a fellow professor at Bar-Ilan, said that Simon read the texts focusing on "what message does it have for us today". He often presented biblical figures as morally complex rather than only heroic or villainous. For example, he read the Witch of Endor, usually considered evil, as a compassionate woman who fed Saul in his last hours even though he had outlawed her sorcery. Saul himself he presented as a once-charismatic leader reduced to a flawed and frightened man who deserved the reader's empathy.

Despite his goal of modern relevance, Simon still drew extensively from traditional Jewish interpretations and works. He studied and published literary analysis on various medieval biblical commentaries, especially that of the rationalist Abraham ibn Ezra.

His commentary on the Book of Jonah was one of his most widely discussed books. A common point of discussion is why precisely Jonah fled after God sent him to preach in Nineveh. Simon's answer was that Jonah fled because he knew God to be compassionate and expected God to forgive the Ninevites if they repented; by fleeing, perhaps God would have no choice but to destroy the Ninevites. Simon saw the core conflict of the book as one between Jonah's desire for justice against the possibility of divine mercy toward those who repent. For Simon, Jonah is a "genuinely pathetic figure in his hopeless struggle with his God" who is eventually restored to his dignity.

== Selected works ==
- Simon, Uriel (1961). Tefisat ha-zeman ṿeha-ḥalal ba-ḥashivah ha-Miḳraʼit [Time and Space in Biblical Thinking] (PhD thesis) (in Hebrew). Hebrew University of Jerusalem.
- Simon, Uriel (1982). Arbaʻ gishot le-Sefer Tehilim: me-R. Seʻadyah Gaʼon ʻad R. Avraham Ibn ʻEzra ארבע גישות לספר תהלים: מר׳ סעדיה גאון עד ר׳ אברהם אבן עזרא [Four Approaches to the Book of Psalms: From Saadiah Gaon to Abraham Ibn Ezra] (in Hebrew). Bar-Ilan University Press.
  - Simon, Uriel (1991). Four Approaches to the Book of Psalms: From Saadiah Gaon to Abraham Ibn Ezra. State University of New York Press.
- Simon, Uriel (1989). Shene perushe R. Avraham Ibn ʻEzra le-Tere-ʻaśar שני פירושי ר׳ אברהם אבן עזרא לתרי־עשר [Abraham Ibn Ezra's Two Commentaries on the Minor Prophets: An Annotated Critical Edition] (in Hebrew). Vol. 1: Hosea, Joel, Amos. Bar-Ilan University Press.
- Cogan, Mordechai; Simon, Uriel (1992). ʻOvadyah, Yonah עבדיה, יונה [Obadiah, Jonah]. Mikra le-Yiśraʼel (in Hebrew). Am Oved; Magnes Press.
  - Simon, Uriel (1994). Jona: Ein jüdischer Kommentar (in German). Verlag Katholisches Bibelwerk.
  - Simon, Uriel (1999). Jonah: The Traditional Hebrew Text with the New JPS Translation. The JPS Bible Commentary. Translated by Schramm, Lenn J. Jewish Publication Society.
- Simon, Uriel (1997). Ḳeriʼah sifrutit ba-Miḳra: Sipure neviʼim קריאה ספרותית במקרא: סיפורי נביאים [A Literary Reading of the Bible: Prophetic Stories] (in Hebrew). Bialik Institute; Bar-Ilan University Press.
  - Simon, Uriel (1997). Reading Prophetic Narratives. Indiana University Press.
- Simon, Uriel (1999). Maʻamad ha-Miḳra be-ḥevrah ha-Yiśreʼelit: Mi-midrash leʼumi li-feshaṭ ḳiyumi מעמד המקרא בחברה הישראלית: ממדרש לאומי לפשט קיומי [The Status of the Bible in Israeli Society: From National Midrash to Existential Peshat] (in Hebrew). Orna Hess.
- Simon, Uriel (2002). Baḳesh shalom ṿe-rodfehu: Sheʼelot ha-shaʻah be-or ha-Miḳra, ha-Miḳra be-or sheʼelot ha-shaʻah בקש שלום ורדפהו: שאלות השעה באור המקרא, המקרא באור שאלות השעה [Seek Peace & Pursue It: The Bible in the Light of Topical Issues] (in Hebrew). Yediot Aharonot; Sifre Ḥemed.
- Simon, Uriel (2013). Ozen milin tivḥan: Meḥḳarim be-darko ha-parshanit shel R. Avraham Ibn ʻEzra אזן מלין תבחן: מחקרים בדרכו הפרשנית של ר' אברהם אבן עזרא [The Ear Discerns Words: Studies in Ibn Ezra's Exegetical Methodology] (in Hebrew). Bar-Ilan University Press.
- Simon, Uriel (2021). Dyoḳan shel parshan: R. Avraham Ibn ʻEzra דיוקן של פרשן: ר' אברהם אבן עזרא [Abraham Ibn Ezra: A Portrait of a Commentator] (in Hebrew). Bar-Ilan University Press.

A festschrift was published in Simon's honor in 2000:

- Garsiel, Moshe; Vargon, Shmuel; Frisch, Amos, eds. (2000). Minḥot yedidut ṿe-hoḳarah le-Uriʼel Simon [Offerings of Friendship and Esteem for Uriel Simon]. ʻIyune Miḳra u-farshanut 5 (in Hebrew). Bar-Ilan University Press.
