= Ihud =

Unity איחוד
- Founders: Judah Leon Magnes; Martin Buber; Ernst Simon; Henrietta Szold
- Founded: 1942
- Ideology: Binationalism; Federalism; Cultural Zionism

Ihud (also spelled “Ichud”, Hebrew: איחוד, 'Unity') was a small binationalist Zionist political party founded by Judah Leon Magnes, Martin Buber, Ernst Simon and Henrietta Szold, former supporters of Brit Shalom, in 1942 as a binational response to the Biltmore Conference, which made the establishment of a Jewish Commonwealth in Palestine the policy of the Zionist movement. Other prominent members were David Werner Senator, Moshe Smilansky, agronomist Haim Margaliot-Kalvarisky (1868–1947), and Judge Joseph Moshe Valero.

Ihud advocated for an Arab–Jewish binational state rooted in equal political rights for Jews and Arabs in an undivided Palestine. Ihud termed this vision “political parity.” Furthermore, it argued that Jewish immigration should be regulated in accordance with the principle of “numerical parity” with the Arabs and the ability of Palestine to absorb immigrants economically. It proposed the creation of joint organs of government, and a division of the country into districts based on a communal basis.

== History ==
The establishment and platforms of Ihud should be considered within the larger historical context of the time, both in Palestine and worldwide. It is imperative to note the Jewish–Arab strife in Palestine and World War II as the backdrop of the creation of Ihud.

By then, the catastrophe of European Jewry (see the Holocaust) and the previous 1936–1939 Arab revolt in Palestine made it urgent for Ihud to salvage the Jewish community in Palestine while making it a viable community for the survivors of the Holocaust.

Magnes identified closely with the aims of Brit Shalom, a Jewish association focusing on the establishment of a Jewish cultural center as part of a binational state of Jews and Arabs in Palestine. Another member of Ihud, Natan Hofshi, was also a member of Brit Shalom. He was against the use of force under any circumstance. Magnes established the Ihud to replace the defunct Brit Shalom. He had preliminary discussions to form Ihud in July 1942. Ihud dedicated itself to promoting Brit Shalom’s beliefs in the political theatre.

== Platforms ==
The group held its first meeting on August 11, 1942. During this meeting, Magnes emphasized that there were six reasons for the advocacy for binationalism:

1. Warfare might destroy the Yishuv in Palestine;
2. A Jewish state in Palestine will breed hatred difficult to assuage for generations;
3. Nation state is not the way of Judaism but of all the nation;
4. The resulting state would not be a Jewish state but a secular state like all the nations;
5. Another centre of strife will be created for the New World;
6. Jews and Judaism can and will exist in the diaspora, with or without the state.

On September 3, 1942, the group decided to publish another letter to members of the Hebrew University staff clarifying its platforms The letter stated that Ihud adheres to the Zionist movement and regards the union between Jewish and Arab people essential for starting a Jewish homeland in Palestine. Specifically, the leaders of Ihud stated that their political aspirations of the association include:

1. Creating a political system based upon equal rights for both peoples;
2. Securing the support of the expanding Yishuv and the entire Jewish people for a federative union of the Middle East that includes the Land of Israel;
3. Creating an alliance between this federative union and the Anglo-American union as part of an alliance of all free nations, when it comes into being."

Ihud was against the partition plan. In April 1948, months after the UN Partition Plan was adopted by the United Nations, Magnes proposed an American trusteeship in Palestine and spoke with Warren Austin, US ambassador to the United Nations. Magnes stated that "partition is probably the principal cause of chaos in Palestine" and emphasized the importance of allowing Jews and Arabs to "be given an opportunity to exercise themselves the functions of government."

== Publications ==
The founders and representatives of Ihud conveyed their views through the publication of Ba'ayot (formerly known as Ba'ayot Hayom - Problems of the Time). The social democratic activist Rita Hinden agreed to arrange for the Fabian Colonial Bureau circulation manager to assist in the distribution of Ihud's pamphlets to a wider audience.

In the beginning of 1947, Ba'ayot printed an article featuring the thoughts of Albert Einstein on the most suitable approach to resolving the issue of Palestine. In response to prominent proponent of Zionism, British Labour Party member Richard Crossman's assertion that partition was the only fair solution left for the British, Einstein said: "He may be right; but I see no permanent solution other than one based on a bi-national administration under United Nations rule."

Ba'ayot also published "Towards Union in Palestine", which was a volume consisting of a compilation of essays in English.

After the foundation of the state of Israel, Ihud replaced its official journal Ba'ayot with a new periodical, Ner. Rabbi Binyamin established and edited Ner. The journal aimed to encourage the Israeli public to acknowledge and honor the rights of Arab citizens and to take accountability for the eviction of Arab residents from Israel. Ner continued publication until 1964, “thereby carrying the small flame of Brit Shalom’s moral-political tradition into the era of Jewish statehood.”

According to Sasson Sofer, writing in Zionism and the Foundations of Israeli Diplomacy (1998):

Ihud constituted the first instance in the history of Israel's politics of what happens when intellectuals seek to propose a compromise solution in the course of a violent national conflict. It demonstrated their organisational weakness and the fact that their political influence was marginal. Ihud presages the fate which was to befall Israel's intelligentsia whenever it approached the white-hot heart of the Israel–Arab conflict and sought to join in the political fray.

== Responses towards Ihud ==
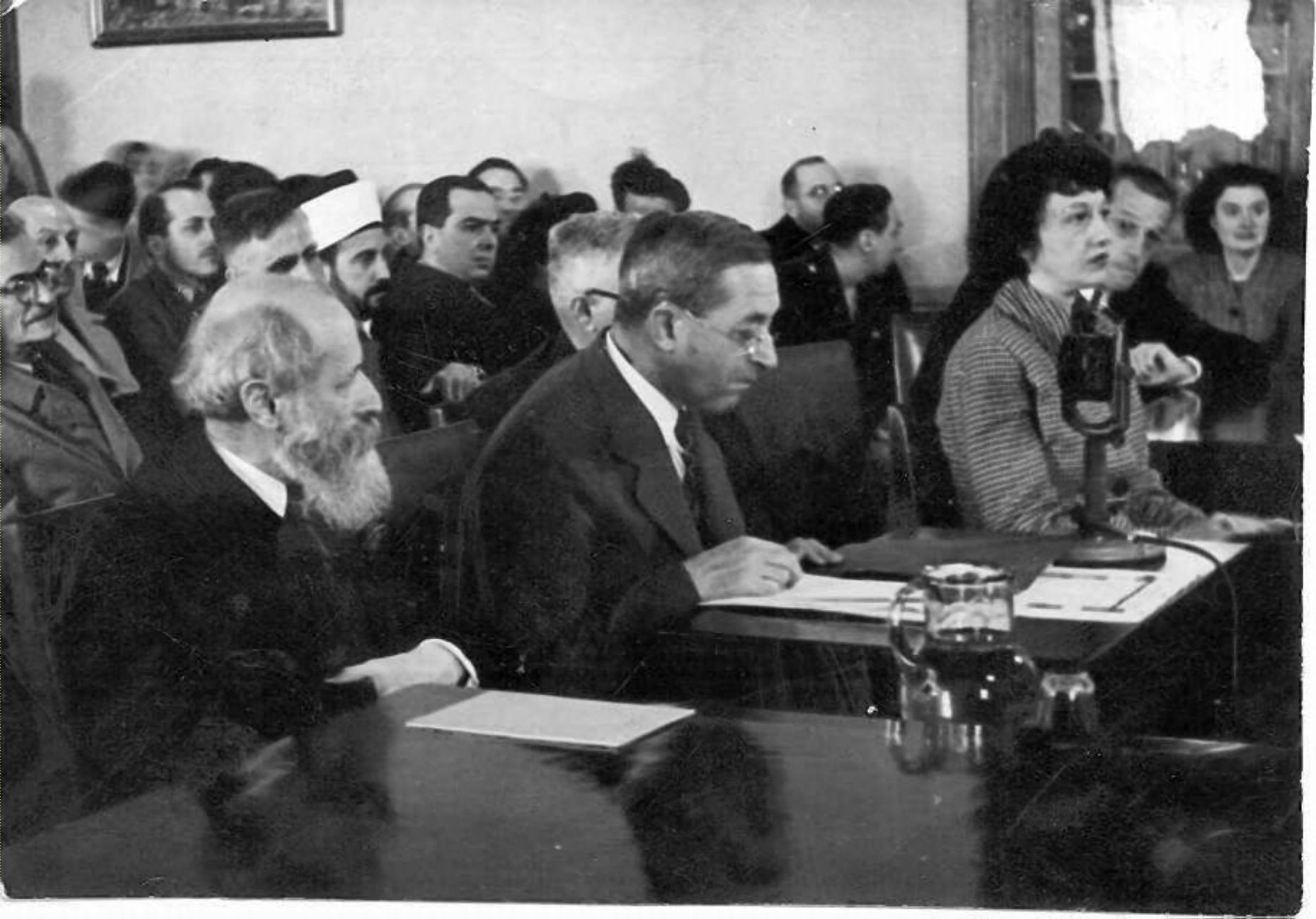
Magnes and Buber testifying before the Anglo-American Committee of Inquiry

The Ihud party presented its ideas to the Anglo-American Committee of Inquiry in 1946 and then to the United Nations Special Committee on Palestine in 1947. The Anglo-American Committee voted largely in favor of the proposals of Ihud, recommending an Economic Union in Palestine.

It was difficult to win approval of binationalism from Arab leaders. However, an agreement was achieved between Fawzi Darwish el Husseini, related to the Grand Mufti of Jerusalem, and the League for Jewish Arab Rapprochement and Cooperation, an organization founded in 1939 and allied with Ihud in 1942. However, al-Husseni was assassinated for his support for binationalism in November 1946.

Leading non-Jewish Zionists opposed the platforms of Ihud, including Sir John Hope Simpson (see Hope Simpson Enquiry) and Major General Sir Edward Spears. Zionist press in Britain also condemned Magnes, whom they argue “attack bitterly and [...] destroy the state of Israel” using his position at the Hebrew University for larger audiences.

An independent Jewish Press called Magnes a “quisling,” which means traitor, due to his position on binationalism. A Zionist paper The Reconstructionist approved Ihud’s proposal in its February 10, 1956 issue, recommending “the earnest consideration of the Ihud proposals by the Israeli government and by the World Zionist movement.” However, the paper later retracted its position and denounced the programs in a November issue.

Rav Tzair, a revisionist who had great admiration for Vladimir Jabotinsky, was upset that Ihud claimed that Palestine is "both legally and ethically theirs (the Arabs), and that they (the Arabs) are therefore entitled to remain its masters forever."

Magnes also attempted to form alliances with Agudat Yisrael, the ultra-orthodox non-Zionist organization for religious Jews; although he was not successful.

Political theorist Hannah Arendt rejected the platforms of Ihud because she considered Magnes' idea of binationalism an erroneous version of federalism as it merely substituted the Biltmore concept of Jewish supremacy in Palestine with the notion of Arab supremacy. She considered Magnes' vision in conflict with her commitment to federalism. Later, she supported Magnes' proposal for a trusteeship as a temporary solution for Jews and Arabs in Palestine.

Only Isaac Steinberg's Freeland League, which also comprised only a few hundred people, remained as a political ally, with which they were united above all by their rejection of the violence of "militant Zionism". In 1959, Ihud members founded an organisation called "Friends of the Freeman League".

== After the formation of the State of Israel in 1948 ==
Magnes resigned his position as the leader of Ihud the day after the UN announced its partition plan in Palestine.

During Israel’s War of Independence, Ihud criticized Jewish attacks on Arab civilians. It was critical of the “spirit of Masada (survival),” which Ihud deemed a glorification of unnecessary martyrdom.

When violence escalated in the aftermath of the 1948 War, Ihud issued a warning that posited military victory as dangerous precedents. “As members of Ihud, we do not welcome triumphs on the battlefield, which are in essence the spilling of blood, ruination, and destruction for everyone created in God’s image.”

Ihud also denounced the raid on the Jordanian village of Qibya in October 1953, and in general condemned reprisal attacks carried out by the IDF against Arabs.

However, by the late 1960s, the already marginal binationalism platform was even more sidelined because of the political reality of Israel, and Ihud became irrelevant in the political theatre.
