= Judah Leon Magnes =

Jewish rabbi (1877-1948)

- יהודה לייב מאגנס
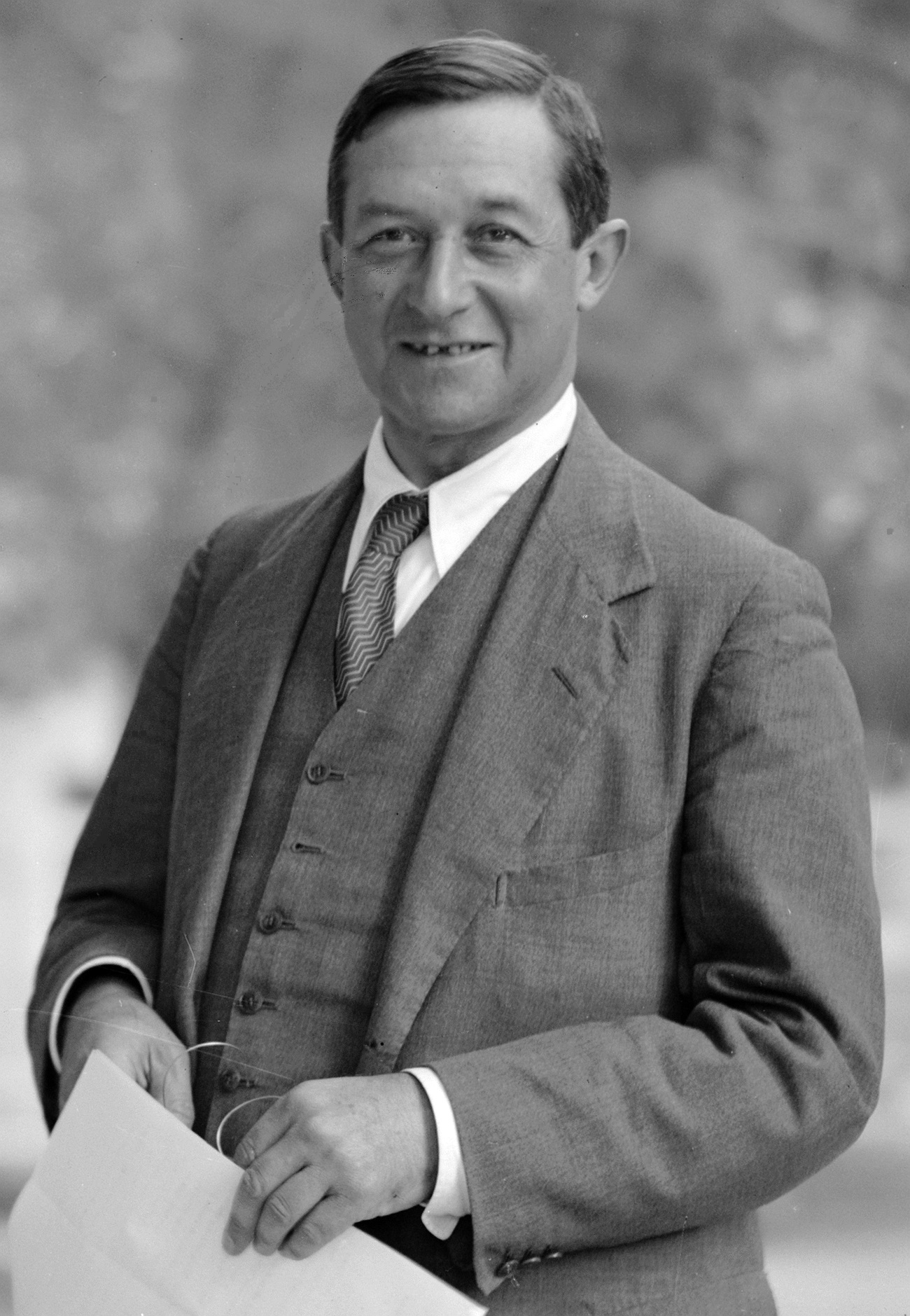

Chancellor of the Hebrew University of Jerusalem
- In office 1 April 1925 – 1935
- Preceded by: University established
- Succeeded by: office abolished Himself (as President); Hugo Bergmann (as Rector)

1st President of the Hebrew University of Jerusalem
- In office 1935 – 27 October 1948
- Rector: Hugo Bergmann; Abraham Fraenkel; Leon Roth; Leo Aryeh Mayer; Michael Fekete
- Preceded by: office established Himself (as Chancellor)
- Succeeded by: Leon Simon (acting); Selig Brodetsky

Personal details
- Born: July 5, 1877 San Francisco, California, USA
- Died: October 27, 1948 (aged 71) New York City, New York
- Spouse: Beatrice Lowenstein

Judah Leon Magnes (Hebrew: יהודה לייב מאגנס; July 5, 1877 – October 27, 1948) was a prominent Reform rabbi in both the United States of America and Mandatory Palestine. He is best remembered as a leader in the pacifist movement of the World War I period, his advocacy of a binational Jewish-Arab state in Palestine, and as one of the most widely recognized voices of 20th century American Reform Judaism. Magnes served as the only chancellor of the Hebrew University of Jerusalem (1925–1935), and later as its first president (1935–1948).

== Biography ==
Magnes was born in San Francisco to David and Sophie (Abrahamson) who named him Julian. He changed his name to Judah as a young man. As a young boy, Magnes's family moved to Oakland, California, where he attended Hebrew school at First Hebrew Congregation, and was taught by Ray Frank, the first Jewish woman to preach formally from a pulpit in the United States.

Magnes's views of the Jewish people were strongly influenced by First Hebrew's Rabbi Levy, and it was at First Hebrew's building on 13th and Clay that Magnes first began preaching. His bar mitzvah speech of 1890 was quoted at length in the Oakland Tribune.

Magnes graduated from Oakland High School as a valedictorian in 1894. He then studied at the University of Cincinnati, where he gained a degree of notoriety in a campaign against censorship of the "Class annual" of 1898 by the university faculty. He graduated from the University of Cincinnati with an A.B. in 1898. He also attended rabbinical seminary at Hebrew Union College, and was ordained a rabbi in June 1900. He then went to study in Germany. He studied Judaism at the Berlin Jewish College, Lehranstalt, and pursued his doctoral studies at Berlin University, where he studied under Friedrich Paulsen and Friedrich Delitzsch, and at the University of Heidelberg. It was while he was in Berlin that he began embracing aspects of Zionist thought, though always strongly opposing its nationalistic elements. He spent time traveling through Eastern Europe, and visited Jewish communities in Germany, Poland, and Galicia. In December 1902, he received a PhD in philosophy from the University of Heidelberg, and returned to the United States in 1903.

On October 19, 1908, Magnes married Beatrice Lowenstein of New York, who happened to be Louis Marshall's sister-in-law.

=== New York ===
In America, he spent most of his professional life in New York City, where he helped found the American Jewish Committee in 1906. Magnes was also an influential force behind the organization of the Jewish community in the city, serving as president throughout its existence from 1908 to 1922. The Kehillah oversaw aspects of Jewish culture, religion, education and labor issues, in addition to helping to integrate America's German and East European Jewish communities. He was also the president of the Society for the Advancement of Judaism from 1912 to 1920.

The religious views Magnes extolled as a Reform rabbi were not within the mainstream. Magnes favored a more traditional approach to Judaism, fearing the overly assimilationist tendencies of his peers. Magnes delivered a Passover sermon in 1910 at Congregation Emanu-El of the City of New York in which he advocated changes in the Reform ritual to incorporate elements of traditional Judaism, expressing his concern that younger members of the congregation were driven to seek spirituality in other religions that cannot be obtained at Congregation Emanu-El. He advocated for restoration of the Bar Mitzvah ceremony and criticized the Union Prayer Book, advocating for a return to the traditional prayer book. The disagreement over this issue led him to resign from Congregation Emanu-El that year. From 1911–12 he was Rabbi of the Conservative Congregation B'nai Jeshurun.

==== The Kehillah ====
In New York he set himself the task of uniting the Jewish communities. In 1880 the city contained around 50,000 Jews mostly of German origin. By 1900 there were nearly a million Jews, most coming from what is now Poland, Hungary, Romania, Belarus and Ukraine, making it the largest Jewish population outside of Europe and the Russian Empire. On 11 October 1908 he was chairman of a conference of Jewish organisations, the invitations to which, in English and Yiddish, had also been signed by labour leader Joseph Barondess and Judge Otto A. Rosalsky, amongst others. The conference authorised the formation of a representative community, the Kehillah, and gave Magnes the power to appoint an executive committee. The 25-man committee included Professor Solomon Schechter and Joseph Silverman. They called a convention in February 1909 to form a constituent assembly. Two hundred and twenty-two organisations responded, including 74 synagogues and 42 mutual benefit societies, out of some 3,500 Jewish organisations existing in the city at the time. The Kehillah's aim was "to wipe out invidious distinctions between East European and West European, foreigner and native, Uptown and Downtown Jew, rich and poor; and make us realize that the Jews are one people with a common history and with common hopes."

The committee proceeded to set up a series of boards, or bureaus: Education (1910), Social Morals (1912); Industry (1914); and Philanthropic Research (1916). The first secretary of the Bureau of Education was Henrietta Szold. A report by Mordecai Kaplan revealed that of some 200,000 Jewish children of school age no more than 50,000 received any form of Jewish education. By 1916 the Bureau directed or supervised 200 schools, 600 teachers and 35,000 pupils. Funding was dependent on wealthy New York Jews such as Jacob Schiff, Felix M. Warburg and Louis Marshall who made an endowment for girls' education. The Bureau eventually evolved into the Jewish Education Committee of New York. Magnes was also closely involved with the Social Morals Bureau which held investigations into the white slave trade and Jewish underworld. Its work helped to reduce Jewish juvenile delinquency in New York from 30% to 14% over a period of 20 years. In the Bureau of Industry he was Chairman of the Conference of the Furriers Trade.

==== The American Jewish Joint Distribution Committee ====
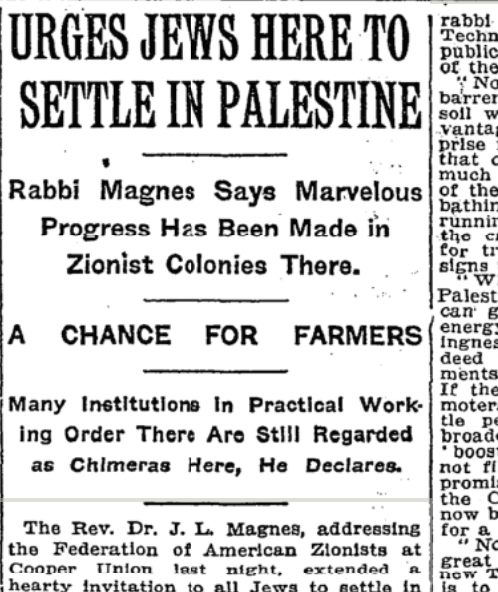
Coverage in The New York Times of Rabbi Magnes' speech to the Federation of American Zionists at Cooper Union inviting Jews to settle in Palestine, May 19, 1912.

At the end of 1914, with the outbreak of the First World War, Magnes became involved in collecting funds for the Jewish population in Palestine. The following year, a greater crisis arose with the war on the Eastern Front, devastating the Jews of the Pale of Settlement. Magnes devoted all his energies to this issue. Firstly he set about coordinating the three bodies that had been set up to face the catastrophe. These were the American Jewish Relief Committee, associated with the Kehillah and the American Jewish Committee, the Central Relief Committee from the Orthodox community, and the People's Relief Committee set up by labour organisations. The result was the creation of a single body called the American Jewish Joint Distribution Committee.

In December 1915, a fund-raising appeal was launched at Carnegie Hall. His emotional speech raised a million dollars in donations. By the end of 1915 around five million dollars had been raised. In the spring of 1916 Magnes visited Germany and Poland to organise the distribution of the funds. The visit, via Scandinavia, started in Hamburg and Berlin, from there, with the assistance of the German authorities, he visited Poland and Vilna. He had to overcome the suspicions of the Zionist leadership in Europe, who accused him of bias. Despite this, he was able to organise the distribution of funds bridging the gulf between the Central and Eastern European Jewish communities.

Amongst the leaders he met were Max Warburg, head of the German Jewish Society (Hilfsverein), and Rabbi Leo Baeck, then Jewish Chaplain in the German Army. He returned to America in the winter of 1916 and launched a fresh relief appeal to raise ten million dollars. At one meeting he was again able to raise a million dollars in donations and pledges in a single evening. With President Woodrow Wilson's decision to enter the war, he switched his attention to anti-war campaigning.

==== Pacifism and the anti-war movement ====
Magnes was a Pacifist activist. According to Israeli professor Arthur A. Goren, he considered himself a follower of Mahatma Gandhi and the prophet Jeremiah, and opposed all forms of nationalism by military force. He had developed Pacifist views in 1898 as a result of the Spanish–American War. Magnes believed it to be an "unrighteous" war. Following the assassination of President William McKinley, who had led the United States into war with Spain, by an anarchist activist, Magnes wrote to his parents from Europe that he was not "enraged at the anarchists for it at all. In my opinion, dishonest men in public office are greater anarchists than those who kill a president once in twenty years".

Following the United States' entry into the war in Europe in the spring of 1917, Magnes switched all his attention to campaigning against it. He became one of the movement's high-profile leaders. Like most of its leaders his sympathies were with the working classes. People such Eugene Debs who was sentenced to ten years in prison for his activities; Norman Thomas; Roger Nash Baldwin; Scott Nearing; Morris Hillquit, who took 22% of the vote in New York's Mayoral elections on an anti-war platform; and Oswald Garrison Villard. Most of these men were involved in what became the People's Council of America for Democracy and the Terms of Peace with Magnes its first chairman. On 30 May 1917 he gave the keynote address to a mass meeting of fifteen thousand people in the Madison Square Gardens. A follow-up meeting in Minneapolis was banned and hastily reconvened in Chicago but with a military force threatening to break it up.

Magnes moved home in Connecticut because of hostility from his neighbours and was interviewed by an agent from the Department of Justice. One of his colleagues from the "Joint", B. D. Bogen, was questioned by Attorney-General Thomas Watt Gregory about Magnes' activities.

Magnes worked with the newly-formed National Civil Liberties Bureau which defended pacifists and conscientious objectors. In America more than 2,000 prosecutions were brought against war-resisters under the Selective Service Act of 1917 or the Espionage Act of 1917; Magnes avoided prosecution since he was over conscription age.

Despite coming from a wealthy background—by 1920 he had become financially independent—Magnes reacted to the Russian Revolution with enthusiasm; in 1921 he was the spokesman at Philadelphia for the Society for Medical Relief to Soviet Russia. He also spoke on behalf of the Italians Sacco and Vanzetti.

=== Palestine ===
Magnes first visited Ottoman Palestine in 1907, growing a beard in solidarity with the Jewish colonists. At Jaffa he was told of the plans for a Jewish-only town, north of Jaffa, to be called Tel Aviv. He was sceptical that it would ever come about. He made an extensive tour of the region, travelling on horseback and camping at night. The tour included reaching the summit of Mount Hermon. He returned to America by way of the seventh Zionist Congress in The Hague. His wife accompanied him on his second visit in 1912. They stayed in Jerusalem where there was some discussion of establishing a Hebrew University. They also visited Merhavia and Degania in the Galilee.

Magnes agreed, however, with the overall anti-Zionist attitudes of Reform Judaism at the time; he strongly disapproved of nationalistic aspects within Judaism, which Zionism represented and supported. To him, Jews living in the Diaspora and Jews living in Palestine were of equal significance to Judaism and Jewish culture; he agreed that a renewed Jewish community in Eretz Israel would enhance Jewish life within the Diaspora. Magnes emigrated to Mandate Palestine in 1922 and maintained that emigration to Eretz Israel was a matter of individual choice; it did not reflect any kind of "negation of the Diaspora", or support for Zionism. He thought that the land of Israel should be built in a "decent manner", or not built at all. He was a "disciple" of the thinker and writer Ahad Ha'am.

In both America and Palestine, Magnes played a key role in founding the Hebrew University of Jerusalem in 1918 along with Albert Einstein and Chaim Weizmann. However, the three did not get along, and when, in 1928, Magnes, who was initially responsible only for the university's finances and administrative staff, had his authority extended to academic and professional matters, Einstein resigned from the Board of Governors. Einstein wrote:

The bad thing about the business was that the good Felix Warburg, thanks to his financial authority ensured that the incapable Magnes was made director of the Institute, a failed American rabbi, who, through his dilettantish enterprises had become uncomfortable to his family in America, who very much hoped to dispatch him honorably to some exotic place. This ambitious and weak person surrounded himself with other morally inferior men, who did not allow any decent person to succeed there ... These people managed to poison the atmosphere there totally and to keep the level of the institution low

Magnes served as the first chancellor of the Hebrew University (1925) and later as its president (1935–1948; followed by Sir Leon Simon as acting president, 1948 to 1949). Magnes believed that the university was the ideal place for Jewish and Arab cooperation, and worked tirelessly to advance this goal.

Magnes's responded to the 1929 Palestinian riots with a call for a binational solution to the burgeoning Israeli-Palestinian conflict. In his view, Palestine should be neither Jewish nor Arab. Rather, he advocated a single state in which equal rights would be shared by all, a view shared by the group Brit Shalom, an organization with which Magnes is often associated, but never joined. Magnes objected to the concept of a specifically Jewish state, and dedicated the rest of his life to reconciliation with the Palestinian Arabs. In a speech given at the reopening of the university following the 1929 riots Magnes was heckled by members of the audience for speaking of the need for Jews and Arabs to find ways to live and work together. He was also attacked in the Jewish press.

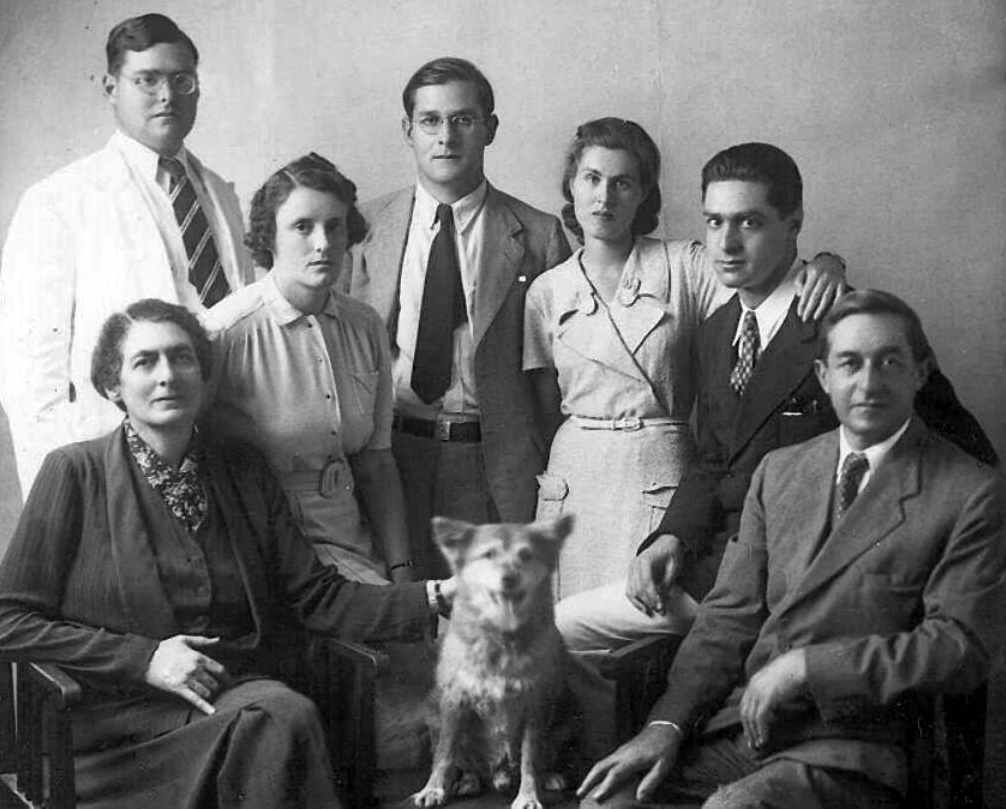
Magnes and his family in the 1930s

In late 1937, Magnes welcomed the Hyamson-Newcombe proposal for the creation of an independent Palestinian state with all citizens having equal rights and each community having autonomy, writing that it offered the 'portals to an agreement' between Jews and Arabs in Palestine. This proposal was a document put together by leading a British Arabist, Colonel Stewart Newcombe, and prominent British Jewish binationalist, Albert M Hyamson. Magnes then tried to use the document to work with moderate Arabs towards an alternative to partition that was not tainted by official British endorsement, however this did not work out. Magnes's enthusiasm for the Newcombe-Hyamson proposal can be explained by his commitment to Arab-Jewish cooperation, a binational state and his acknowledgement of the importance of demographic balance for Arab negotiators.

When the Peel Commission made its 1937 recommendations about partition and population transfer for Palestine, Magnes sounded the alarm:

With the permission of the Arabs we will be able to receive hundreds of thousands of persecuted Jews in Arab lands [...] Without the permission of the Arabs even the four hundred thousand [Jews] that now are in Palestine will remain in danger, in spite of the temporary protection of British bayonets. With partition a new Balkan is made [..] New York Times, July 18, 1937.

With increasing persecution of European Jews, the outbreak of World War II and continuing violence in Mandate Palestine, Magnes realized that his vision of a voluntary negotiated treaty between Arabs and Jews had become politically impossible. In an article in January 1942 in Foreign Affairs he suggested a joint British-American initiative to prevent the division of Mandate Palestine. The Biltmore Conference in May that year caused Magnes and others to break from the Zionist mainstream's revised demand for a "Jewish Commonwealth". As a result, he and Henrietta Szold founded the small, binationalist political party, Ihud (Unity).

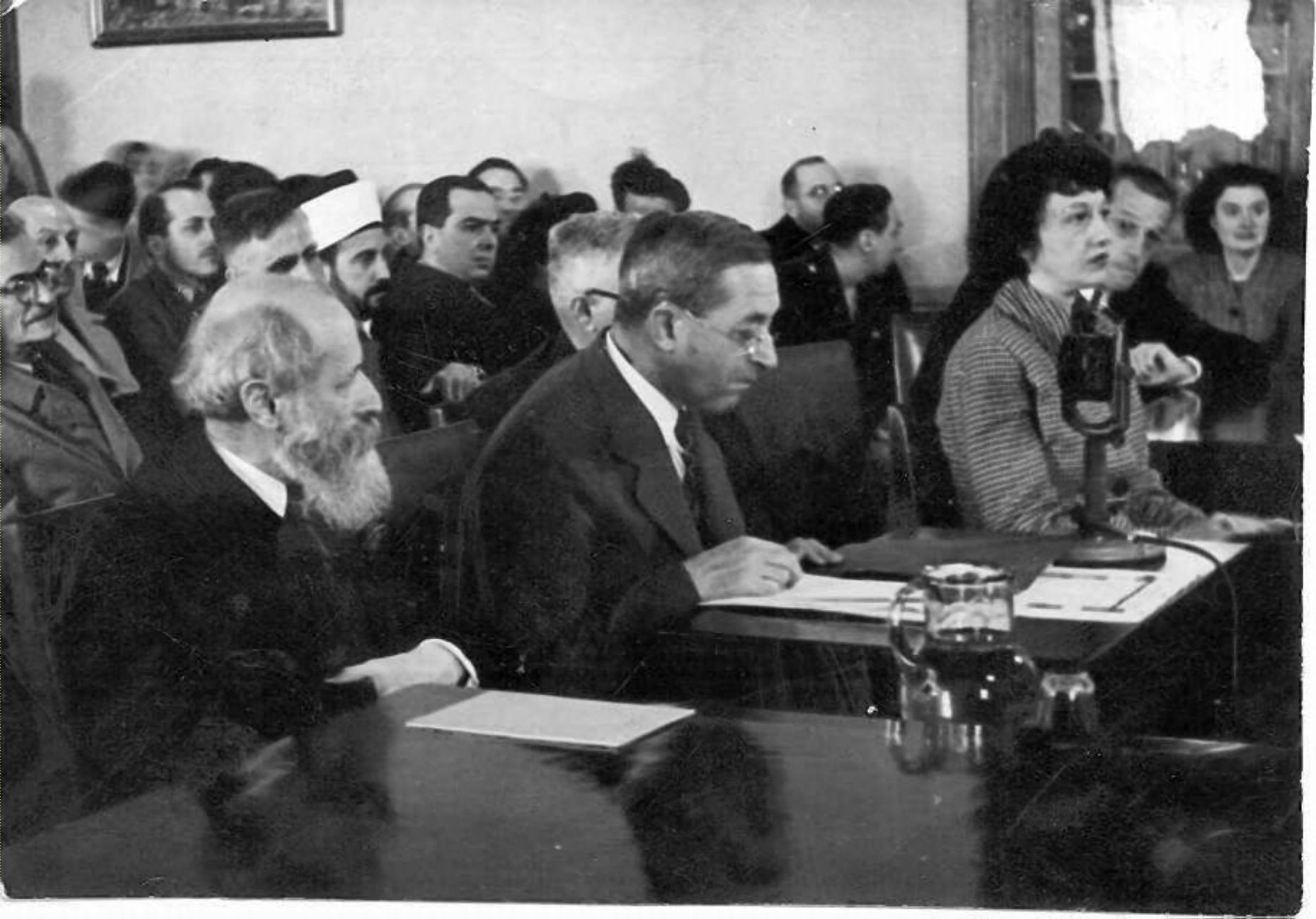
Martin Buber (left) and Judah Leon Magnes testifying before the Anglo-American Committee of Inquiry in Jerusalem (1946)

Magnes opposed the United Nations Partition Plan for Palestine. He submitted 11 objections to partition to the United Nations Special Committee on Palestine.

By mid-1948, when the 1948 Palestine war between the Jews and Arabs of Palestine was in full swing, Magnes was pessimistic, and feared an Arab victory due to the Arabs' overwhelming numerical superiority. Magnes expressed the hope that if a Jewish state were declared, the United States would impose economic sanctions, saying that there could be no war without money or ammunition. During a conversation with George Marshall on May 4, 1948, he asked the US to impose sanctions on both sides. Calling the Yishuv an "artificial community", he predicted that sanctions would halt "the Jewish war machine".

He supported a March 1948 US trusteeship proposal, in which the UN would freeze the partition decision and force both sides into a trusteeship with a temporary government ruling Palestine, until conditions suited another arrangement, in the hope that there would be understanding and peace talks would be possible. He predicted that even if a Jewish state was established and defeated the Arabs, it would experience a never-ending series of wars with the Arabs.

Magnes returned to the United States in April 1948 to participate in an anti-partition campaign. When he left, his position at Hebrew University was in jeopardy, as more staff moved against him due to his views. According to Israeli historian Benny Morris, the Hadassah medical convoy massacre effectively ended his dream of binationalism, writing that "An Arab ambush on 13 April 1948 of a Jewish convoy bearing doctors and nurses traveling through East Jerusalem to the Hebrew University - Hadassah Medical School campus on Mount Scopus - in which seventy-eight were slaughtered - was in effect the final nail in the coffin of Magnes' binationalism. It was not that he publicly recanted. But he understood that it was a lost cause - and that his own standing in the Yishuv had been irreparably shattered." At the funerals of the victims, eighteen staff members from Hebrew University signed a petition protesting Magnes' view. The campaign was led by Professor Friedrich Simon Bodenheimer, who called Magnes a "traitor". Magnes returned to the United States days later.

Following the Israeli Declaration of Independence, Magnes ceased advocating binationalism, and accepted the existence of the state of Israel, telling one of his sons "do you think that in my heart I am not glad too that there is a state? I just did not think it was to be." On May 15, 1948, following the declaration of independence, he called Israeli president Chaim Weizmann to express congratulations.

During the 1948 Arab-Israeli War, Magnes lobbied for an armistice, and proposed a plan for a federation between Israel and a Palestinian state which he called the "United States of Palestine", under which the two states would be independent, but operate joint foreign and defense policies, with Jerusalem as the shared capital. He spoke with American, Israeli, and Arab officials, who expressed some interest in his plans.

During the summer of 1948, he also began to lobby increasingly for a solution to the Palestinian refugee problem. Just before his death, he withdrew from the leadership of American Jewish Joint Distribution Committee, a welfare organization he had helped establish. The reason was that the AJJDC had not answered his plea for help for the Palestinian refugees: "How can I continue to be officially associated with an aid organization which apparently so easily can ignore such a huge and acute refugee problem?"

Magnes had been suffering from increasingly-poor health in 1948, and was already seriously ill when he left Palestine in April. On June 10, he suffered a stroke and had to be hospitalized for several weeks. Magnes died in New York of a heart attack on October 27, 1948, at the age of 71.

==== Yiddish and Hebrew ====
Magnes' Yiddish and German-speaking father arrived in San Francisco in 1863 where he abandoned Yiddish. His mother was also German-speaking. Magnes grew up with English as his first language but his command of German was sufficient for his two years studying in Germany. In 1895 he heard Russian orator Rabbi Hirsch Masliansky lecture in Hebrew and this awoke his interest in modern Hebrew. While in Germany he joined a group of young Zionists dedicated to learning Hebrew. He also made a determined effort to learn Yiddish which he put to good use when working with new immigrants in New York. Once in Palestine he studied and became fluent in French, the other major European language used in the Middle East. He also studied Arabic but never gained a command beyond formal exchanges.

Hebrew was the instructional language at the Hebrew University. In May 1927 Martin Buber, a friend of Magnes', was invited to lecture at the university. When a group of students demanded that he lecture in Hebrew rather than German he refused and had to be persuaded by Magnes not to cancel his speech. The same year David Shapiro, the publisher of the New York Yiddish daily Der Tog announced he would raise $50,000 for an endowed chair of Yiddish at the university. This provoked such a strong reaction, with posters around the city accusing the university of treason and demonstrators outside Magnes' house under the slogan "The chair of Jargon, the end of the university", that Magnes was forced to decline the offer. It was not until 1949 that the university had a chair in Yiddish with David Sedan as its first lecturer.

Magnes could speak Hebrew eloquently on great occasions, but it was with an American accent and in a literary style. He was more comfortable with English. In New York he had been capable of moving large audiences with his public speaking, such as his 1915 fundraiser for the Joint Distribution Committee at the Carnegie Hall, or the Madison Square Gardens anti-war rally in 1917; but in Palestine, where Hebrew was insisted on at public gatherings, he was not able to have the same impact.

== Legacy ==
Memorializing his passing, the Union of American Hebrew Congregations wrote of Magnes that he was:

...One of the most distinguished rabbis of our age, a son of the Hebrew Union College, a former rabbi of Temple Emanu-El, New York, the founder and first chancellor of the Hebrew University, the leader of the movement for good will between Jews and Arabs in Palestine, a man of prophetic stature by whose life and works the traditions of the rabbinate, as well as the spiritual traditions of all mankind were enriched.

The Judah L. Magnes Museum, in Berkeley, California, the first Jewish Museum of the West, was named in Magnes' honor, and the museum's Western Jewish History Center has a large collection of papers, correspondence, publications, and photographs of Judah Magnes and members of his family. It also contains the conference proceedings of The Life and Legacy of Judah L. Magnes, an International Symposium that the museum sponsored, in 1982.

The main avenue in Hebrew University's Givat Ram campus is named after Magnes, and so is their publishing press the Magnes Press.

== See also ==
- Martin Buber, Ernst Simon
- Brit Shalom
- Binational solution
- Ihud

== Published works ==
- Aknin, Joseph ben Judah. (Editor), Berlin, 1904.
- The Jewish Community of New York City. New York: n.p., 1909.
- Report to the Joint Distribution Committee. Berlin: Commission of the American Jewish Relief Funds, 1917.
- Russia and Germany at Brest-Litovsk: A Documentary History of the Peace Negotiations. New York: Rand School of Social Science, 1919.
- Amnesty for Political Prisoners: Address Delivered in Washington, D.C. on April 17, 1919. New York: National Civil Liberties Bureau, n.d. [1919].
- War-time Addresses, 1917–1921. New York: Thomas Seltzer, 1923.
- Like All the Nations? Jerusalem, 1930.
- Addresses by the Chancellor of the Hebrew University. Jerusalem: Azriel Press, 1936.
- The Bond. Two letters to Gandhi with Martin Buber. Rubin Mass, Jerusalem, April, 1939.
- Addresses by the Chancellor of the Hebrew University. Jerusalem, 1946.
- In the Perplexity of the Times. Jerusalem, 1946.
- Palestine — Divided or United? The Case for a Bi-National Palestine before the United Nations. With M. Reiner; Lord Samuel; E. Simon; M. Smilansky. Jerusalem: Ihud, 1947.
- Arab-Jewish Unity: Testimony before the Anglo-American Inquiry Commission for Ihud (Union) Association. With Martin Buber. London: Victod Gollancz. 1947.
- Towards Union in Palestine, Essays on Zionism and Jewish-Arab Cooperation. With M. Buber, E. Simon. Ihud, Jerusalem, 1947.
