= Ernst Simon =

German-Jewish educator and religious philosopher (1900–1988)

Ernst Akiva Simon
- עקיבא ארְנְסְט סימון
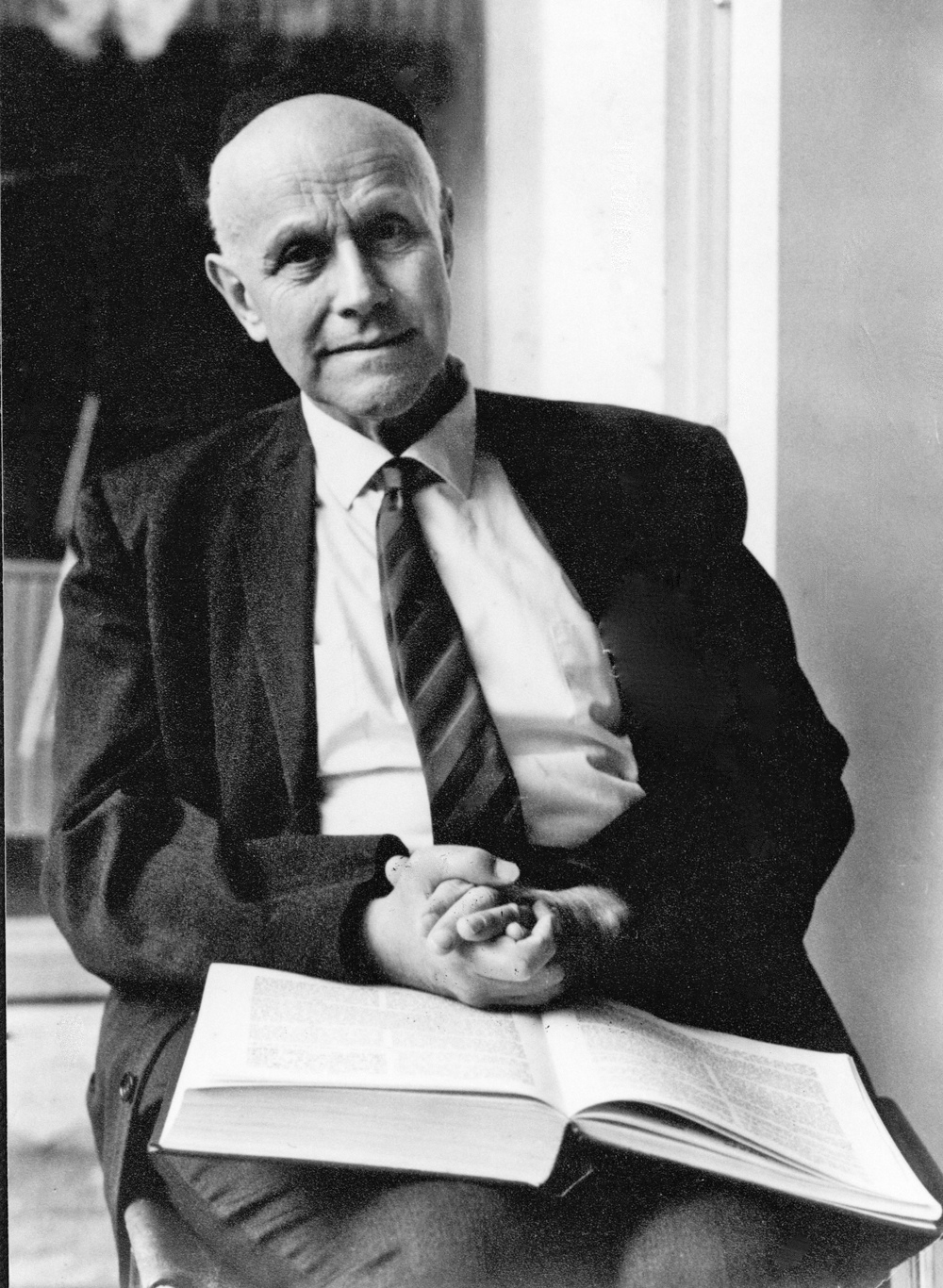
- Born: 15 March 1900; Berlin, Germany
- Died: 18 August 1988 (aged 88); Jerusalem, Israel
- Education: Hebrew Reali School Haifa
- Occupations: Educator, religious philosopher
- Known for: Co-founder of Brit Shalom; Co-founder of the Ihud party
- Awards: Israel Prize (1967)

Ernst Akiva Simon (Hebrew: עקיבא ארְנְסְט סימון; March 15, 1900 – August 18, 1988) was a German-Jewish educator and religious philosopher who was born in Berlin and died in Jerusalem.

== Teaching career and political activism ==
In the 1920s, Ernst Simon co-founded Brit Shalom along with Martin Buber, an organization espousing a binational solution for promoting the co-existence of Jews and Arabs in the State of Israel. From 1930 to 1933 he taught at the Hebrew Reali School Haifa, headed by Arthur Biram. In 1942, he was one of the founders of the binationalist Ihud party.

== Published works ==
- Aufbau im Untergang. Jüdische Erwachsenenbildung im nationalsozialistischen Deutschland als geistiger Widerstand. Tübingen: Mohr 1959. (Schriftenreihe wissenschaftlicher Abhandlungen des Leo Baeck Institute of Jews from Germany. 2).
- Brücken. Gesammelte Aufsätze. Heidelberg: Schneider 1965.
- Selbstdarstellung. In: Pädagogik in Selbstdarstellungen. Hamburg: Meiner, Bd. 1 (1975), S. 272–333.
- Entscheidung zum Judentum. Essays und Vorträge. Frankfurt a.M.: Suhrkamp Verlag 1980. (Bibliothek Suhrkamp. 641).
- Sechzig Jahre gegen den Strom. Briefe von 1917-1984. Hrsg. vom Leo-Baeck-Institut, Jerusalem. Tübingen: Mohr Siebeck 1998. (Schriftenreihe wissenschaftlicher Abhandlungen des Leo-Baeck-Instituts. 59). ISBN 3-16-147000-1

== Awards and recognition ==
Minister of Education Zalman Aran (left) awarding Simon the Israel Prize in 1967

In 1967, Simon was awarded the Israel Prize, for education.

== Family ==
Ernst married Tatiana Rappaport. Their child Uriel Simon would go on to become a biblical scholar and professor at Bar-Ilan University.

== See also ==
- List of Israel Prize recipients
