= Azriel Genack =

American physicist

Azriel Genack is an American physicist, currently a distinguished professor at Queens College, City University of New York, and also a published author. His research specializes in microwave and optical propagation.

Genack received his B.A. and Ph.D. from Columbia University. Together with Victor Kopp and Daniel Neugroschl, he is a co-founder of Chiral Photonics.

Genack is a leader of the CUNY Alliance for Inclusion.
