= Brit Shalom (political organization) =

Political group of Jewish Zionist intellectuals in Mandatory Palestine

Brit Shalom ברית שלום تحالف السلام
- Founded: 1925
- Dissolved: c. 1930s
- Ideology: Cultural Zionism; Bi-national state Jewish–Arab unity

Brit Shalom (Hebrew: ברית שלום, lit. "covenant of peace"; Arabic: تحالف السلام, Tahalof Essalam; also Jewish–Palestinian Peace Alliance) was a group of Jewish Zionist intellectuals in Mandatory Palestine, founded in 1925.

== History ==
Brit Shalom sought peaceful coexistence between Arabs and Jews in Palestine. Its goal was the creation of a centre for Jewish cultural life in Palestine, echoing the earlier ideas of Ahad Ha'am. At the time, Brit Shalom supported the establishment of a bi-national state where Jews and Arabs would have equal rights. They started a monthly magazine, Sheifoteinu and organized Arabic courses for Jews living in Mandatory Palestine.

Their main goal was to pursue cooperation amongst Jewish and Arabs and they believed that a Jewish majority was not as crucial for the creation of a Jewish state as the dialogue between the Yishuv and the Arab authorities.

Brit Shalom supporters and founders included economist and sociologist Arthur Ruppin, philosopher Martin Buber, Hugo Bergmann, historian Hans Kohn, Gershom Scholem, Henrietta Szold and Israel Jacob Kligler. Albert Einstein also voiced support. Judah Leon Magnes, one of the authors of the program, never joined the organization.

Brit Shalom became quite unpopular because of their stance on the 1929 Palestine riots. In fact, they thought Zionism was partially responsible for the outbreak of violence.

A letter from Arthur Ruppin to Hans Kohn in May 1930 states:

In the foundations of Brith Shalom one of the determining factors was that the Zionist aim has no equal example in history. The aim is to bring the Jews as second nation into a country which already is settled as a nation - and fulfill this through peaceful means. History has seen such penetration by one nation into a strange land only by conquest, but it has never occurred that a nation will freely agree that another nation should come and demand full equality of rights and national autonomy at its side. The uniqueness of this case prevents its being, in my opinion, dealt with in conventional political-legal terms. It requires special contemplation and study. Brith Shalom should be the forum in which the problem is discussed and investigated.

Ruppin held a senior position within the Jewish Agency as Director of the Palestine Land Development Company. The group disintegrated by mid 1936 due to the rise to power of Adolf Hitler and the increased necessity to encourage Jewish immigration.

In 1942, Magnes and supporters of Brit Shalom formed the political party Ihud which also advocated binationalism.

== Bibliography ==
- Morris, Benny (2013). One State, Two States: Resolving the Israel/Palestine Conflict. Yale University Press. ISBN 9780300164442.

== See also ==
- Arab–Israeli peace projects
- Peace process in the Israeli–Palestinian conflict
- Sectarian conflict in Mandatory Palestine
- Cultural Zionism
- One-state solution
