= One-state solution =

Proposed resolution of the Israeli–Palestinian conflict

The one-state solution is a proposed approach to the Israeli–Palestinian peace process that envisions a single state within the boundaries of the former Mandatory Palestine, standing in contrast to the two-state solution. It is sometimes described as a bi-national state, reflecting the idea that it could provide self-determination to Israelis and Palestinians within a shared state. The term one-state reality refers to the view that the current situation in the Israeli–Palestinian conflict amounts to a single de facto political space.

Map of Israel, the West Bank, the Gaza Strip, and the Golan Heights

It is a potential resolution to the conflict through the creation of a unitary, federal or confederate Israeli–Palestinian state, encompassing Israel, the Palestinian territories (comprising the West Bank and the Gaza Strip), and potentially the Golan Heights (which is internationally recognised as part of Syria). Perspectives differ: some argue that such a model would alter Israel's identity as a Jewish state and leave the Palestinians without national independence, while others view it as an equitable framework for ending the conflict.

Though increasingly debated in academic circles, the one-state solution has remained outside the range of official diplomatic efforts to resolve the conflict, which have historically favoured a two-state solution. This view is also reflected in most Palestinian and Israeli opinion polls.

An Israeli think tank has analyzed possible one-state models (including a confederation because it differs from two totally separate states).

- One such model is the unitary state, which would comprise a single government with citizenship and equal rights for every ethnic and religious group in the land, similar to the legal arrangement of the British Mandate for Palestine. Some Israelis advocate a version of this model in which Israel annexes the West Bank (but not the Gaza Strip) and grants Israeli citizenship to all of the Palestinians living there, thereby integrating the region and gaining a larger Arab minority, but remaining a Jewish and democratic state.
- A second model calls for Israel to annex the West Bank and possibly Gaza and integrate it as a Palestinian autonomous region or regions.
- A third model involves creating a federal state with a central government and federated districts, some of which would be Israeli and others Palestinian.
- A fourth model — something between two states and one state, depending on the governance structure — is a confederation in which independent Israeli and Palestinian states share powers in some areas, and give Israelis and Palestinians residency rights in each other's states.

== Historical background ==
=== Antiquity until World War I ===
The area between the Mediterranean Sea and the Jordan River has been controlled by various national groups throughout history. A number of groups, including the Canaanites, the Israelites (who later became the Jews), the Babylonians, Persians, Greeks, Jews, Romans, Byzantines, Umayyads, Abbasids, Seljuk Turks, Crusaders, Mamluks, Ottomans, the British, Israelis, Jordanians, and Egyptians have controlled the region at one time or another. From 1516 until the end of World War I, the region was controlled by the Ottoman Empire.

=== Ottoman and later British control ===
From 1915 to 1916, the British High Commissioner in Egypt, Sir Henry McMahon, corresponded by letters with Sayyid Hussein bin Ali, the father of Pan Arabism. These letters were later known as the Hussein–McMahon Correspondence. McMahon promised Hussein and his Arab followers the territory of the Ottoman Empire in exchange for assistance in driving out the Ottoman Turks. Hussein interpreted these letters as promising the region of Palestine to the Arabs. McMahon and the Churchill White Paper maintained that Palestine had been excluded from the territorial promises, but minutes of a Cabinet Eastern Committee meeting held on 5 December 1918 confirmed that Palestine had been part of the area that had been pledged to Hussein in 1915.

In 1916, Britain and France signed the Sykes–Picot Agreement, which divided the colonies of the Ottoman Empire between them. Under this agreement, the region of Palestine would be controlled by Britain. In a 1917 letter from Arthur James Balfour to Lord Rothschild, known as the Balfour Declaration, the British government "view[ed] with favour the establishment in Palestine of a national home for the Jewish people", but at the same time required "that nothing shall be done which may prejudice the civil and religious rights of existing non-Jewish communities in Palestine".

In 1922, the League of Nations granted Britain a mandate for Palestine. Like all League of Nations Mandates, this mandate derived from article 22 of the League of Nations Covenant, which called for the self-determination of former Ottoman Empire colonies after a transitory period administered by a world power. The Palestine Mandate recognized the Balfour Declaration and required that the mandatory government "facilitate Jewish immigration" while at the same time "ensuring that the rights and position of other sections of the population are not prejudiced".

Resentment over Zionist plans led to an outbreak of Arab-Jewish violence in the Palestine Riots of 1920. Violence erupted again the following year during the Jaffa Riots. In response to these riots, Britain established the Haycraft Commission of Inquiry. The British Mandatory authorities put forward proposals for setting up an elected legislative council in Palestine. In 1924, the issue was raised at a conference held by Ahdut Ha'avodah at Ein Harod. Shlomo Kaplansky, a veteran leader of Poalei Zion, argued that a Parliament, even with an Arab majority, was the way forward. David Ben-Gurion, the emerging leader of the Yishuv, succeeded in getting Kaplansky's ideas rejected. Violence erupted again in the form of the 1929 Palestine riots. After the violence, the British led another commission of inquiry under Sir Walter Shaw. The report of the Shaw Commission, known as the Shaw Report or Command Paper No 3530, attributed the violence to "the twofold fear of the Arabs that, by Jewish immigration and land purchase, they might be deprived of their livelihood and, in time, pass under the political domination of the Jews".

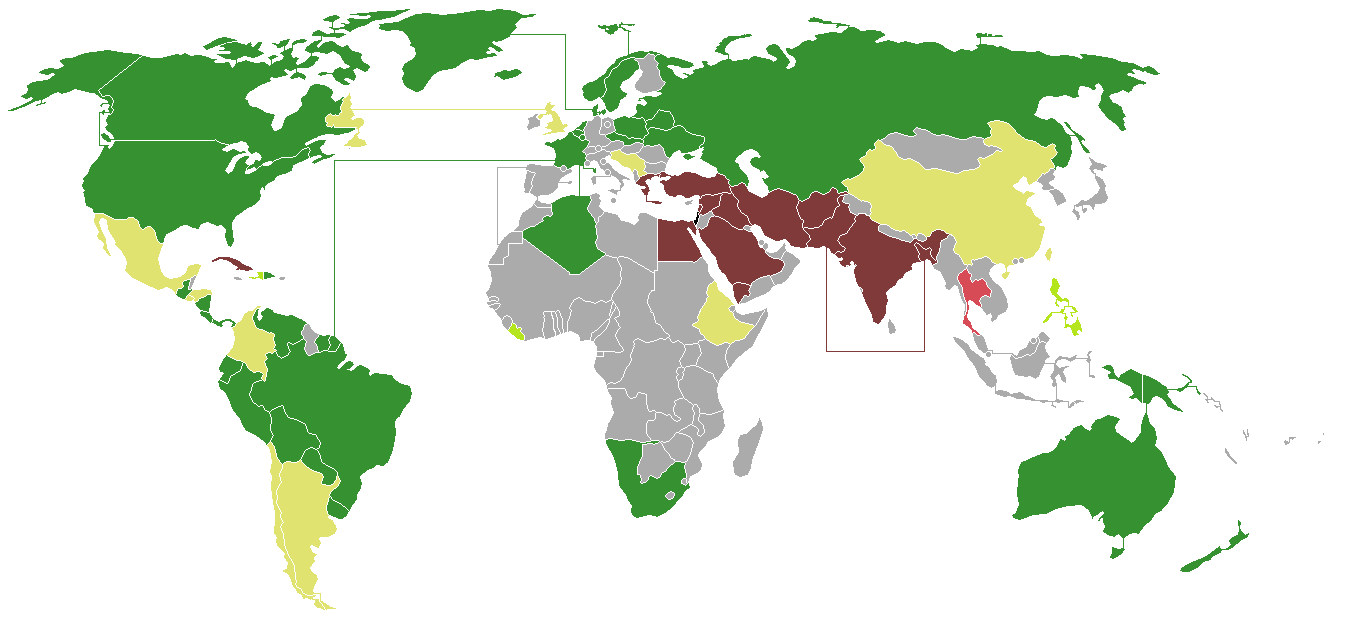
How UN members voted on the partition of Mandatory Palestine in 1947 In favour Abstained Against Absent

Violence erupted again during the 1936–39 Arab revolt in Palestine. The British established the Peel Commission, which recommended the partition of Palestine. While the Jewish community largely supported the concept of partition, the Arab community entirely rejected the Peel Partition Plan. The partition plan was abandoned, and Britain issued its White Paper of 1939, which sought to accommodate Arab demands regarding Jewish immigration by placing a quota of 10,000 Jewish immigrants per year over a five-year period from 1939 to 1944. It also required Arab consent for further Jewish immigration. The Jewish community saw the White Paper as a revocation of the Balfour Declaration, and due to Jewish persecution in the Holocaust, Jews continued to immigrate illegally in what has become known as Aliyah Bet.

Continued violence and the high cost of World War II prompted Britain to turn over the issue of Palestine to the United Nations in 1947. In its debates, the UN divided its member States into two subcommittees: one to address options for partition and a second to address all other options. The Second Subcommittee, which included all the Arab and Muslim States members, issued a long report arguing that partition was illegal according to the terms of the Mandate and proposing a unitary democratic state that would protect the rights of all citizens equally. The General Assembly instead voted for partition and in UN General Assembly Resolution 181 recommended that the Mandate territory of Palestine be partitioned into a Jewish state and an Arab state. The Jewish community accepted the 1947 partition plan and declared independence as the State of Israel in 1948. The Arab community rejected the partition plan, and army units from five Arab countries – Lebanon, Syria, Iraq, Transjordan, and Egypt – contributed to a united Arab army that attempted to invade the territory, resulting in the 1948 Arab–Israeli War.

=== Establishment of Israel ===
The 1948 Arab–Israeli War resulted in Israel's establishment as well as the flight or expulsion of over 700,000 Palestinians from the territory that became Israel. During the following years, a large population of Jews living in Arab nations (close to 800,000) left or were expelled from their homes in what has become known as the Modern Jewish Exodus and subsequently resettled in the new State of Israel.

By 1948, in the wake of the Holocaust, Jewish support for partition and a Jewish state had become overwhelming. Nevertheless, some Jewish voices still argued for unification. The International Jewish Labor Bund was against the UN vote on the partition of Palestine and reaffirmed its support for a single binational state that would guarantee equal national rights for Jews and Arabs and would be under the control of superpowers and the UN. The 1948 New York Second World Conference of the International Jewish Labor Bund condemned the proclamation of the Jewish state, because the decision exposed the Jews in Palestine to danger. The conference was in favour of a binational state built on the basis of national equality and democratic federalism.

A one-state, one-nation solution where Arabic-speaking Palestinians would adopt a Hebrew-speaking Israeli identity (although not necessarily the Jewish religion) was advocated within Israel by the Canaanite movement of the 1940s and 1950s, as well as more recently in the Engagement Movement led by Tsvi Misinai.

=== Palestinian views on a binational state ===
Prior to the 1960s, no solution to the conflict in which Arabs and Jews would share a binational state was accepted among Palestinians. The only viable solution from the Palestinian point of view would be an Arab state in which European immigrants would have second-class status. The Palestinian position evolved following Israel's victory in the Six-Day War, when it became no longer realistic to expect the militarily powerful and densely populated Jewish state to disappear. Eventually, the Palestinian leadership committed to the idea of a two-state solution. But according to a poll taken by the Palestine Center for Public Opinion in 2020, around 10% of Palestinians in the West Bank and Gaza believe that working towards a binational state should be a top priority. A joint poll conducted by the Palestinian Center for Policy and Survey Research and Tel Aviv University in July 2024 found 25% of Palestinians support "a single democratic state with equal rights for all", compared to 14% of Israeli Jews.

== Debate since 2009 ==
Some Israeli government spokespeople have proposed that Palestinian-majority areas of Israel, such as the area around Umm el-Fahm, be annexed to the new Palestinian state. As this measure would cut these areas off permanently from the rest of Israel's territory, including the coastal cities and other Palestinian towns and villages, Palestinians view this with alarm. Many Palestinian citizens of Israel would therefore prefer a one-state solution because this would allow them to sustain their Israeli citizenship.

Some Israeli Jews and Palestinians who oppose a one-state solution have nevertheless come to believe that it may come to pass. Israeli Prime Minister Olmert argued, in a 2007 interview with the Israeli daily Ha'aretz, that without a two-state agreement Israel would face "a South African-style struggle for equal voting rights" in which case "Israel [would be] finished". This echoes comments made in 2004 by Palestinian Prime Minister Ahmed Qurei, who said that if Israel failed to conclude an agreement with the Palestinians, that the Palestinians would pursue a single, bi-national state. In November 2009, Palestinian negotiator Saeb Erekat said that if Israel did not halt settlement construction, one alternative left for Palestinians would be to "refocus their attention on the one-state solution where Muslims, Christians and Jews can live as equals. ... It is very serious. This is the moment of truth for us."

In 2013, professor Ian Lustick, who had worked in the State Department, wrote in The New York Times that the "fantasy" of a two-state negotiation based on little more than a slogan ("two states for two peoples") prevented people from taking action toward something that might work. Lustick argued that people who assume Israel will persist as a Zionist project should consider how quickly the Soviet, Pahlavi Iranian, apartheid South African, Baathist Iraqi and Yugoslavian states unraveled. Lustick concludes that while two real states may one day arise or one state may be the route to eventual Palestinian independence, either would have to arise organically and not without "painful stalemates that lead each party to conclude that time is not on their side."

Support for a one-state solution is increasing as Palestinians, frustrated by lack of progress in negotiations aiming to establish the two-state solution, increasingly see the one-state solution as an alternative way forward. In 2016, then-U.S. Vice President Joe Biden said that due to expanding settlements, an eventual "one-state reality" was the most likely outcome.

In a 2021 survey of experts on the Middle East, 59 percent described the current situation as "a one-state reality akin to apartheid" and an additional 7 percent "one-state reality with inequality, but not akin to apartheid". If a two-state solution is not achieved, 77 percent predict "a one-state reality akin to apartheid" and 17 percent "one-state reality with increasing inequality, but not akin to apartheid"; just 1 percent think a binational state with equal rights for all inhabitants is likely. 52 percent say that the two-state solution is no longer possible.

New York City Mayor Zohran Mamdani has said that Israel should exist as a state with "equal rights for all", whether as part of a one-state or two-state solution.

== Arguments ==
=== In favor ===
Today, the proponents for the one-state solution include Palestinian author Ali Abunimah, Palestinian writer and political scientist Abdalhadi Alijla, Palestinian-American producer Jamal Dajani, Palestinian lawyer Michael Tarazi, American-Israeli anthropologist Jeff Halper, Israeli writer Dan Gavron, Lebanese-American academic Saree Makdisi, and Israeli journalist Gideon Levy. In an op-ed for The New York Times in 2004, Tarazi opined that the expansion of the Israeli settler movement, especially in the West Bank, was a rationale for bi-nationalism and the increased infeasibility of the two-state alternative:

"Support for one state is hardly a radical idea; it is simply the recognition of the uncomfortable reality that Israel and the occupied Palestinian territories already function as a single state. They share the same aquifers, the same highway network, the same electricity grid and the same international borders... The one-state solution... neither destroys the Jewish character of the Holy Land nor negates the Jewish historical and religious attachment (although it would destroy the superior status of Jews in that state). Rather, it affirms that the Holy Land has an equal Christian and Muslim character. For those who believe in equality, this is a good thing."

The Arab Center for Applied Social Research in Haifa convened an assembly of Israeli Arab citizens who pushed for a secular and democratic state while still maintaining a Jewish presence and culture in the region. Their proposal — a unitary democratic state in Israel with no preference for Jewish immigration, while allowing a Palestinian right of return — would eventually negate Jewish control in Israel.

Hamas has at times ruled out a two-state solution, and at other times endorsed the possibility of a two-state solution. Hamas co-founder Mahmoud Al-Zahar has been cited saying he "did not rule out the possibility of having Jews, Muslims and Christians living under the sovereignty of an Islamic state." The Palestinian Islamic Jihad, for its part, rejects a two-state solution; its leader Khalid al-Batsh stated that "The idea cannot be accepted and we believe that the entire Palestine is Arab and Islamic land and belongs to the Palestinian nation."

In 2003, Libyan leader Muammar al-Gaddafi proposed a one-state solution known as the Isratine proposal. Iranian supreme leader Ali Khamenei and former president Ebrahim Raisi both expressed their support for a one-state solution, in which Palestine would become the sole legitimate government of Israel.

John Mearsheimer of the University of Chicago argues that continued settlement expansion has made a two-state solution unlikely, leading toward a de facto binational state. He contends that U.S. policy regarding Israeli settlements has contributed to this outcome and could create long-term demographic and political challenges for Israel.

==== The left ====
In general, before and during World War II leftists were anti-fascist, sympathetic to Jews as victims of Nazi oppression, and supportive of a Jewish homeland in Palestine. With fascism defeated, that attitude changed during the 1960s, especially after the Six-Day War in 1967 and the domestic disappointments of 1968. Shifting their focus from anti-fascism to anti-imperialism, leftists looked for anti-imperialist revolutionary movements to support. In that context, Israelis, by then the stronger party, were increasingly seen as colonists and Palestinians as the colonized. Given their ideological commitment to equality and universal human rights, most leftists favored a unitary democratic state, overlooking or minimizing the difficulties of reconciling two competing national movements.

Since 1999, interest has been renewed in bi-nationalism or a unitary democratic state. That year, Palestinian activist Edward Said wrote, "[A]fter 50 years of Israeli history, classic Zionism has provided no solution to the Palestinian presence. I therefore see no other way than to begin now to speak about sharing the land that has thrust us together, sharing it in a truly democratic way with equal rights for all citizens."

In October 2003, New York University scholar Tony Judt broke ground in his article, "Israel: The Alternative" in the New York Review of Books, in which he argued that Israel is an "anachronism" in sustaining an ethnic identity for the state and that the two-state solution is fundamentally doomed and unworkable. The Judt article engendered considerable debate in the UK and the US, and The New York Review of Books received more than 1,000 letters per week about the essay. A month later, political scientist Virginia Tilley published "The One-State Solution" in the London Review of Books (followed by a book with the same title in 2005), arguing that West Bank settlements had made a two-state solution impossible and that the international community must accept a one-state solution as the de facto reality. Both have recognized that a unitary, democratic state is presently a utopian project that would require a vast transformation of both Israeli and Palestinian attitudes to have any chance of success.

Leftist journalists from Israel, such as Haim Hanegbi and Daniel Gavron, have called for the public to "face the facts" and accept the binational solution. On the Palestinian side, the Boycott, Divestment and Sanctions movement, along with their U.S. supporters — Jewish Voice for Peace and Students for Justice in Palestine — essentially support a unitary, democratic, Palestinian-majority state since they insist on a Palestinian right of return to Israel and full equality for Palestinians.

==== The Israeli right ====
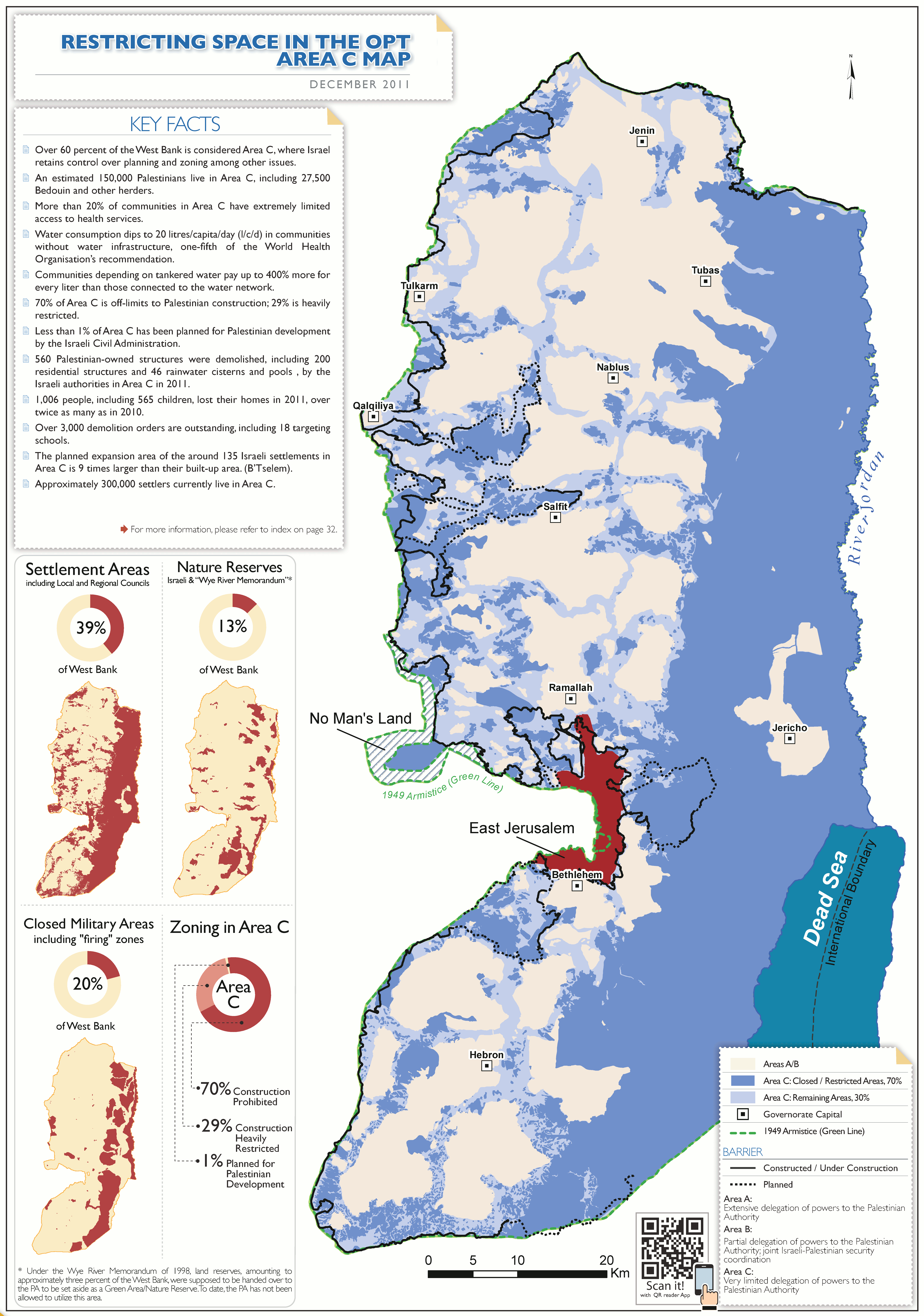
Area C of the West Bank, controlled by Israel, in blue and red, December 2011

In recent years, some politicians and political commentators on the right have advocated for annexing the West Bank and extending Israeli citizenship to its Palestinian residents while maintaining Israel's identity as a Jewish state with recognized minority rights. These proposals typically exclude the Gaza Strip, due to its large and generally hostile Palestinian population and its lack of any Israeli settlements or permanent military presence. Prominent political figures who have supported some form of a one-state solution include former defense minister Moshe Arens, former President Reuven Rivlin and Uri Ariel.

Likud MK Tzipi Hotovely has argued that Jordan was originally intended as the Arab state in the British Mandate of Palestine and has called for Israel to annex the West Bank as part of the historic Land of Israel. Naftali Bennett, later Prime Minister and a figure in many Likud-led coalitions, has proposed annexing Area C of the West Bank, which comprises about 60% of the West Bank land and is currently under Israeli control as per the Oslo Accords.

Debates over the feasibility of annexation have often included discussions about Palestinian demographics. According to a Begin–Sadat Center for Strategic Studies (BESA) study, the 2004 Palestinian population of the West Bank and Gaza stood at 2.5 million and not the 3.8 million claimed by the Palestinians. Some commentators, including journalist Caroline Glick in her 2014 book The Israeli Solution, have questioned the accuracy of population figures provided by the Palestinian Central Bureau of Statistics (PCBS). Glick argued that earlier surveys overestimated the Palestinian population by including people living abroad, double-counting Jerusalem residents, and projecting birthrates and immigration that did not materialize. Based on this critique, Glick contended that annexation would not significantly alter Israel's Jewish majority and could provide a framework for protecting minority rights under a single political system rooted in Jewish values. However, the demographic data from the PCBS are generally supported by Israeli demographers backed by Arnon Soffer and align closely with official Israeli estimates. In 2015, Sergio DellaPergola reported 5,698,500 Arabs living in Israel and the Palestinian territories, compared to a core Jewish population of 6,103,200.

=== Against ===
Critics argue that it would eventually make Israeli Jews an ethnic minority in the territory of Israel, currently a Jewish State legally defined as a "nation-state of the Jewish people". The high total fertility rate among Palestinians accompanied by a return of Palestinian refugees, would quickly render Jews a minority, according to Sergio DellaPergola, an Israeli demographer and statistician.

Critics have also argued that Jews, like any other nation, have the right to self-determination, and that due to still existing antisemitism, there is a need for a Jewish national home.

The Reut Institute expands on these concerns of many Israeli Jews and says that a one-state scenario without any institutional safeguards would negate Israel's status as a homeland for the Jewish people. When proposed as a political solution by non-Israelis, the assumption is that the idea is probably being put forward by those who are politically motivated to harm Israel and, by extension, Israeli Jews. They argue that the absorption of millions of Palestinians, along with a right of return for Palestinian refugees, and the generally high birthrate among Palestinians would quickly render Jews an ethnic minority and eliminate their rights to self-determination.

Israeli historian and politician Shlomo Ben-Ami, who served as Foreign Minister of Israel, dismissed the one-state solution as "ivory tower nonsense" and said that it creates a "South Africa situation without a South Africa solution."

In an interview with Jeffrey Goldberg, Hussein Ibish claimed that it is not realistic for Israel to be compelled to accept a binational solution with full right of return for refugees through international pressure or sanctions. According to Ibish, if a one state solution was to happen, it would come as a result of the status quo continuing, and the result would be a protracted civil war, with each intifada more violent than the last, and the conflict growing more and more religious in nature. Ibish speculated that in such a scenario, it could even go beyond an ethno-national war between Israelis and Palestinians into a religious war between Jews and Muslims, with Israeli Jews ending up under siege and relying on their nuclear weapons for protection.

==== Academia ====
Israeli Historian Benny Morris has argued that the one-state solution is not viable because of Arab unwillingness to accept a Jewish national presence in the Middle East. Morris argues any such state would be an authoritarian, fundamentalist state with a persecuted Jewish minority, citing the racism and persecution minorities face throughout the Arab and Muslim world, and writing that "Western liberals [...] refuse to recognize that peoples, for good historical, cultural, and social reasons are different and behave differently in similar or identical sets of circumstances." He notes the differences between Israeli Jewish society, which remains largely Westernized and secular, and Palestinian society, which according to Morris is increasingly Islamic and fundamentalist. He pointed to Hamas' 2007 takeover of Gaza, during which Fatah prisoners were shot in the knees and thrown off buildings, and the regular honor killings of women that permeate Palestinian and Israeli-Arab society, as evidence that Palestinian Muslims have no respect for Western values. He thus claimed that "the mindset and basic values of Israeli Jewish society and Palestinian Muslim society are so different and mutually exclusive as to render a vision of binational statehood tenable only in the most disconnected and unrealistic of minds."

According to Morris, the goal of a "secular democratic Palestine" was invented to appeal to Westerners, and while a few supporters of the one-state solution may honestly believe in such an outcome, the realities of Palestinian society mean that "the phrase objectively serves merely as camouflage for the goal of a Muslim Arab–dominated polity to replace Israel." Morris argued that should a binational state ever emerge, many Israeli Jews would likely emigrate to escape the "stifling darkness, intolerance, authoritarianism, and insularity of the Arab world and its treatment of minority populations", with only those incapable of finding new host countries to resettle in and Ultra-Orthodox Jews remaining behind.

Some argue that Jews would face the threat of genocide. Writing on Arutz Sheva, Steven Plaut referred to the one-state solution as the "Rwanda Solution", and wrote that the implementation of a one-state solution in which a Palestinian majority would rule over a Jewish minority would eventually lead to a "new Holocaust". Morris argued that while the Palestinians would have few moral inhibitions over the destruction of Israeli-Jewish society through mass murder or expulsion, fear of international intervention would probably stymie such an outcome.

Some critics argue that unification cannot happen without damaging or destroying Israel's democracy. The vast majority of Israeli Jews as well as Israeli Druze, some Israeli Bedouin, many Israeli Christian Arabs and even some non-Bedouin Israeli Muslim Arabs fear the consequences of amalgamation with the mostly Muslim Palestinian population in the occupied territories, which they perceive as more religious and conservative. (All Israeli Druze men and small numbers of Bedouin men serve in the Israel Defense Forces and there are sometimes rifts between these groups and Palestinians). One poll found that, in a future Palestinian state, 23% of Palestinians want civil law only, 35% want both Islamic and civil law, and 38% want Islamic law only. This negative view of Palestinians in the West Bank and Gaza prompts some critics to argue that the existing level of rights and equality for all Israeli citizens would be put in jeopardy with unification. Benny Morris echoes these claims, arguing that Palestinian Muslims, who would become the ruling majority in any such state, are deeply religious and do not have any tradition of democratic governance.

In response to the common argument given by proponents of the one state solution that Israel's settlements have become so entrenched in the West Bank that a Palestinian state is effectively impossible, scholars such as Norman Finkelstein and Noam Chomsky have countered that it is far more unrealistic to expect Israel to accept a one-state solution that would spell the end of Zionism than it is to expect it to dismantle some settlements. Nathan Thrall has argued that Israel could implement a unilateral withdrawal at any time of its choosing and that the facts on the ground suggest that a single state is a remote possibility, writing that:

Israelis and Palestinians are now farther from a single state than they have been at any time since the occupation began in 1967. Walls and fences separate Israel from Gaza and more than 90% of the West Bank. Palestinians have a quasi-state in the occupied territories, with its own parliament, courts, intelligence services and foreign ministry. Israelis no longer shop in Nablus and Gaza the way they did before the Oslo accords. Palestinians no longer travel freely to Tel Aviv. And the supposed reason that partition is often claimed to be impossible – the difficulty of a probable relocation of more than 150,000 settlers – is grossly overstated: in the 1990s, Israel absorbed several times as many Russian immigrants, many of them far more difficult to integrate than settlers, who already have Israeli jobs, fully formed networks of family support and a command of Hebrew.

Shaul Arieli has argued that the settlement enterprise has failed to create the appropriate conditions to prevent a contiguous Palestinian state or to implement the annexation of the West Bank. He has noted that the settlers comprise only 13.5% of the West Bank's population and occupy 4% of its land, and that the settlement enterprise has failed to build up a viable local economic infrastructure. He noted that only about 400 settler households were engaged in agriculture, with the amount of settler-owned farmland comprising only 1.5% of the West Bank. In addition, he wrote that there are only two significant industrial zones in the West Bank settlements, with the vast majority of workers there Palestinian, and that the vast majority of settlers live near the border, in areas that can be annexed by Israel with relative ease in territorial exchanges, while still allowing for the formation of a viable Palestinian state. According to Arieli, 62% of the settler workforce commutes over the Green Line into Israel proper for work while another 25% works in the heavily subsidized education system of the settlements, with only a small percent working in agriculture and industry. About half of the settlements have populations fewer than 1,000 and only 15 have populations greater than 5,000. He also believes the settlement movement has failed to create facts on the ground precluding an Israeli withdrawal, and it is possible to implement a land exchange that would see about 80% of the settlers stay in place, necessitating the evacuation of only about 30,000 settler households, in order to establish a viable and contiguous Palestinian state in the West Bank.

This sentiment has been echoed by Shany Mor, who argued that in 2020, the geographical distribution of settlers in the West Bank had not materially changed since 1993, and that a two-state solution is actually more feasible now than it was in the past due to the disentanglement of the Israeli and Palestinian economies in the 1990s. According to Mor, nearly all the population growth in the settlements between 2005 and 2020 was concentrated in the Haredi settlements of Beitar Illit and Modi'in Illit, due to their high birth rates.

==== Journalists ====
One major argument against the one-state solution is that it would endanger the safety of the Jewish minority, because it would require assimilation with what critics fear would be an extremely hostile Muslim ruling majority. In particular, Jeffrey Goldberg points to a 2000 Haaretz interview with Edward Said, whom he describes as "one of the intellectual fathers of one-statism". When asked whether he thought a Jewish minority would be treated fairly in a binational state, Said replied that "it worries me a great deal. The question of what is going to be the fate of the Jews is very difficult for me. I really don't know."

Imagining what might ensue with unification, some critics of the one-state model believe that rather than ending the Arab–Israeli conflict, it would result in large-scale ethnic violence and possibly civil war, pointing to violence during the British Mandate period, such as in 1920, 1921, 1929, and 1936–39 as examples. In this view, violence between Palestinian Arabs and Israeli Jews is inevitable and can only be forestalled by partition. These critics also cite the 1937 Peel Commission, which recommended partition as the only means of ending the conflict. Critics also cite bi-national arrangements in Yugoslavia, Lebanon, Bosnia, Cyprus, and Pakistan, which failed and resulted in further internal conflicts. Similar criticisms appear in The Case for Peace.

Left-wing Israeli journalist Amos Elon argued that while Israel's settlement policy was pushing things in the direction of a one-state solution, should it ever come to pass, "the end result is more likely to resemble Zimbabwe than post-apartheid South Africa". Echoing these sentiments, Palestinian-American journalist Ray Hanania wrote that the idea of a single state where Jews, Muslims, and Christians can live side by side is "fundamentally flawed." In addition to the fact that Israel would not support it, Hanania noted that the Arab and Muslim world don't practice it, writing "Exactly where do Jews and Christians live in the Islamic World today side-by-side with equality? We don't even live side-by-side with equality in the Palestinian Diaspora."

Writing in Haaretz, Nehemia Shtrasler wrote that a single state would not function properly because the Jewish and Arab inhabitants would ultimately be more loyal to their respective communities than to the state, which would be an artificial construct attempting to unite two communities with their own national consciousness. He wrote that such a state would likely be racked by terrorism and civil war.

On the aftermath of any hypothetical implementation of a one-state solution, Gershom Gorenberg wrote: "Palestinians will demand the return of property lost in 1948 and perhaps the rebuilding of destroyed villages. Except for the drawing of borders, virtually every question that bedevils Israeli–Palestinian peace negotiations will become a domestic problem setting the new political entity aflame.... Two nationalities who have desperately sought a political frame for cultural and social independence would wrestle over control of language, art, street names, and schools." Gorenberg wrote that in the best case, the new state would be paralyzed by endless arguments, and in the worst case, constant disagreements would erupt into violence.

Gorenberg wrote that in addition to many of the problems with the one-state solution described above, the hypothetical state would collapse economically, as the Israeli Jewish intelligentsia would in all likelihood emigrate, writing that "financing development in majority-Palestinian areas and bringing Palestinians into Israel's social welfare network would require Jews to pay higher taxes or receive fewer services. But the engine of the Israeli economy is high-tech, an entirely portable industry. Both individuals and companies will leave." As a result, the new binational state would be financially crippled.

== Public opinion ==
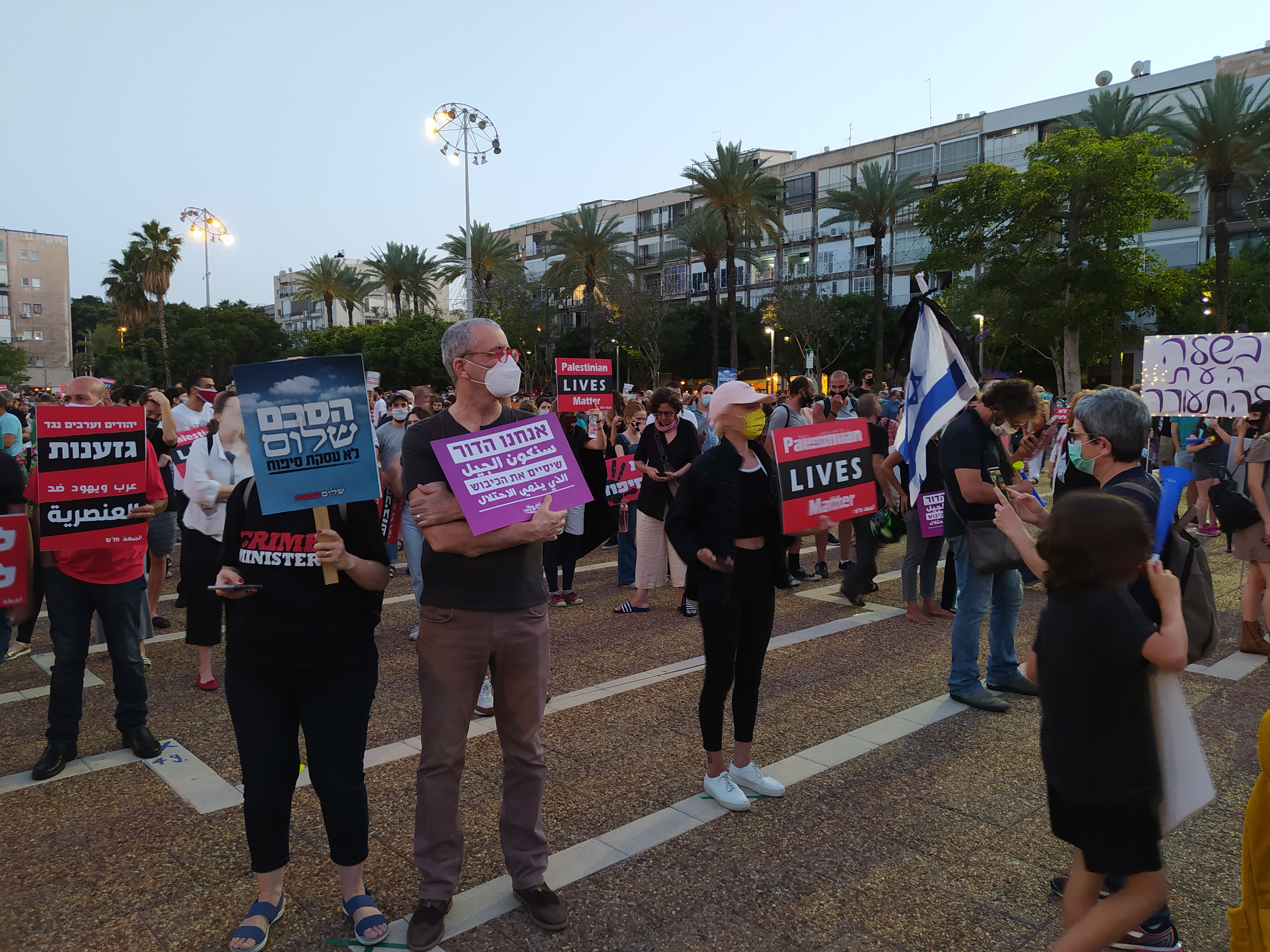
Demonstration against Israeli annexation of the West Bank, Rabin Square, Tel Aviv-Yafo, June 6, 2020

=== Since 2014 ===
An August 2026 Palestinian Center for Policy and Survey Research (PCPSR) poll found that 10% of Palestinians supported a single state with equal rights for all, 56% a two-state solution based on the pre-1967 borders (52% in the West Bank and 61% in Gaza), and 14% a confederation of two states.

A July 2024 joint poll conducted by the PCPSR and Tel Aviv University found that 25% of Palestinians and 14% of Jewish Israelis supported a single democratic state with equal rights for all, while 40% of Palestinians and 21% Jewish Israelis that supported a two-state solution. 33% of Palestinians supported a single Palestinian state with limited rights for Jews, and 42% Jewish Israelis supported Israeli annexation of the West Bank without equal rights for Palestinians.

According to a 2020 poll taken by the Palestine Center for Public Opinion, around 10% of Palestinians in the West Bank and Gaza believe that working towards a binational state should be a top priority.

A December 2016 point by the PCPSR and Tel Aviv University found that 36% of Palestinians, 19% of Jewish Israelis and 56% of Arab Israelis supported a one-state solution with equal rights, while 44% of Palestinians, 50% of Jewish Israelis and 82% of Arab Israelis supported a two-state solution without specific details of an agreement.

=== Before 2014 ===
A multi-option poll by Near East Consulting (NEC) in November 2007 found the bi-national state to be less popular than either "two states for two people" or "a Palestinian state on all historic Palestine" with only 13.4% of respondents supporting a binational solution. In February 2007, NEC found that around 70% of Palestinian respondents backed the idea when given a straight choice of either supporting or opposing "a one-state solution in historic Palestine where Muslims, Christians and Jews have equal rights and responsibilities".

A poll conducted in March 2010 by Israel Democracy Institute suggested that 15% of right-wing Jewish Israelis and 16% of left-wing Jewish Israelis support a binational state solution over a two states solution based on 1967 lines. According to the same poll, 66% of Jewish Israelis preferred the two-state solution.

In March 2010, a survey by the Palestinian Center for Policy and Survey Research and the Harry S. Truman Research Institute for the Advancement of Peace at the Hebrew University of Jerusalem found that Palestinian support had risen to 29 percent.

In April 2010, a poll by the Jerusalem Media and Communication Centre also found that Palestinian support for a "bi-national" solution had jumped from 20.6 percent in June 2009 to 33.8 percent. If this support for a bi-national state is combined with the finding that 9.8 percent of Palestinian respondents favour a "Palestinian state" in "all of historic Palestine", this poll suggested about equal Palestinian support for a two-state and one-state solution in mid-2010.

In 2011, a poll by Stanley Greenberg and the Palestinian Center for Public Opinion and sponsored by the Israel Project revealed that 61% of Palestinians reject a two state solution, while 34% said they accepted it. 66% said the Palestinians' real goal should be to start with a two-state solution but then move to it all being one Palestinian state.

== One-state reality ==
In a 2021 survey of 557 scholars of and experts on the Middle East, 57% of respondents held the view that a two-state solution was "no longer possible", and 65% described the current situation as "a one-state reality akin to apartheid." When asked: "If a two-state outcome is, or becomes, no longer possible, which of the following is most likely in Israel, the West Bank, and Gaza in the next ten years?", 80% gave the same answer.

Rashid Khalidi argued in 2011 that Israel and the Palestinian territories already functioned as a single state exercising control over populations with unequal legal status. He attributed the failure of the peace process to continued Israeli settlement expansion and expressed skepticism about the feasibility of a two-state solution.

In 2023, political scientists Michael Barnett, Nathan J. Brown, and Shibley Telhami wrote: "Between the Mediterranean Sea and the Jordan River, there is one state that controls the entry and exit of people and goods, oversees security, and has the capacity to impose its decisions, laws, and policies." Evidence of this control includes incidents such as the Israeli military raiding Palestinian civil society and human rights organizations in August of 2022, forcing them to shut down, and in December of 2025 when Canadian members of Parliament were denied access to the West Bank by Israeli authorities. Despite the presence of the Palestinian Authority, Israel retains significant influence over economic, infrastructural, and security conditions in major West Bank cities, including Ramallah.

In 2025, analyst Mairav Zonszein wrote, "The map Israelis see on nightly weather forecasts and the one used in most classrooms shows what is known as Greater Israel, an area of land that stretches from the Mediterranean Sea to the Jordan River. On it, there is no demarcation of the pre-1967 borders, known as the Green Line, between Israel and the Palestinian territories." This is also true of official maps, including those used by Prime Minister Benjamin Netanyahu. Netanyahu stated his intention to retain Israeli control over the West Bank, officially referred to in Israel as Judea and Samaria, "forever", and celebrates settlements established since the 1967 Six-Day War.

== See also ==
- United Nations Partition Plan for Palestine (1947)
- List of Middle East peace proposals
  - Two-state solution
  - Three-state solution
  - A Land for All (Two-State Confederation)
- Jordanian option
  - Jordanian annexation of the West Bank (1950-1967/1988)
  - King Hussein's federation plan (1972)
  - Peres–Hussein London Agreement (1987)
- Allon Plan (1967)
- State of Palestine (declared 1988)
- State of Judea (declared 1988)
- Madrid Conference of 1991
- Oslo Accords (1993, 1995)
- Palestinian Authority (est. 1995)

General concepts

- From the river to the sea
- Halachic state
- Palestinianism
- Melting pot
- Multiculturalism
- Zionism

Personalities

- Ahad Ha'am (1856–1927)
- Mahmoud Ahmadinejad and Israel
- Hannah Arendt
- Gilad Atzmon
- Hugo Bergmann
- Martin Buber
- Tony Judt
- Ghada Karmi
- Judah Leon Magnes
- Virginia Tilley

Organisations

- Brit Shalom (political organization) (est. 1925), Jewish supporters of bi-national state
