= Marcel Khalife =

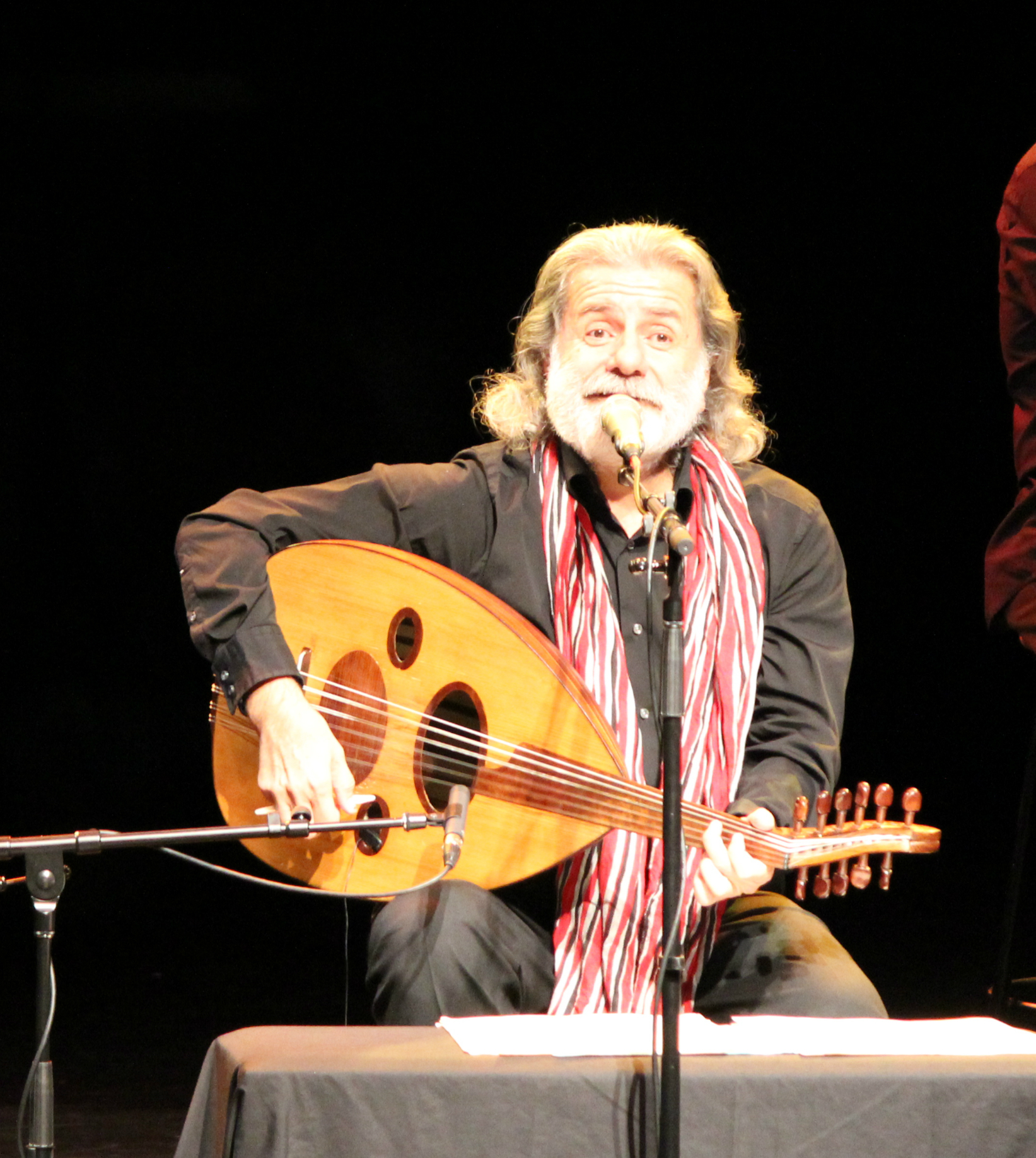
- Khalife in 2014

Background information
- Born: 10 June 1950 (age 76); Amsheet, Mount Lebanon Governorate, Lebanon
- Occupations: Singer-songwriter, oud player
- Years active: 1972–present

Marcel Khalife (Arabic: مرسيل خليفة; born 10 June 1950) is a Lebanese musical composer, singer, and oud player. Khalife is considered a folk hero in the Arab world, and he has been described as the "Bob Dylan of the Middle East."

== Biography ==
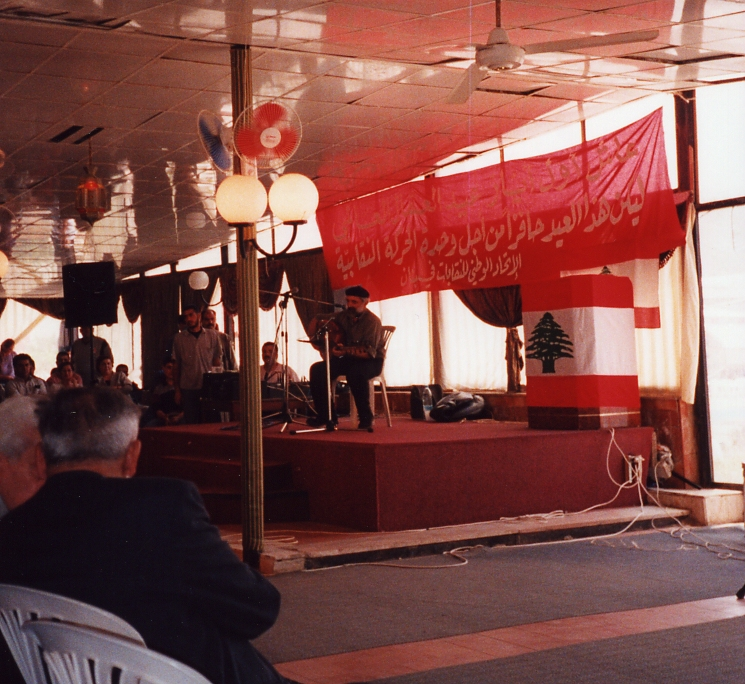
Khalife performing at May Day celebration in Beirut

In 1983, Paredon Records (later acquired by Smithsonian Folkways) released Promises of the Storm, a collection of protest songs and political ballads.

=== Tunisia ===
In July 2009, Khalife returned to Tunisia to perform at the Roman amphitheater to a full house, as part of the 45th International Festival of Carthage. Speaking to the audience, Khalife opened the concert by stating:

People of Tunisia, good evening. This night, like all nights in Tunisia, has a special taste. In spite of all the collapses and defeats around the world, Tunisians are still the kind of people who have a special taste and love. They do not broadcast my songs and concerts on TV, but I know that my public keeps on listening to me.

Khalife later dedicated a song to the "revolutionary leader Che Guevara".

=== Ana Yousef, ya Abi case ===
Three times (1996, 1999, and 2003), he faced criminal prosecution for his song I am Joseph, O Father, written by the Palestinian poet Mahmoud Darwish.

== Education ==
Khalifé studied the oud at the Beirut National Conservatory of Music and graduated in 1971.

== Professional life ==
After graduating from the Beirut National Conservatory of Music in 1971, Khalife taught oud at the conservatory until 1975. Between 1972 and 1975, he taught music at public universities and several private music institutions in Lebanon while at the same touring the MENA region, Europe, and the United States to perform.

He formed a musical group in Amchit in 1972 to revive his village's musical heritage, and it performed for the first time in Lebanon. He formed the Al Mayadine Ensemble in 1976, which toured Arabic-speaking countries, Europe, the United States, Canada, South America, Australia, and Japan. Khalife was awarded the American Folkloric Festival Award in 1975, the National Palestine Medal for Arts and Culture in 2001, the UNESCO Artist for Peace award in 2005, the Lebanese government Cedar Medal in 2005, and the Charles Cros Award for World Music in 2008. Khalife performed globally during his career, including throughout much of the Arab world. A long-time supporter of the Palestinian struggle for self-determination, he released the song, Nashid al-Intifada (“Anthem of the Intifada”) in 1989, amid the First Palestinian Intifada.

== Personal life ==
His eldest son, Juilliard School graduate Rami Khalife, is a pianist and composer. In October 2011, the Qatar Philharmonic Orchestra, under the conductorship of James Gaffigan, premiered Khalife's 'Chaos', for orchestra and piano, with Khalife at the helm as a soloist. In February 2013, Rami Khalife's Arab Spring-inspired 'Requiem' was premiered, within the same program as Marcel Khalife's suite "Oriental".

== Works ==
=== Books ===
In 1982, he wrote a six-part Anthology of Studying the Oud.

=== Performances ===
- 2005.11.14: Lincoln Theatre (Washington, D.C.) USA
- 2004.01.12: Kennedy Center Washington DC USA
- 2008.10.10: De Roma Borgerhout, Antwerp, Belgium
- 2011.03.13: Al-Bustan Concert Series, Philadelphia, PA, USA
- 2014.11.15: Al-Bustan Concert Series, Philadelphia, PA, USA
- 2016.12.18: Day for Night Festival, Houston, TX, USA
- 2018.05.25 Institut des cultures arabes et méditerranéennes, Geneva, Switzerland

=== Films ===
Khalife has composed soundtracks for films, documentaries, and fiction, produced by Maroun Baghdadi, Oussama Mohammed, Sophi Sayhf Eddin, and Samir Zikra. His music is also featured in the documentary Occupied Minds produced by Jamal Dajani and David Michaelis. His music featured in the documentary film Sons of Eilaboun by Hisham Zreiq.

=== Talks ===
Khalife gave a talk on 12 March 2013, at the American University of Sharjah about his latest CD, The Fall of the Moon, and his longing towards the late Mahmoud Darwish. He also spoke about the prospects of publishing his autobiography in two volumes.

== Discography ==
Below the discography of Khalife.

=== Studio albums ===
- Promises of the Storm (1976)
- At the Border (1980)
- Ahmad Al Arabi (1984)
- Dreamy Sunrise (1985)
- Ode to a Homeland (1990)
- Arabic Coffeepot (1995)
- Voyageur (1998)
- Jadal (2002)
- The Bridge (2002)
- Summer Night's Dream (2003)
- Promises of the Storm (2003)
- Caress (2004)
- Peace Be with You (2006)
- Taqasim (2006)
- Sharq (2007)
- Andulusia of Love (2016)

=== Singles ===
- Mounadiloun (Strugglers)
- Oummi (Mother)

=== Live albums ===
- Dance (1995)
- Marcel Khalife: Magic Carpet (1998)
- Concerto Al Andalus (2002)

== Honours ==
- France: Knight of the Ordre des Arts et des Lettres (2018)
- Morocco: Commander of the Order of Intellectual Merit (2008)
- Tunisia: Grand Officier of the National Order of Merit of Tunisia (2018)
