= Federal Zionism =

Establishment of a federal Jewish state

Federal Zionism or Zionist federalism is an appraisal of federalism within the context of Zionism whereby the state of Israel is re-conceived as a federal nation-state with sovereign divisions for, at least, both the Jewish-majority areas and the Arab/Palestinian-majority areas.

== History ==
Various different Zionist organizations have proposed a bi-national state in Palestine based upon a federal system of government. While the Cultural Zionists fell out of favor following the 1929 Hebron massacre, it still lingered on in various different organizations. In 1942, with the ongoing Aliyah Bet, taking in refugees and illegal immigrants fleeing the Holocaust, it became clear that a Jewish state's establishment was imminent. As a result, various Cultural Zionists, who had long favored binationalism, formed Ihud, Hebrew for "Unity," with American Reform rabbi Judah Leon Magnes writing the majority of the party platform. It sought the creation of "political parity" between Jews and Arabs by ensuring equal rights for both peoples and "numerical parity" by regulating Jewish immigration into Palestine. Alongside this, Magnes added to the platform that the region of Israel (which would have included the Jewish-majority regions of Palestine) would be part of a broader pan-Arab federation.

Currently, the Federation Movement in Israel represents a newer kind of Federal Zionism, calling for the creation of 30 cantons (19 majority-Jewish, 9 majority-Arab, 2 majority-Druze, and a pluralistic Greater Jerusalem canton) across the territory of Israel, the West Bank, and the Golan Heights, albeit not the Gaza Strip, which they seek to maintain as a "separate entity," adding a "Council of Cantons" alongside the Knesset, and creating a single constitution accepted by both Jews and Arabs.

== Binational structure ==
While it may be similar in concept to the one-state solution and Isratine proposal, Federal Zionism focuses upon the entrenchment of the Jewish character and self-determination of the Jewish-majority component in such a federalized situation instead of an expansion of the Jewish population to a wider geographic area.

Federal Zionism may also call for the granting of certain jurisdictional powers of autonomy to regions within the State of Israel's Jewish majority areas, akin to the pseudo-federal structure of the Twelve Tribes of the ancient Israelites. For instance, one solution would be the partition of larger districts, such as South District, for the purpose of increased regional self-governance and self-responsibility.

The implications of a federalized binational structure could also result in a further demarcation between religious and secular populations in both ethnocultural communities, particularly as a result of prior withdrawal and self-segregation of more orthodox sects of Judaism from non-Orthodox populations.

== Upper house ==
At the national level, the result would likely be the creation of an upper house of elected representatives of either the first-level subdivisions of Israel or of upper house-specific electoral districts in the Knesset, and the inclusion of Palestinian non-voting delegates to the lower house, similar to the relationship structure between the Commonwealths and federal government of the United States through non-voting delegates.

== See also ==
- Brit Shalom
- One-state solution
- Isratine proposal
