= Isratin =

Proposed solution to the Israel-Palestine conflict

Isratin or Isratine (Hebrew: ישרטין, Yisrātīn; Arabic: إسراطين, ʾIsrāṭīn), also known as the bi-national state (Hebrew: מדינה דו-לאומית, Medina Du-Le'umit), is a proposed unitary, federal or confederate Israeli-Palestinian state encompassing the present territory of Israel, the West Bank and the Gaza Strip. Depending on various points of view, such a scenario is presented as a desirable one-state solution resolving the Israeli–Palestinian conflict, or as a calamity in which Israel would ostensibly lose its character as a Jewish state and the Palestinians would fail to achieve their national independence within a two-state solution. Increasingly, Isratin is being discussed not as an intentional political solution – desired or undesired – but as the probable, inevitable outcome of the continuous growth of the Jewish settlements in the West Bank and the seemingly irrevocable entrenchment of the Israeli occupation there since 1967.

== Saif al-Islam Gaddafi Isratin proposal ==
The Gaddafi Isratin proposal intended to permanently resolve the Israeli–Palestinian conflict through a secular, federalist, republican one-state solution, which was first articulated by Saif al-Islam Gaddafi, the son of Muammar Gaddafi of Libya, at the Chatham House in London and later adopted by Muammar Gaddafi himself.

Its main points are:

- Creation of a binational Jewish-Palestinian state called the "Federal Republic of the Holy Land";
- Partition of the state into five administrative regions, with Jerusalem as a city-state;
- Return of all Palestinian refugees;
- Supervision by the United Nations of free and fair elections on the first and second occasions;
- Removal of weapons of mass destruction from the state;
- Recognition of the state by the Arab League.

Saif al-Islam Gaddafi's proposal was eventually incorporated in Libyan leader Muammar Gaddafi's book Arabic: إسراطين — الكتاب الأبيض, romanized: ʾIsrāṭīn — al-Kitāb al-ʾAbyaḍ, lit. 'Isratine — The White Book' released in the year 2000, which served as his official guide to address the Arab–Israeli conflict and how to solve it. Despite the suggestion of "Federal Republic of the Holy Land" as the name of this hypothetical new state, the name Isratin (Hebrew: יִשְׂרָטִין, Yisratin; Arabic: إسراطين, ʾIsrāṭīn), a portmanteau of the names "Israel" and "Falastin" ("Palestine" in Arabic and Hebrew) – variously spelled in English as "Isratine" or "Israteen" and sometimes rendered "Israstine" – has been used as a "working title" for the notion of a single state in Israel, the West Bank and Gaza Strip, with Palestinians and Jewish inhabitants of all three having citizenship and equal rights in the combined entity.

Muammar Gaddafi again championed the "Isratin proposal" in an op-ed article for the New York Times as the "only option" for a solution to the Israeli–Palestinian conflict. The timing of the article approximately coincided with the inauguration of Barack Obama as President of the U.S. and with the cease-fire that apparently marked the end of the Gaza War (2008–09). Gaddafi argued that this solution would avoid the partitioning of West Bank into Arab and Jewish zones, with buffer zones between them.

== Popular support ==
Map of Israel

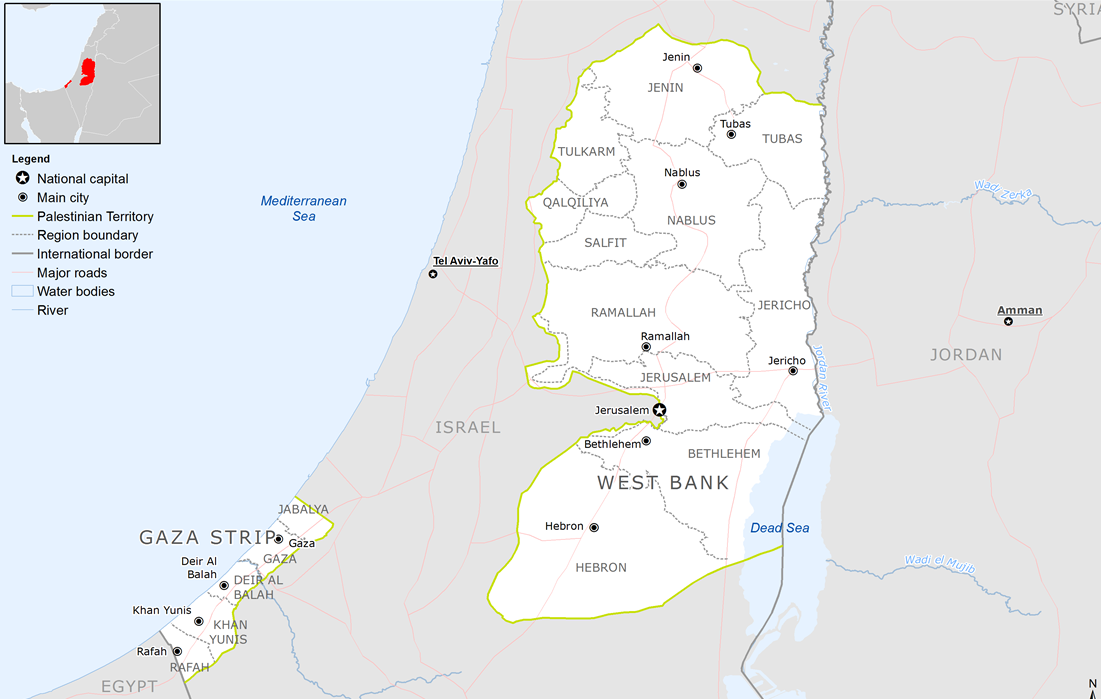
Map of Palestine

The belief of both proponents and detractors of the Isratin scenario is that a single state in Israel, the West Bank and Gaza Strip, would provide citizenship and equal rights in the combined entity for all its inhabitants, without regard to ethnicity or religion. It is precisely for such reason that such a scenario is regarded by the majority of Israelis and Palestinians as unthinkable. The Israeli political left-wing, both Jewish and Arab, argues that continuing Jewish West Bank settlement is creating a situation whereby Israel and the West Bank would become either an apartheid state with full civil rights for Israeli Jews and Israeli Arabs and limited autonomy for Palestinians – as currently practiced under the Palestinian Authority – or a bi-national state in which Zionist Israel would cease to exist as a homeland of the Jewish people. Similar arguments are raised by Palestinian leaders, who frequently warn Israelis and the international community that time is rapidly running out for the implementation of the two-state solution as the Jewish West Bank settlements continue to expand. Despite their diaspora-style support of the Palestinian cause, a large majority of Israeli Arabs fiercely oppose any political solution which would reduce their status as purely Israeli citizens, including any one-state solution which would effectively merge them with the West Bank Palestinians from which they have developed separately – both economically and politically – for over 70 years. Israeli Arabs are economically much better off than their Palestinian cousins.

In a positive sense, while some advocate Isratin as a one-state solution for ideological reasons, others feel that due to the reality on the ground, it is the only practicable solution.

A bi-national solution enjoys the support of about a quarter of the Palestinian electorate, according to polls conducted by the Jerusalem Media and Communications Center. A multi-option poll by Near East Consulting (NEC) in November 2007 found the bi-national state to be less popular than either "two states for two people" or "a Palestinian state on all historic Palestine". However, in February 2007 NEC found that around 70% of Palestinian respondents backed the idea when given a straight choice of either supporting or opposing "a one-state solution in historic Palestine where Muslims, Christians and Jews have equal rights and responsibilities".

Among Palestinians, opponents of the idea include Islamists, who argue that it would run contrary to the goal of an Islamic state and Pan-Islamism while some Arab nationalists, who criticize it for going against the idea of Pan-Arabism.

Israeli opponents argue that one state would erode the notion of Israel as a Jewish state. The main obstacle is the fact that demographic trends show the likelihood of a near-term majority Arab population west of the Jordan River (including the land within the internationally recognized borders of the state of Israel, the West Bank, and Gaza). The probability that Palestinians would constitute an electoral majority in a bi-national state is seen by many Israeli Jews as a threat to the very premise of Israel, explicitly created as a Jewish state in the aftermath of the Holocaust. A 2000 poll soon after the outbreak of the second intifada found 18% of Israeli Jews supported a binational solution.

== Modern background ==
Israel's capture of the West Bank from Jordan and the Gaza Strip from Egypt in the Six-Day War of 1967 recommenced the pre-1948 discourse concerning the one-state scenario, while at the same time giving the two-state solution arguably the only window of opportunity to become a reality.

Israel's victory over its neighbours was greeted by euphoria within Israel, but some critical Israeli and foreign observers quickly recognised the new territories could pose a major long-term problem, and a considerable debate followed about what to do next. One option was the one-state solution: to annex the newly acquired territories (extend Israeli law and sovereignty to the new territories) and give the Palestinians living in these territories Israeli citizenship, similar to the Israeli Arabs who were absorbed into Israel as a result of the 1948 war.

However, the vast majority of Israelis, left and right, including political parties supporting the West Bank settlement movement, feared that such a solution would significantly dilute Israel's Jewish majority. In the early 1980s, the pro-settlements Likud Prime Minister Menachem Begin, supported Palestinian autonomy under eventual Israeli sovereignty. The Labour Party supported territorial compromise with a Jordanian-Palestinian state under Hashemite rule.

The abject defeat of Arab armies in 1967 led to an initial rejectionist attitude in some Arab circles, most notably the Khartoum Resolution a few months after the war, which stated there would be “no peace, recognition of, or negotiations” with Israel. However, this position eased over time, ultimately leading to an almost dogmatic Palestinian acceptance of the notion of a two-state solution which persisted until the rise of Hamas in the 2000s. The outcome of the 1973 Yom Kippur War prompted a fundamental political rethink among the Palestinian leadership. It was realised that Israel's military strength and, crucially, its alliance with the United States made it unlikely that it could be defeated militarily. In December 1974, Yasser Arafat's Palestine Liberation Organization (PLO), then regarded as a terrorist group by the Israeli government, declared that a bi-national state was the only viable solution to the Israeli-Palestinian conflict. The change in policy was met with considerable confusion, as it was official PLO policy to replace Israel with a secular and democratic state with a full right of return for all displaced Palestinians, including the Jews who were living in Palestine before 1948. This would effectively have ended Israel's Jewish majority and, by secularising the state, would have weakened its exclusive Jewish character. In short, a bi-national state on the PLO's terms would mean a very different kind of Israel or no Israel at all. This prospect was always strongly opposed by all sides in Israeli politics.

But while the Arab side was re-adjusting its position, the two-state solution was dealt a heavy blow as Israel (in the 1980s) and subsequently the powerful, semi-autonomous settlement movement (in the 1990s and thereafter), implemented the controversial policy of Jewish settlements in the territories, establishing "facts on the ground" while keeping open the question of the Palestinians' long-term fate.

As early as 1973, the prospect of a bi-national state was being used by prominent figures on the Israel left to warn against holding on to the territories. For example, Histadrut Secretary General I. Ben-Aharon warned in a March 1973 article for The Jerusalem Post that Israel could not have any real control over a bi-national state and that Israelis should be satisfied with a state already containing a sizable Arab minority in Israel proper. With the advent of the Oslo peace process in the 1990s, the two-state solution appeared to be the sole option on the table, the general understanding being that its implementation would require evacuation of the non-contiguous and isolated Jewish settlements. The idea of resolving the original conflict by establishing a Palestinian state in the West Bank and Gaza Strip in return for peace, while retaining the large settlement blocs contiguous to pre-1967 Israel, seemed to present a modicum of fairness. Although the initial reaction of the Palestinians and of the neighboring Arab states was not encouraging, after 1993 diplomatic pressure from the United States, Russia, European countries, and the United Nations served to begin the process of almost institutionalizing the concept of the two-state solution as the only decent approach to the problem.

The two-state solution has become a virtual dogma in Israeli–Palestinian official discussions: it was the basis of the Madrid Conference (1991), the Oslo Accords (1993), the Interim agreement (1995), the Hebron Protocol (1997), the Wye River Memorandum (1998), and so-called "Road Map" (2002). However, these agreements are rejected by various factions on the Palestinian side, most notably Hamas, Palestinian Islamic Jihad and the Popular Front for the Liberation of Palestine. The Oslo Accords were never fully adopted and implemented by both sides. After the Second Intifada in 2000, many believe that the two-state solution is increasingly losing its feasibility.

On the Israeli side, Likud and Labour both opposed withdrawal to the pre-1967 borders or setting up a Palestinian state, and both supported building more Jewish settlements in the territories and maintaining exclusive Israeli control over Jerusalem. However, Labour argued for building strategic settlements only in areas Israel intended to keep, such as the Jordan Valley and the surroundings of East Jerusalem, while handing the rest back to Jordan, claiming that the alternative would result in a bi-national state and so "the end of the Zionist endeavour". Many on the left of Israeli politics were already warning that without a clean separation from the Palestinians, the outcome would be either a bi-national state by default (thus ending Israel's Jewish character) or a South African-style "Bantustan" with a Jewish minority forcibly ruling a disenfranchised Arab majority (thus ending Israel's claims to be a democracy).

Despite this, opposition to bi-nationalism was not absolute. Some of those on the Israel right associated with the settler movement were willing to contemplate a bi-national state as long as it was established on Zionist terms. Originally, members of Menachem Begin's Likud government in the late 1970s were willing to support the idea if it would ensure formal Israeli sovereignty in the West Bank and Gaza. Begin's chief of staff, Eliahu Ben-Elissar, told The Washington Post in November 1979 that "we can live with them and they can live with us. I would prefer they were Israeli citizens, but I am not afraid of a bi-national state. In any case, it will always be a Jewish state with a large Arab minority."

The construction of the Israeli West Bank barrier after 2003, strongly opposed by the ideological part of the West Bank Jewish settler movement, was widely deemed as an attempt to not only curtail Palestinian suicide bombings but also to define where a future international border might run and eventually extricate Israel from most of the West Bank. This impression was reinforced by the Israel's unilateral disengagement plan implemented by Prime Minister Ariel Sharon in the Gaza Strip and the northern West Bank in 2005, which was then widely regarded as the death knell of the trans-security barrier settlements. However, since such time, these settlements have continued to grow considerably, not as a result of Israeli government policy (which often opposed such growth) but rather as a result of the organizational and economic abilities of the powerful and highly motivated settlement movement. The majority of Israelis do not cross the security barrier into Palestinian-populated areas, and know little or nothing of these developments on the ground which could have a fateful influence on the future of Israel.

Among Palestinians, Israel's opposition to a bi-national state led to another change of position which evolved gradually from the late 1970s onwards. The PLO retained its original option of a single secular bi-national state west of Jordan, but began to take the position that it was prepared to accept a separate Palestinian state in the West Bank and Gaza in land from which Israel had withdrawn under Security Council Resolution 242. Israeli settlements would need to be dismantled and Palestinian refugees allowed to return (to Israel as well as the new Palestine). This new position, formally adopted in December 1988, was overwhelmingly rejected by Israeli public and the main political parties but was later used as the basis of peace discussions in the 1990s.

Various Israelis and Palestinians who oppose a one-state solution have come to believe that it may come to pass. Israeli Prime Minister Olmert argued, in a 2007 interview with the Israeli daily Haaretz, that without a two-state agreement Israel would face "a South African-style struggle for equal voting rights" in which case "Israel [would be] finished". This echoes comments made in 2004 by Palestinian Prime Minister Ahmed Qurei, who said that if Israel failed to conclude an agreement with the Palestinians, that the Palestinians would pursue a single, bi-national state. Several other high-level Fatah Palestinian Authority officials have voiced similar opinions, including Hani Al-Masri. In 2004, Yasser Arafat said “time is running out for a two-state solution” in an interview with Britain's The Guardian newspaper. Many political analysts, including Omar Barghouti, believe that the death of Arafat harbingers the bankruptcy of the Oslo Accords and the two-state solution.

The prominent proponents for the one-state solution include Muammar al-Gaddafi of Libya (see also Saif Islam Qaddafi Isratin proposal), Palestinian author Ali Abunimah, Palestinian-American producer Jamal Dajani, Palestinian lawyer Michael Tarazi, Jeff Halper, Israeli writer Dan Gavron, Israeli historian Ilan Pappé, Palestinian-American law professor George Bisharat, Lebanese-American academic Saree Makdisi, and American academic Virginia Tilley. They cite the expansion of the Israeli Settler movement, especially in the West Bank, as a compelling rationale for bi-nationalism and the increased unfeasibility of the two-state alternative. They advocate a secular and democratic state while still maintaining a Jewish presence and culture in the region. They concede that this alternative will erode the dream of Jewish supremacy in terms of governance in the long run.

== Demographics ==
Religion in proposed Isratin (2022)
1. Islam (50.0%)
2. Judaism (48.0%)
3. Christianity (1.50%)
4. Others (0.50%)

Israel’s population stood at 9.6 million, with 7.1 million, or 73.7 percent, being Jewish by faith. The State of Palestine’s population is estimated at slightly more than half the size of Israel’s, at approximately 5.3 million. Thus, combining the populations of Israel and Palestine yields a total population of 14.8 million. The Jewish proportion of that combined population turns out to be a minority of 48%, numbering roughly 7.1 million. The Muslim proportion stands at 50%, numbering 7.4 million, Christian proportion at 1.5%, numbering 222,000, and others (includes Druze and Atheists) numbering 78,000, comprising 0.5% of the population as of 2022 estimation.

== Criticisms ==
The map shows the diplomatic recognition for both Israel and Palestine. Israel and the Palestinian Territories Recognition of Israel only Recognition of both Israel and Palestinian State Recognition of Palestinian State only No recognition

The Isratin scenario is generally criticized by a majority of both Israelis and Palestinians.

Critics on both sides of the Israeli-Palestinian dispute argue that such an entity would destroy the rights of both societies to self-determination.

Israeli Jews generally assume that a one-state scenario would negate Israel's status as a homeland for the Jewish people. When proposed as a political solution by non-Israelis (as distinct from gradually sliding into an Isratin situation by virtue of continuous Jewish West Bank settlement) the natural assumption is that the idea is most probably being put forward by those who are politically motivated to harm Israel.

Most Israelis, including Israeli Jews, Israeli Druze, the majority of Israeli Bedouin, many Israeli Christian Arabs and some Israeli Muslim Arabs, fear the consequences of amalgamation with a population that may carry a different culture, level of secularism and level of democracy. (Israeli Druze and Bedouin serve in the IDF and there are sometimes rifts between these groups and Palestinians.) Critics state that the existing level of rights and equality for all Israeli citizens would be put in jeopardy. Furthermore, residents of the large Israeli Arab population centers in Wadi Ara and the Triangle, contiguous with the West Bank, have expressed fierce opposition to their areas being annexed to the Palestinian state within a land swap in the final status agreement and assumedly would respond similarly to an Isratin proposition under which they would by default be deemed to be more Palestinian than Israeli.

Students of the Middle East, including erstwhile critic of Israel Benny Morris, have argued that the one-state solution is not viable because of Arab unwillingness to accept a Jewish national presence in the Middle East.

In a 2007 poll of 580 Israelis, 70% of Israeli Jews stated that they support the two-state solution. A 2005 poll of 1,319 Palestinians indicated that a small majority of those in the West Bank and Gaza Strip support the two-state solution based on the 1967 borders.

== See also ==
- Hannah Arendt
- Hugo Bergmann
- Ghada Karmi
- Multiculturalism
- Israel and the United Nations
- Palestine and the United Nations

== Bibliography ==
- Abunimah, Ali, One Country, A Bold Proposal to End the Israeli-Palestinian Impasse New York: Metropolitan Books, 2006 ISBN 978-0-8050-8666-9
- "Palestine – Divided or United? The Case for a Bi-National Palestine before the United Nations" by M. Reiner; Lord Samuel; E. Simon; M. Smilansky; Judah Leon Magnes. Ihud Jerusalem 1947. Includes submitted written and oral testimony before UNSCOP; IHud's Proposals include: political, immigration, land, development (Reprinted Greenwood Press Reprint, Westport, CT, 1983, ISBN 0-8371-2617-7)
- Alan Dershowitz. The Case for Peace: How the Arab-Israeli Conflict Can Be Resolved. Hoboken: John Wiley & Sons, Inc., 2005.
- Hattis, Susan Lee. The Binational Idea in Palestine during Mandatory Times. Haifa: Shikmona, 1970.
- "Begin Loyalist Given Inside Track for Dayan's Job", Washington Post, November 14, 1979
- "The Population of Israel", Friedlander D. and Goldscheider C., Hebrew University, 1980
- "Fifteen Years' Successful Conquest Has Wounded Israel's Soul", Washington Post, June 6, 1982
- "Demography in the Land of Israel in the Year 2000", Sofer A., the University of Haifa, 1987
- Paul R. Mendes-Flohr A Land of Two Peoples: Martin Buber on Jews and Arabs. Gloucester, Mass: Peter Smith, 1994.
- Ruth Gavison, "Jewish and Democratic? A Rejoinder to the 'Ethnic Democracy' Debate," Israel Studies, March 31, 1999
- Leon, Dan. Binationalism: A Bridge over the Chasm. Palestine–Israel Journal, July 31, 1999.
- Tilley, Virginia. The One-State Solution: A Breakthrough for Peace in the Israeli-Palestinian Deadlock, University of Michigan Press, May 2005
- Said, E. The End of the Peace Process: Oslo and After, Granta Books, London: 2000
- Pressman, Jeremy, "The Best Hope – Still?" Boston Review, July/August 2009.
