= Jess Ghannam =

Palestinian-American psychologist and professor

- جيس غنام
- Occupations: Psychologist and professor

Jess Ghannam (Arabic: جيس غنام, romanized: Jys Ghannām) is a Palestinian-American psychologist and professor who is active in numerous non-governmental organizations and in carrying out humanitarian work, particularly in the Gaza Strip. He is a volunteer clinical professor at the University of California, San Francisco.

Ghannam received his A.B. in Psychology from the University of Michigan, Ann Arbor in 1979, before going on to earn an M.A. in Psychology, an M.S. in Medical Sciences and a Ph.D. in Clinical Psychology from the University of California, Berkeley. In addition, he was a post-doctoral fellow in Psychology at Stanford University in California.

Since the early 1990s, Ghannam has worked extensively in the field of medical development in the occupied Palestinian Territories of the West Bank and Gaza Strip. He is a board member of the Gaza Community Health Clinic, and has established medical clinics in towns and cities across the Gaza Strip, including Gaza City, Khan Younis, Jabalia and Deir el-Balah.

Ghannam is also the former president of the San Francisco chapter of the American-Arab Anti-Discrimination Committee, and a member of the international executive committee of Al-Awda, the Palestinian Right to Return Coalition. He is also the co-host of "Arab Talk with Jess and Jamal", a San Francisco Bay Area radio talk-show about Middle Eastern Affairs with fellow Palestinian-American commentator Jamal Dajani.
