= Occupied Minds =

Occupied Minds: A Palestinian-Israeli journey beyond hope and despair
- Directed by: Jamal Dajani, David Michaelis
- Written by: Jamal Dajani, David Michaelis
- Produced by: Jamal Dajani, David Michaelis
- Production company: Link TV
- Distributed by: Arab Film Distribution
- Release date: March 2006
- Running time: 60 minutes
- Country: United States
- Languages: Arabic, English and Hebrew

Occupied Minds: A Palestinian-Israeli journey beyond hope and despair is a 2006 documentary film that was written, produced, and directed by journalists Jamal Dajani and David Michaelis. The film first released in the United States in March 2006 and centers upon the Palestinian-Israeli conflict.

== Synopsis ==
The film follows Dajani and Michaelis as they travel to Jerusalem, their mutual birthplace. While there they investigate and interview several people on how they view their daily lives and the Palestinian-Israeli conflict. The two also try to suggest and look into several possible solutions to the conflict.

== Reception ==
The Washington Report on Middle East Affairs praised the documentary and called it a "must see film".

PBS's Frontline selected the film for its Frontline/World Rough Cut series.
