= Mosaic: World News from the Middle East =

US television program

- Logo
- Country of origin: United States
- Original language: English

Original release
- Network: LinkTV
- Release: 2001 – 2013

Mosaic: World News from The Middle East was a daily news program offered by the free American satellite channel, LinkTV. Mosaic featured selections from television news programs produced by broadcast outlets throughout the Middle East. The news reports were presented unedited, translated into English when necessary. The "Mosaic" series was created by Stephen Olsson and Kim Spencer. Its founding producer was Jamal Dajani, a Palestinian American and it was co-produced by David Michaelis, an Israeli Jew. From late 2010 until 2013, the daily Mosaic program was co-produced by Lara Bitar and Abdullah Edwan.

== Awards ==
It won a Peabody Award in 2004.

== Distribution ==
Mosaic was broadcast on Link TV, a free informational channel available on DirecTV, Dish Network and some US cable TV systems; and is archived by the Internet Archive, from which it can be viewed.

== Sources ==
Network	Country
Public Establishment of Television (Algeria TV)	Algeria
Nile TV	Egypt
Jordan Satellite Channel	Jordan
Israel Broadcasting Authority	Israel
Al Iraqiya, Al Sharqiya, Al Sumaria	Iraq
Al-Alam News Network, IRINN, Jame Jam TV, Press TV	Iran
Future TV, National Broadcasting Network, New TV	Lebanon
2M	Morocco
Palestinian Satellite Channel	Palestine
RT Arabic	Russia
Syria TV	Syria
Al Arabiya	Saudi Arabia
Sudan TV	Sudan
Al Jazeera	Qatar
Abu Dhabi TV, Dubai TV	United Arab Emirates
BBC Arabic, Arab News Network	United Kingdom
Yemen TV	Yemen

=== Former ===
Network	Country	Notes
Al-Manar	Lebanon	Dropped in 2005. Hezbollah's TV station.
Iraq TV	Iraq	Shut down due to the Iraq war. Would be replaced by Al-Iraqiyah.

== Funding ==
Mosaic was supported by the William and Flora Hewlett Foundation, the John S. and James L. Knight Foundation, the Firedoll Foundation, and Link TV viewers.

== Controversy ==
In January 2004, and again in January 2005, disputes arose over the airing of Mosaic on NewTV, the Public-access television cable TV channel of Newton, Massachusetts. Opponents of its airing argued that the program provides a distorted view of Arab broadcasts, and a venue for antisemitism, anti-Americanism, and "terrorist propaganda". Supporters of the program, while conceding that the broadcasts may on occasion contain "anti-Semitic and anti-American content", argued that they "give Americans a diverse array of information about how the country is portrayed in the Middle East", and that their broadcast is a free speech issue.

Mosaic has also been criticized by the Committee for Accuracy in Middle East Reporting in America, which claims it "whitewashes terrorism and promotes extremism".
