= ImMEDIAte Justice Productions =

imMEDIAte Justice
- Current logo
- Abbreviation: IMJ
- Formation: 2008
- Purpose: Youth Empowerment
- Region served: Los Angeles
- Members: Volunteer
- Current Director: Tani Ikeda
- Website: imMEDIAte Justice Productions

imMEDIAte Justice Productions (also known as imMEDIAte Justice Collective and simply imMEDIAte Justice) is a non-profit organization that teaches hands-on filmmaking and media literacy with a focus on Reproductive Justice to youth in the East and South Los Angeles areas. It was founded by Sylvia Raskin, Laney Rupp, and Tani Ikeda in 2008. The current program director is Tani Ikeda, who is a director/cinematographer working in Los Angeles. The program curriculum focuses on teaching documentary-style filmmaking with the aim of encouraging students to share their personal experiences.

== Recent work ==
In April 2011, imMEDIAte Justice was included in Los Angeles' Women Action Media (WAM) conference where they presented a workshop on media literacy. Also in Spring 2011, they attended UC Berkeley's Empowering Women of Color Conference and led a mentors workshop in Media Justice and Health and led a filmmaking and sexuality workshop at the Sex Positive Conference at CSU Long Beach.

In the Fall of 2010, they taught an animation curriculum designed and led by animator Laura Yilmaz, the students created four 30-second PSAs using pixillation animation techniques which premiered on December 3, 2010 at the National Center for the Preservation of Democracy in Little Tokyo, Los Angeles.

== Festivals and screenings ==
In 2009, they produced the short documentary-style film "Mariposa" directed by Espie Hernandez. The short has since gained considerable recognition and momentum spurring interviews from CNN, NBC, MTV, and Univision as well as a number of other media outlets.

In 2010 "Mariposa" was screened at the Human Rights Watch Film Festival in New York City. In March 2011 "Mariposa" was broadcast by LinkTV as a part of their "Youth Producing Change" program.

In both 2010 and 2011 they premiered their latest work in pixillation animation at the National Center for the Preservation of Democracy in Little Tokyo, Los Angeles. The event was covered by various local media outlets as well as KPFK's Feminist Magazine.

== Grants and awards ==
In Summer 2008, imMEDIAte Justice received a $3,000 grant to work with youth in conjunction with the National Center for the Preservation of Democracy on short films addressing issues of Democracy.

In Spring of 2009, the organization received a $3,000 Outstanding Commitment in Education Award from the Clinton Global Initiative.

In Spring 2009, the organization received a $10,000 grant from dosomething.org.

In April 2010, they won a $25,000 grant from the Pepsi Refresh Project.

== Media coverage ==
Their students have been interviewed by NBC, and Feminist Magazine on KPFK.

They have been profiled in Make/Shift Magazine's issue Seven in Fall 2010, and by Good Magazine. They have also been covered in Utne Reader.

In 2011, they were featured in a Huffington Post sponsor-generated article highlighting twelve different Pepsi Refresh grant winners.
