= Virginia Tilley =

Political scientist

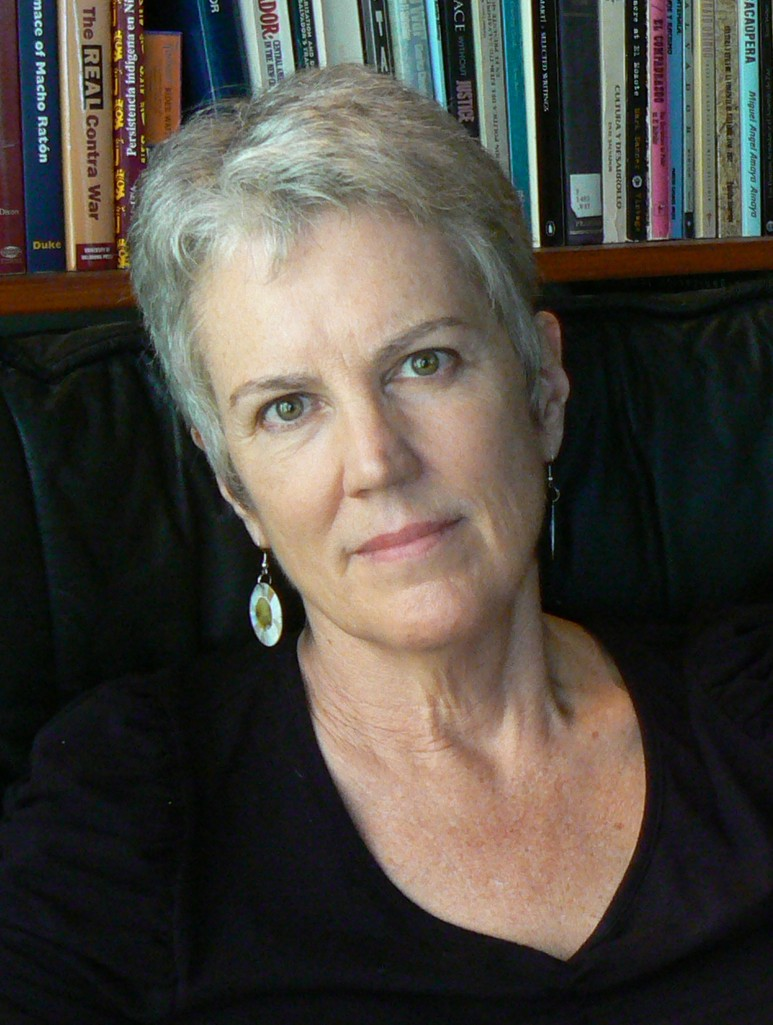
Tilley in May 2014

Virginia Tilley (born 1953) is an American political scientist specializing in the comparative study of ethnic and racial conflict. She is a professor of political science at Southern Illinois University-Carbondale in the US.

== Background ==
Tilley's grandfather was the early filmmaker W.H. Tilley. Her parents were English professor Wesley H. Tilley, Jr. and Barbara. She has two siblings, John and Susan (1945-2023.) She grew up in Gainesville, Florida, Davidson, North Carolina, Decatur, Illinois, New York and Absecon, New Jersey. In her youth she developed a keen interest in science fiction and in the natural sciences, especially animal behavior.

== Career ==
Tilley received her BA in Political Science from Antioch College (1986) and an MA from the Centre for Contemporary Arab Studies at Georgetown (1988). She completed an MA and PhD in Political Science at the University of Wisconsin-Madison (1997), where she studied comparative politics and theories of ethnic, racial and national identities under Professor M. Crawford Young and international relations theory under Professors Michael Barnett and Emanuel Adler.

After finishing her MA in Arab Studies at Georgetown, she served as Assistant Director of the International Organisation for the Elimination of All Forms of Racial Discrimination (EAFORD) in Washington DC, where she developed a second field in the politics of indigenous peoples. This interest led her to focus her doctoral dissertation on the politics of 'being Indian' or indigeneity in Latin America, published in 2005 as Seeing Indians: A Study of Race, Nation and Power in El Salvador (University of New Mexico Press).

In 1997, Tilley joined the Department of Political Science at Hobart and William Smith Colleges (HWS) where she taught courses on Latin American politics, the politics of development, and Middle East politics, as well as introductory courses on international relations and comparative politics and senior seminars on comparative racial and ethnic conflict. With Professor Kevin Dunn, she developed the International Relations Major and served as Co-coordinator, and for several years led the Development Studies minor. She was appointed as Associate Professor in 2003 but in 2005 took leave to conduct research in South Africa, initially at the Centre for Policy Studies in Johannesburg.

In 2006, Tilley went on extended leave from HWS to assume a senior post at the Human Sciences Research Council (South Africa) (HSRC), where she conducted studies of South Africa's transition from apartheid to democracy, with special projects on poverty alleviation and rural development. In 2011, she left South Africa to serve as Director of Governance Studies at the University of the South Pacific in Fiji. In 2014, she returned to the United States to assume the position of Chair of Political Science at Southern Illinois University Carbondale. In June 2016, she stepped down as chair and continues at SIUC as tenured full professor.

=== Research ===
Tilley has adopted a critical position regarding the Middle East peace process and has authored several articles and opinion pieces criticizing Israel's occupation policies. In her first book on the topic, The One-State Solution (2005, University of Michigan Press), she argued that Israel's settlements in the West Bank have made a two-state solution obsolete. In her second book, she edited a co-authored study, commissioned by the South African Government and conducted at the HSRC, which found that Israeli policies in the West Bank and Gaza Strip are consistent with colonialism and apartheid as these regimes are codified in international law. Released initially in 2009, this study was later published in 2012 by Pluto Press under the title Beyond Occupation: Apartheid, Colonialism and International Law in the Occupied Palestinian Territories.

Tilley has also specialized in the global comparative politics of settler colonialism and indigenous peoples. Her book on Salvadoran indigenous identity, titled Seeing Indians: A Study of Race, Nation and Power in El Salvador, was published by the University of New Mexico Press in 2005. She has also published or co-authored a series of policy briefs on economic development strategies in post-apartheid South Africa and on nation-building in Fiji and other small island states in the south Pacific.

=== ESCWA report withdrawal ===
Tilley co-authored with Richard Falk a report on Israel released in March 2017 by the United Nations Economic and Social Commission for Western Asia (ESCWA), which accused Israel of racism and apartheid. This report sought to answer the question of whether Israel has established an apartheid system with regards to its relations with Palestinians inside and outside its borders. In this report, Tilley and Falk charged: "By developing discrete bodies of law… for each territory and their Palestinian populations Israel has both effected and veiled a comprehensive policy of apartheid directed at the whole Palestinian people." The pair went on to state that "Israel has exploited this fragmentation to secure Jewish national-domination." The report was strongly condemned by the United States citing anti-Israel bias; Israel's Foreign Ministry spokesman likened the report to Der Stürmer, the anti-Semitic Nazi publication.

The World Jewish Congress responded the report by calling it "propaganda". The Anti-Defamation League (ADL) called the report "hostile and biased". ADL described the authors as having "a demonstrable track record of hostility toward Israel."

UN Secretary-General António Guterres distanced himself from the report, which he stated had been released without authorization, and ordered its removal from the ESCWA website. ESCWA Executive Secretary Rima Khalaf resigned in protest of the Secretary-General's order.

== Awards ==
- Seeing Indians chosen as book of the year by the 2006 Congress of Central American Anthropologists
- 1999 Prize for the best English language article from the Congress on Latin American History, with Prof. Erik Ching.

== Selected articles ==
- — (Spring 2010). "A Palestinian Declaration of Independence: Implications for Peace". Middle East Policy. 17 (1): 52–67. doi:10.1111/j.1475-4967.2010.00425.x.
- — (March–April 2006). "The Secular Solution: Debating Israel-Palestine". New Left Review. 38.
- — (2005). "Mestizaje and the "Ethnicization" of Race in Latin America". In Spickard, Paul R. (ed.). Race And Nation: Ethnic Systems In The Modern World. Routledge. pp. 53–68. ISBN 978-0-415-95003-9.
- — (August 2002). "New Help or New Hegemony? The Transnational Indigenous Peoples' Movement and 'Being Indian' in El Salvador". Journal of Latin American Studies. 34 (3): 525–554. doi:10.1017/S0022216X0200651X. JSTOR 3875460. S2CID 56199864.
- "The Generation of Ethnic Conflict by the International System". In Cris Toffolo, ed., Emancipating Cultural Pluralism, SUNY Press, 2002.
- — (2002). "The Role of the State in Ethnic Conflict: A Constructivist Reassessment". In Green, Daniel M. (ed.). Constructivism Comp Politics. M.E. Sharpe. pp. 151–174. ISBN 978-0-7656-0861-1.
- Ching, Erik; Tilley, Virginia Q. (February 1998). "Indians, the Military and the Rebellion of 1932 in El Salvador". Journal of Latin American Studies. 30 (1): 121–156. doi:10.1017/s0022216x97004926. JSTOR 158450. S2CID 143440116.
- — (July 1997). "The terms of the debate: Untangling language about ethnicity and ethnic movements". Ethnic and Racial Studies. 20 (3): 497–522. doi:10.1080/01419870.1997.9993972.
- — (1996). "Post-Confucianism: The Culturalist Approach to Understanding the East Asian NICs". Asian Thought and Society. 21 (61): 67–80.
