= Michael Tarazi =

Palestinian-American lawyer

Michael Tarazi مايكل طرازي
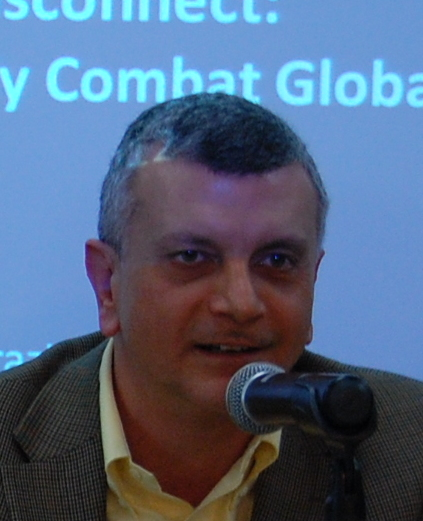
- Born: Kuwait City, Kuwait
- Education: Harvard University
- Occupations: Lawyer, former diplomat

Michael Tarazi is a Palestinian-American lawyer and former adviser to the Palestine Liberation Organization's negotiations team. In 2008 Tarazi joined the government and policy team of the Consultative Group to Assist the Poor (CGAP), an organization that promotes microfinance.

== Biography ==
Tarazi was born in Kuwait City, Kuwait to Palestinian Christian parents. He grew up in Boulder, Colo., and attended Phillips Academy in Andover, Massachusetts. He earned his bachelor's degree from Harvard University and his law degree from Harvard Law School. He spent most of his professional career as a corporate lawyer living in New York City, Helsinki, Paris, Istanbul and Budapest before his time at the PLO.

== Career ==
Tarazi moved to Ramallah in 2000 to work as a spokesman and legal adviser for the PLO's negotiating team. As a fluent English-speaker, he was quoted extensively in the media, including CNN, NBC, ABC and the BBC. He also toured the United States speaking about the Israeli-Palestinian conflict. On June 7, 2002, Tarazi was described in a front-page feature article of the Wall Street Journal as

"the most articulate and sophisticated Palestinian advocate to come along in years."

In 2005, The Economist described the arrival of Tarazi and Diana Buttu in the PLO's negotiating team as closest thing to a "makeover" the Palestinian side's presentation had received, but held that they were nonetheless "outmessaged."

== Personal ==
Tarazi has performed as a stand-up comic in the New York Arab American Comedy Festival, where his biography describes him as "a single, Arab American." He speaks English, Arabic and French.
