= Link TV =

- Country: United States
- Headquarters: Burbank, California (with production offices in Washington, D.C. and San Francisco, California)

Ownership
- Owner: Public Media Group of Southern California
- Sister channels: KCET; KOCE-TV

History
- Launched: December 15, 1999; 26 years ago
- Closed: November 1, 2023 (end of satellite broadcasts)
- Former names: WorldLink (1999–early 2000s)

Links
- Website: www.linktv.org

Availability

Terrestrial
- KRCB (Cotati, California): Channel 22.1 (1-5 AM)

Streaming media
- Link TV: Watch Live

Link TV, originally WorldLink TV, was a non-commercial American satellite television network providing what it described as "diverse perspectives on world and national issues." It was carried nationally on DirecTV (ch. 375) until January 2023 and on Dish Network (ch. 9410) until November 1, 2023. Link TV was launched as a daily, 24-hour non-commercial network on December 15, 1999. It received no money from the satellite providers, but relies instead on contributions from viewers and foundations.

Link TV broadcast a mix of documentaries, global and national news, music of diverse cultures, and programs promoting citizen action. The network also aired English language news from Al Jazeera English, Deutsche Welle, NHK and France 24, as well as various documentaries and world music videos. Select Link TV programs were streamed on the Internet, via the channel's website.

The network also produced Mosaic: World News from the Middle East, a program of translated news reports from the Middle East.

== History ==
Direct satellite broadcasters were mandated to set aside 4% of its channel space for noncommercial educational and informational programming. ITVS, Internews Network and Internews Interactive joined in forming Link Media Inc. to program a channel, WorldLink TV, for this mandate. WorldLink TV was one of the nine channels select to meet the mandate for DirecTV.

The channel was founded by filmmaker Kim Spencer, who had similar experiences since the 1980s, when he made satellite broadcasts between the United States and the Soviet Union. By early 2002, Link TV was being carried out to 17 million households with a potential adult viewing audience of 30 million. At the time, Nielsen did not track ratings for satellite channels, but a study commissioned by the network showed that an estimated 1.2 million viewers watched the channel for a period of one to four hours per week. When the war in Iraq started in 2003, Mosaic gave the channel record high ratings (about 4 million viewers per week), whereas its slate of original programming grew slightly, including a 90-minute talk-show, The Active Opposition. As of June 2003, Link TV employed a staff of 27. Bill Cosby was one of the most notable celebrity viewers.

In October 2012, Link TV announced that it was merging with KCET, an independent public television station in Los Angeles, to form a new nonprofit entity, to be called KCETLink. The entity was headquartered at KCET's Burbank facilities. In 2018, KCETLink merged with the KOCE-TV Foundation to form the Public Media Group of Southern California.

The channel was removed from the DirecTV lineup on January 15, 2023, as Link TV has chosen not to renew its yearly public interest contract with the satellite provider. On November 1, 2023, due to financial issues, Link TV ceased broadcasting on satellite television, with the website recommending viewers to watch licensed programs on the websites and channels of their original broadcasters while the Public Media Group seeks alternative methods to continue operations.

== Production and projects ==
In 2010, Link TV announced the launch of ViewChange.org, an online video platform funded by the Bill & Melinda Gates Foundation that aims to raise awareness of global development issues. It applies Semantic Web technology to video, in order to automatically create links to related content from other online sources.

In conjunction with the New York City Human Rights Watch International Film Festival, LinkTV broadcast a "Youth Producing Change" program which showcases the works of youth from all over the world. They also support efforts to fund groups such as imMEDIAte Justice Productions which help youth create their own film works.

Production facilities for Link TV are in San Francisco, Washington, D.C., and Burbank, California.

== Programs ==
=== Original ===
- Mosaic: World News from the Middle East
- Mosaic Intelligence Report
- Global Pulse
- Latin Pulse
- CINEMONDO
- Global Spirit
- Explore
- Earth Focus
- Who Speaks for Islam
- Bridge to Iran
- Real Conversations
- Global Lens
- Oceans 8
- DOC-DEBUT
- 4REAL
- Men of Words
- Lunch with Bokara
- Bokara's Conversations on Consciousness
- U.S.-Muslim Engagement Project
- Ethics and the World Crisis
- ColorLines
- Future Express
- Connections
- The Israel Lobby
- Youth Producing Change
- LinkAsia
- World Music

=== Licensed ===
- DW News
- Borgen
- France 24 World News
- Democracy Now!
- DocFilm (Deutsche Welle)
- Newshour (Al Jazeera English)
- NHK Newsline
- Sleepless in Gaza...and Jerusalem
- TED Talks
- Arab Labor
- Rappers, Divas, Virtuosos: New Music From the Muslim World
- bro'Town

== Affiliates ==
- KCET
- KOCE-TV
- KRCB 1 a.m. to 5 a.m.

== See also ==
- United States cable news
- List of United States over-the-air television networks
- List of United States pay television channels
- List of independent television stations in the United States
