= Jamal Dajani =

Palestinian-American journalist

- جمال الدجاني
- Mosaic Intelligence Report – Studio
- Born: April 2, 1957 (age 69); Jerusalem
- Status: Married
- Education: Columbia University
- Occupation: Broadcast journalist

Jamal Dajani (Arabic: جمال الدجاني) is a Palestinian-American journalist and producer. He is the co-founder of Arab Talk Radio. He formerly served as Director of Strategic Communications & Media for former Palestinian Prime Minister Rami Hamdallah. Prior to this he was Vice President of Middle East and North Africa at Internews. He is currently a lecturer at San Francisco State University.

== Biography ==
Born in Jerusalem to a prominent Palestinian family that served as custodians of King David’s mausoleum in Mount Zion, Dajani completed his early studies at Collège des Frères and attended Columbia University in New York City, where he received a B.A. in Political Science.

Dajani is former Vice President of Middle East and North Africa at Internews, an international non-profit organization whose mission is to empower local media worldwide to give people the news and information they need, the ability to connect and the means to make their voices heard. Prior to this, he was the Vice President of International News at Link TV and co-creator and series producer of Mosaic: World News from the Middle East, winner of a Peabody Award. In 2006, Dajani launched the Mosaic Intelligence Report, a weekly video analysis broadcast on Link TV and distributed online. He has also worked as producer and in an editorial capacity on several television productions, including Occupied Minds (a documentary about the Palestinian-Israeli conflict), Who Speaks for Islam?, and PBS Frontline World War of Ideas, where he acted . as a consultant. Dajani has made guest appearances on numerous television and radio networks, and is a contributor to the Listening Post on Al Jazeera English. He has published several articles on the Middle East and blogs regularly on The Huffington Post. He is the co-host of Arab Talk on KPOO radio.

Dajani was appointed by then-Mayor Gavin Newsom to the San Francisco Immigrant Rights Commission where he served as Chair (2005–2009), and served on the San Francisco Human Rights Commission (2009–2011). He served for two years (2003–2004) as President of the Arab Cultural and Community Center of San Francisco, and served on the board of New America Media, a collaboration of ethnic news organizations in the U.S.

== Awards ==
- 64th Annual Peabody Award for excellence in radio and television broadcasting – Producer, Mosaic
- 10th Annual Webby Awards Honoree – Producer, Mosaic
- ACCC- Community Service Award – 2005
- New California Media "Pathbreaker" Special Achievement Award – 2003
- City & County of San Francisco – Certificate of Honor – 2010
- San Francisco Immigrant Rights Commission – Certificate of Honor – 2009
- State of Californian Senate – Certificate of Recognition – 2009

== See also ==
- Occupied Minds, a 2006 documentary film about the Palestinian - Israeli conflict
