= Canadian Zionist Federation =

Canadian nonprofit organization

- Abbreviation: CZF
- Established: 1967
- Founded at: Montreal, Quebec
- Type: Non-profit
- Headquarters: Toronto
- Location: Canada
- Official language: English, French, Hebrew
- Website: www.czf.ca

Canadian Zionist Federation (Hebrew: הפדרציה הציונית של קנדה), or CZF, is a nonprofit organization that promotes Zionism, founded in 1967.

Its aim is to promote Zionism in Canada and to assist in the strengthening the State of Israel. The CZF seeks to enrich Canadian Jewish life through Jewish education, Israel and Zionist information, promotion of Aliyah, and activities among Canadian Jewish youth. The CZF is a mixed territorial body composed of sixteen constituent organizations operating in six regions and has 15,000 members across in Canada. The CZF is the official representative of the World Zionist Organization in Canada and selects Canada's delegation to the World Zionist Congress every five years.

== History ==
The Canadian Zionist Federation was founded in 1967 as an umbrella organization whose members included Zionist Organization of Canada, Canadian Hadassah-WIZO, the Labour Zionist Movement of Canada, Mizrachi Hapoel Hamizrachi Organization of Canada, Zionist Revisionist Organization of Canada, Ahdut HaAvoda, and Friends of Pioneering Israel (MAPAM).

== Mission ==
The mission of the Canadian Zionist Federation (CZF) is to strengthen the connection between Canadian Jews and Israel, and to educate the Canadian public about Zionism. Through a range of programs and initiatives, including educational resources, cultural events, and advocacy efforts, CZF works to support the State of Israel and to foster a deep understanding and appreciation of the rich history and culture of the Jewish people.

One of the key goals is to attract Israeli innovation to a Canadian market. The CZF believes that the vibrant and dynamic entrepreneurial ecosystem in Israel has much to offer Canada, and is committed to facilitating connections and partnership between Canadian and Israeli businesses. By attracting Israeli innovation to the Canadian market, the CZF hopes to not only to support the growth and success of Israeli businesses, but also to bring new technologies and ideas to Canada, helping to drive economic growth and progress.

The organization provides Israel education and engagement resources and by facilitating dialogue, debate, and collective action in communities across the Canada.

=== World Zionist Congress elections ===
The composition of Canada's delegation to the World Zionist Congress has usually been decided by consensus among Canadian Zionist organizations and congregational groups. The delegation of 20 to the 38th World Zionist Congress in 2020 consisted of 6 for the Reform Judaism movement, 5 representing Russian-Canadian Jews, 4 representing the Modern Orthodox Mizrachi movement, 3 for Mercaz representing Conservative Judaism, 1 for Labor Zionism, and one for Herut.

It was agreed to hold elections for the 39th World Zionist Congress in 2025 to open to all eligible Canadian Jewish adults who agree with the Jerusalem Program and pay a nominal $2 fee.

The 2025 vote elected a slate that was made up of a majority of progreassive delegates. 10 of the 19 delegates elected were affiliated with liberal Judaism and progressive groups. 17,878 votes were cast.

19 delegates were elected as follows:

Slate	Votes	Seats	Position/Ideology
Orthodox Israel Coalition —- Mizrahi	4,013	4	Religious Zionism, Modern Orthodox
Vote Reform —- ARZA Canada	3,508	4	Reform Judaism
Hatikvah Canada Democratic Israel	2,830	3	Ameinu/Meretz liberal progressive
United Eretz Hakodesh and Shaas	2,628	3	Haredi Ashkenazi, ultra-Orthodox and Haredi Shephardic
MERCAZ Canada	2,614	3	Conservative-Masorti Judaism
Canadian Forum of Russian-Speaking Jewry - United for Israel	1,106	1	Russian-speaking Jews, Yisrael Beiteinu
Likud Canada/Canadians for a Safe Israel	474	1	Right-wing Zionism, conservative, pro-Netanyahu
Canadian Young Judaea	430	0	Zionist youth, centrist
Herut Canada	275	0	Revisionist Zionism, Jabotinskyism

== Presidents ==
- Philip Gerard Givens: 1973–1985
- Kurt Rothschild: 1993–2008
- Norm Stern: 2008–2015
- Les Rothschild: 2015–2022
- Rabbi Moshe Ressin: 2022–January 2024
- Les Rothschild: January 2024 – 2025
- Stan Greenspan: 2025–present
