= 39th World Zionist Congress =

Congress of the World Zionist Organization in 2025

39th World Zionist Congress הקונגרס הציוני העולמי ה-39
- Begins: October 28, 2025
- Ends: October 30, 2025
- Frequency: Every five years
- Location: Jerusalem
- Inaugurated: 1897
- Founder: Theodor Herzl
- Previous event: 2020 (38th)
- Participants: 775 delegates (543 in factions and 232 in organizations)
- Organizer: World Zionist Organization

The 39th World Zionist Congress convened in Jerusalem from October 28–29, 2025.

World Zionist Congresses choose who will occupy leadership positions, and determine policy for the World Zionist Organization (WZO) and other national institutions, including the Jewish National Fund (JNF), the Jewish Agency for Israel (JAFI) and Keren Hayesod.

The national institutions governed by the congress (WZO, JNF, JAFI, and others) collectively spend approximately US$1 billion annually on their activities.

The 39th Congress took place shortly after the beginning of the ceasefire in the 2023—2025 Gaza war.

== Delegates ==
The Congress is composed of 525 (increased at the 39th Congress to 543) territorial delegates representing Zionist Organizations all over the world: 203 (38%) from Israel, based on the most recent election results for the Israeli knesset, 155 (29%) from the United States, and the remainder from the rest of the Jewish diaspora (33%). Delegates in the diaspora were elected by votes open to all Jewish adults who asserted agreement with the Jerusalem Program and paid a nominal fee. While this had been the norm in the past in the United States, it was the first time elections were held in several countries where previously the composition of that country's slate was decided by "backroom deals" among Zionist organizations. In total, approximately 265,000 voters participated in the elections.

In addition to the territorial delegates, there are another 232 delegates representing International Jewish organizations (with full voting rights).

=== Distribution of mandates ===
Source: World Zionist Organization

Distribution of Mandates: 39th World Zionist Congress (2025)
Country	Mandates	Zionist Youth	Lavi Olami	Merkaz Olami	Avoda–Etz	Meretz Olami	Artzeinu	Likud Olami	Mizrachi	Beiteinu Olami	Shas Olami	Confederation	Eretz HaKodesh	Herut Olami	Ma'avar LaKeshet	Yesh Atid	Blue and White	National Union	Am Yisrael Chai	Otzma Yehudit	Other (Named Slates)
Israel	203				8			63		12	22					47	16	11		10	14; 8 – Tikva Hadasha; 2 – Atid Ehad; 2 – Eretz Yisrael Shelanu; 2 – Noam
United States	155		4	19	5	3	33	6	18	1	2	4	19	1					21		19; 5 – Rosh HaTorah; 4 – IAC; 3 – AID; 2 – B’Yachad; 2 – Israel365; 1 – Jewish Future; 1 – Dorshei Torah VeTzion; 1 – ANU
France	21			2		4	2	1	1		6		5								
Canada	19			3	2	1	4	1	4	1	2		1								
United Kingdom	19			2	2	1	3		3		3		5								
Argentina	14	1		3	1	2	1	1					2	1	1						
Australia	13			1	1	1	3	1	4				2								
Russia	9	1	1	1			1	1		1		1	1	1							
Global lists	9	1		1	1	1		1	1			1	1	1							
Brazil	8				1	2	1	1	2				1								
Mexico	7	1		1	1	1		1	1												
Hungary	6	1		1		1	1	1	1												
South Africa	6				1		2	2													
Uruguay	6	1		1	1	1		1	1												
Belgium	5	1				1		2					1								
Ukraine	5			1					1	1	1										
Chile	4	1		1		1			1												
Italy	3					1		1	1												
Venezuela	3				1	1						1									
Germany	2				1	1															
Netherlands	2						1					1									
Sweden	2			1					1												
Switzerland	2					1									1						
Austria	1							1													
Azerbaijan	1										1										
Bulgaria	1						1														
Belarus	1										1										
Colombia	1	1																			
Costa Rica	1	1																			
Denmark	1						1														
Ecuador	1				1																
Greece	1	1																			
Guatemala	1								1												
India	1							1													
Kazakhstan	1									1											
New Zealand	1						1														
Panama	1								1												
Paraguay	1	1																			
Peru	1	1																			
Romania	1					1															
Serbia	1									1											
Spain	1	1																			
Uganda	1			1																	
International Organizations	26																				26 Fixed allocations for WIZO, Hadassah, B’nai B’rith, etc.
TOTALS	543	14	5	39	27	25	55	86	42	20	36	8	38	4	2	47	16	11	21	10	33

=== Israel ===
Israel’s 203 mandates are distributed based on parties’ representation in the current Knesset with non-Zionist Haredi and Arab parties excluded. Likud has 63 seats, followed by Yesh Atid at 47, Religious Zionism 27, National Unity (Benny Gantz) 24, Shas 22, Yisrael Beiteinu 12, and the Israel Labor Party 8.

Party	Mandates (of 203)	Percentage	Position / Ideology
Likud	63	31.0%	Right-wing, conservative-national
Yesh Atid	47	23.2%	Centrist, Liberal Zionism
Religious Zionism	27	13.3%	Far-right, religious-nationalist
National Unity	24	11.8%	Center-right, liberal-national
Shas	22	10.8%	Haredi, Sephardi Orthodox
Yisrael Beiteinu	12	5.9%	Right-wing, secular nationalist
Israeli Labor Party	8	3.9%	Center-left, Labor Zionism
*Non-Zionist Haredi and Israeli Arab parties excluded.

=== United States ===
Voting for 155 US delegates occurred from March 10 to May 4, 2025. Twenty-two slates ran candidates, up from thirteen in 2020. 224,969 valid votes were cast, an 80% increase from the 123,575 votes cast in 2020. 18,948 votes were invalidated after an investigation, due to "potentially fraudulent activity". As a result, the Shas USA slate representing religious Sephardic voters was disqualified and three other Orthodox or Haredi slates were penalized. Six slates were suspected of vote fraud: Am Yisrael Chai, Eretz Hakodesh, ZOA, Shas, Herut and Achdut Israel. Upon appeal, Shas was reinstated, and fines were levied against Eretz Hakodesh and ZOA, but their vote count was not penalized. Achdut Israel, which would have otherwise qualified for a seat, was disqualified as its slate did not meet eligibility requirements.

According to an analysis of the initial results by the Times of Israel, right-wing slates won 81 seats while liberal slates won 71 seats and overall, over 40% of the vote was won by right-wing Orthodox and Haredi slates.

Slate	Votes	Percentage	Seats	Position / Ideology
Vote Reform	47,648	21.1%	33	Reform Judaism, Liberal
Am Yisrael Chai	30,114	13.4%	21	Orthodox, Right-wing Youth
Eretz Hakodesh	28,165	12.5%	19	Haredi, Right-wing, UTJ-aligned
Mercaz	27,765	12.3%	19	Conservative/Masorti, Liberal
Orthodox Israel Coalition	26,640	11.8%	18	Modern Orthodox, Religious Zionist
Hatikvah	11,505	5.1%	8	Centre-left, Progressive Zionist
ZOA Coalition	8,402	3.73%	6	Right-wing, Pro-Americanism
Aish Ha’am	6,564	2.92%	5	Orthodox, Right-wing
Kol Israel	5,278	2.35%	4	Centrist, General Zionist
Israeli-American Council (IAC)	5,275	2.34%	4	Israeli American interests
VISION	5,214	2.32%	4	Revisionist Zionism
AID Coalition (America–Israel Democracy)	4,844	2.15%	3	Israeli-American, Anti-Netanyahu
Beyachad – TOGETHER FOR ISRAEL	3,048	1.35%	2	Russian-American, Orthodox
Shas Olami	2,492	1.11%	2	Sephardic Orthodox, Shas-affiliated
Israel365 Action	2,322	1.03%	2	Right-wing, Anti–two-state solution
Dorshei Torah V’Tzion	1,939	0.86%	1	Liberal Orthodox
The Jewish Future	1,787	0.79%	1	Liberal Zionism
ANU: A New Union	1,504	0.67%	1	Pro–two-state, Progressive
American Forum for Israel	1,472	0.65%	1	Yisrael Beiteinu affiliation
Herut North America – The Jabotinsky Movement	1,100	0.49%	1	Revisionist Zionist, Right-wing
Achdut Israel	1,509	0.67%	0	Haredi, Disqualified
Americans 4 Israel: Strength Through Unity	382	0.17%	0	Pro-Americanism

WZO Chairman Yaakov Hagoel observed that: “For the first time, the conservative and right-wing bloc has achieved a clear majority."

=== France ===
The 21 French mandates were distributed as follows: Kol Israel Chai list (Shas and Religious Zionism) 11, Our Country - Centre 4, Meretz 4, Likud 1, List of Eastern France (Mizrachi) 1. Elections were held from April 1 to June 5, 2025.

Slate	Votes	Percentage	Seats	Position/Ideology
Kol Israel Hai	4,013	53.5%	11	Religious Zionism, Shas
Arzenu-Mercaz	1,104	19.8%	4	Progressive/Meretz
Sionisme Democratique	903	16.02%	4	Centrist
Likud	307	15.5%	1	Right-wing
Mizrahi France	307	15.5%	1	Mizrahi Jews
Herut	49	0.9%	0	Revisionist Zionism, Jabotinskyism
Results Source:

=== Canada ===
Voting was conducted from June 5 to June 15, 2025 by the Canadian Zionist Federation and elected a slate that was made up of a majority of progressive delegates. 10 of the 19 delegates elected were affiliated with liberal Judaism and progressive groups. Voting was open to all Canadian Jewish adults, provided they agreed with the Jerusalem Program. Almost 18,000 votes were cast. This was the first election held "in a generation". Usually, Canada's slate is decided by consensus among Canadian Zionist Federation member organizations. The release of results was delayed due to investigation of "irregularities" in the online vote.

19 delegates were elected by 17,878 voters as follows.

Slate	Votes	Seats	Position/Ideology
Orthodox Israel Coalition —- Mizrahi	4,013	4	Religious Zionism, Modern Orthodox
Vote Reform —- ARZA Canada	3,508	4	Reform Judaism
Hatikvah Canada Democratic Israel	2,830	3	Ameinu/Meretz liberal progressive
United Eretz Hakodesh and Shaas	2,628	3	Haredi Ashkenazi and Shephardic, ultra-Orthodox
MERCAZ Canada	2,614	3	Conservative-Masorti Judaism
Canadian Forum of Russian-Speaking Jewry - United for Israel	1,106	1	Russian-speaking Jews, Yisrael Beiteinu
Likud Canada/Canadians for a Safe Israel	474	1	Right-wing Zionism, conservative, pro-Netanyahu
Canadian Young Judaea	430	0	Zionist youth, centrist
Herut Canada	275	0	Revisionist Zionism, Jabotinskyism

=== United Kingdom ===
10,651 votes were cast from 8 to 12 June 2025 to elect 19 delegates in an election which saw right-wing Orthodox and left-wing progressive slates gain at the expense of centrists, who were shut out in the first fully-contested election in two decades. Overall, right-wing and Orthodox slates won 11 seats while left-wing and progressive slates won the remaining eight.

Slate	Votes	Percentage	Seats	Position / Ideology
Eretz HaKodesh (EHK)	4,529	—	5	Ultra-Orthodox Haredi
Shas Olami	~1,000	—	3	Sephardi Orthodox; aligned with Shas
Mizrachi	~1,000	—	3	Mainstream Orthodox; led by Chief Rabbi Sir Ephraim Mirvis
Our Israel	2,099	—	5	Liberal; Masorti and Reform
Jewish Labour Movement–Meretz	~1,000	—	3	Progressive
Jabotinsky’s Israel	—	—	0	Right-wing; Likud-aligned
Kol Israel	—	—	0	non-denominational
Israel Solidarity Campaign UK	—	—	0	UK-Israel Relationship
HaNoar HaTzioni	—	—	0	Zionism

Earlier, the EHK slate had been suspended for publishing an advertisement advising husbands that they could vote on behalf of their wives and children, contrary to election rules. The suspension was subsequently overturned.

According to election rules adopted by the UK elections body, slates could only win a maximum of five seats. Due to this restriction, EHK and Shas ran as separate slates in hopes of winning more seats between them. In other countries, the two ran as a joint slate.

=== Australia ===
Australia's World Zionist Congress election was conducted by the Zionist Federation of Australia from 1 July 2025 to 27 July 2025, electing 13 delegates. The results were:

Slate	Votes	Percentage	Seats	Position / Ideology
ARZA–Masorti (joint)	—	—	4	Liberal Judaism; Reform–Masorti
Mizrachi Australia	—	—	4	Mainstream Orthodox; Religious Zionism
Eretz HaKodesh	—	—	2	Haredi, ultra-Orthodox
Hatikvah Australia	—	—	2	Labour Zionism; Ameinu/Meretz; progressive
Friends of Likud	—	—	1	Likud-aligned; right-wing

Totals: conservatives 7, progressive/liberal 6.

Shift from 2020: conservatives 5 → 7; progressive/liberal 8 → 6.

Overall, conservative slates won 7 mandates to 6 for progressive/liberal slates - a shift from 2020 when the progressive/liberal slates had 8 mandates to 5 for conservatives.

=== South Africa ===
South Africa is allotted a total of 6 seats at the WZO. Elections were not held, instead seats were distributed according to each party's relative membership, by agreement of the parties. The breakdown is as follows:

Slate	Votes	Percentage	Seats	Position / Ideology
Likud South Africa	—	—	2	Right-wing; Likud-aligned
Mizrachi South Africa	—	—	2	Orthodox; Religious Zionism
Arzenu	—	—	1	Reform Judaism; Liberal
South African Friends of Labour Israel / Habonim Dror	—	—	1	Labour Zionism; Progressive

The WZO originally reduced the number of seats to South Africa from 6 to 5 based on the drop in South Africa's Jewish population. This issue was taken to the Zionist Supreme Court, the judicial body of the World Zionist Organization. The ruling from the court was the South Africa would be allowed to keep its 6 seats based on the disproportionate level of Zionist activity in the South African Jewish community.

=== Other countries ===
Delegates from at least 36 other countries were present. They were usually chosen through elections held by each nation's Zionist federation, overseen by a regional election committee.

The Zionist federations in France, Italy, Hungary, Argentina, Brazil, Mexico, and Chile all held elections in 2025 to nominate their delegates. Russia and Ukraine's Jewish communities did not have the option to elect their respective delegates in public elections due to the ongoing Russo-Ukrainian War.

=== Proceedings ===
The congress opened with a moment of silence for those who lost their lives during the October 7 attacks in 2023. With the congress roughly equally divided between the centre-right and centre-left, a compromise had been reached to rotate leadership positions in the World Zionist Organization and the Jewish National Fund. Rabbi Doron Perez, chairman the World Mizrachi religious Zionist movement was to become chair of the World Zionist Organization for two-and-a-half years before being replaced by a member of Yesh Atid, while Yesh Atid MK Meir Cohen would leave the Knesset to serve as chairman of the Jewish National Fund-KKL for two-and-a-half years and then be replaced by a Likud representative.

However, this deal fell apart Yair Netanyahu, son of Israeli prime minister Benjamin Netanyahu, was proposed as head of the WZO's hasbara department. The proposal to appoint Yair Netanyahu was withdrawn and voting for positions was extended into November with voting on a new proposal to rotate the WZO chairmanship between Rabbi Doron Perez and incumbent WZO chairman Yaakov Hagoel.

The congress passed a resolution by 302-235 vote, urging the Israeli government to withdraw a proposed law that would impose an 80% tax on foreign government donations to Israeli human rights NGOs. Another resolution passed which would block WZO funding to any settlements established in the future in the Gaza Strip as well as in the disputed E1 segment of the West Bank, and urge the government to halt any new settlements in E1. However, right-wing and Orthodox factions walked out of the Congress before the vote on the E1 resolution was held and argued that it lacked quorum. A resolution also passed calling for “equal opportunity” budgeting for all Jewish denominations, women, and LGBTQ people, but the legitimacy of the vote was also challenged by opponents, who argued the vote was held without proper discussion.

A resolution for “strengthening relations with Christian allies” with educational programs to welcome Christian Zionists to Israel was rejected. Three resolutions on antisemitism, one to combat antisemitism in sports, a second to create a central body to assist local Jewish communities in opposing antisemitism, and a third calling on universities to oppose campus antisemitism passed with overwhelming support.

Also passed was a resolution that called "for the Establishment of a State Commission of Inquiry to Investigate the Events of October 7".

On November 5, 2025, Yesh Atid leader Yair Lapid announced that his party was withdrawing from the World Zionist Organization, accusing the institution of corruption and cronyism. He also said his party will push to nationalize the Keren Kayemeth LeIsrael–Jewish National Fund and bring it under state control and would consider doing the same with other WZO institutions. Lapid also said Yesh Atid was withdrawing from all WZC agreements and would not accept any positions within the organization, saying "Yesh Atid has decided it will not be part of any of the agreements in the Zionist institutions. We will not take jobs, we will not take budgets, we will not take managerial positions, and we will not be part of the deal being stitched together there...We entered politics to fight corruption, not to be part of a system to arrange jobs for the Netanyahu family and the Deri family. We wanted to clean the national institutions of the culture of corruption and political appointments, but it’s not possible. There’s no way to do it, and no one to do it with.”

At the end of November, the WZO's general council ratified a power-sharing agreement for the World Zionist Organization and Jewish National Fund-KKL with an expanded role for the WZO president and an even distribution of positions between the left and right, with the number of portfolios expanding from 14 to 20. Both Yair Netanyahu and representatives of the Otzma Yehudit were excluded from office. Under the agreement, Rabbi Doron Perez of the World Mizrachi movement will serve as president of the WZO, with the position of president being given added power and responsibility, while Yaakov Hagoel of Likud will continue as WZO chairman for 2 and a half years and then be replaced by a member of the pluralistic/liberal bloc, who will be chosen later. At the Jewish National Fund, a representative of the pluralistic/liberal bloc will be chair for the first half of the term followed by a member of Likud. Both individuals will be chosen later.

== See also ==
- World Zionist Congress
