= Yemin Moshe =

Neighborhood of Jerusalem in Jerusalem District, Jerusalem

Coordinates: 31.772°N 35.225°E

Yemin Moshe Hebrew: ימין משה
- Neighborhood of Jerusalem
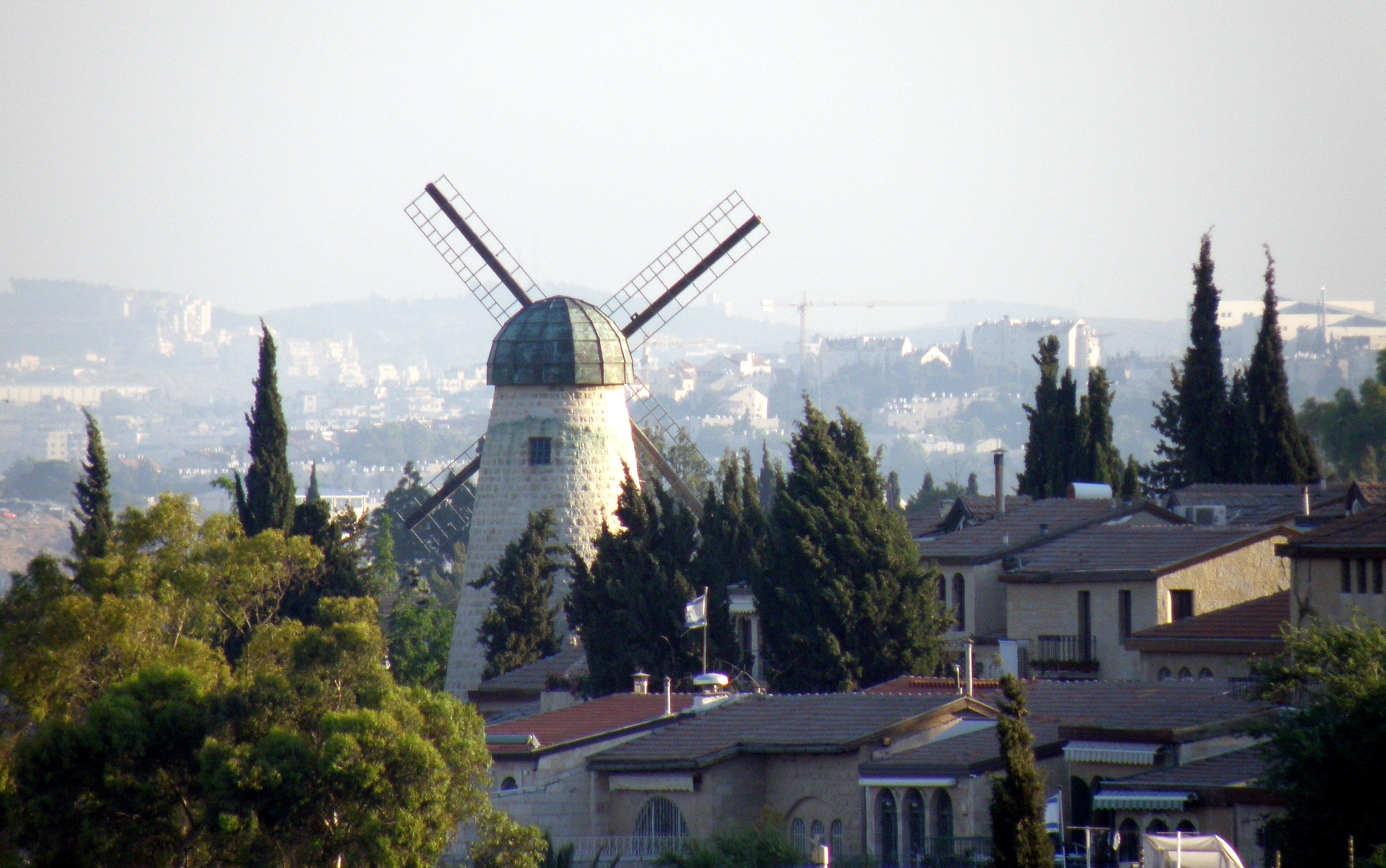
- View of Yemin Moshe
- Interactive map of Yemin Moshe
- Country: Israel
- District: Jerusalem District
- City: Jerusalem
- Founded: 1892–1894
- Founder: Montefiore Welfare Fund

Yemin Moshe (Hebrew: ימין משה "Moses Memorial") is a historic neighborhood in Jerusalem, overlooking the Old City.

== History ==
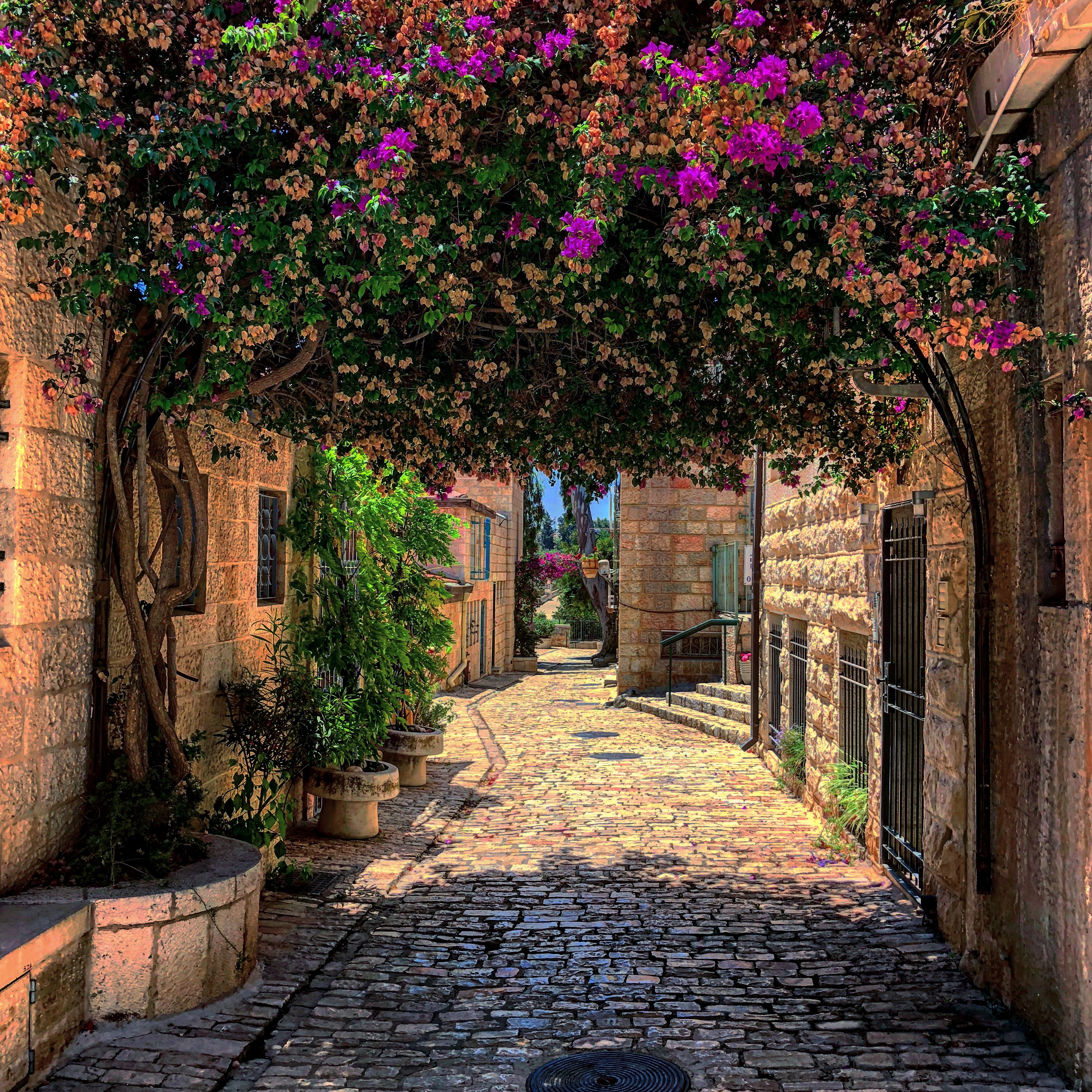
Malki Tsedek Street in Yemin Moshe, lined with bougainvillea flowers

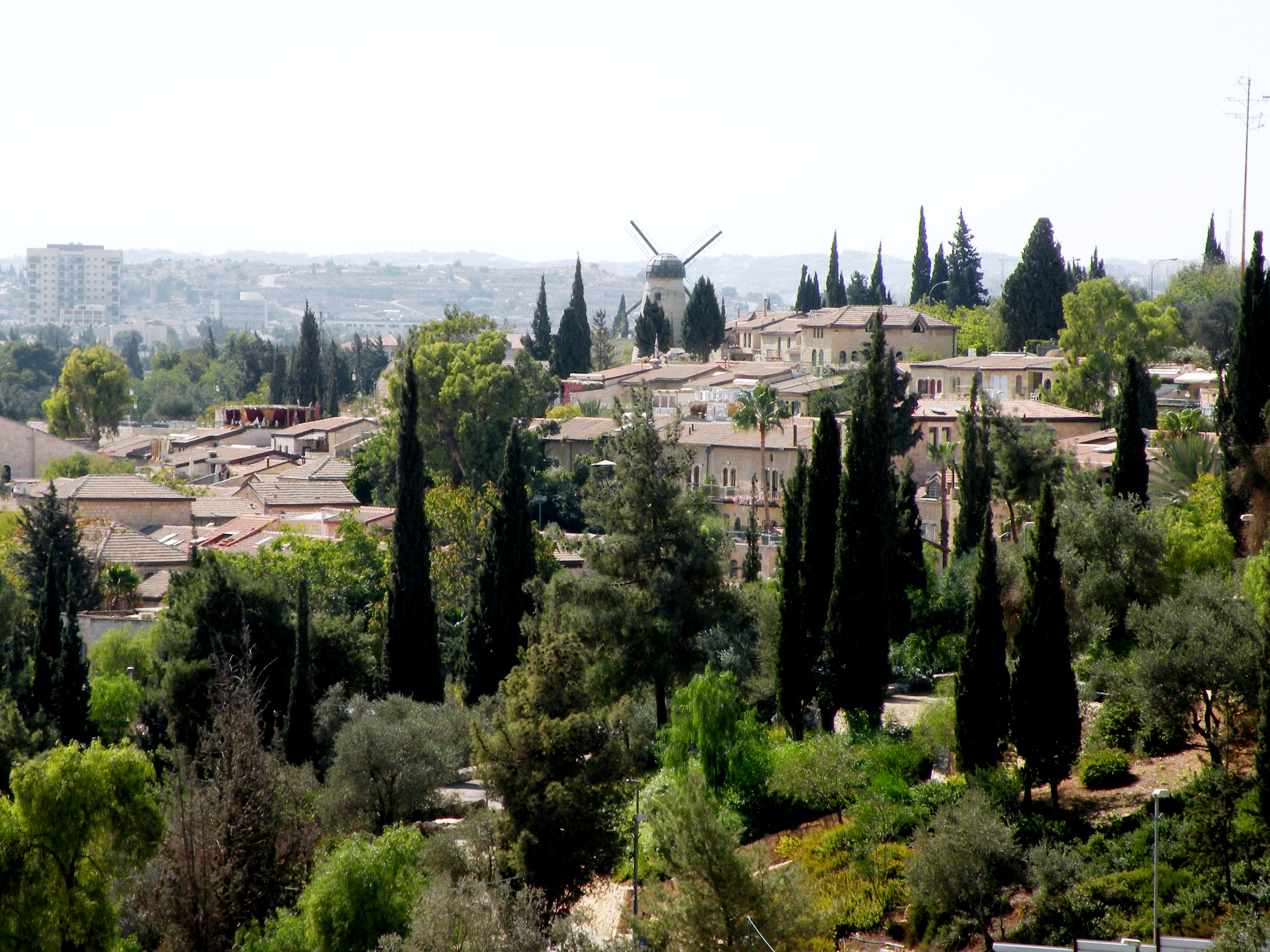
View of Yemin Moshe

Yemin Moshe was established in 1892–1894 by the Montefiore Welfare Fund. Located outside Jerusalem's Old City, it was conceived as a solution to the overcrowding and unsanitary conditions inside the walls. The Fund was continuing the work done by British Jewish banker Moses Montefiore and the new project was meant to mark the seventh year after the philanthropist's death. The name commemorates Montefiore's first name and a verse from the Book of Isaiah (Isaiah 63:11–12).

The land was bought in 1855 by Montefiore with money from the estate of Judah Touro and came to be known as Kerem Moshe VeYehudit, Moses and Judith Vineyard, after Montefiore and his wife.

=== Windmill ===
Montefiore left an indelible mark on the Jerusalem landscape by building in 1857 the windmill in what later became the Yemin Moshe neighbourhood. The windmill became operational in 1860. The idea behind it was weaning the residents from their reliance on the halukka, or charity. Montefiore believed that a mill could provide them with a source of livelihood, but it was only operative for approximately 19 years.

=== Mishkenot Sha'ananim ===
The first housing project, Mishkenot Sha'ananim, consisted of two rows of buildings. Its first houses were completed by 1860 and contained 28 apartments of one-and-a-half rooms. The compound also had a water cistern with an iron pump imported from England, a mikveh and a communal oven. Few people were prepared to live there at the time due to its location outside the city walls, in an area open to Bedouin marauders. Only the poor took up the offer, despite the more hygienic and relatively spacious flats, and the foundation even resorted to paying people in order to persuade them. A wall was built around the houses and the access gate was locked at night. The second row of houses of Mishkenot Sha'ananim was built in 1866 when a cholera epidemic was at its height in the Old City. Some people had taken up residence in the new neighborhood during daytime hours, but had so far refused to stay there at night, however now they fully moved in as illness proved to be a greater menace than night robbers.

=== Yemin Moshe ===
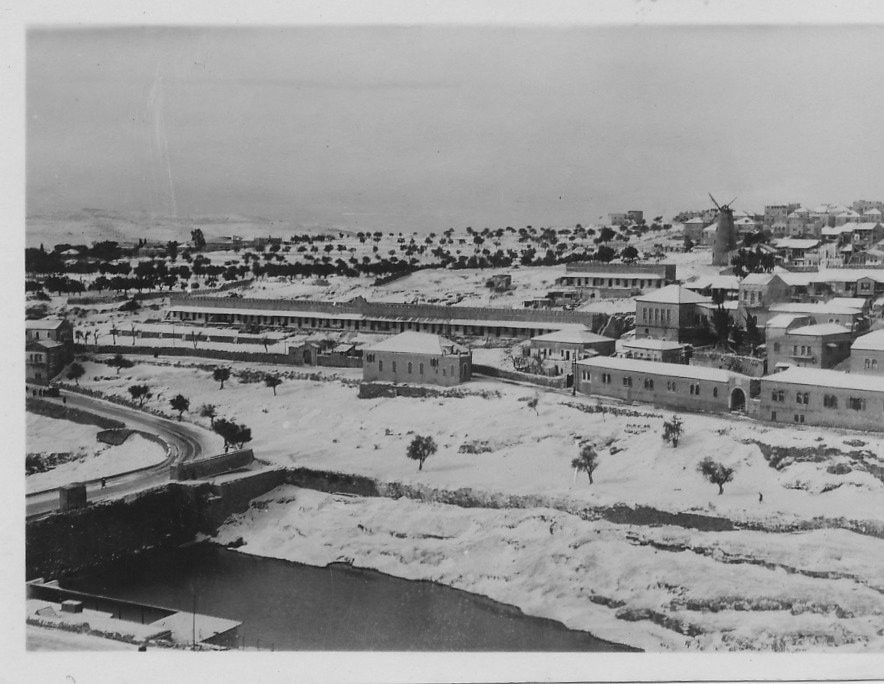
Yemin Moshe in snow c. 1920s

The Yemin Moshe neighbourhood was built in 1892–1894 on the remaining lands around Mishkenot Sha'ananim. Joseph Sebag Montefiore, Moses Montefiore's nephew, signed the agreements which allowed for the construction project on the Kerem Moshe VeYehudit land.

=== Other facilities and projects ===
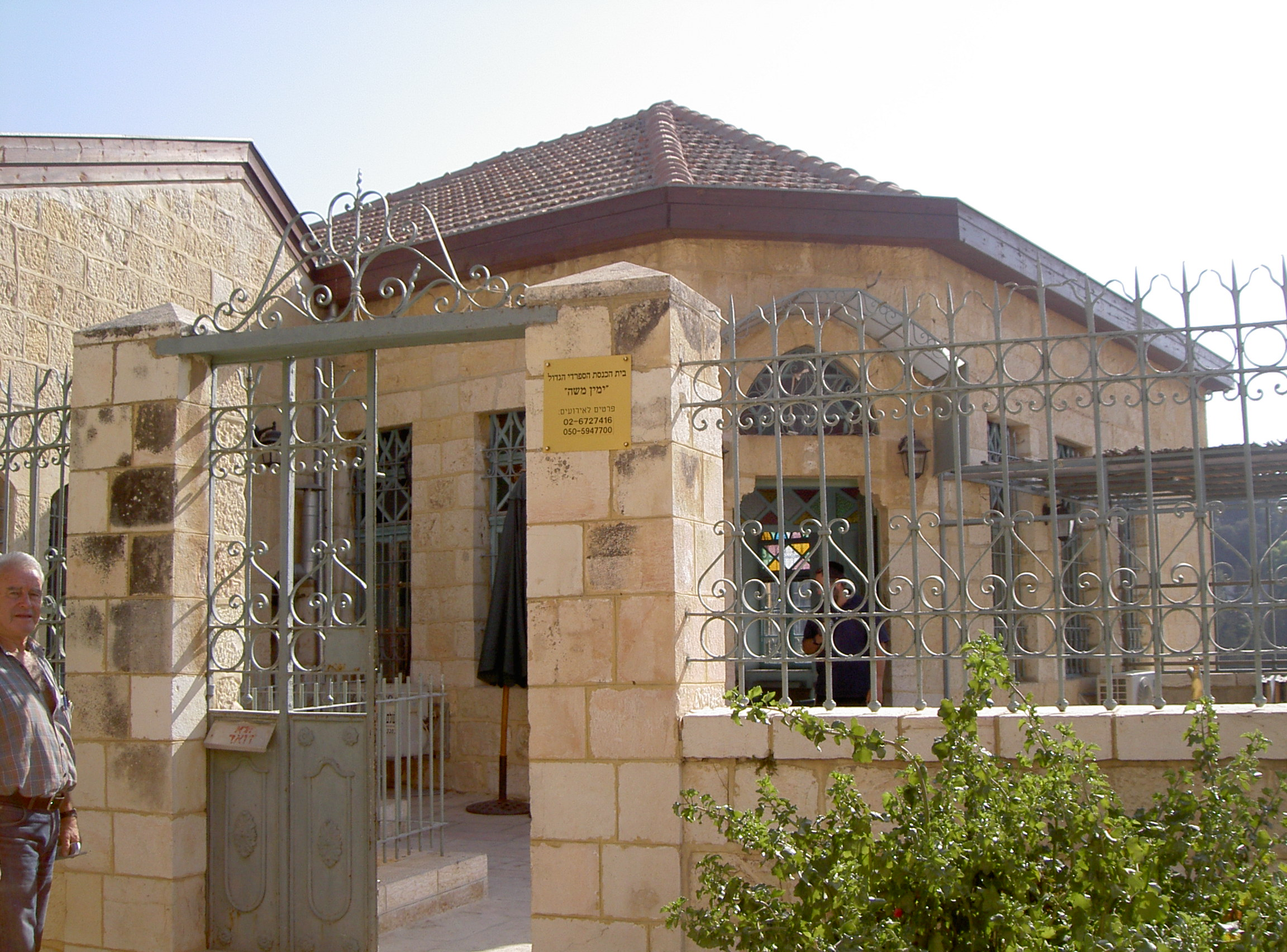
Great Sephardic Synagogue

In addition to the windmill, which was built to allow poor Jews to grind their own flour, Montefiore built a printing press and textile factory, and helped to finance several agricultural colonies. He also attempted to acquire arable land for Jewish cultivation, but was hampered by Ottoman restrictions on land sale to non-Muslims.

A historical building, now named Confederation House after the World Confederation of United Zionists (see Kalman Sultanik article), standing at the back of the King David Hotel and immediately adjacent to Yemin Moshe proper, houses since 1984 a center for ethnic music and poetry.

== Today ==
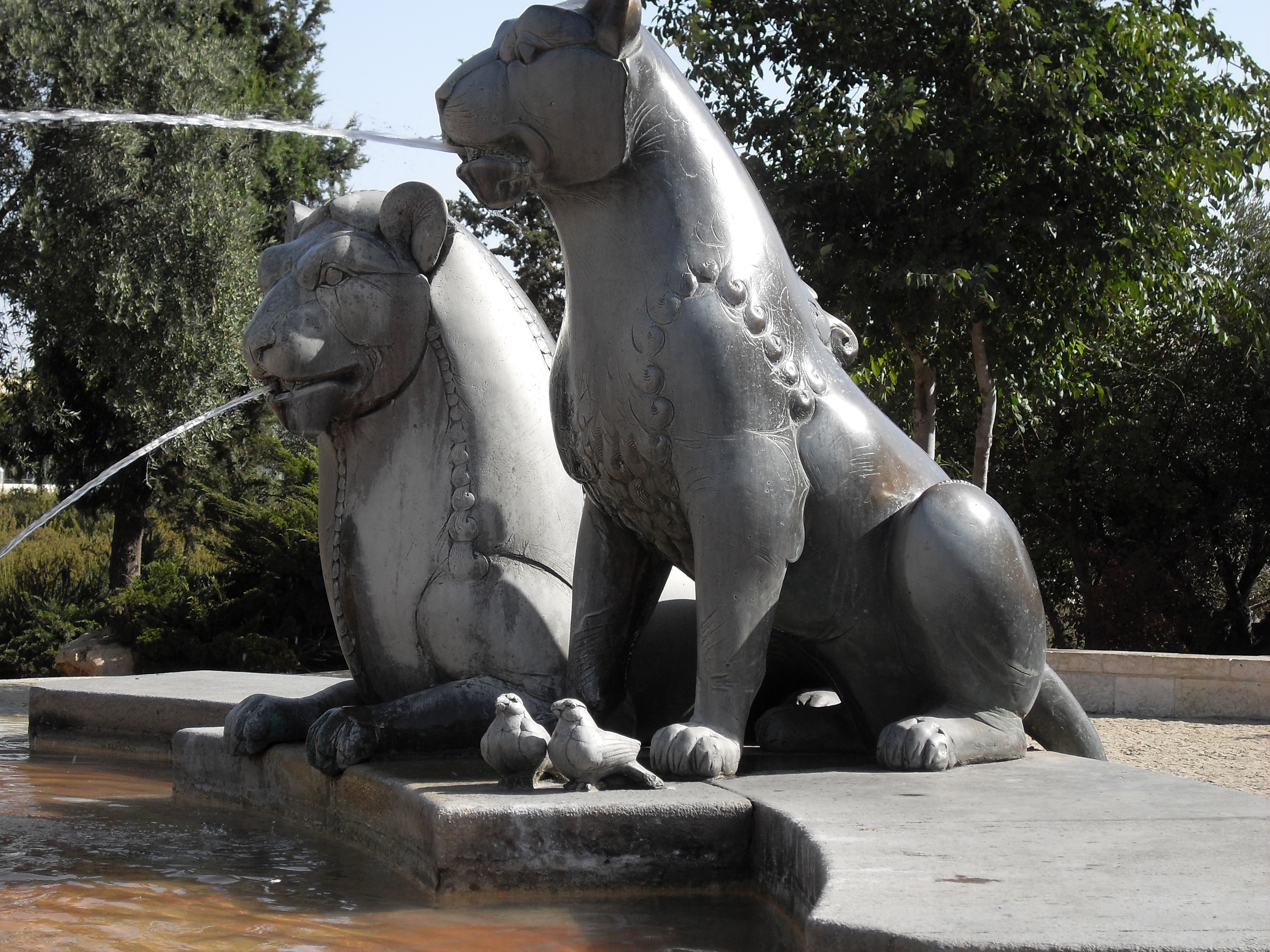
Gardens of Yemin Moshe – Lions Fountain, Jerusalem

Yemin Moshe is an upscale neighborhood surrounded by gardens with a panoramic view of the Old City walls. The Mishkenot Sha'ananim buildings were turned into a cultural center and guesthouse for writers, intellectuals and musicians.

== Notable residents ==
- Daniella Kertesz (born 1989), actress

== See also ==
- Expansion of Jerusalem in the 19th century
- Hutzot Hayotzer, the "Artists' Colony" right next to Yemin Moshe
