= Lion Fountain =

Lion Fountain, Lion's Fountain, Lions Fountain or Lions' Fountain may refer to:

- Lion Fountain, an 11th-century fountain in the Court of the Lions in the Alhambra, Spain
- Lion Fountain, an 18th-century fountain in Floriana, Malta
- Lions Fountain, a 20th-century fountain in Jerusalem, Israel
