= Zionist Organization of Canada =

- Abbreviation: ZOC
- Merged into: Canadian Zionist Federation
- Established: 1899
- Founded at: Montreal, Quebec
- Dissolved: 1978; 48 years ago
- Type: Non-profit
- Headquarters: Montreal (1898–1970); Toronto (1970–1978)
- Location: Canada
- Formerly called: Federation of Zionist Societies of Canada (1898–1921)

The Zionist Organization of Canada was a political and philanthropic organization that acted as the official voice of Zionism in Canada from 1898 until 1978. It was a member of the World Zionist Organization. It was known as the Federation of Zionist Societies of Canada until 1921.

== History ==
The Federation of Zionist Societies of Canada was founded in Montreal in 1898, a year after the First Zionist Congress was held in Basel, with Clarence I. de Sola as its first president. It held its first general meeting in November 1899. By 1907, the Federation had chapters in 42 cities and towns across Canada.

The organization changed its name to the Zionist Organization of Canada (ZOC) in 1921. By the 1930s, it was the largest Zionist group in Canada. Until Canadian Jewish Congress was reconstituted in 1934, the ZOC also acted as a representative organization for Canadian Jewry.

The ZOC ran regular programming and published a periodical, The Canadian Zionist. It fundraised for the Keren Hayesod, the Jewish National Fund, and the United Israel Appeal. The ZOC also oversaw organizations like Canadian Hadassah-WIZO and Young Judaea.

The ZOC moved to Toronto in 1970. It was dissolved in 1978, and its functions were absorbed by the Canadian Zionist Federation.

== Presidents ==
- Clarence I. de Sola (1899–1919)
- Archibald Jacob Freiman (1919–1944)
- Samuel J. Zacks (1946–1952)
- Edward E. Gelber (1952–1956)
- Michael Garber (1956–1958)
- Lawrence Freiman (1958–1962)
- Joseph N. Frank (1962–1964)
- Daniel Monson (?–1975)
- David Monson (1975–?)
