= Twenty-third Zionist Congress =

Twenty Third Zionist Congress
- Part of World Zionist Congress
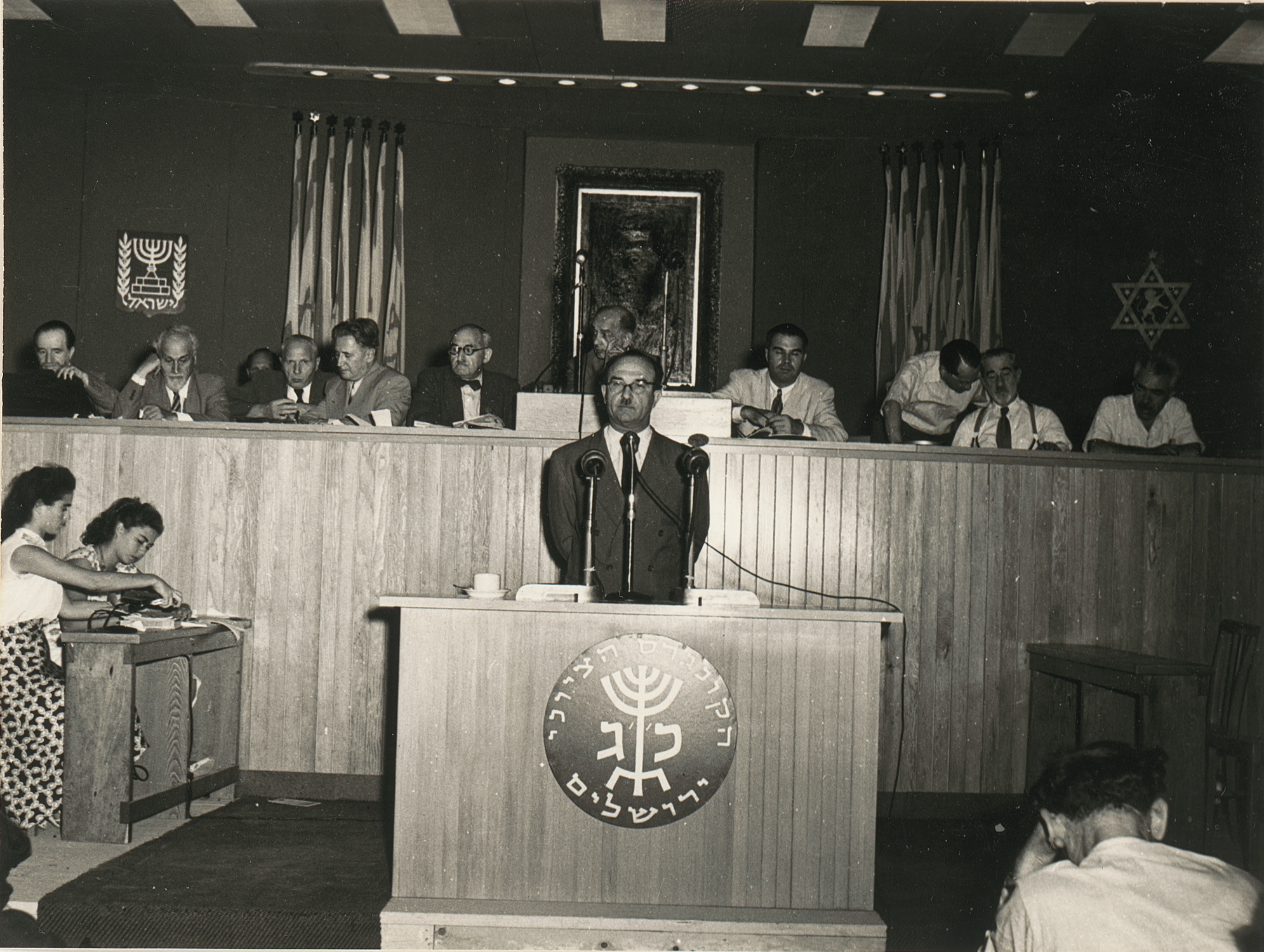
- Levi Eshkol speaking at the congress
- Native name: הקונגרס הציוני הכ"ג
- Date: August 14–30, 1951
- Duration: 16 days
- Location: Jerusalem, Israel
- Type: Political Conference
- Participants: 438

The Twenty-third Zionist Congress was held in Jerusalem from August 14 to 30, 1951. It was the first World Zionist Congress to convene following the 1948 establishment of the State of Israel, marking a significant transition in the movement's focus from the struggle for statehood to the challenges of nation-building, immigration, and the formalization of the relationship between the State of Israel and the World Zionist Organization.

== Opening ==
The 23rd Zionist Congress was held Jerusalem in 1951 and was both the first to be held after the establishment of the State of Israel, and the first held in Jerusalem, which would eventually become the standard location. Including 724 delegates, it was opened at the grave of Theodor Herzl, which recently had been moved from Vienna to Mount Herzl.

== Agenda ==
=== The Goals of the Zionist Movement ===
In a vote of 286-0 with 152 abstentions the congress voted adopted the First Jerusalem Program which defined the goals of the Zionist movement as:

1. The strengthening of the State of Israel.
2. The ingathering of the exiles in the Land of Israel (Kibbutz Galuyot).
3. The fostering of the unity of the Jewish people.

This resolution was the result of compromise, proposed by Nahun Golomann, between two different factions. The Revisionist Zionists, Herut party delegates, and Mapam party delegates supported a maximalist position which called for the tasks of the Zionist movement to the return of all Jews to Israel. While delegates from America and the British Commonwealth regardless of political affiliations called for the "ingathering of the exiles" because these delegates did not see their communities as in exile and the more vague wording gave the Jewish communities from America and the British Commonwealth more space to avoid any calls to return to Israel.

Yitzhak Gruenbaum was the leader of the Maximalist faction and reacted very negatively to the resolutions adoption. He said that it was a "cancellation" of Zionism and argued that if the majority of Jews continued to live outside of Israel then Zionism had not truly been successful.

=== Israel–American Diaspora relations ===
The Congress highlighted significant tensions between Israeli delegates and American Zionist representatives. According to a 1951 report prepared by Eliezer Greenberg for the American Jewish Committee (AJC), Israeli delegates pressured American Jews to emigrate to Israel, a demand the report criticized as dismissive of the status of American Jews.

Greenberg reported that Israeli delegates argued that Jewish life outside of Israel was not only inherently precarious, regardless of the political or social rights enjoyed in the Diaspora, but also a betrayal of the Zionist movement. Israeli representatives pressured American Zionist organizations to prioritize mass emigration to Israel, citing the state's need for Western-educated professionals and skilled labor to support its nation-building efforts.

American delegates at the Congress rejected these characterizations. They argued that American Jews had provided substantial support to the Zionist movement and maintained that the expectation of mass emigration from the United States was impractical and based on a limited understanding of Western Jewish life. While American Zionists remained committed to the goal of kibbutz galuyot (ingathering of exiles), they resisted the pressure to facilitate large-scale emigration from the United States, viewing it as a misunderstanding of their role and stability as a community.

=== Foreign Affairs ===
The congress passed a series of resolutions related to foreign policy: They passed a resolution which called for the Soviet Union to release Zionist prisoners, they passed a resolution calling for the same in Communist Romania, they passed a resolution calling for the Hungarian government to permit emigration to Israel for Jews in Hungary, they passed a resolution condemning the persecution of Jews in Iraq and called on the international community to try and protect the Iraqi Jews, they passed a resolution reaffirming German responsibility for the Holocaust and condemning Holocaust denial, and they passed a resolution supporting German reparations to Holocaust survivors as well as the return of stolen Jewish property.

=== WZO–Israel Relations ===
The Congress passed as resolution which states that Israel should coordinate closely with the WZO on activities involving Jewish communities abroad, that Israel must consult with the WZO and the Jewish Agency before passing laws affecting them, that the WZO and Jewish Agency must be authorized to operate in Israel within limits set by agreements with the government, that a joint coordination board will oversee and align these activities with the Israeli government. The resolution also states that the main responsibilities of the WZO in Israel should be:

- Organizing and facilitating Jewish immigration
- Helping absorb new immigrants
- Supporting youth immigration programs
- Developing agriculture and settlements
- Managing land acquisition and development
- Assisting in broader national development projects

=== Budget ===
The Congress allocated a 74,000,000 Pound Sterling budget to the Executive of the Jewish Agency, Jewish National Fund, and Keren Hayesod, the Congress did not directly assign this budget but instead tasked the Israeli government and the Jewish Agency executive to do so.

=== World Zionist Executive Elections ===
As part of the Congress elections were held for World Zionist Organization's executive body.

| Delegation | Member | Party |
|---|---|---|
| Jerusalem | Berl Locker (Delegation Head) | N/A |
| Jerusalem | Eliyahu Dobkin | Mapai |
| Jerusalem | George Josephtal | Mapai |
| Jerusalem | Levi Eshkol | Mapai |
| Jerusalem | Melech Noy | Mapai |
| Jerusalem | Zalman Shazar | Mapai |
| Jerusalem | Nahum Mir | Mapam |
| Jerusalem | Yehuda Braginsky | Mapam |
| Jerusalem | Moshe Kol | Progressive |
| Jerusalem | Zvi Herman | Progressive |
| Jerusalem | Rabbi Wolf Gold | Mizrachi |
| Jerusalem | Itzhak Raphael | Hapoel Hamizrachi |
| America | Nahum Goldman (Delegation Head) | N/A |
| America | Benjamin Browdy | General Zionists |
| America | Dr. Israel Goldstein | General Zionists |
| America | Baruch Zuckerman | Labour Zionists |
| America | Hayim Greenberg | Labour Zionists |
| America | Rose Halprin | Hadassah |
| America | Zvi Lurie | Mapam |

== Notable Participants ==
| Name | Image | Known For | Role in Congress |
|---|---|---|---|
| Berl Locker | | Zionist activist and Israeli politician | Elected leader of the Jerusalem Delegation |
| Israel Goldstein | | American-born Israeli rabbi, author and Zionist leader | Important leader of the American delegation |
| Nahum Goldman | | A founder of the World Jewish Congress and its president from 1951 to 1978 also president of the World Zionist Organization from 1956 to 1968 | Elected leader of the American Delegation |
| Yitzchak Gruenbaum | | Polish and Israeli politician | Leader of the Maximalist faction |
