= 37th World Zionist Congress =

37th World Zionist Congress הקונגרס הציוני העולמי ה-37
- Begins: October 20, 2015
- Ends: October 22, 2015
- Frequency: every five years
- Location: Jerusalem
- Inaugurated: 1897
- Previous event: 2010
- Next event: 2020 (38th)
- Participants: 509
- Organizer: World Zionist Organization

The 37th World Zionist Congress (Hebrew: הקונגרס הציוני העולמי ה-37) was held in Jerusalem, from October 20–22, 2015.

Israeli Prime Minister Benjamin Netanyahu addressed the Congress on its opening day.

== 2015 United States elections for World Zionist Congress ==
In the elections to determine the 145 seats allocated to U.S. delegates, the Reform movement's ARZA faction won the plurality with 56 seats, followed by the Conservative movement's Mercaz faction with 25 seats and the modern Orthodox religious Zionist faction Mizrachi with 24 seats. Several other slates won between 1 and 10 seats each (see below).

The United States 145 delegates to the 2015 Congress were chosen from 11 slates (including two newly qualified) that competed in elections held during January 13 through April 30, 2015. Total number of seats won are shown in parentheses after the list name and description:

The U.S. slates (parties) included:

- Alliance for New Zionist Vision (2 delegates)
- American Forum for Israel (American Forum Of Russian Speaking Jewry) "The Home for Russian American Jews for Israel" (10 delegates)
- ARZA: "Representing Reform Judaism" (56 delegates)
- Green Israel: Aytzim / Green Zionist Alliance / Jewcology (1 delegate)
- HATIKVAH - "The Progressive Zionist Voice" - a joint slate of Ameinu, Partners for Progressive Israel, Habonim Dror and Hashomer Hatzair, that includes individuals who are lay-activists and staff people associated with such groups as J Street, New Israel Fund, Americans for Peace Now, Open Hillel, Partners for Progressive Israel, and the Jewish Labor Committee. (Affiliated with Labor and Meretz) (8 delegates)
- Herut North America - "The Jabotinsky Movement" (1 delegate)
- Mercaz USA: "The Zionist Arm of the Conservative Movement" (25 delegates)
- Ohavei Zion - World Sephardic Zionist Organization (Affiliated with Shas) (4 delegates)
- Religious Zionists: "Vote Torah for the Soul of Israel" - Religious Zionists of America, AMIT, Bnei Akiva, Torah MiTzion, Orthodox Union, Yeshiva University, Touro College, RCA, Young Israel (24 delegates)
- Zionist Organization of America (ZOA) - "Defend Jews & Israeli Rights", endorsed by World Likud, AFSI, JCCWatch, APT, Stand With Us and One Israel Fund (7 delegates)
- Zionist Spring: "Restoring Vision to World Zionism" (Bnai Zion Foundation, Young Judea, World Confederation of United Zionists) (7 delegates)

Some of the older and larger American Zionist groups, such as Hadassah and Emunah, do not run and are automatically assigned seats.
