= Basel Program =

Ideological platform of the Zionist movement

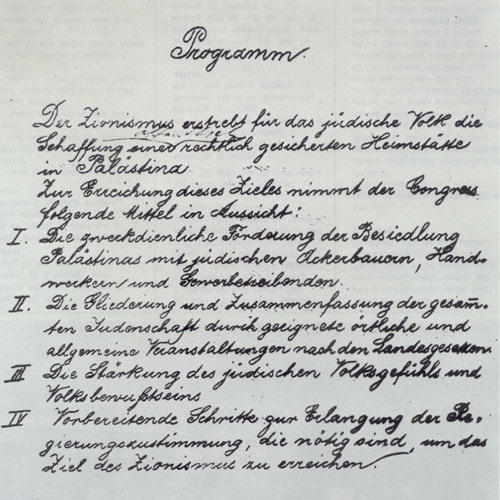
The original "Basel Program", as agreed at the conference. The indicated amendment changes "by law" to "by public law".

The Basel Program was the first manifesto of the Zionist movement, drafted between 27 and 30 August 1897 and adopted unanimously at the First Zionist Congress in Basel, Switzerland, on 30 August 1897.

In 1951, it was replaced by the Jerusalem Program.

== History ==
The Basel Program was drafted by a committee elected on Sunday 29 August 1897 comprising Max Nordau (heading the committee), Nathan Birnbaum, Alexander Mintz, Siegmund Rosenberg, Saul Rafael Landau, together with Hermann Schapira and Max Bodenheimer who were added to the committee on the basis of them having both drafted previous similar programs (including the "Kölner Thesen").

The seven-man committee prepared the Program over three drafting meetings.

== Goals ==
The program set out the goals of the Zionist movement as follows:

Zionism seeks to establish a home in Palestine for the Jewish people, secured under public law.

To achieve this goal, the Congress envisages the following means:

1. The expedient promotion of the settlement of Jewish agriculturists, artisans, and tradesmen in Palestine.

2. The organization and bringing together of all Jews through local and general events, according to the laws of the various countries.

3. The strengthening of Jewish feeling and national consciousness.

4. Preparatory steps for obtaining the governmental approval which is necessary to the achievement of the Zionist purpose.

== Bibliography ==
- Jubilee Publication (1947). The Jubilee of the first Zionist Congress, 1897-1947. Jerusalem: Executive of the Zionist Organisation. pp. 108 pages, 2 leaves of plates. Published simultaneously in Hebrew, French, Spanish and Yiddish
- Epstein, Lawrence J. (14 January 2016), The Dream of Zion: The Story of the First Zionist Congress, Rowman & Littlefield, ISBN 978-1-4422-5467-1
- Bodenheimer, Max (1963). Prelude to Israel: The Memoirs of M. I. Bodenheimer. T. Yoseloff.
