= Kalman Sultanik =

Zionist Leader

- Born: April 12, 1917
- Died: October 14, 2014 (aged 97)
- Education: La Salle Extension University
- Title: Head of the World Confederation of United Zionists Chairman of the World Zionist Organization American Section
- Awards: Commander’s Cross of the Order of Polonia Restituta

Kalman Sultanik (April 12, 1917 – October 14, 2014) was a prominent Zionist figure who was active in numerous Jewish and Zionist organizations throughout his life. He was a member of the United States Holocaust Memorial Council, served on the Executive Committee of the Jewish Agency for Israel and became vice president of the World Jewish Congress as well as chairman of the World Zionist Organization American Section. He founded the Jerusalem Confederation House and led the World Confederation of United Zionists for decades. Sultanik was also active in assisting the Polish community of Holocaust survivors.

== Biography ==
Sultanik was born in Miechów, Poland, on April 12, 1917. During the Second World War he participated in the underground resistance movement against the Nazis before being held in the Płaszów concentration camp in German-occupied Poland and, later, a camp in Dresden, Germany. From there he was forced on a death march to Theresienstadt.

Following his liberation in 1945, Sultanik served as a representative of Holocaust survivors in displaced persons camps at the twenty-second World Zionist Congress held in Basel, Switzerland in 1946. In 1949, he became secretary general of the World Confederation of General Zionists and in 1977 he was elected as vice president of the World Jewish Congress. In 1981, while serving as co-chair of the Ronald S. Lauder Foundation’s International Auschwitz-Birkenau Preservation Committee along with Auschwitz survivor Ernest Michel, Sultanik organized an assembly of ten thousand Holocaust survivors in Jerusalem aimed at advancing a project to preserve Auschwitz. In 1988, Sultanik served as deputy chairman of the International Council of the Auschwitz-Birkenau State Museum as well as chairman and treasurer of the budget and finance committee of the museum. He also helped raise $40 million from governments across Europe to preserve the site.

Subsequently, Sultanik received a law degree from La Salle Extension University in Chicago, Illinois, and also founded the Confederation House in Jerusalem.

He died on October 14, 2014, in New York at age 97.
