= Malka Locker =

Ukrainian-born Israeli poet (1887–1990)

- מלכּה לאָקער
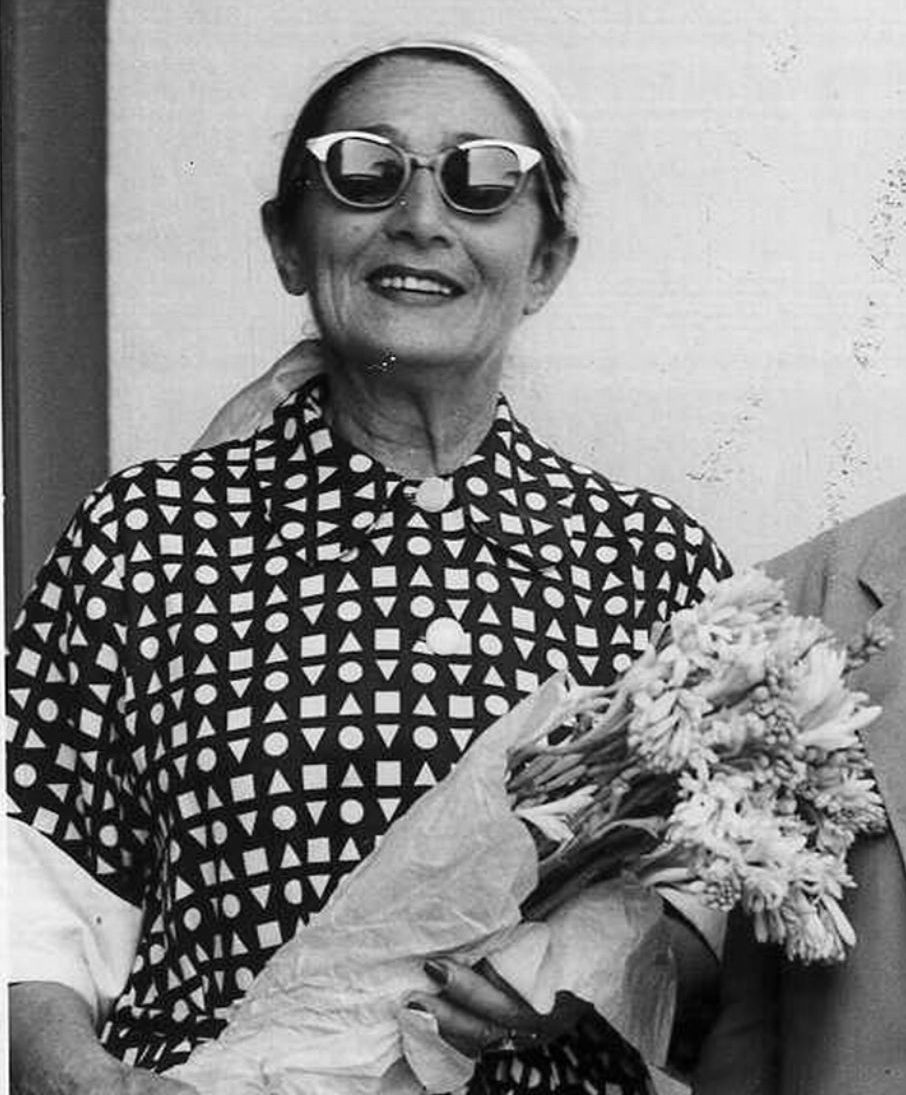
- Malka Locker in the 1950s.
- Born: 1887; Kuty, Kingdom of Galicia and Lodomeria, Austria-Hungary
- Died: 1990 (aged 102–103); Jerusalem
- Occupation: Poet
- Writing career
- Language: Yiddish

Malka Locker (1887–1990; Hebrew: מלכה לוקר; Yiddish: מלכּה לאָקער) was a Ukrainian-born Israeli poet, writing primarily in Yiddish.

== Biography ==
Malka Locker was born in 1887 in Kuty, known in Yiddish as Kitev, a town in what was then the Kingdom of Galicia and Lodomeria, now Ukraine. She came from a long line of rabbis, and education was important to her family, with Malka receiving a secular education as well as a Yiddish one. She went on to learn German, French, and English, as well as Polish, Ukrainian, and Hebrew.

In 1910, she married the Zionist activist Berl Locker, who was her cousin. The couple traveled the world together, spending a decade living in London from 1938 to 1948. They permanently settled in Israel in 1948, having first spent time in then-Mandatory Palestine in the 1930s.

Locker is best known for her work as a poet, but she did not begin writing poetry until she was 42 years old. She began writing on the suggestion of a friend, who had identified a "poetic quality" in her correspondence. As she began to publish poems in the 1930s, her work received some notice from Yiddish critics.

She published at least six books of poetry, beginning with Velt un mentsh ("World and Man") in 1931. Subsequent collections included Du ("You") in 1932; Shtet ("Cities"), about London, in 1942; and The World Is Without a Protector: 1940–1945 in 1947. While she wrote primarily in Yiddish, she also published one book of poems in German, and her writing was also translated into Hebrew and French.

Locker also produced various works of literary criticism, with a focus on French romantic and symbolic poetry, including a 1965 book on Arthur Rimbaud, a 1970 biography of Charles Baudelaire, and a 1976 biography of Paul Verlaine. She was also a composer, notably writing the choral works "Luekh trts"v" and "Luekh trts'kh" in 1938, and would sing in Yiddish locally and internationally.

She died in Jerusalem in 1990, at age 103.
