= Tziki Tzvi Avisar =

Israeli politician

- ציקי צבי אבישר
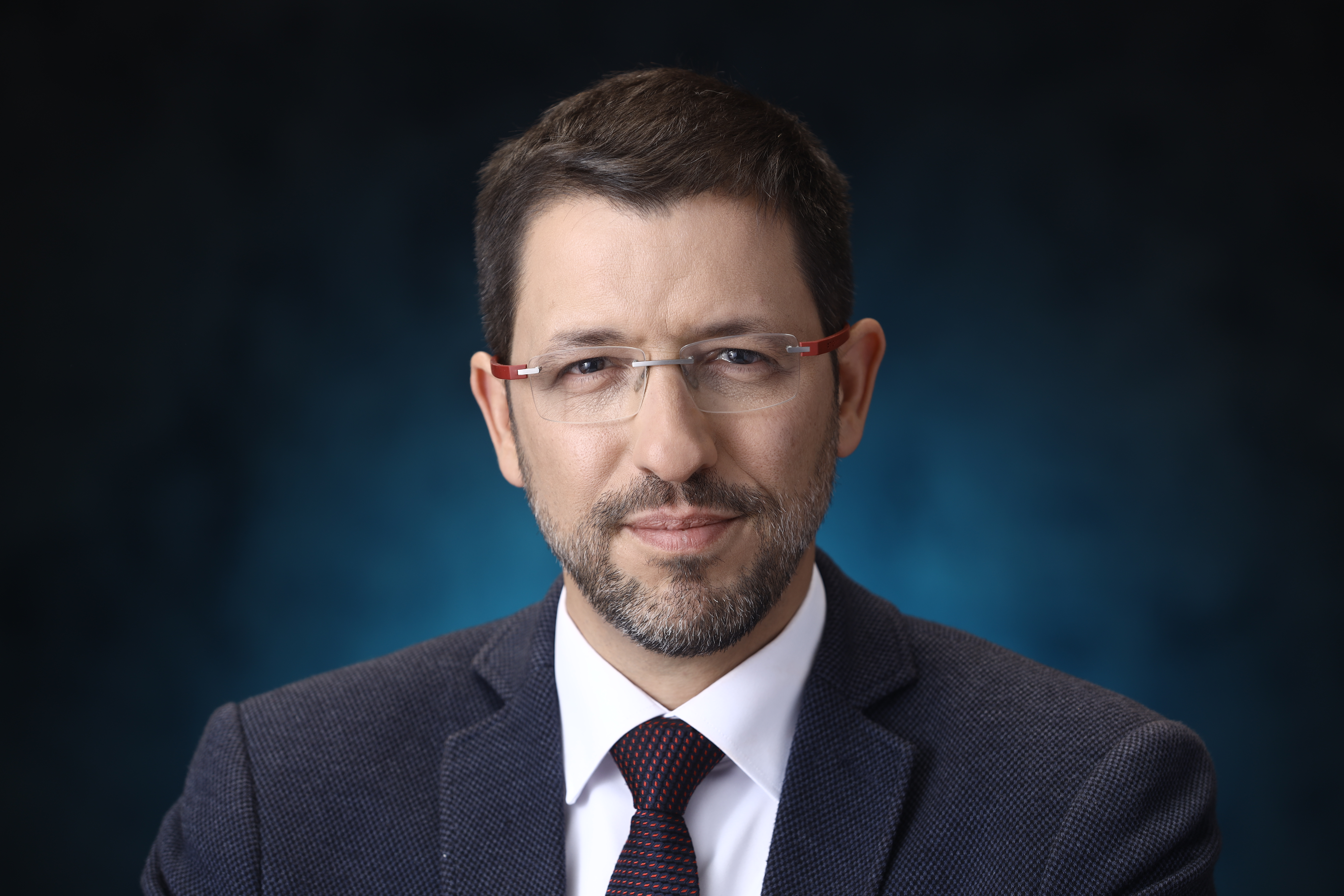
- Born: 16 September 1978 (age 48); Jerusalem, Israel
- Education: Hebrew University
- Occupation: Mayor of Kiryat Motzkin city
- Spouse: Ayelet Avisar (m. 2011)
- Children: 4

Tziki Tzvi Avisar (Hebrew: ציקי (צבי) אבישר; born September 16, 1978) is the Mayor of Kiryat Motzkin; founder and former chairman of Over The Rainbow – the Zionist movement, a World Zionist Congress faction.

== Biography ==
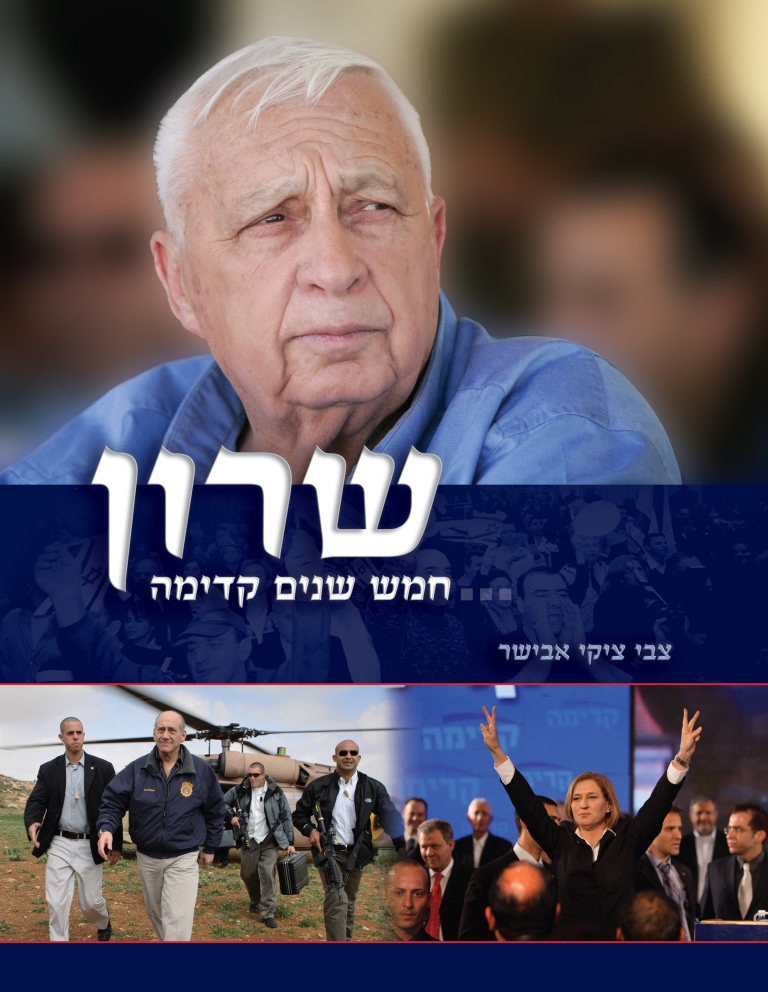
Book cover of Sharon Five years forward, March 2011

Tziki Avisar was born in Jerusalem.

Avisar studied at Goldwater College in Eilat and was an active leader in the Likud Youth.

Avisar pursued studies in Middle Eastern studies and urban geography at the Hebrew University of Jerusalem. Concurrently, he began his career in the Israeli Navy, serving as a combatant and later as a commander of patrol ships in various arenas, including the Red Sea, Gaza, and Lebanon. He also received training as a combat paramedic during his military service.

While studying, Avisar entered the realm of public service, serving as the director of the Intelligence Division of the Supreme Court from 2001 to 2004. In this role, he was responsible for assessing threats and risks to the security of Supreme Court justices.

From 2004 to 2009, Avisar served as a professional advisor to various government ministries, including Internal Security, Absorption, Industry, Trade, and Labour. During this time, he also founded SkyTech Software House, a company specializing in software development for academic institutions and major corporations.

In 2005, Avisar played a key role in managing the election campaign team of former Prime Minister Ariel Sharon, focusing on internet content management. He later (2011) authored the book Sharon, Five Years Forward (Hebrew), which covered the transformation in Sharon's political thinking when he made the decision to establish a new centrist party and the events taking shape after Sharon's debilitating stroke in January 2006.

In 2011, Avisar founded the "Young Academy," an educational center aimed at enriching exact sciences education for adolescents. The academy operates independently, providing specialized educational programs.

Avisar also established the Department of Information Systems and Communication in the municipality of Kiryat Motzkin in 2011, adapting municipal services to modern technological standards.

In 2014, Avisar founded Over The Rainbow, a global Zionist movement operating in 14 countries, aimed at strengthening Jewish communities and combating anti-Semitism.

He also established the "New Spirit in Motzkin" movement, which advocates for strengthening the municipal education system, urban renewal, proper administration, and providing assistance to senior citizens. The movement fosters a sense of community pride in Kiryat Motzkin by striving for progress and improvement in various aspects of local life.

In the 2018 municipal elections, Avisar's faction won 5 seats on the Kiryat Motzkin city council, becoming the largest opposition faction. In 2024, Avisar was elected mayor of Kiryat Motzkin, with his faction winning 7 seats on the city council.

Avisar holds a bachelor's degree in Middle Eastern studies and urban geography from the Hebrew University and is a certified business administrator from the College of Management. In addition, he holds a civilian pilot's license. He and his wife, Ayelet, are the parents of Yuval, Ron, Alon, and Ray.

== Establishment of Over The Rainbow ==
Avisar's decision to establish Over the Rainbow – the Zionist Movement, was born on the backdrop of observing the reality and the recent demographic tendencies of the Jewish people. The decision mainly rested on studies conducted by demographer Sergio DellaPergola from the Hebrew University of Jerusalem. In a global world, where most Jews do not live in Israel nor have any intention of immigrating to it, Avisar believed that the institutional Zionist Movement should adjust its goals to the present day and be attuned to reality. It means that Zionism can no longer solely be expressed by immigration to Israel or by raising funds to Zionist projects in Israel, but rather by empowering Jewish communities, strengthening their ties to Israel, promoting advocacy for the state of Israel and encouraging them to continue and contribute to their living environment – while advocating collaborations with non-Jewish and even non-Zionist organizations in order to promote dialogue and understanding.

A year after its inception, the organization successfully established a foothold in nine countries and four continents, has contested in the elections for the 37th World Zionist Congress held in Jerusalem in October 2015, and won recognition as a faction with twelve representatives and four observers from around the world.

== Authored books ==
- Sharon - Five years forward. Publisher house. 2011. ISBN 978-96591748-0-5.
