= Twenty-second Zionist Congress =

1946 Zionist congress in Basel

- Congress medal
- Native name: הקונגרס הציוני העשרים ושניים
- Date: 9–24 December 1946
- Location: Basel, Switzerland
- Type: Zionist Congress
- Participants: About 2,500 delegates and guests

The Twenty-second Zionist Congress was a Zionist Congress held in Basel, Switzerland, from 9 to 24 December 1946. Chaim Weizmann presided.

It was the first Zionist Congress held after the Holocaust, and was dominated by it. As a result of the Holocaust, the number of delegates from Eastern European Jewry fell sharply, while the number and influence of American delegates grew. The Revisionists returned to the Zionist Organization after an absence of eleven years. About 2,500 delegates and guests attended, more than at any previous congress. It was the last Zionist Congress held before the establishment of the State of Israel.

== Background ==
The previous congress, the Twenty-first, met in Geneva in August 1939, days before the outbreak of the Second World War. Its president, Menachem Ussishkin, voiced grave concern for the fate of Polish Jewry, and Weizmann closed the congress with the words: "I have no prayer but this; that we will all meet again alive" In the years that followed, the Holocaust exterminated most of European Jewry.

When the congress reconvened in Basel seven years later, the absence of the large European delegations that had attended earlier congresses was devastating, as so much of European Jewry had perished in the Holocaust. Weizmann later described standing before the assembly and running his eye "along row after row of delegates" as "a dreadful experience": "Polish Jewry was missing; Central and Southeast European Jewry was missing; German Jewry was missing." In his view the American delegation, led by Abba Hillel Silver, was the strongest from the outset largely because of the weakness of the rest.

== Opening session ==
The congress opened on 9 December 1946 in the Mustermesse, the largest hall in Basel, before more than 370 delegates from 61 countries and some 2,000 guests and spectators. In his keynote address Weizmann recalled the "fateful August of 1939" in Geneva and told the delegates: "The shadow of tragic bereavement is upon us tonight." Of the murdered Jews of Europe he said that "six million graves testify to the consequences of our homelessness".

The delegates also heard how few Jews remained in Europe and in what conditions. Rabbi Philip S. Bernstein, adviser on Jewish affairs to the American commander in Europe, gave the congress a grim account: some 192,000 Jewish displaced persons were living in camps in the American zone alone, and close to 250,000 in all, including those in the British zone and Italy.

== Composition ==
Elections for the delegates from Mandatory Palestine took place in November 1946. A total of 205,088 people voted; 8,889 ballots were disqualified, leaving 196,189 valid votes.

Party	Ballot letter	Votes	Seats
Mapai	א	68,939	28
Mizrachi	ב	4,299	2
United Revisionist Zionist Union	ג	26,964	11
Yemenite Association	ה	1,640	1
Hapoel HaMizrachi	ו	19,176	8
HaOved HaTzioni	ח	3,445	1
Am Movement (Tnuat HaAm)	כ	699	–
Maccabi	כב	1,321	–
Yemenite Workers	לא	297	(Note: Surplus-vote agreement with Ahdut HaAvoda.)
HaOved HaDati	לג	906	(Note: Surplus-vote agreement with Mapai.)
Mizrachi Women	נב	933	(Note: Surplus-vote agreement with Mizrachi.)
Aliyah Hadasha	ע	12,055	5
General Zionists	צ	7,616	3
Hashomer Hatzair	ש	23,944	10
Ahdut HaAvoda	ת	24,049	10
Total		205,088	79
