= Kiryat Motzkin =

Kiryat Motzkin קִרְיַת מוֹצְקִין
- City

Hebrew transcription(s)
  - ISO 259: Qiryat Móçqin (Motzkin)
  - Also spelled: Kiryat Motzkin (unofficial)
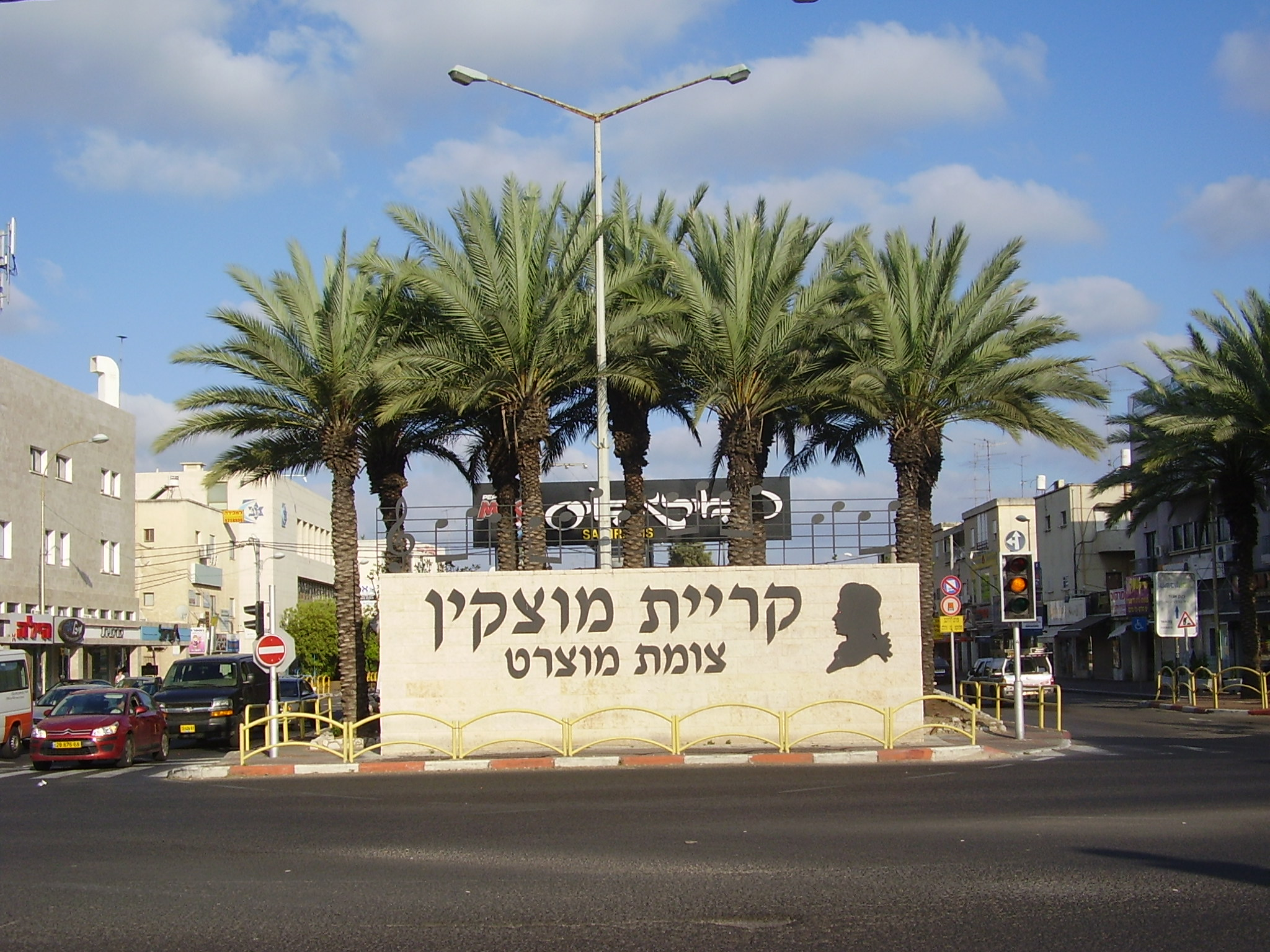
- Mozart Junction in Kiryat Motzkin

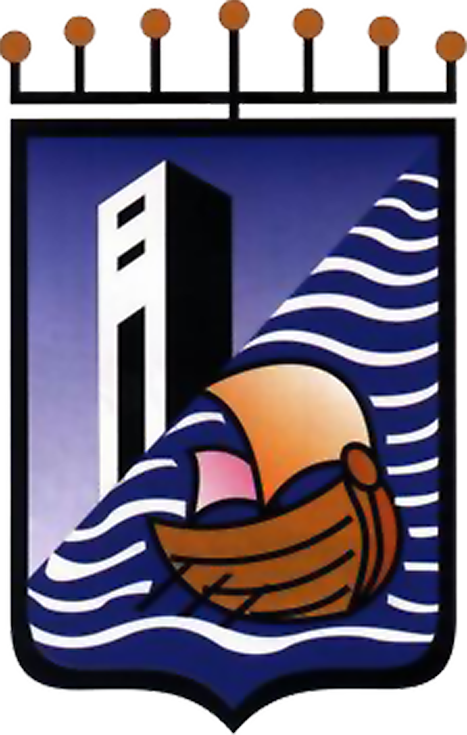

- Location within Haifa region of Israel Location within Israel
- Coordinates: 32°50′N 35°05′E
- Country: Israel
- District: Haifa
- Subdistrict: Haifa
- Founded: 1934

Government
  - Mayor: Tziki Tzvi Avisar (Ind.)

Area
  - Total: 3,778 dunams (3.778 km^{2}; 1.459 sq mi)

Population (2024)
  - Total: 51,488
  - Density: 13,630/km^{2} (35,300/sq mi)
- 55,600 (September 2024, unofficial)

Ethnicity
  - Jews and others: 99.9%
  - Arabs: 0.1%
- Website: www.motzkin.co.il

Kiryat Motzkin (Hebrew: קִרְיַת מוֹצְקִין, Arabic: كريات موتسكين) is a city in the Haifa District of Israel, 8 kilometres (5 miles) north of the city center of Haifa. According to the Israel Central Bureau of Statistics, in 2024 it had a population of 51,488. However, as of September 2024, the unofficial population count is 55,600, reflecting significant growth not yet captured in official statistics. The city is named after Leo Motzkin (1867-1933), one of the organizers of the First Zionist Congress in 1897. The mayor of the city is Tziki Tzvi Avisar.

== History ==
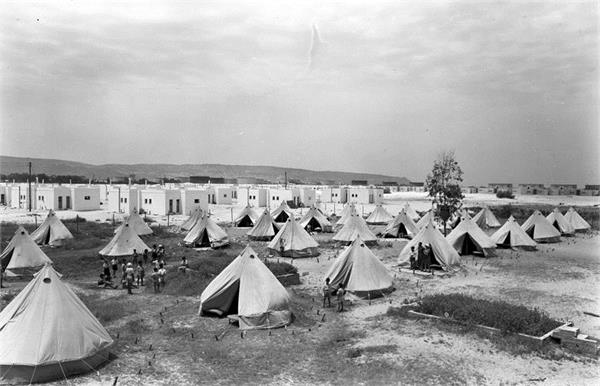
Immigrant camp between Kiryat Motzkin & Kiryat Haim 1946

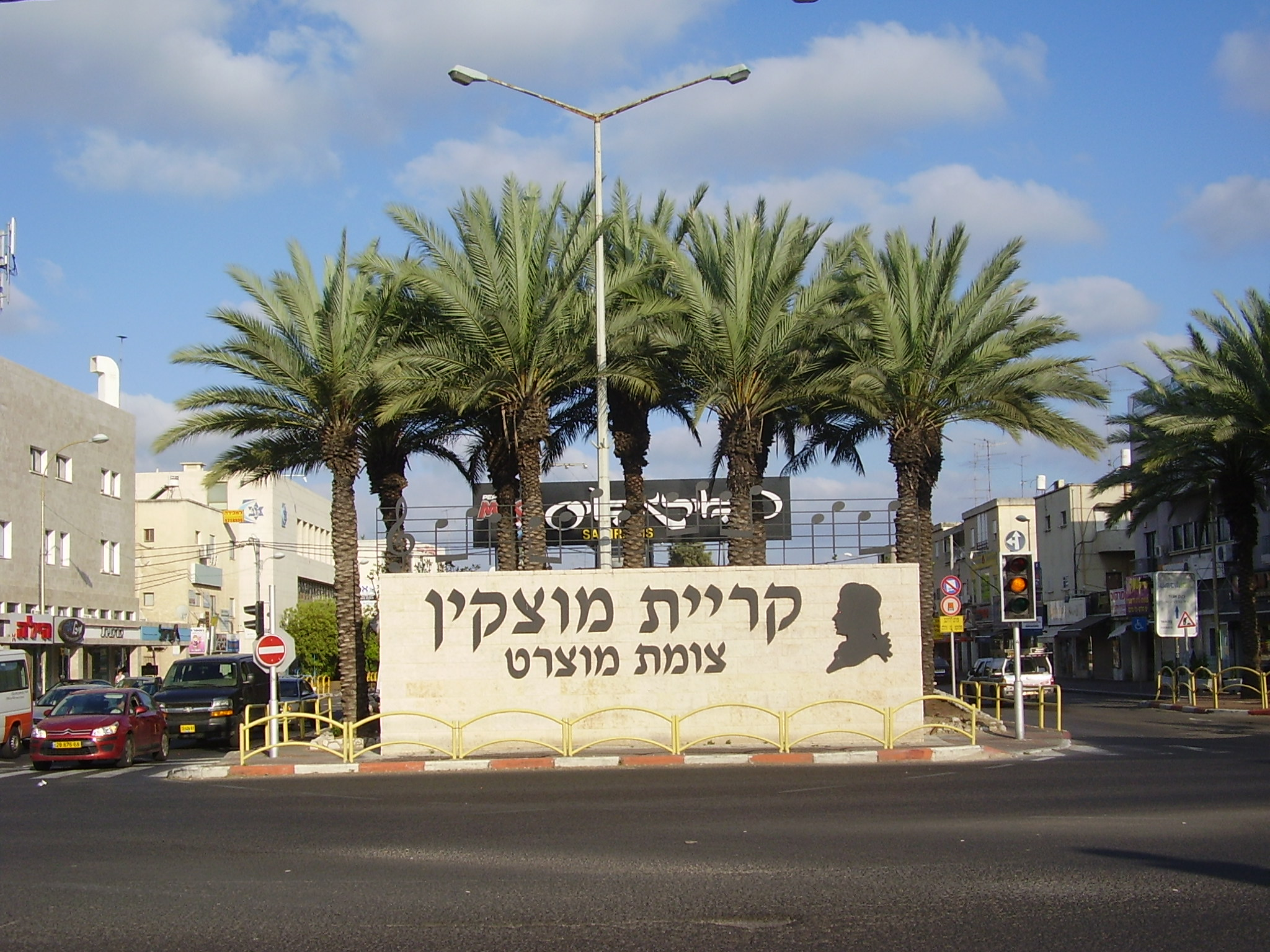
Mozart Junction in Kiryat Motzkin

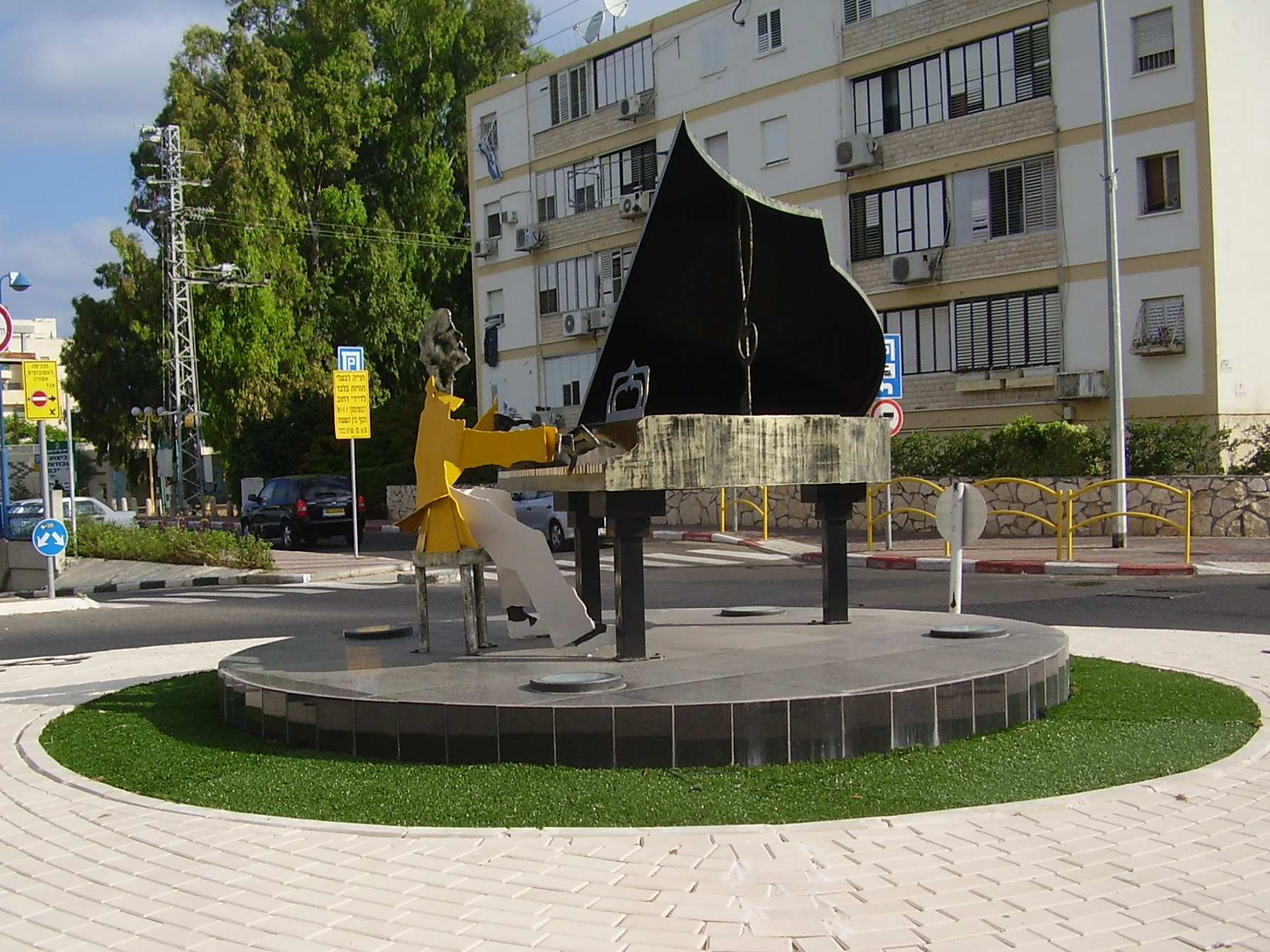
Pianist Square in Kiryat Motzkin

Kiryat Motzkin was founded in 1934, and by 1935 the first school was opened. In 1939, the town had a population of about 2,000 and 345 buildings. Kiryat Motzkin railway station was constructed by British Mandatory Palestine in 1937. In the Second World War, Kiryat Motzkin suffered from German\Italian air bombarding. It received local council status in 1940. During the 1947–48 Civil War in Mandatory Palestine, an important battle took place near Kiryat Motzkin when the Haganah destroyed an Arab arms convoy and killed the commander of Arab forces in the process. This contributed to the Jewish victory in the Battle of Haifa.

== Demographics ==
Historical population
Year	Pop.	±%
1972	17,600	—
1983	26,400	+50.0%
1995	33,700	+27.7%
2008	38,100	+13.1%
2022	49,057	+28.8%
2024	51,488	+5.0%

Kiryat Motzkin has experienced significant immigration waves throughout its history, contributing to its diverse population. Approximately 40% of the city's residents are immigrants from the former Soviet Union or their descendants, significantly influencing the city's cultural landscape. According to the Israeli Interior Ministry, in 2024 the ethnic makeup of the city was predominantly Jewish and other non-Arabs. There were 25,000 males and 28,000 females, with 25.5% of the population 19 years of age or younger, 15.2% between 20 and 29, 19.0% between 30 and 44, 20.1% from 45 to 59, 4.5% from 60 to 64, and 15.9% 65 years of age or older. The city has been experiencing positive migration, with more people moving in than out. This trend is attributed to the city's reputation as a safe, quiet, and comfortable place to live. The socio-economic status of Kiryat Motzkin's residents is considered high within the Haifa metropolitan area. On a scale of 1 to 10 (with 10 being the highest), the city's population ranks 7, indicating a relatively affluent community.

== Economy and Employment ==
Kiryat Motzkin is primarily a commuter town, with most residents working outside the city. However, its population contributes significantly to the broader regional economy. A substantial portion of Kiryat Motzkin's residents are academics who work in high-tech companies, the oil industry, academia, and advanced defense industries, primarily in nearby Haifa or in the industrial zones of neighboring cities.

== Urban Development ==
Kiryat Motzkin has exhausted its land reserves for new construction. As a result, the city's urban future lies in urban renewal projects. These projects aim to modernize and densify existing neighborhoods while maintaining the city's character as a comfortable suburban area.

== Education ==
There are 18 schools and 11,000 students in Kiryat Motzkin, with 8 elementary schools (4,000 students) and 6 high schools (4,500 students). In 2023, 91.1% of 12th-grade students were eligible for a matriculation certificate.

== Transportation ==
Kiryat Motzkin is served by Kiryat Motzkin Railway Station, which is on the main Coastal railway line to Nahariya, with southerly trains to Beersheba and Modi'in. The Krayot Central Bus Station is located on the northern edge of the municipality and serves as a terminus for the Metronit bus rapid transit system and local bus routes.

== Voting Patterns ==
In the 2022 election, 52 percent of voters in Kiryat Motzkin voted for the parties of the center-left coalition led by Yair Lapid, while 46 percent voted for the parties of the right-wing coalition led by Benjamin Netanyahu and 0.1 percent voted for the Arab parties.

In the 2026 election, 53 percent of voters in Kiryat Motzkin voted for the parties of the center-left coalition led by Gadi Eisenkot, while 41 percent voted for the parties of the right-wing coalition led by Benjamin Netanyahu and 0.1 percent voted for the Arab parties. An additional 3.7 percent voted for the Reservists, and 1.7 percent voted for Amcha Yisrael. Voter turnout increased 18 percent from the 2022 election.

== Twin towns – sister cities ==
Kiryat Motzkin is twinned with:

- Bad Kreuznach (district), Germany
- Bad Segeberg, Germany
- Haßberge (district), Germany
- Kaifeng, China
- Mariánské Lázně, Czech Republic
- Nyíregyháza, Hungary
- Orlando, United States
- Radzyń County, Poland
- Włodawa County, Poland
- Magdeburg, Germany
- Kyustendil, Bulgaria (since 26 June 2026)

== Notable people ==
- Yuval Avidor (born 1986), footballer
- Mark Malyar (born 2000), Paralympic champion and world champion para swimmer
- Ofir Mizrahi (born 1993), footballer
- Shuki Schwartz (born 1954), basketball player
- Bar Soloveychik (born 2000), Olympic swimmer
