= Berl Locker =

Israeli politician

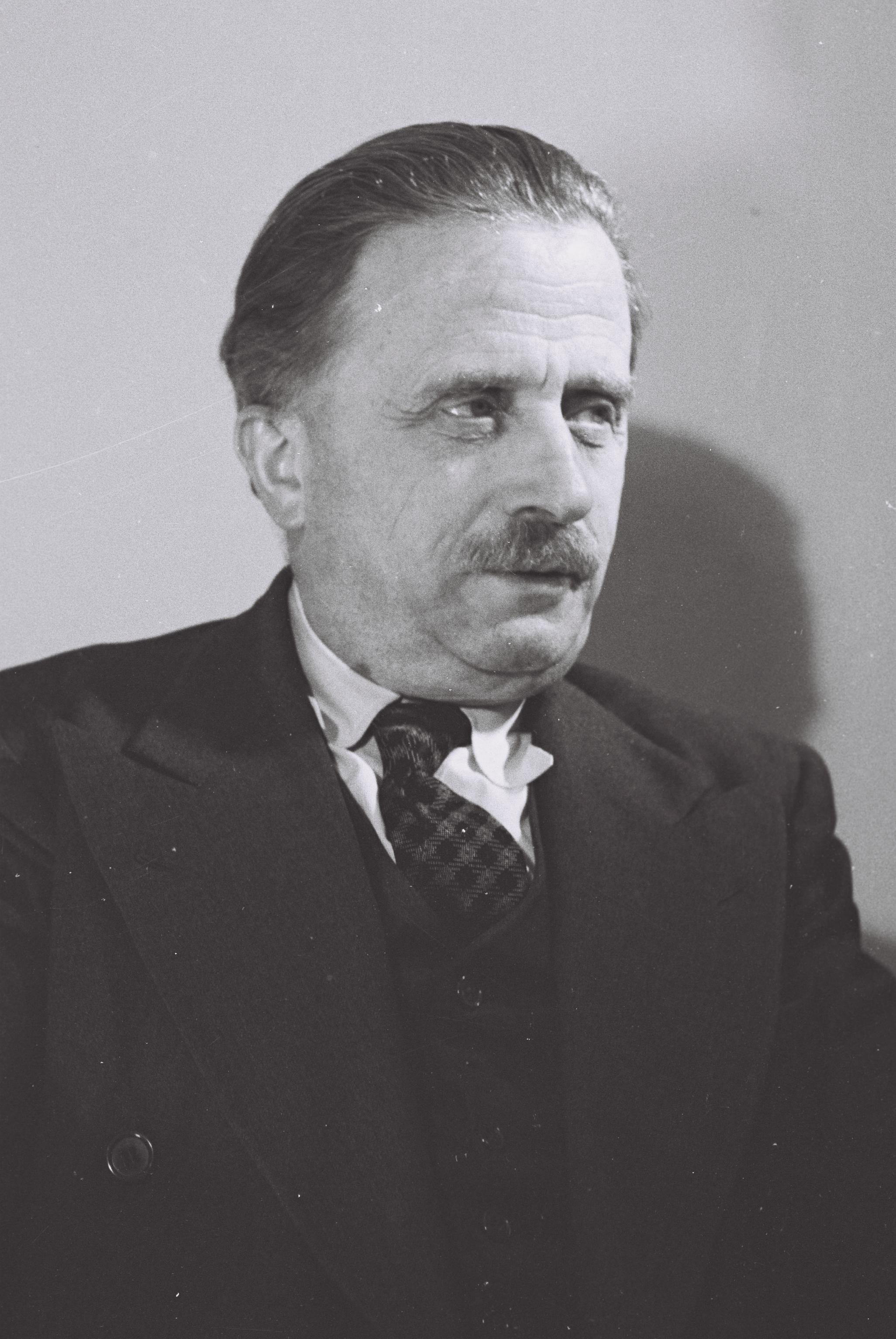
- Locker in 1948

Faction represented in the Knesset
- 1955–1959: Mapai

Personal details
- Born: 27 April 1887 Kriwiec, Austria-Hungary
- Died: 1 February 1972 (aged 84)

Berl Locker (Hebrew: ברל לוקר; 27 April 1887 – 1 February 1972) was a Zionist activist and Israeli politician.

== Biography ==
Born in Kriwiec in Austria-Hungary (now Ukraine), Locker was educated at a Jewish school. In 1902 he began contributing to the Der Yidisher Arbeiter newspaper, which he later became editor of. In 1904 he signed up to study law at Chernivtsi University, and in the same year established the Flowers of Zion student union.

The following year he joined Poale Zion, and became a member of its central committee in Austria-Hungary. In 1916 he became secretary of the movement's The Hague office, and later served the same role in Stockholm. He represented Poale Zion at conferences for socialist parties, and between 1918 and 1928 served as secretary of the Poale Zion World Union. From 1928 until 1931 he served as Poale Zion's secretary in the United States.

In 1931 he moved to London and became a member of the Jewish Agency board, on which he served until 1935. He also worked as a political advisor to the organisation. Between 1948 and 1956 he was chairman of the Agency's board of directors.

In 1955 he was elected to the Knesset on the Mapai list, but served only a single term.

Locker was married to the Yiddish poet Malka Locker. He died in 1972 at the age of 84.

== Awards ==
- In 1968, Locker received the Yakir Yerushalayim (Worthy Citizen of Jerusalem) award from the city of Jerusalem.
