= Lions Fountain, Jerusalem =

Coordinates: 31°46′11.4″N 35°13′28.1″E

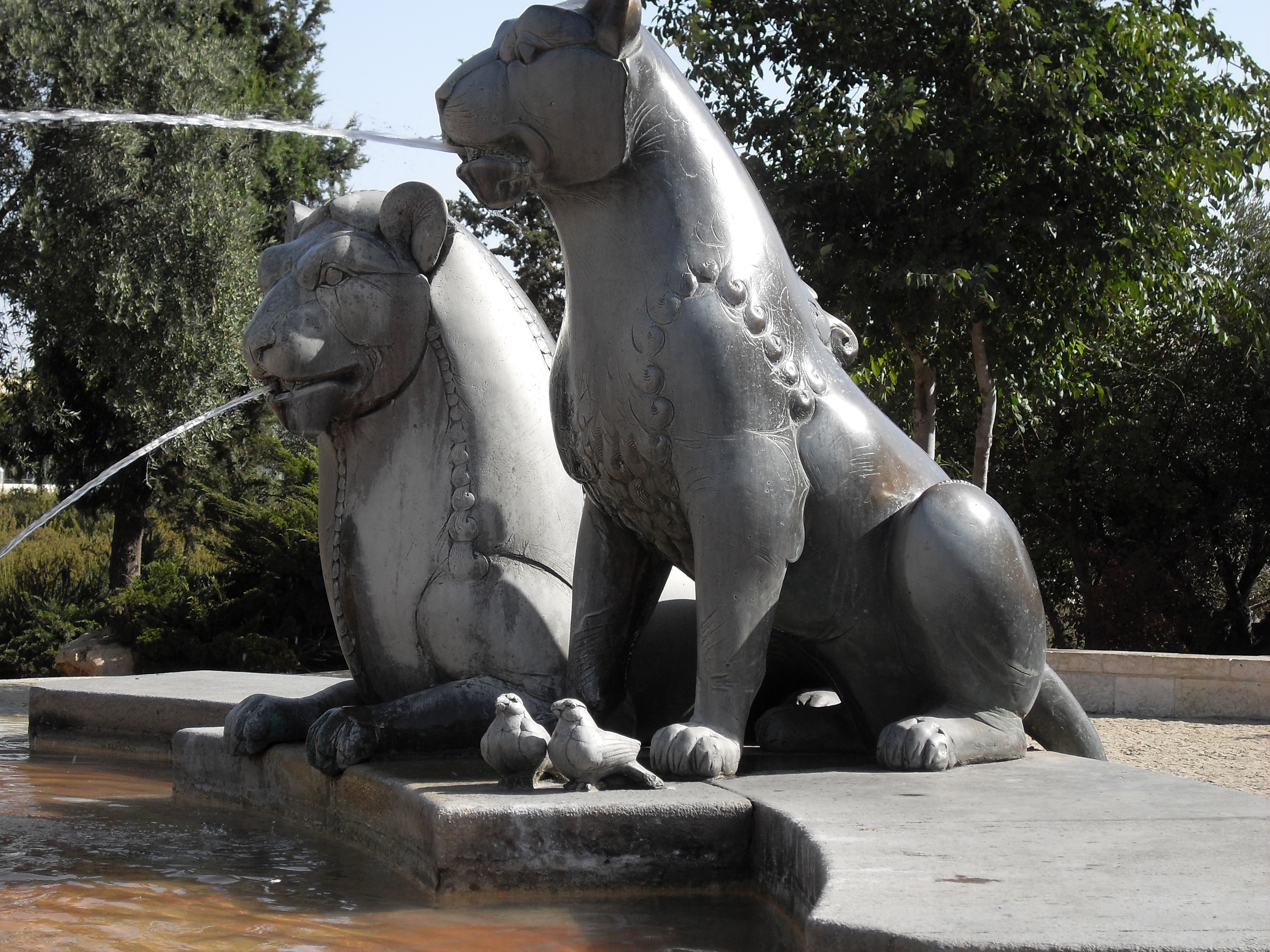
Lions Fountain

Lions Fountain is a fountain located in a park in the Yemin Moshe neighborhood of Jerusalem, Israel.

The bronze and gold-plated, sculpted fountain was designed by the German sculptor Gernot Rumpf. It was installed in 1989.

The fountain is a popular summertime waterplay space for Jerusalem's children.

== In popular culture ==
John Lyman's 2009 thriller, God's Lion, concludes with the protagonist landing a helicopter alongside the fountain.

== See also ==
- Israeli art
- National parks of Israel
