= 38th World Zionist Congress =

Congress of the World Zionist Organization in 2020

38th World Zionist Congress הקונגרס הציוני העולמי ה-38
- Begins: October 20, 2020
- Ends: October 22, 2020
- Frequency: every five years
- Locations: Online, headquartered in Jerusalem
- Inaugurated: 1897
- Founder: Theodor Herzl
- Previous event: 2015 (37th)
- Next event: 2025 (39th)
- Participants: 524 delegates
- Organizer: World Zionist Organization

The 38th World Zionist Congress (Hebrew: הקונגרס הציוני העולמי ה-38) convened in Jerusalem, on October 20–22, 2020, with the participation of over 700 delegates and thousands of people from 35 countries to elect leadership positions and determine policy for the World Zionist Organization (WZO). Due to the ongoing COVID-19 pandemic during 2020, the Congress sessions and deliberations were held online by means of a global virtual platform.

== Delegates and elections ==
The Congress was composed of 524 delegates: 199 from Israel (38%), 152 from the United States (29%), and 173 from the rest of the Jewish diaspora (33%). Election saw increased support for the Religious Zionist Mizrachi and Haredi Eretz Hakodesh slates giving the religious and right-wing Zionist blocs a slight majority for the first time in WZO history.

=== Australia ===
Representation of the Australian Zionist delegation was determined on June 2, 2020. For the first time, progressive groups ran under the Hatikvah grouping, which included the New Israel Fund, Ameinu, Meretz, Habonim Dror and Hashomer Hatzair. The group won two seats. Other parties represented included ARZA (Reform Judaism) (4 seats), Mizrahi (Modern Orthodox) (4 seats), Mercaz-Masorti (Conservative Judaism) (2 seats) and Friends of Likud (1 seat).

=== Canada ===
The delegation of 20 to the consisted of 6 for the Reform movement, 5 representing Russian-Canadian Jews, 4 representing the Mizrachi (Modern Orthodox) movement, 3 for Mercaz representing Conservative Judaism, 1 for Labor Zionism, and one for Herut.

Slate	Seats (Note: The allocation of seats is made after the results are certified.)	Position/Ideology
MERCAZ Canada	3	Conservative-Masorti Judaism
Labour	1	Israeli Labor Party
Artzeinu	6	Reform Judaism
Mizrahi	4	Mizrachi; Modern orthodox
Beiteinu Olami	5	Yisrael Beiteinu affiliation.
Herut	1	The Jabotinsky Movement

=== Israel ===
The number of delegates representing Israel in the Congress is determined in accordance with the size of the Zionist parties in the Knesset. Thus, the Israeli representatives to the Congress will be apportioned according to the results of the elections to the twenty-second Knesset, held in September 2019.

=== United States ===
Representation of the United States Zionist delegation is determined by elections held under the auspices of the American Zionist Movement several months prior to the Congress. These elections took place from January 21, 2020 to March 11, 2020.

123,575 votes were cast, more than double the number in the election for the previous congress in 2015. Fifteen groups, comprising over 1,800 candidates, competed for the 152 seats allocated to the American Zionist movement. The results of the elections were as follows:

Slate	Votes	Seats	Position/Ideology
Reform	31,483	39	ARZA; Reform Movement and Reconstructing Judaism
Orthodox Israel Coalition – Mizrachi	21,692	27	Mizrahi; religious Zionists
Eretz Hakodesh	20,045	25	Haredi; ultra-Orthodox
Mercaz USA	14,655	18	Conservative-Masorti Judaism
ZOA Coalition	10,312	13	Zionist Organization of America (ZOA), Torah from Sinai, Make Israel Great (MIG) & National Pro-Israel Partners
American Forum for Israel	8,096	10	Yisrael Beiteinu affiliation
Hatikvah	7,936	10	Progressive Israel Slate; representing 11 groups (Note: Aleph, Ameinu, Americans for Peace Now, Habonim Dror North America, Hashomer Hatzair, J Street, the Jewish Labor Committee, the National Council of Jewish Women, the New Israel Fund, Partners for Progressive Israel, and T'ruah.)
Shas Olami	2,045	2	Shas Olami; worldwide Sephardi Orthodox movement
Kol Yisrael	1,749	2	"For the Love of Israel – Making Zionism Compelling in the 21st Century"
Dorshei Torah V’Tziyon	1,371	2	Modern Orthodox; "Torah and Israel for All"
Herut Zionists	1,154	1	The Jabotinsky Movement
VISION movement	1,038	1	Hebrew Universalism; "Empowering the Next Generation"
Americans4Israel	856	1	"Peace, Unity & Security"
Israel Shelanu	769	1	"Our Israel"; Israelis residing in the United States
Ohavei Zion	374	0	World Sephardic Zionist Organization

=== Mexico ===
Representation of the Mexican delegation was determined by elections held under the auspices of the Mexican Zionist Federation during March, 2020. Five slates competed for 7 delegates allotted to México. The final results of the elections were as follows:

Slate	% of vote	Seats (Note: The allocation of seats is made after the results are certified.)	Position/Ideology
Magshimim	29.7%	2	Coalition of Hanoar Hatzioni, Dor Jadash, Hejalutz Lamerjav, Organización Sionista Sefaradí & Confederatzia; Center, independent
Union Sionista	26.3%	2	Coalition of Mercaz, Meretz/Hashomer Hatzair & Guimel LGBTQ; Center left
Likud México	19.2%	1	Likud; Right wing
Mizrahi – Bnei Akiva	15.4%	1	Mizrachi; Modern orthodox
Movimiento Avoda Hatzionit	9.5%	1	Israeli Labor Party; Left wing

=== Other countries ===
The delegates from the Jewish communities other than Israel and the United States are usually determined by agreement between "the various Jewish communities and factions" instead of elections.

These numbers come from Election Result of the 38th World Zionist Congress, which contains the complete breakdown for each country.

== Resolutions ==
- The Zionist Congress XXXVIII Adopted Resolutions

== See also ==
- World Zionist Congress
