= World Zionist Congress =

World Zionist Organization governing body

- The Second Zionist Congress in Basel, 1898
- Status: Active (39 editions)
- Venue: Jerusalem (post-1948); various European cities (pre-1948)
- Country: Israel (post-1948); various European (pre-1948)
- Inaugurated: 1897 (1st)
- Founder: Theodor Herzl
- Most recent: 2025 (39th)
- Organizer: World Zionist Organization
- Website: Official website

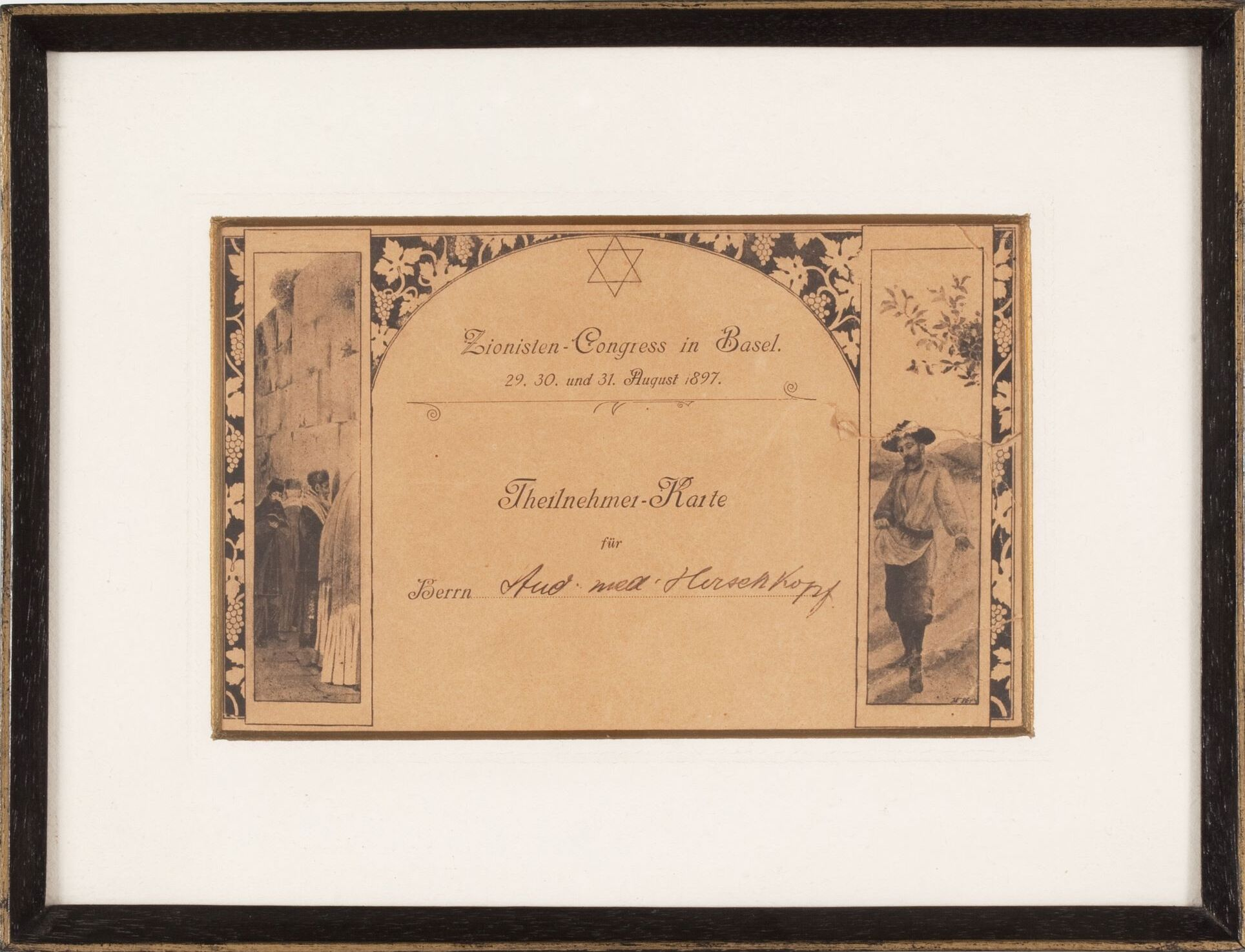
Participant card for the first Zionist congress in Basel, Jewish Museum of Switzerland.

The Zionist Congress was established in 1897 by Theodor Herzl as the supreme organ of the Zionist Organization (ZO) and its legislative authority. In 1960, the names were changed to World Zionist Congress (Hebrew: הקונגרס הציוני העולמי HaKongres HaTsioni HaOlami) and World Zionist Organization (WZO), respectively. The World Zionist Organization elects the officers and decides on the policies of the WZO and the Jewish Agency, including "determining the allocation of funds." The First Zionist Congress was held in Basel, Switzerland in 1897. Any Jew over age 18 who belongs to a Zionist association is eligible to vote, and the number of elected delegates to the Congress is 500. 38% of the delegates are allocated to Israel, 29% to the United States of America, and 33% to the remainder of the countries of the Diaspora. In addition there are about 100 delegates which are appointed by International Organizations (e.g. B'nai B'rith, see below) affiliated with WZO.

After the First Zionist Congress in 1897, the Zionist Congress met every year until 1901, then every second year from 1903 to 1913 and 1921 to 1939. Until 1946, the Congress was held every two years in various European cities, save for interruptions during the two World Wars. Their goal was to build an infrastructure to further the cause of Jewish settlement in Palestine. Since the Second World War, meetings have been held approximately every four years. Also, since the creation of the State of Israel, the Congress has met every four or five years in Jerusalem.

The 39th World Zionist Congress convened in Jerusalem from October 28–30, 2025.

== History ==
The Zionist Congress, later renamed to the World Zionist Congress, was held at intervals of 1 year (1897–1901), then 2 years (1903–1939) until the outbreak of the Second World War, with an eight-year break (1913–1921) due to the First World War.

The First Zionist Congress, held in 1897 in Basel, Switzerland, had Theodor Herzl acting as chairperson. The Congress was attended by some 200 participants who formulated the Zionist platform, known as the "Basel programme", and established the Zionist Organization (ZO). In contrast with the older Hibbat Zion movement, the ZO took a clear stance in favour of political Zionism, stating in its programme that "Zionism seeks to establish a home in Palestine for the Jewish people, secured under public law." Herzl wrote in his diary, "Were I to sum up the Basel Congress in a word - which I shall guard against pronouncing publicly - it would be this: At Basel I founded the Jewish State."

The Twenty-third Zionist Congress, held in 1951 in Jerusalem, was the first to be held after the establishment of the State of Israel, and the first held in Jerusalem, which would become the norm. It was opened at the graveside of Theodor Herzl, whose remains had been moved from Vienna and reburied on the top of a hill in Jerusalem that was renamed after him, Mount Herzl. The Congress issued the Jerusalem Program, placing its main focus on the newly created state as the central unifying element for the Jewish people.

Ruth Popkin was the first woman to be Chair of the Presidium and President of the World Zionist Congress, being elected to both positions in 1987.

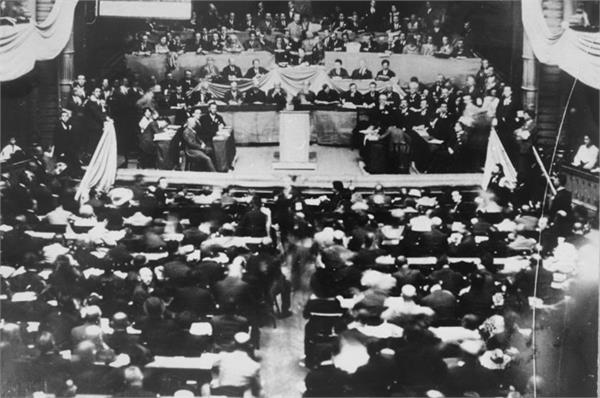
12th Zionist Congress, Carlsbad 1921

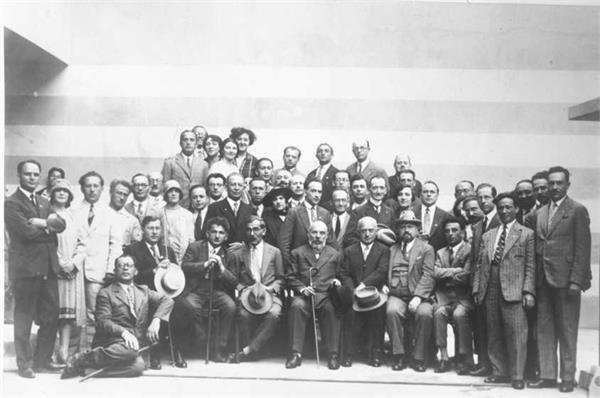
16th Zionist Congress, Zurich 1929

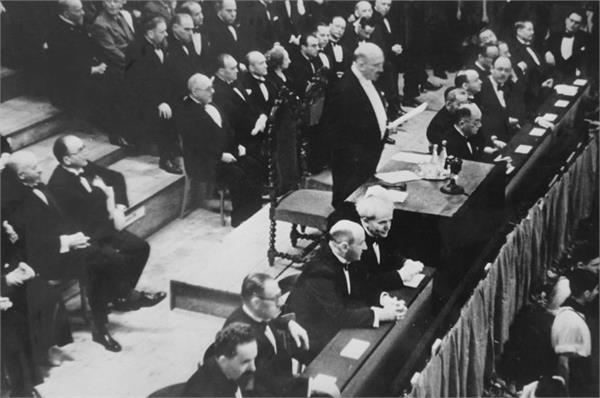
20th Zionist Congress, Zurich 1937

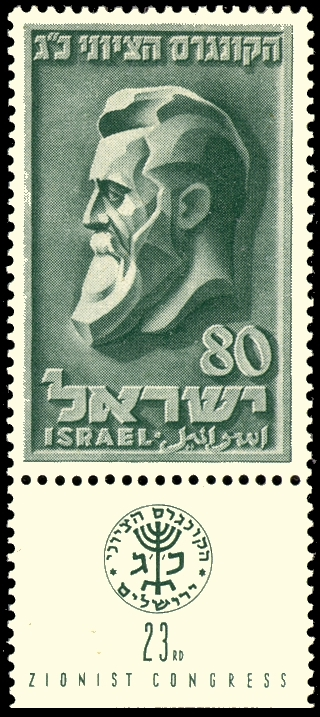
23rd Zionist Congress, Israeli postal stamp

List of World Zionist Congresses
Congress	City	Country	Year
First	Basel	Switzerland	1897
Second	Basel	Switzerland	1898
Third	Basel	Switzerland	1899
Fourth	London	United Kingdom	1900
Fifth	Basel	Switzerland	1901
Sixth	Basel	Switzerland	1903
Seventh	Basel	Switzerland	1905
Eighth	The Hague	Netherlands	1907
Ninth	Hamburg	German Empire	1909
Tenth	Basel	Switzerland	1911
Eleventh	Vienna	Austria-Hungary	1913
Twelfth	Carlsbad	Czechoslovakia	1921
Thirteenth	Carlsbad	Czechoslovakia	1923
Fourteenth	Vienna	Austria	1925
Fifteenth	Basel	Switzerland	1927
Sixteenth	Zürich	Switzerland	1929
Seventeenth	Basel	Switzerland	1931
Eighteenth	Prague	Czechoslovakia	1933
Nineteenth	Lucerne	Switzerland	1935
Twentieth	Zürich	Switzerland	1937
Twenty-first	Geneva	Switzerland	1939
Twenty-second	Basel	Switzerland	1946
Twenty-third	Jerusalem	Israel	1951
Twenty-fourth	Jerusalem	Israel	1956
Twenty-fifth	Jerusalem	Israel	1960
Twenty-sixth	Jerusalem	Israel	1964
Twenty-seventh	Jerusalem	Israel	1968
Twenty-eighth	Jerusalem	Israel	1972
Twenty-ninth	Jerusalem	Israel	1978
Thirtieth	Jerusalem	Israel	1982
Thirty-first	Jerusalem	Israel	1987
Thirty-second	Jerusalem	Israel	1992
Thirty-third	Jerusalem	Israel	1997
Thirty-fourth	Jerusalem	Israel	2002
Thirty-fifth	Jerusalem	Israel	2006
Thirty-sixth	Jerusalem	Israel	2010
Thirty-seventh	Jerusalem	Israel	2015
Thirty-eighth	Jerusalem	Israel	2020
Thirty-ninth	Jerusalem	Israel	2025

== Representatives ==
Members and delegates at the 1939 Zionist congress, by country/region (Zionism was banned in the Soviet Union). 70,000 Polish Jews supported the Revisionist Zionism movement, which was not represented.
Country/Region	Members	Delegates
Poland	299,165	109
US	263,741	114
Palestine	167,562	134
Romania	60,013	28
United Kingdom	23,513	15
South Africa	22,343	14
Canada	15,220	8

The World Zionist Congress includes representatives of Zionist World Unions, Women's Zionist Organizations with Special Status and International Jewish Organizations.

=== Zionist World Unions ===
Zionist participants in the World Zionist Congress are free to form Brit Olamit or Zionist World Unions (ideological groupings), which are somewhat like political parties. While Israeli political parties can participate in the Congress, brits are also organized and voted into the Congress by non-Israelis, making the Congress a multinational deliberative body for the Jewish diaspora. However, as aliyah has brought Jews to Israel from other countries, Israeli representation in the legislature has increased at the expense of non-Israeli Jewish diaspora representation. A Brit Olamit (World Union) must have representation in at least five countries to send a delegation to the Congress.

There are currently six Zionist World Unions (with full voting rights):

- World Zionist Union: Labor Zionist Movement – Arzenu – World Union of Meretz. Arzenu is an organization for the political representation of Reform and Progressive Religious Zionist communities in Israel and fourteen other countries. It was founded in 1980 as a Brit Olamit, and is affiliated with the Netzer Olami youth organization.
- United Faction: Kadima–HaNoar HaTzioni– MERCAZ
- World Mizrachi/Ichud Le'umi/Herut/Yisrael Beytenu/Moledet/Tkuma
- World Likud/Shas
- Hadassah/Confederation
- Over The Rainbow – the Zionist movement

=== Israeli representatives ===
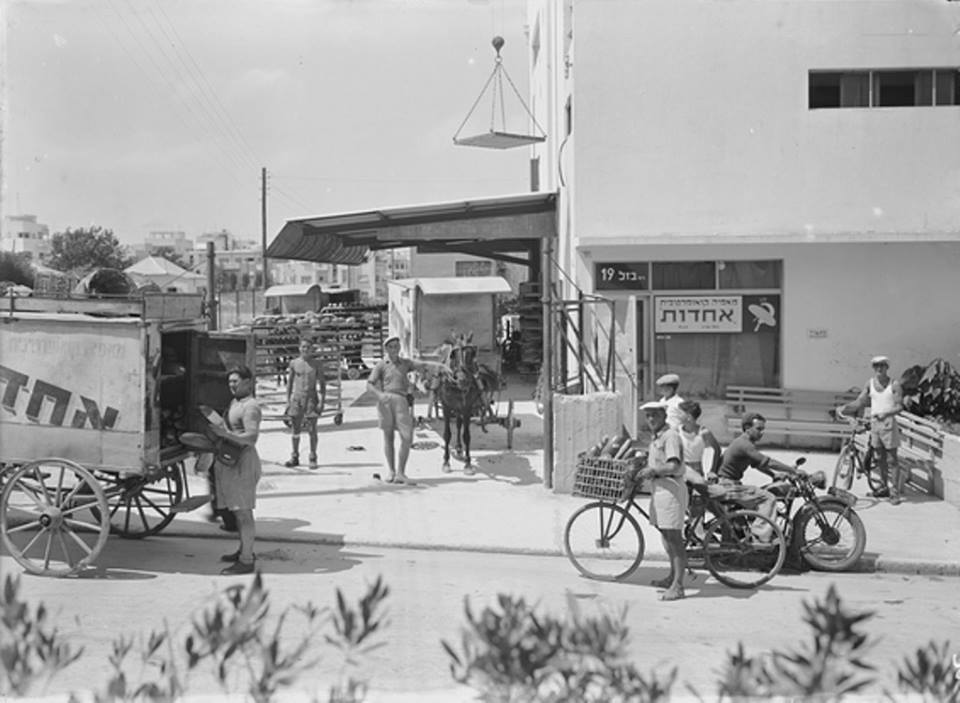
Basel Street in Tel Aviv (c. 1939) named in honor of the first Congress of 1897

Since the creation of the State of Israel, there are no elections held for Israeli delegates to the World Zionist Congress. Rather, elections to the Knesset, Israel's parliament, are deemed to fulfill this function, and Zionist parties represented in the Knesset are apportioned a number of Congress delegates proportional to their strength in the Knesset. The late left-wing leader Shulamit Aloni on several occasions criticized this practice, stating that "Most Israeli citizens neither know nor care that when they go to the polls they are among other things also electing delegates to the World Zionist Congress."

=== Zionist organizations with special status ===
Two women's organizations have special status in the Zionist Organization and have full voting rights:

- Women's International Zionist Organization – is an international, non-party Zionist body, which receives global representation by virtue of an agreement entered into in 1964.
- Hadassah – received special status by virtue of a decision of the Zionist General Council, in 1994.

=== International Jewish organizations ===
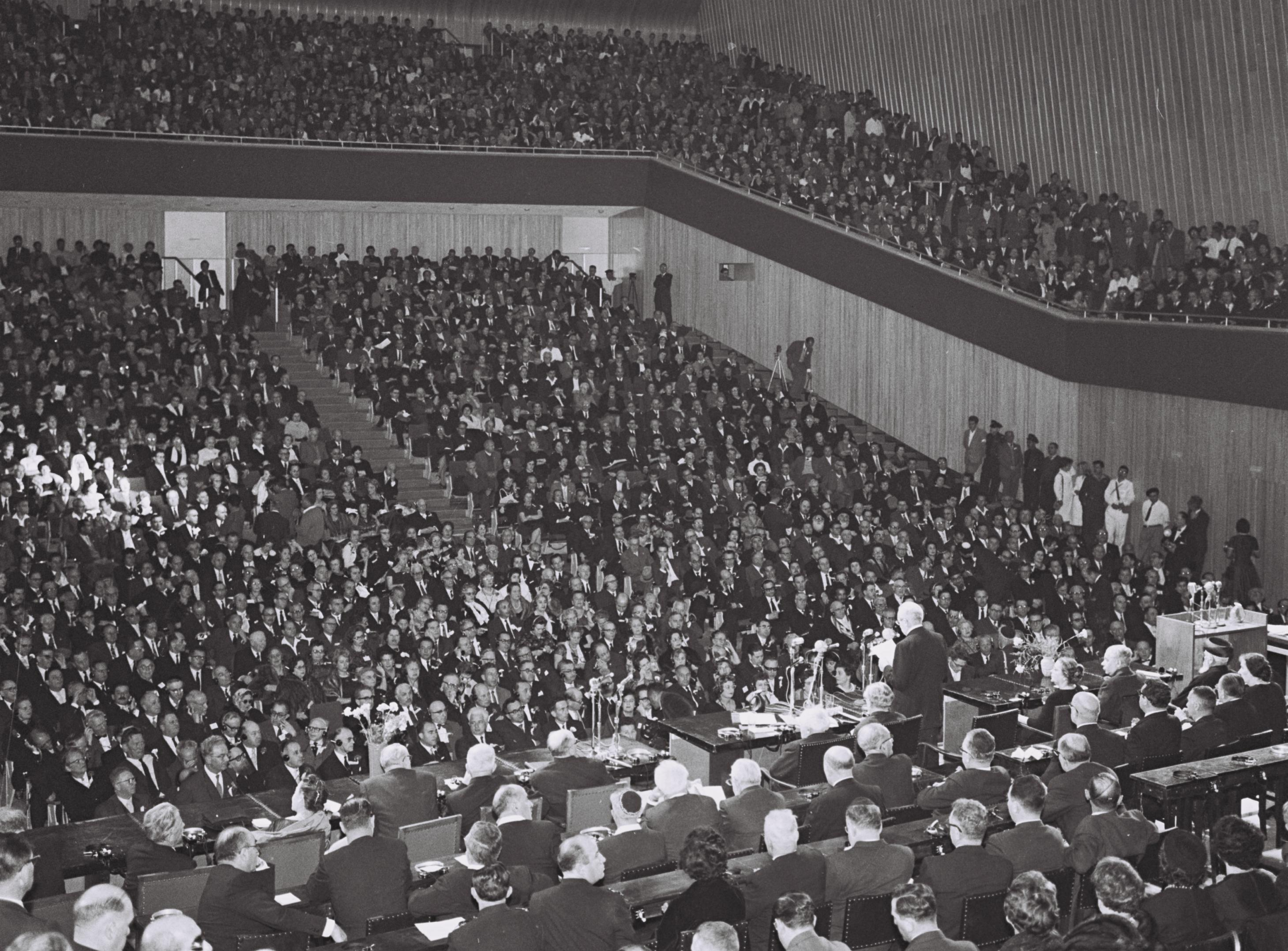
25th Zionist Congress, Jerusalem, 1960

The international Jewish organizations have also been represented in the Zionist Congress since 1972, provided that they accept the Jerusalem Program, even if not all their members are declared Zionists. These bodies have limited voting rights – they do not vote on matters of candidature and elections to the institutions of the WZO.

The following are the International Jewish Organizations (limited voting rights):

- B'nai B'rith International
- Maccabi World Union
- Na'amat
- Women's International Zionist Organization
- World Council of Conservative Masorti Synagogues (Masorati Olami)
- World Emunah
- World Organization of Orthodox Synagogues & Communities in Israel and the Diaspora
- American Sephardi Federation
- World Union for Progressive Judaism
- World Union of Jewish Students
- Zionist Council in Israel

=== Other participants in Congress (advisors, observers) ===
- In addition to the delegates with full voting rights participating in Congress, there are also participants in an advisory capacity which can participate in debates but have no voting rights. These may consist of office holders such as members of the Zionist Executive, members of the Zionist General Council who were not elected as delegates to Congress, Chairs of the Zionist Federations, judicial office holders - the President of the Zionist Supreme Court, the Attorney, the Comptroller and representatives of the Aliyah Movement.
- Observers with no speaking or voting rights can be invited by the Zionist Executive or the Congress Presidium.

== Proceedings ==
The Zionist Congress is conducted by the Congress Presidium. Congress deliberations are divided into five stages:

- Opening of the Congress, including a speech by the Chairman of the Executive, and other speeches determined in the agenda, election of the Congress Presidium, the report of the President of the Zionist Supreme Court on the election results, reports of the members of the Zionist Executive in supplement to the printed report, election of the Congress committees.
- Election of the new Executive, according to the proposal of the Congress Standing Committee.
- Meetings of the committees.
- Reports of the committees and voting on the draft resolutions presented by them. The report of the Standing Committee and voting on its proposals for members of the Zionist General Council, the Comptroller and the Legal Institutions.
- Congress closing ceremony.

== See also ==
- Jerusalem Program of the WZC: 1951, 1968, 2004, 2024
- Jewish Agency for Israel
- List of Jewish leaders in the Land of Israel
