= World Confederation of United Zionists =

Alliance of worldwide Zionist organizations

- Abbreviation: CUZ
- Founded: 1958
- Type: Faction of the World Zionist Congress and World Zionist Organization
- Purpose: To revitalize the Zionist movement
- Key people: David Yaari (Chairman)

The World Confederation of United Zionists (CUZ), an offshoot of the World Confederation of General Zionists, is a world union of Zionist organizations, federations and youth movements, as well as a global party of General Zionists within the World Zionist Organization. It has branches in 21 countries throughout the world.

== History ==
Formed in 1958, CUZ is an offshoot of the General Zionist movement which was established in 1922. Zionist leader Kalman Sultanik who served as former vice president of the World Jewish Congress and a member of the World Zionist Executive, both represented and led CUZ and the World Confederation of General Zionists prior to that for 60 years.

== Activities ==
CUZ partners with various Zionist youth movements, including Young Judea, the Federation of Zionist Youth, and Tzofim Tzabar Olami, as well as other unaffiliated groups throughout the former Soviet Union and Latin America. It has also partnered with Hadassah women's organization. In addition, CUZ runs a culture center in Jerusalem with activities focusing on Aliyah, Hebrew language and strengthening Israel’s relationship with neighboring countries.

In September 2020, in an effort to strengthen ties between Israel, diaspora communities and Zionist youth movements, CUZ signed a cooperation agreement with HaNoar HaTzioni (the Liberal Center for Zionist Youth movement), joining forces to send 35 representatives to the World Zionist Congress.

On November 29, 2020, senior leaders of CUZ presented a special certificate to the Embassy of the Philippines in recognition of the Philippines being the only Asian country to vote in favor of the 1947 United Nations Partition Plan for Palestine.

== Goals ==
CUZ goals include revitalizing and advancing the cause of General Zionism while strengthening ties between Israel and diaspora communities.
