= Jerusalem Program =

Ideological platform of the Zionist Movement

The Jerusalem Program (Hebrew: תוכנית ירושלים) is the ideological platform of the Zionist Movement, and was initially adopted in 1951 at the twenty-third Zionist Congress to replace the Basel Program. The Jerusalem Program differed from the original Basel Program in that it shifted the goals of the Zionist Movement once the State of Israel was already established.

== The 1951 Jerusalem Program ==
The 1951 Jerusalem Program stated that: The task of Zionism is the consolidation of the State of Israel, the in gathering of exiles in Eretz Israel, and the fostering of the unity of the Jewish people. The program of work of the World Zionist Organization is:

1. Encouragement of immigration, absorption and integration of immigrants; support of Youth Aliyah; stimulation of agricultural settlement and economic development; acquisition of land as the property of the people.
2. Intensive work for halutziut (pioneering) and hachsharah (training for halutziut).
3. Concerted effort to harness funds in order to carry out the tasks of Zionism.
4. Encouragement of private capital investment.
5. Fostering of Jewish consciousness by propagating the Zionist idea and strengthening the Zionist Movement; imparting the values of Judaism; Hebrew education and spreading the Hebrew language.
6. Mobilization of world public opinion for Israel and Zionism.
7. Participation in efforts to organize and intensify Jewish life on democratic foundations, maintenance and defense of Jewish rights.

== Revisions (1968, 2004, 2024) ==
The Jerusalem program was revised by the 27th Zionist Congress in 1968, thereafter at the meeting of the Zionist General Council in 2004, and most recently in 2024.

Zionism, the national liberation movement of the Jewish people, brought about the establishment of the State of Israel, and views a Jewish, Zionist, democratic and secure State of Israel to be the expression of the common responsibility of the Jewish people for its continuity and future.

The Jerusalem Program's foundations of Zionism are:

1. The unity of the Jewish people, its bond to its historic homeland, the Land of Israel, and the centrality of the State of Israel and Jerusalem, its capital, in the life of the nation;
2. Aliyah (emigration) to Israel from all countries and the effective integration of all immigrants into Israeli society.
3. Strengthening Israel as a Jewish, Zionist and democratic state and shaping it as an exemplary society with a unique moral and spiritual character, marked by mutual respect for the multi-faceted Jewish people, rooted in the vision of the prophets, striving for peace and contributing to the betterment of the world.
4. Ensuring the future and the distinctiveness of the Jewish people by furthering Jewish, Hebrew and Zionist education, fostering spiritual and cultural values and teaching Hebrew as the national language;
5. Nurturing mutual Jewish responsibility, defending the rights of Jews as individuals and as a nation, representing the national Zionist interests of the Jewish people, and struggling against all manifestations of anti-Semitism;
6. Settling the country as an expression of practical Zionism;
7. Encouraging recruitment and service in the Israel Defense Forces and the security forces and strengthening them as the protective force of the Jewish people living in Zion, as well as encouraging full National Service for anyone exempted in law from service in the IDF.
