= Zhabotinsky =

Zhabotinsky or Jabotinsky (Ukrainian: Жаботинський) is a masculine Ukrainian toponymic surname referring to the village of Zhabotin. Its feminine counterpart is Zhabotinskaya, Jabotinskaya, Zhabotinska or Jabotinska. Notable people with the surname include:

- Anatol Zhabotinsky (1938–2008), Soviet Russian physicist
- Eri Jabotinsky (1910–1969), Revisionist Zionist activist, Israeli politician and academic mathematician
- Leonid Zhabotinsky (1938–2016), Soviet Ukrainian weightlifter
- Ze'ev Jabotinsky (1880–1940), Revisionist Zionist leader, father of Eri
