= Canadian Young Judaea =

Canadian Zionist youth movement

- יהודה הצעיר קנדה
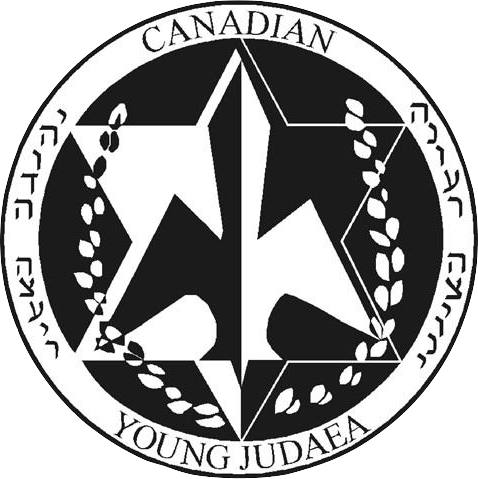
- Formation: 1917; 109 years ago
- Founder: Bernard Joseph
- Type: Zionist youth movement
- Headquarters: 788 Marlee Avenue; Toronto, Ontario
- Region served: Canada
- Members: 2,000 (2017)
- Executive Director: Risa Epstein
- Staff: 750 (2017)
- Website: youngjudaea.ca

Canadian Young Judaea (Hebrew: יְהוּדָה הַצָעִיר קָנָדָה, Yehuda HaTza'ir Canada) is the largest Zionist youth movement in Canada. The movement was founded as the youth wing of Canadian Hadassah-WIZO and the Zionist Organization of Canada in 1917, and is affiliated with HaNoar HaTzioni. Young Judaea operates five Jewish summer camps across Canada.

== History ==
Canadian Young Judaea was established by Bernard Joseph at the 15th Zionist Convention in Winnipeg in 1917. Acting as the youth wing of Canadian Hadassah-WIZO and the Zionist Organization of Canada, Young Judaea held biennial and regional conferences and facilitated transnational social contact between members with its Correspondence Club. At weekly meetings, activities included lectures and discussions on Jewish history, current affairs and topics related to Zionism.

By 1925, there were 75 clubs across Canada and by 1935 national membership reached 5,000. Louis Rasminsky served as national vice-president in 1926. A. M. Klein served as editor of The Judaean, the movement's magazine, from 1928 to 1932 and as national president in 1934. Young Judaea became officially affiliated with HaNoar HaTzioni in 1950.

Young Judaea soon grew from a city-based organization to one based around summer camps and Israel programs. The movement's summer camps were modelled after the pioneering kibbutzim in Israel. Young Judaea opened Camp Hagshama (later renamed Camp Kinneret) in 1942 in Mont-Tremblant, Quebec, followed by Camp Kadima in Nova Scotia in 1943. Camp Biluim was founded in 1951 in Perth, Ontario, which offered an intensive leadership development program for older teenagers. Camp Biluim moved to the site of Camp Hagshama in 1972.

== Summer camps ==
Canadian Young Judaea is the umbrella organization for a number of Canadian Jewish summer camps, including Camp Shalom in Muskoka, Camp Kadimah in Lunenburg County, Camp Solelim in Sudbury, Camp Hatikvah in Kelowna, and Camp Kinneret–Biluim in Mont-Tremblant. Young Judaea also runs a four-week summer tour of Israel and a post-secondary educational gap year program.

In 2018, Canadian Young Judaea announced it would be launching a week-long overnight summer camp for LGBTQ Jewish campers called Machane Lev.

== See also ==
- HaNoar HaTzioni
- Young Judaea
