= Ifat Ovadia-Luski =

Israeli Zionist organization executive (born 1976)

- יפעת עובדיה-לוסקי
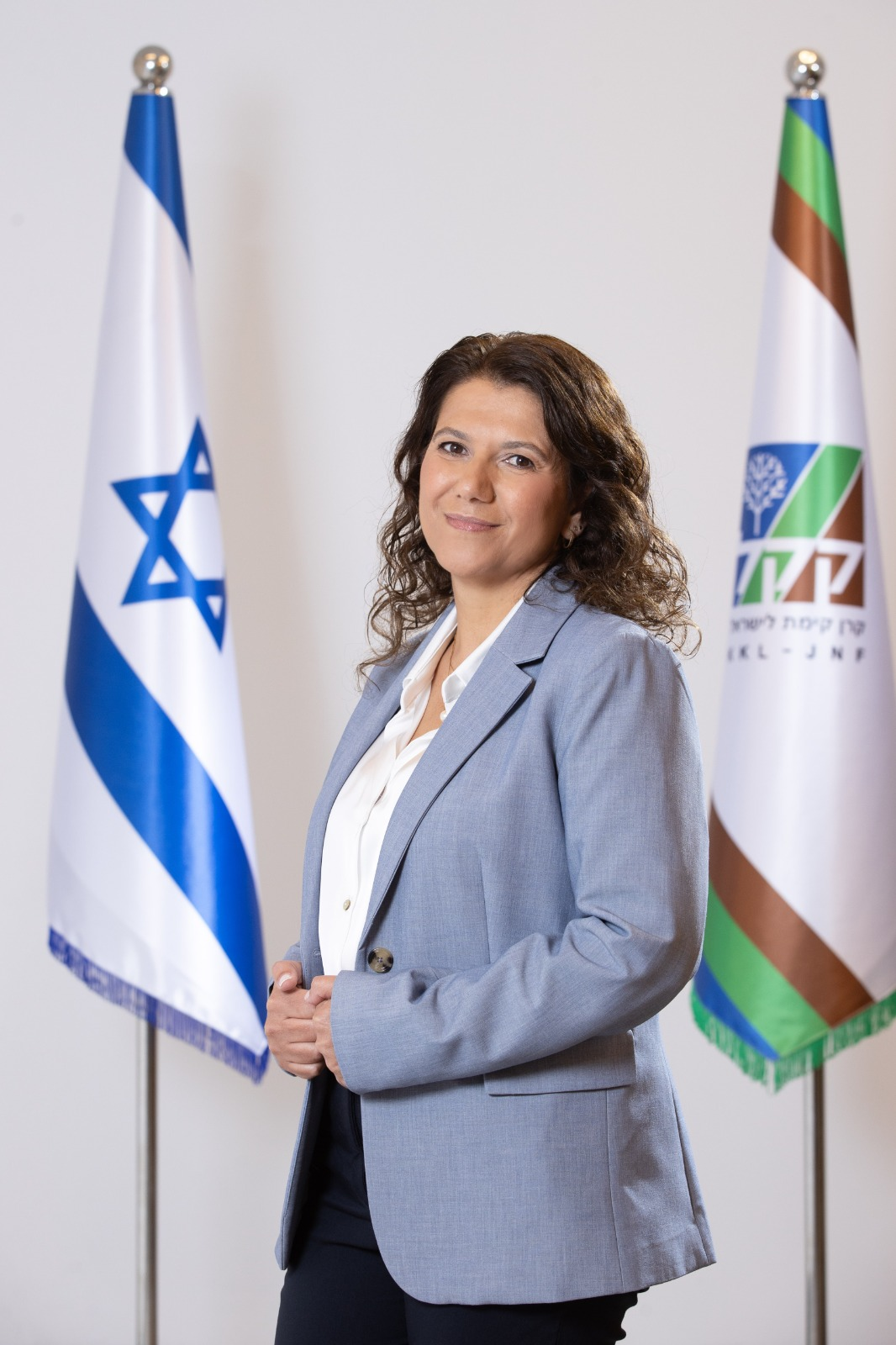

15th Chairperson of the Jewish National Fund (KKL-JNF)
- In office 6 December 2022 – 31 December 2025
- Preceded by: Avraham Duvdevani
- Succeeded by: Eyal Ostrinsky

Personal details
- Born: 3 June 1976 (age 50) Bat Yam, Israel
- Spouse: Amir
- Children: 3
- Education: Hebrew University of Jerusalem; Tel Aviv University

Ifat Ovadia-Luski (Hebrew: יפעת עובדיה-לוסקי; born 3 June 1976) is an Israeli executive in Zionist organizations who serves as head of the Department for Combating Antisemitism at the World Zionist Organization. From 2022 to 2025 she served as chairperson of the Jewish National Fund (Keren Kayemeth LeIsrael, KKL-JNF), becoming the first woman to hold that position. She is a member of the Jewish Agency's Board of Trustees and a member of the board of Yad Vashem.

Before her appointment as chair of KKL-JNF, she headed the Department for Hebrew Language and Culture at the World Zionist Organization, and previously served for more than four years as chief executive of World Likud.

== Biography ==
Ovadia-Luski was born and raised in Bat Yam. She studied at the ORT Ramat Yosef high school in Bat Yam. She was drafted into the Israel Defense Forces and served in the Education Corps in Jerusalem.

She has served as a member of the public council for commemorating the legacy of Ze'ev Jabotinsky and as a member of the public council of the Betar movement.

From 2013 to 2015 she served as chief of staff at the Ministry of Defense and the Ministry of Science and Technology, where she helped lead an initiative to make science accessible to peripheral communities and to encourage military enlistment among special populations.

In 2016 she was appointed chief executive of World Likud, the first woman to hold the post. During her tenure she expanded the organization's international activity, recruiting branch heads in Diaspora Jewish communities for programs of Holocaust commemoration and for efforts against antisemitism, hate crimes, and the BDS movement against Israel.

Following the 38th Zionist Congress in 2020, she was elected to head the Department for Hebrew Language and Culture at the World Zionist Organization, and has since been a member of the Jewish Agency's board of trustees.

In December 2022 the KKL-JNF board of directors elected Ovadia-Luski as chair, succeeding Avraham Duvdevani, who had held the post for the previous two years.

In May 2023 she led a five-year agreement between KKL-JNF and the Government of Israel under which the fund committed to transfer 6 billion shekels to the state through national projects in settlement, development of the periphery, and environmental initiatives.

During the Swords of Iron War she initiated the "Heroines' Path" at the entrance to Ofakim Park, intended to commemorate the bravery of Israeli women who acted with composure and helped save the lives of dozens of people during the October 7 attacks. On Tu BiShvat that year she also initiated tree plantings in memory of those murdered at the Nova festival at the Re'im campsite in the Be'eri Forest.

She ended her tenure as chair of KKL-JNF on 31 December 2025. In January 2026 she was appointed head of the Department for Combating Antisemitism at the World Zionist Organization.

Ovadia-Luski holds a bachelor's degree in Hebrew literature and history from the Hebrew University of Jerusalem and a master's degree with honors in administration and education policy from Tel Aviv University.

She is married to Amir and is the mother of three children. She lives in Tzur Hadassah.

== Recognition ==
In September 2023 she was named, together with Yaakov Hagoel, chairman of the World Zionist Organization, and Sam (Shmuel) Grundwerg, chairman of Keren Hayesod, to The Jerusalem Post annual list of the 50 most influential Jews of the year.

In March 2024 she was named to Globes list of the 50 most influential women in Israel, and was again named one of the 50 most influential women in March 2025.
