= National Institutions House =

Government building in Jerusalem

- בית המוסדות הלאומיים
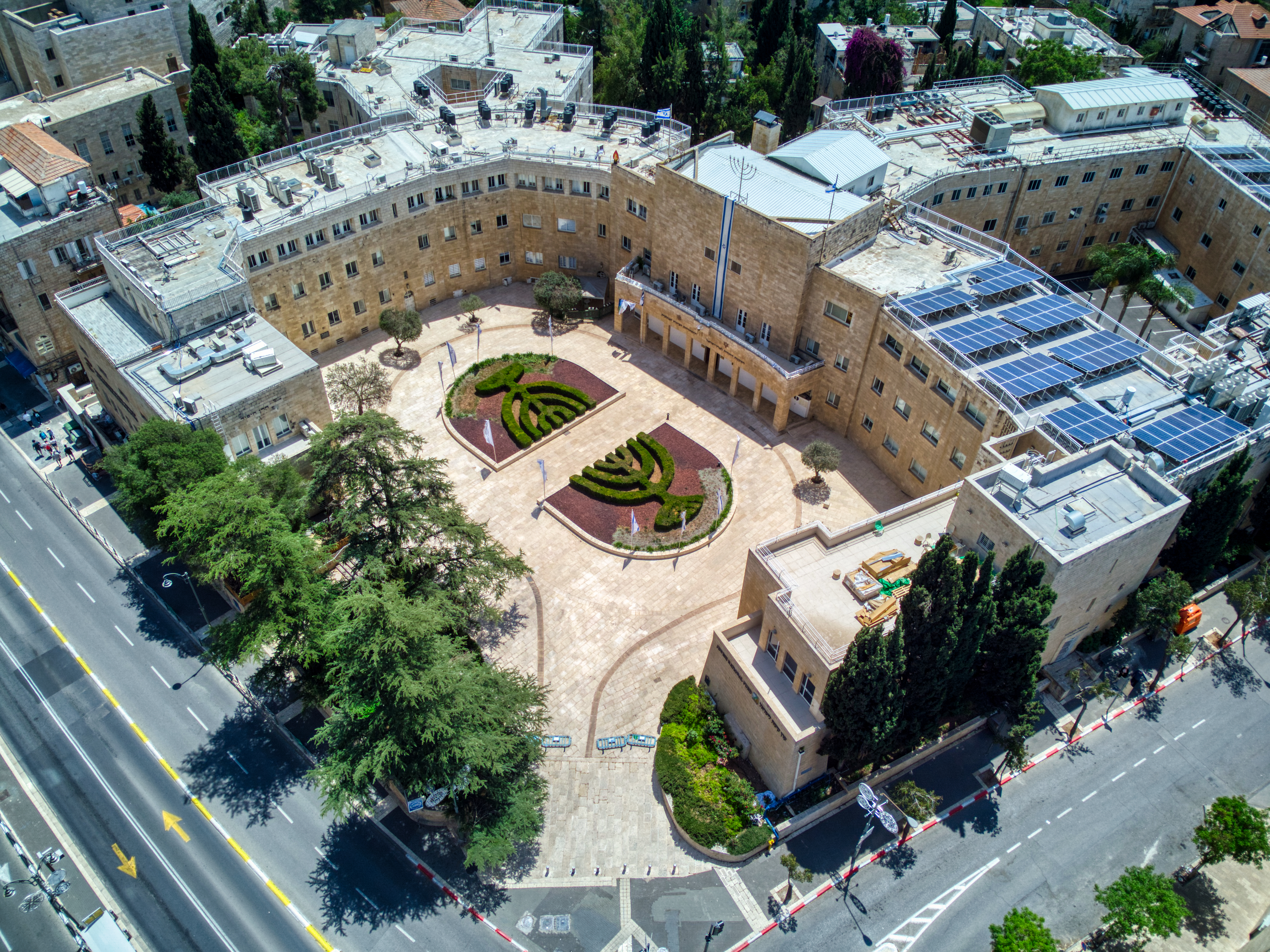

General information
- Status: Active headquarters
- Type: Government building; Landmark
- Architectural style: International Style
- Location: King George Street, Jerusalem
- Coordinates: 31.7766°N 35.2159°E
- Current tenants: World Zionist Organization; Jewish Agency for Israel; KKL-JNF; Keren Hayesod
- Construction started: 1928
- Completed: 1936
- Opened: 1930 (partial)

Design and construction
- Architect: Yohanan Ratner

The National Institutions House (Hebrew: בית המוסדות הלאומיים) is a landmark complex on King George Street in downtown Jerusalem that serves as the administrative headquarters for the national institutions of the Zionist movement. Beginning in 1930, the structure functioned as the de facto headquarters of the pre-state Jewish leadership.

The building holds profound historical significance: it was devastated in the 1948 Jewish Agency bombing, hosted the inaugural sessions of the Knesset, and served as the venue for the inauguration of Israel's first president, Chaim Weizmann. Additionally, the establishment of the State of Israel was declared on the building's balcony by members of the Provisional State Council who were besieged in Jerusalem and unable to reach Tel Aviv.

Today, the complex remains an active hub for the Jewish Agency, the World Zionist Organization, and other core national institutions, while also housing a permanent memorial to victims of antisemitism.

== Construction ==
The plot of land on which the building is located was planned by the architect Richard Kauffmann, who designed the Rehavia neighborhood, to be the site of the Hebrew Gymnasium Rehavia. Local residents preferred that the school be located within the neighborhood rather than at its edge, and so the school was built on the plot meant for the neighborhood synagogue, while the lot on King George Street was allocated to the National Institutions.

In 1927, an architectural competition was held and 37 proposals submitted. Among the presenters were architects Richard Kauffmann, Alexander Baerwald, Arieh Sharon, and Eliezer Yellin.

The leadership of the National Institutions required that the building be no more than two stories in height, that it be a single structure divided into three sections (for the Zionist Executive—composed of the World Zionist Organization and the Jewish Agency for Israel—as well as the Jewish National Fund and Keren Hayesod), and the building be well-suited to the city's character. The construction budget was £30,000 (approximately $2 million today).

The design selected was that of the architect Yohanan Ratner, who wrapped the structure around a large forecourt in order to create a formal presence while isolating it from the noise from the street, as well as to maintain the impressive facade of the building despite its lowness in comparison to surrounding structures.

Ratner designed the building in the International Style, but included elements unique to Jerusalem. The building contains outer elements similar to those of the Tower of David and the windows are reminiscent of the slits in the Old City Walls

The design was selected despite some criticism, particularly with regard to its comparatively low height. Architect Benjamin Cheikin argued that the building was too low compared to the buildings of other religious groups in Jerusalem, including the nearby Terra Sancta building.

Construction work began in 1928. Due to budgetary problems, the construction was completed in stages. The first floor of the building was dedicated in 1930, and the second story was completed in 1936.

== Memorial to Victims of Antisemitism Around the World ==
In 2008, the National Institutions House established the Memorial to Victims of Antisemitism Around the World in a Star of David shape, on which are inscribed the names of the Jews who were killed around the world in antisemitic acts. Every year in front of the memorial, there is a ceremony in memory of all Jews who were killed in antisemitic events around the world.

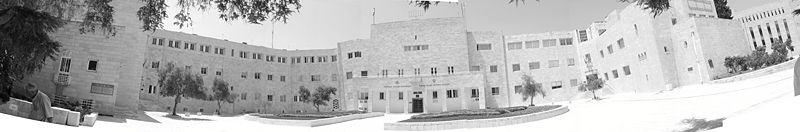
