= Attacks on civilian convoys in the 2006 Lebanon war =

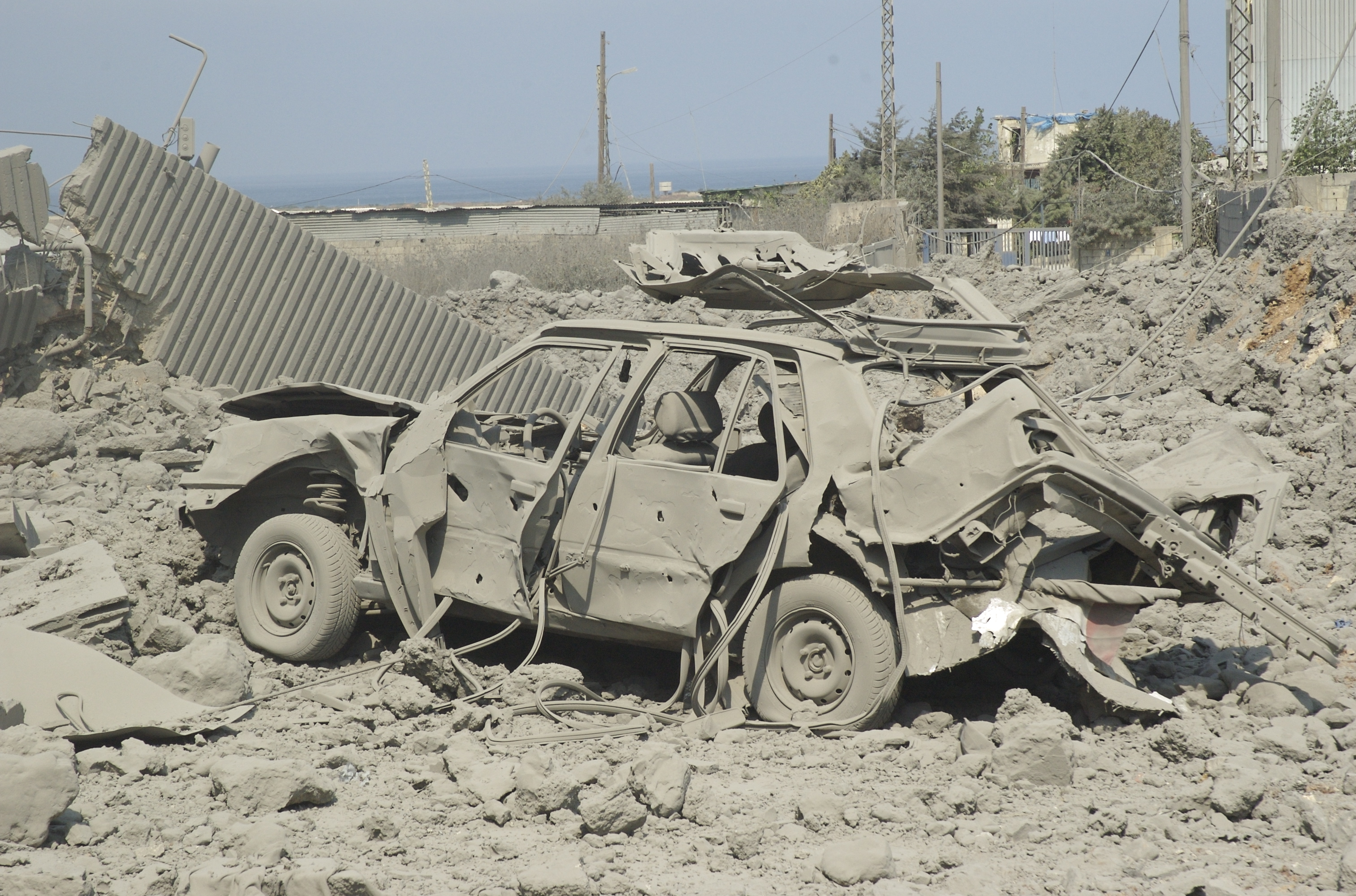
Car destroyed in an IDF attack, Beirut. Courtesy of koldo

A number of incidents of attack on civilian and UN convoys have been reported. The Israel Defense Forces has disputed involvement in some cases, and has also alleged that no prior coordination took place before some affected convoys set out. These allegations have in turn been disputed. There have also been reports that fear of aerial attack has prevented drivers from transporting humanitarian aid within Lebanon. One estimate two weeks into the conflict placed the number of Lebanese truck drivers who had died as a result of IDF/IAF air strikes on convoys as "dozens".

In their leaflet campaign, the Israelis have warned repeatedly they would consider minivans, trucks and motorcycles as targets. A UN official said: "The minivans are a target for Israel because they can take Katyusha rockets for Hezbollah, so they do not contemplate too long. They just shoot it."

Reports of attacks (this is not a comprehensive listing):

- On July 15, according to the UN, families in a convoy fleeing Marwahin were attacked by the IAF when on the coastal road to Tyre killing eighteen civilians including women and children.
- On July 18, the IDF attacked a convoy of ambulances and trucks operated by the United Arab Emirates Red Crescent (UAERC) on the road between Damascus and Beirut. One truck was destroyed, two were damaged and four passenger vehicles were damaged, causing injuries.
- On July 23, a single attack on a civilian vehicle fleeing At Tiri by an IDF missile killed three civilians and wounded sixteen. The Lebanese Red Cross in Tyre said ten vehicles carrying civilians and three or four motorcycles had been attacked by the IDF the same day making a total of forty-one injured (two critically), and three dead in attacks on convoys.
- On July 28, an aid convoy was struck by the IAF as it returned from delivering humanitarian supplies to a Lebanese village. Two people (believed to be German journalists) were reportedly injured in the attack.
- On August 6, it was reported that seventy-three bridges, seventy-two connection roads and 6,800 settlement units had been destroyed by the IDF so far according to the Lebanese Government. Also on August 6, UN troops witnessed the bombing of a civilian vehicle carrying bread as it travelled a few metres ahead of a 15 vehicle long UN convoy north of Tyre. The bombing killed two civilians.
- On August 7, five truck drivers were killed and four wounded when IAF jets bombed a convoy of trucks carrying fruits in eastern Lebanon, near the border with Syria.
- On August 11, following the billeting of IDF in the Lebanese Army base in Marjayoun a convoy of cars carrying Lebanese army, police and civilians was escorted by the UN away from the area. When the UN left the convoy at the town of Hasbaya, the convoy was bombed nine times by the IDF resulting in seven fatalities and thirty-six wounded. Head of the Lebanese Red Cross's rescue teams, George Kettaneh, said the convoy had been "deliberately targeted". *Other incidents: After an IDF leaflet drop on the town of Aitaroun it was reported that a three car convoy of residents fleeing the area, waving white flags, were attacked with bombs "10 meters in front of and behind the convoy, which raced on". On 1 August outside Hermel a pickup truck loaded with cooking gas tanks was attacked after the driver pulled over and exited the vehicle.

Aid convoys have also been prevented from accessing bombed areas to deliver aid because the IDF/IAF could not guarantee their safety from attack, or because the IDF has been engaged in bombing of the roads.

On August 1, it was reported that two out of the four border crossings to Syria had been closed due to previous IAF bombing throughout late July. Israeli Defense Minister Amir Peretz indicated that the attacks were forming part of a campaign against what he reportedly described as: "convoys smuggling weapons across the border into Lebanon" but provided no evidence of smuggling taking place. By the time of the attacks, two of the four border crossings into Syria were closed because of damage- the main Beirut-Damascus highway was described by The Jerusalem Post as "impassable" due to previous attacks.

By August 10, it was reported that all of the road bridges spanning the 90 mile Litani River had been destroyed by IDF bombing.

== Criticism of attacks on Lebanese roads and convoys ==
On July 31, the United Nations High Commissioner for Human Rights, Louise Arbour, also highlighted the destruction of roads by the IDF and alluded to a cessation of aerial bombing when she said:

"Many people are simply unable to leave southern Lebanon because they have no transport, because roads have been destroyed, because they are ill or elderly, because they must care for others who are physically unable to make the journey, or because they simply have nowhere else to go. Many thousands of civilians will still be in Southern Lebanon after the suspension of air strikes is ended"

A spokesman for the Israeli government, Avi Pazner, responding to UN Emergency Relief Co-ordinator Jan Egeland's calls for a 72-hour temporary cease-fire, said on 29 July that Israel had already opened safe corridors across Lebanon for humanitarian shipments to affected areas and claimed that Hezbollah were blocking these shipments to create a humanitarian aid crisis:

"The problem is completely different. It is Hezbollah who is deliberately preventing the transfer of medical aid and of food to the population of southern Lebanon in order to create a humanitarian crisis, which they want to blame Israel for"

Pazner provided no evidence for his claim and it was completely dismissed by UN humanitarian coordinator in Lebanon, Mona Hammam, who said that convoys had encountered "no problems" from the Hezbollah side.

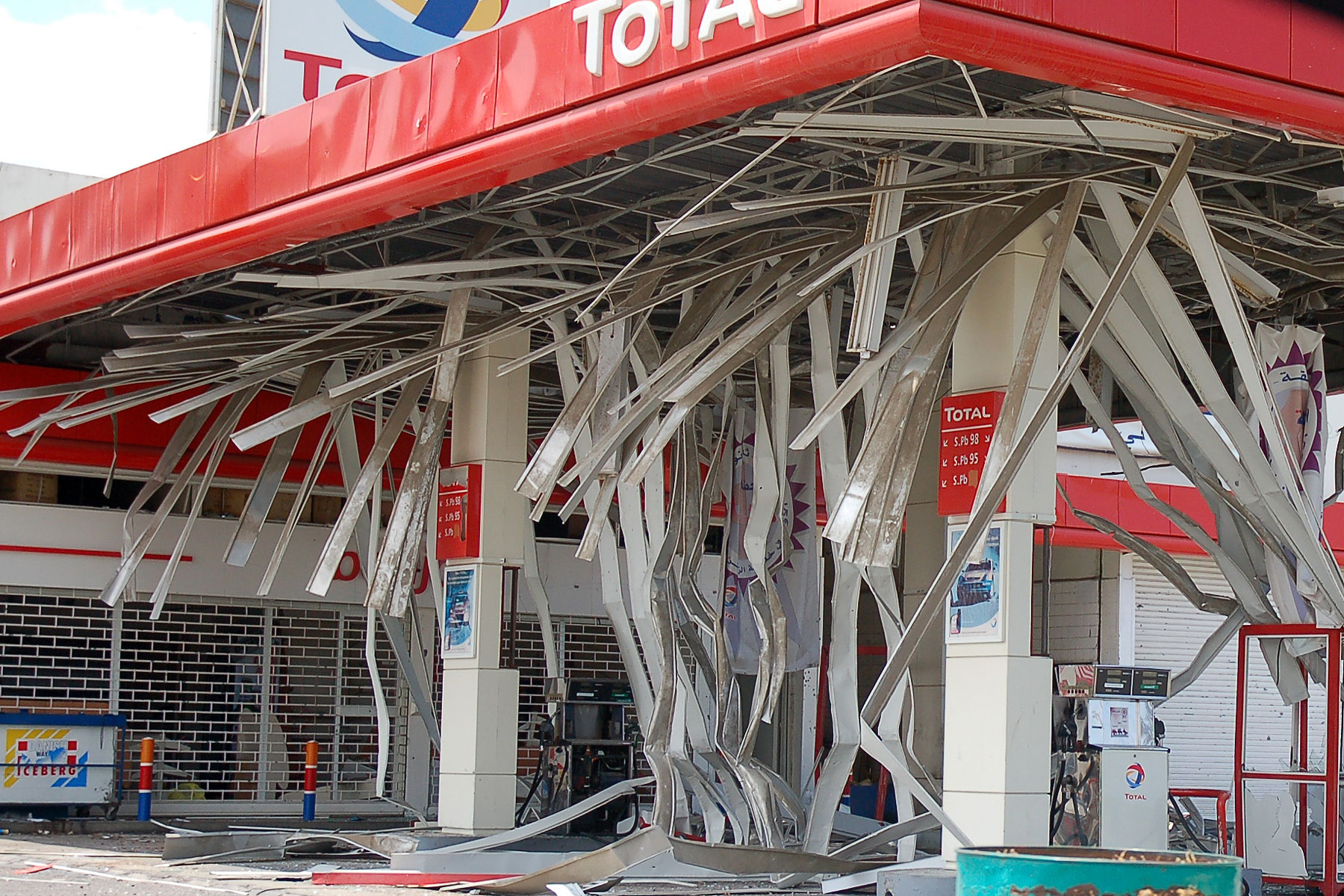
Aftermath of IDF attack on a gas station in South Lebanon. Photo courtesy of Masser

This assessment was reiterated on August 11 by UN Under-Secretary-General for Humanitarian Affairs and emergency relief, Jan Egeland, who reported:"Hezbollah has not denied us access.. I have heard some reports which I cannot confirm that they have prevented civilians from leaving the area, but they have not denied us access in." Criticism of IDF attacks on roads has also been voiced by UN staff in the region of South Lebanon who claim that IDF bombing of roads is making it impossible for people to flee the fighting. According to a UN spokesman in the area of Naqoura on 24 July: "All the smaller roads leading to the coastal roads are destroyed ... In some areas you have people pushing cars by hand through obstacles made by a rocket or a bomb." While the IDF has allowed the entrance of some ships carrying aid to Lebanon, it is reported that international agencies have not received guarantees from the Israeli government for, "the safe civilian passage to and from the southernmost bombed Hezbollah zones in Lebanon". For example, Shaista Aziz of aid agency Oxfam was reported to have said on 30 July:

"The Oxfam rapid response team only managed to get in yesterday... The reason was lack of security- the bombing. We have still been unable to get our aid workers to the south where they are desperately needed. We have to think extremely carefully about where we go and in what vehicles, because the Israelis are attacking vehicles over a certain length. It means that only 20 tonnes at a time is getting moved. On the Syrian border the World Food Programme is being forced to unload trucks of aid into smaller vehicles for safety."

On August 11, it was reported that the IDF was preventing access to aid ships at the port of Tyre. This was following the previous IDF announcement that the IDF would bomb any vehicles on the roads in the Tyre area. The IDF decision to stall the aid for nine days off the coast of Lebanon was criticised by Roland Huguenin, a spokesman for the International Committee of the Red Cross.

Attacks on bridges, particularly attacks on highways/bridges linking Lebanon to Syria ongoing through July but increased around August 1, prevented an eight-truck convoy carrying food and other humanitarian aid from reaching an estimated "400,000 people living with host families or in schools and parks in" Lebanon on August 4.

== Cost of attacks on Lebanese road network ==
The Lebanese Centre for Economic Research estimated total repair and reconstruction costs rising to $7 Billion US. Repairs to roads, bridges ports and airports, was estimated at $404m. Initial figures were that 94 roads and 70 bridges were bombed by the IDF.
