= Hagoel =

Hagoel (Hebrew: חגואל or הגואל) is a surname. Notable people with the surname include:

- Evelin Hagoel (born 1961), Israeli actress
- Yaakov Hagoel (born 1971), Israeli official and chairman of the World Zionist Organization

== See also ==
- Hachuel
- Goel (Judaism)
