= Tova Dorfman =

Israeli communal leader

Tova Dorfman is an Israeli-American communal leader who was the president of the World Zionist Organization from 2023 to 2025. She is the first woman to hold this position.

== Early life ==
Born in Jaffa, Israel, Dorfman grew up in Oak Park, Michigan, and studied at the University of California.

== Career ==
After making Aliyah in 1984, Dorfman started working at Melitz - the Center for Jewish Zionist Education in Jerusalem. Following this, she directed the Israel and Overseas Dept of the Jewish Federation of Metro Detroit. Currently, Dorfman is the CEO of the Steinhardt Family Foundation in Israel.

== Community leadership ==
In 2021 Dorfman was elected Deputy Chair of the World Zionist Organization as well as chair of the Department for Israel and Holocaust Commemoration Worldwide. In January 2023, Dorfman was elected President of the World Zionist Organization. She also served as chairman of the Herzl Center, associate chairman of the Foundations Forum in Israel, and managed the Israel and Foreign Department of the Jewish Federation of Detroit. Dorfman was a founding member of Yesh Atid. Dorfman has written for a number of publications such as Times of Israel, JNS, Jerusalem Post, Hadassah Magazine.

== Personal ==
Dorfman is married to Dr. Raviv Schwartz, has two sons and lives outside Tel Aviv.
