= Sam Grundwerg =

American-born Israeli diplomat (born 1973)

Samuel (Sam) Grundwerg
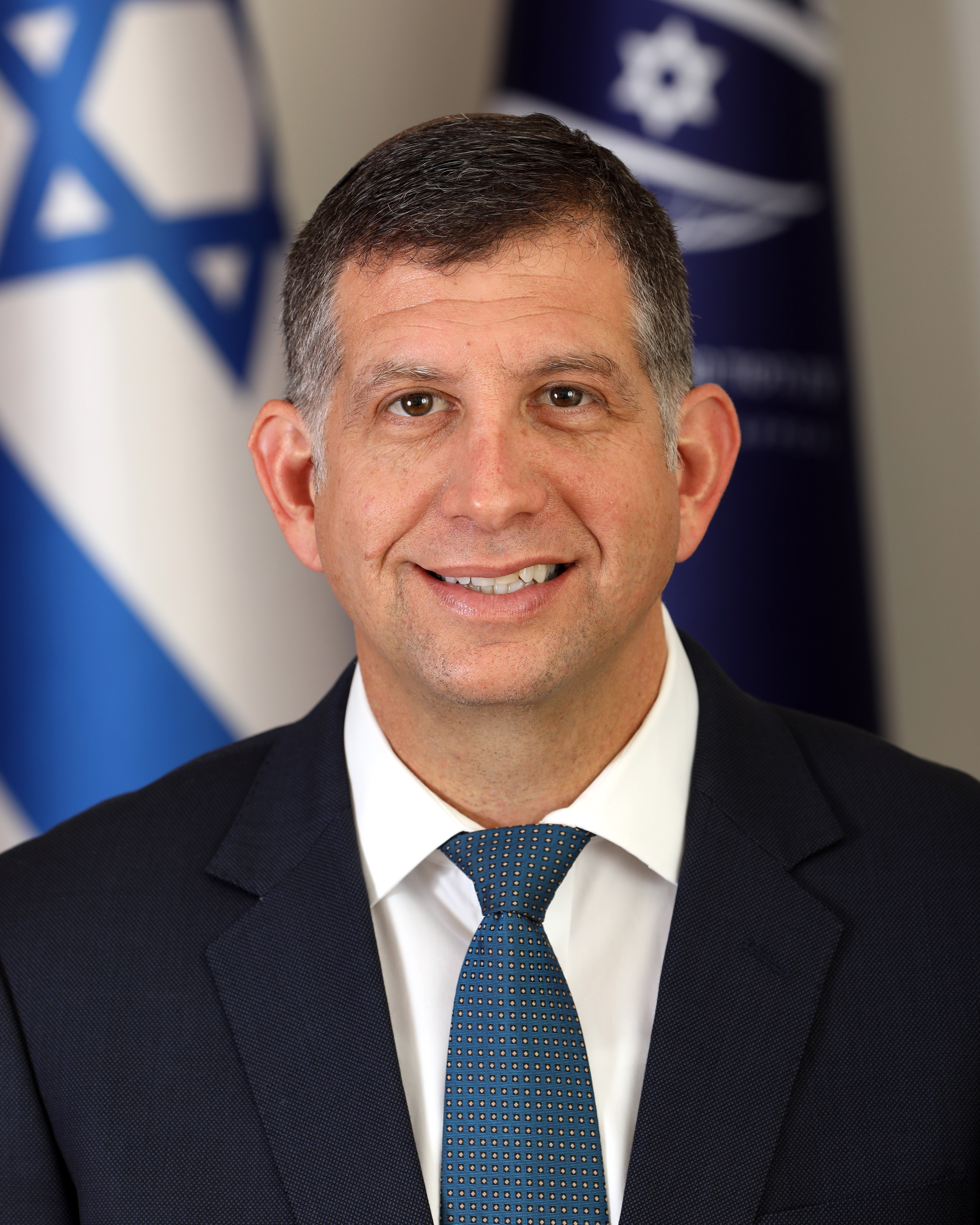
- Sam Grundwerg
- Born: February 12, 1973 (age 53); Miami, Florida
- Occupations: World chairman, Keren Hayesod-United Israel Appeal
- Years active: 2018 - present

Sam Grundwerg (born 1973) is an American-born Israeli diplomat, public figure and attorney. He has served as World Chairman of Keren Hayesod–United Israel Appeal since December 2018. Prior to this, he was Consul General of Israel in Los Angeles, representing Israel to the southwestern United States. Grundwerg was recognized twice as one the Jerusalem Post's “50 most influential Jews.”

== Biography ==
Samuel (“Sam”) Grundwerg was born in Miami Beach, Florida to a Modern Orthodox Jewish family. He attended the Hebrew Academy Jewish day school in Miami Beach, where he became friends with Ron Dermer, advisor of Israeli prime minister Benjamin Netanyahu and former Israeli ambassador to the United States, now Israel's Minister of Strategic Affairs. In 1990, Grundwerg spent a gap year in Israel at a yeshiva. In 1992, he enlisted in the Israel Defense Forces (IDF) as a lone soldier, serving as a combat soldier in the Armored Corps. He continues to serve as an officer in the reserves as a casualty officer.

Grundwerg holds a Juris Doctor (J.D.) degree from the University of Miami School of Law, an M.B.A. in finance from the University of Miami School of Business, and a B.A. from Bar-Ilan University.

Grundwerg is married to Julia, a nurse born in Puerto Rico to a family originally from Syria, with whom he has three children. The family lives in Efrat, a community in Gush Etzion.

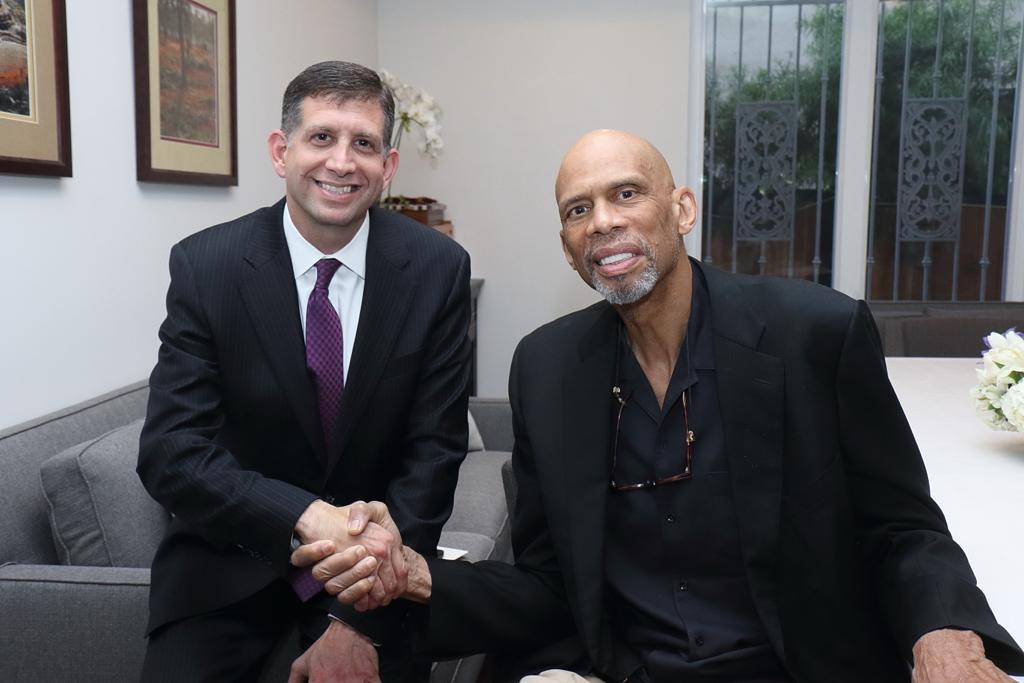
Sam Grundwerg with Kareem Abdul-Jabbar

== Legal career ==
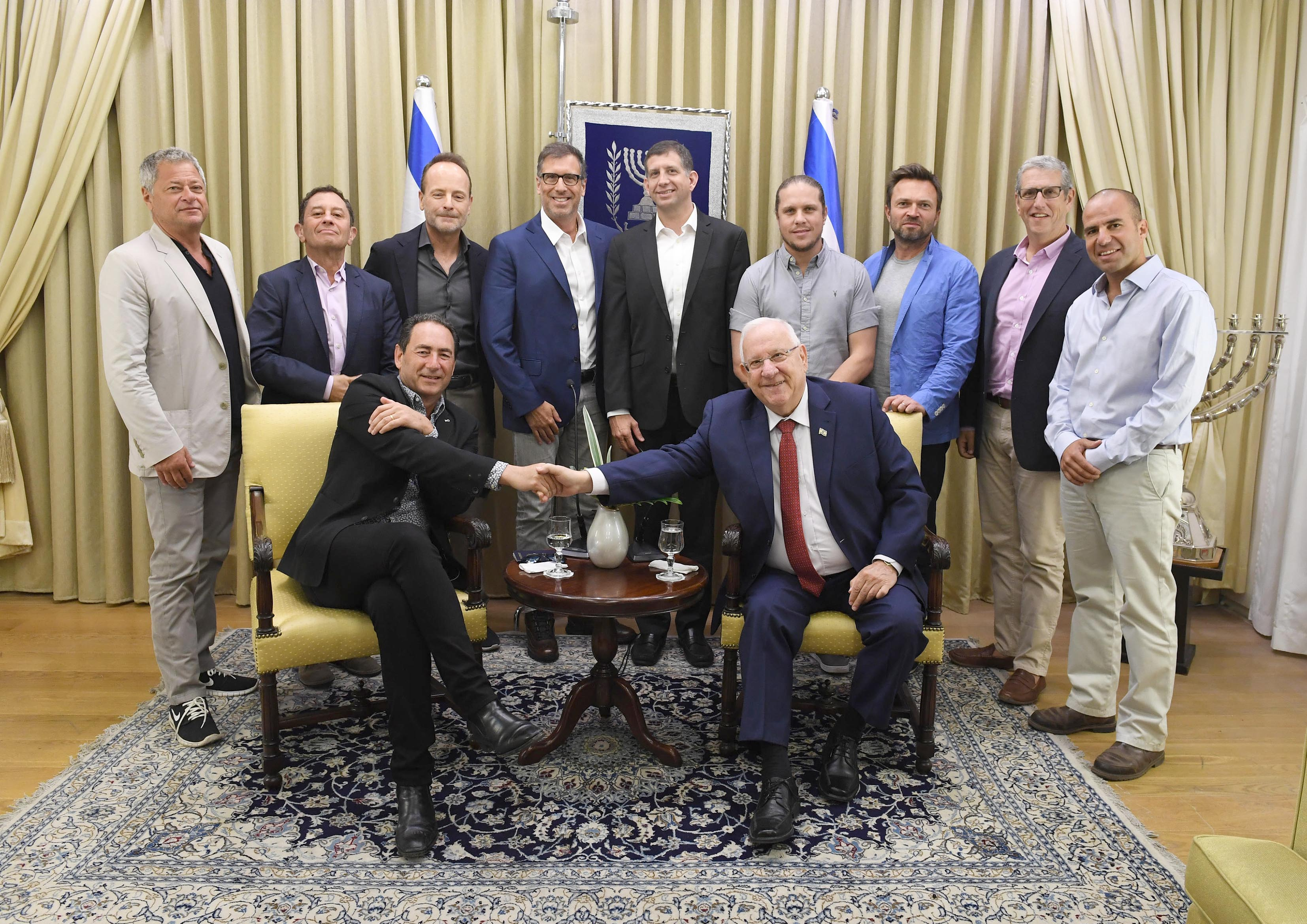
Sam Grundwerg with Israeli President Reuven Rivlin and a film industry delegation from Hollywood, September 2017

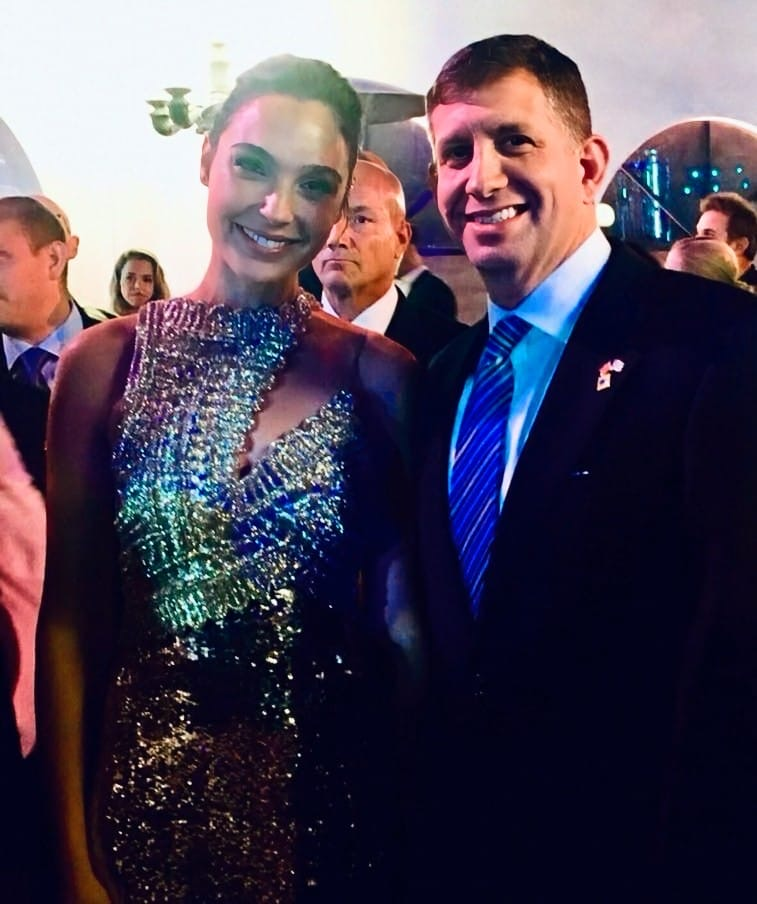
Sam Grundwerg with Gal Gadot

In the United States, Grundwerg worked for the international law firm, Greenberg Traurig as a real-estate attorney. He has also held senior finance roles in Thomson Media Group and Strauss Dairies in Petah Tikva.

== Organizational and diplomatic career ==
=== World Jewish Congress ===
Grundwerg joined the World Jewish Congress in 2010 under the presidency of Ronald S. Lauder. He was appointed director-general of its Israeli branch, which serves as a liaison between Jewish communities around the world and Israeli institutions.

=== Israeli consul-general ===
In 2016, Grundwerg was appointed Israel's Consul-General in Los Angeles. During his tenure, he led efforts to engage with the Hollywood establishment and create a more positive image of Israel. Together with music and entertainment personality David Fishof, founder of Rock 'n Roll Fantasy Camp, Grundwerg oversaw the production of the Independence Day celebration for Israel's 70th anniversary at Universal Studios. He was also involved in pitching Israeli television to U.S. markets, and succeeded in having an episode of Conan O'Brien's travel show “Conan Without Borders” filmed in Israel.

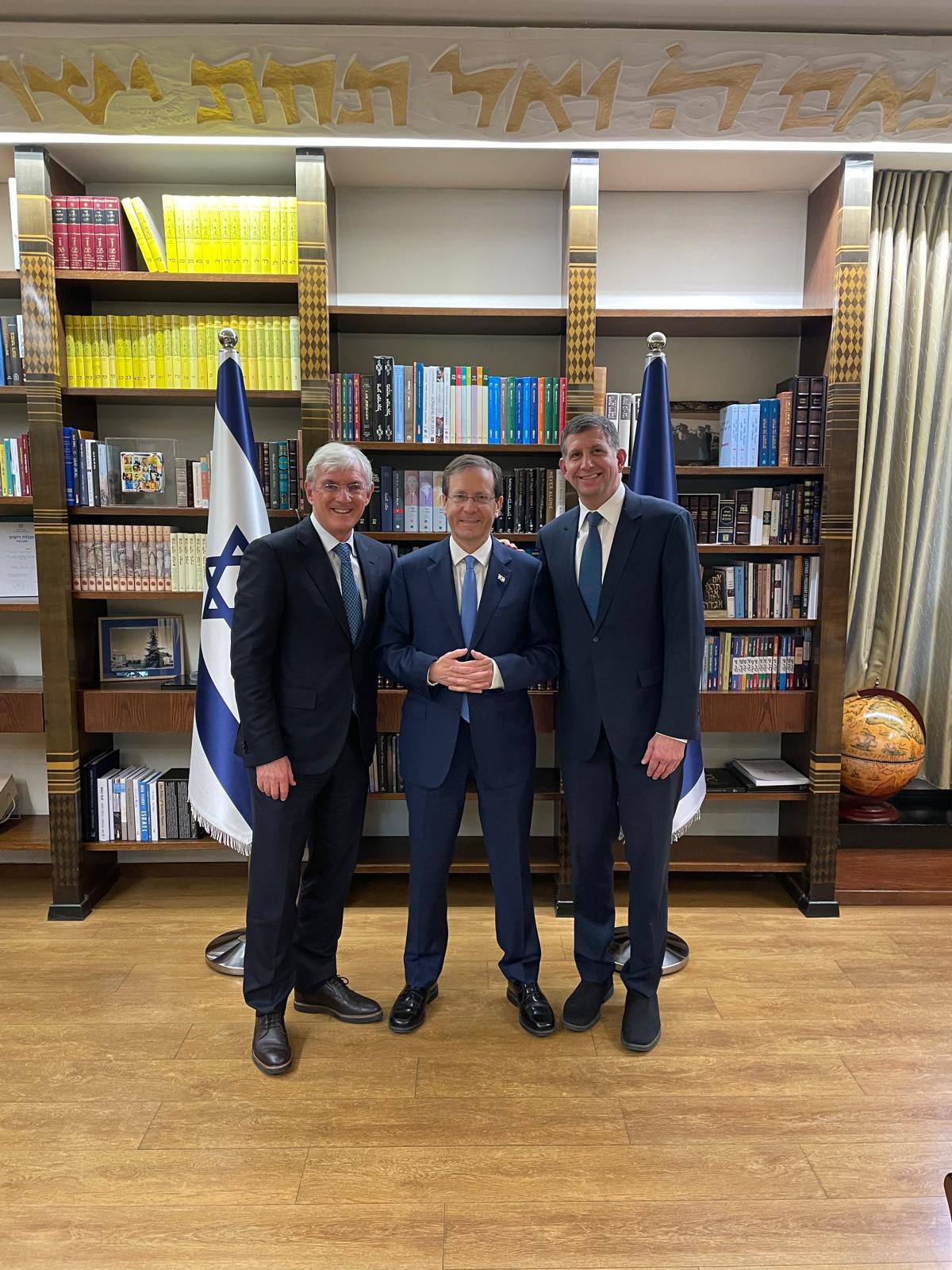
Sam Grundwerg with Israeli president Isaac Herzog and Steven Lowy, 2021

While in Los Angeles, Grundwerg hosted events with many stars, including Gal Gadot, Billy Crystal, Mayim Bialik and Sharon Stone. In 2017, an event he organized at the Israeli consulate in Los Angeles marking Ramadan featured a discussion with Kareem Abdul-Jabbar on the importance of Muslim-Jewish relations and cross-cultural exchange.

=== World Chair of Keren Hayesod ===
In 2018, Grundwerg was appointed World Chairman of Keren Hayesod-United Israel Appeal, the “fundraising arm of the Zionist movement,” with branches in 45 countries.

Under Grundwerg, Keren Hayesod raised money for a field hospital in Ukraine and organized an emergency aliyah campaign. Keren Hayesod also launched Operation Tzur Yisrael (Rock of Israel), a fundraising campaign to bring 5,000 Ethiopian Jewish immigrants to Israel, in some cases reuniting families that have been separated for 20-30 years.

Since the Russian invasion of Ukraine in February 2022, Grundwerg has worked closely with Steven Lowy, chairman of the Board of Trustees, and Keren Hayesod's partner organizations, to expedite the aliyah of Ukrainian Jews affected by the fighting.

Following the October 7 attacks, Keren Hayesod established Brother's Keeper, an emergency campaign that raised $170 million to provide direct aid to communities in northern and southern Israel, hospitals, rehabilitation centers and NGOs involved in the war effort.

== Awards and recognition ==
For two years in a row, 2022 and 2023, Grundwerg was on the list of the Jerusalem Post's 50 most influential Jews.
