= Leib Yaffe =

- אריה לייב יפה
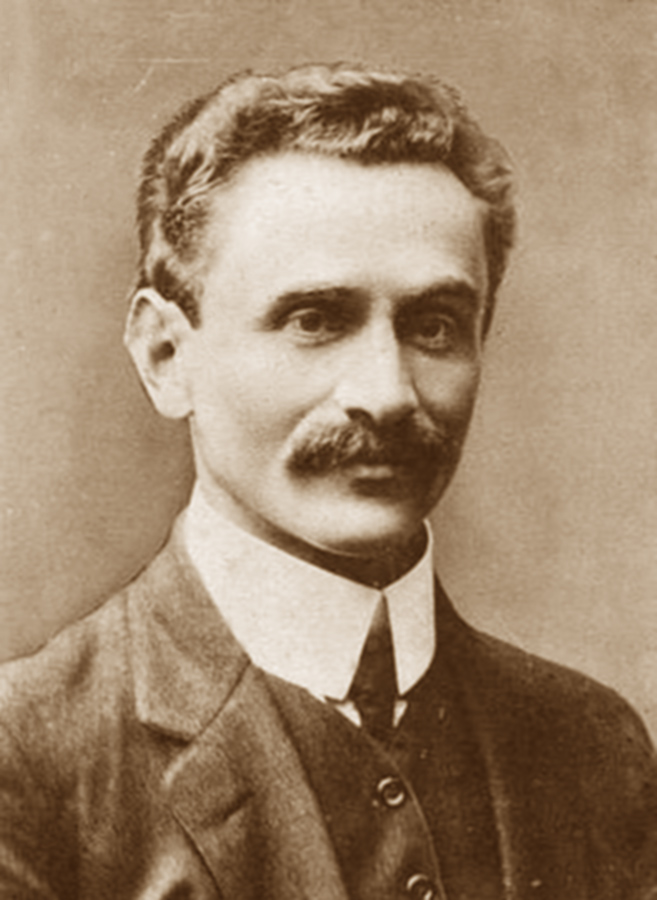
- Leib Yaffe
- Born: Aryeh Leib Yaffe; June 5, 1876; Grodno, Belarus
- Died: March 11, 1948 (aged 71); Jerusalem, Mandatory Palestine
- Cause of death: Assassination (car bomb)
- Education: Universities in Germany
- Occupations: Poet, journalist, editor, Zionist leader
- Organizations: Haaretz, Keren Hayesod
- Known for: Director-general of Keren Hayesod, editor of Haaretz
- Movement: Zionism

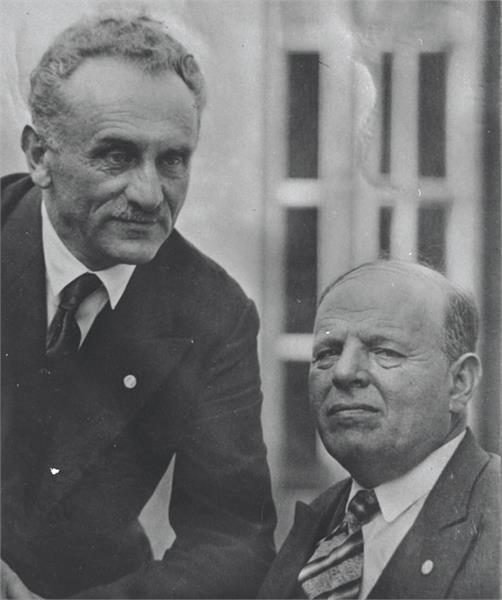
Leib Yaffe with Hayim Bialik

Aryeh Leib Yaffe (Hebrew: אריה לייב יפה; June 5, 1876 – March 11, 1948) was a Hebrew poet, journalist and editor of Haaretz newspaper.

Leib Yaffe was born in Grodno, Belarus. He spent his university years in Germany. A life-long champion of the Zionist cause, he immigrated to Palestine in 1920, where he became chief editor of Haaretz. He founded and served as director-general of Keren Hayesod. In 1924, he visited Pinsk to promote the Zionist cause, and received a warm welcome from the Jewish community there.

In 1942, he was sent on a mission to South America, and in December of that year he traveled to United States as an emissary of the Zionist Movement.

On March 11, 1948, he and 12 others were killed by a car bomb detonated by a Palestinian Arab—with Arab snipers then firing upon victims and rescuers—in the courtyard of the Jewish Agency building in Jerusalem.

There are streets named after him in Jerusalem's Talpiot neighborhood, in Herzliya, and in Beersheba.
