= 1948 Jewish Agency bombing =

- Part of 1947–1948 civil war in Mandatory Palestine
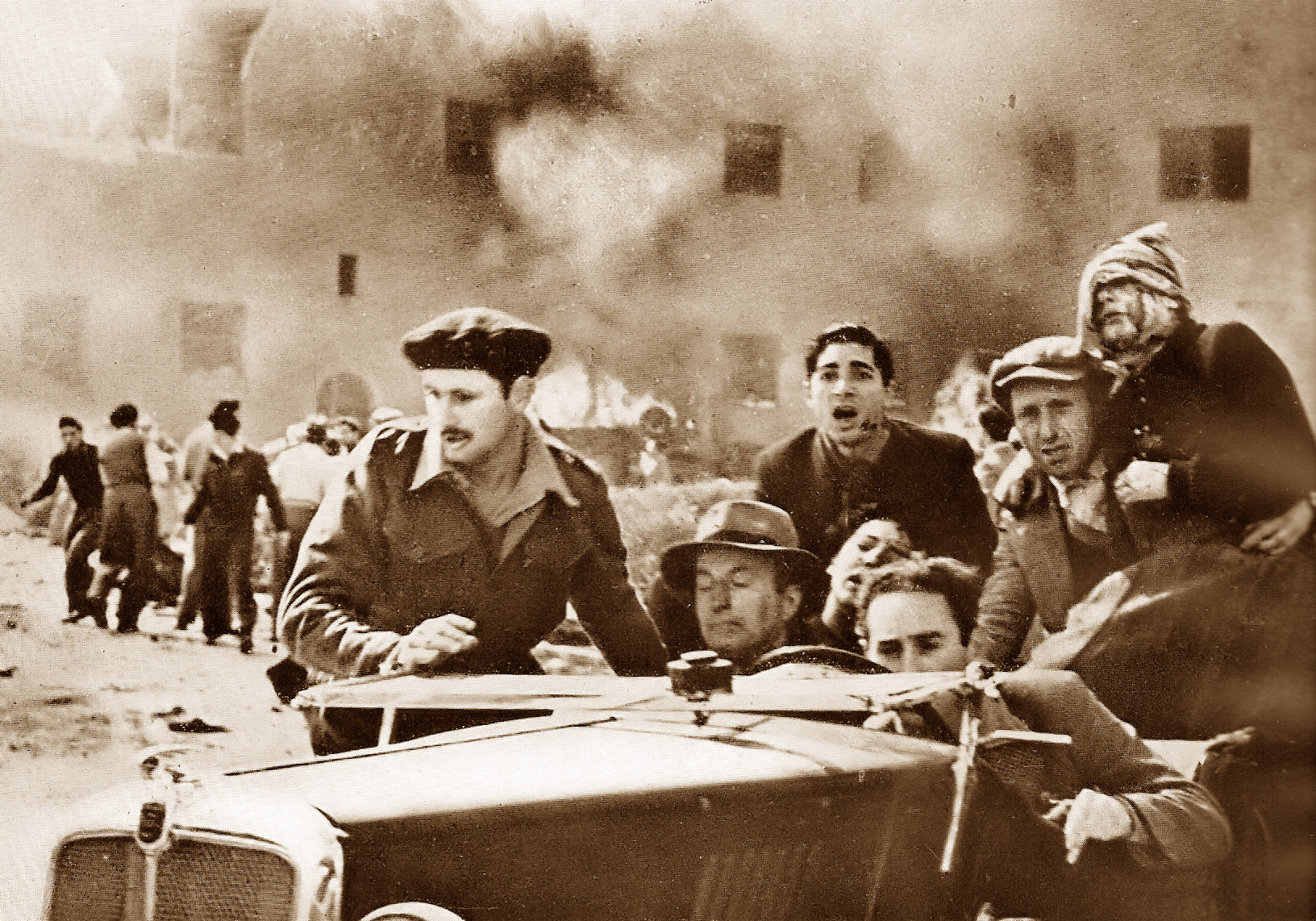
- Location: National Institutions House, Jerusalem
- Date: March 11, 1948
- Target: Jewish Agency
- Attack type: car bombing
- Deaths: 12
- Injuries: 86
- Perpetrator: Arab nationalist forces

The 1948 Jewish Agency bombing was a terrorist attack on March 11, 1948, that killed 12 people and injured 86 more when a car bomb exploded in the courtyard of the National Institutions House in Jerusalem. The complex housed the headquarters of the Jewish Agency and other Zionist organs.

The attack was carried out by Arab nationalist forces. Anton Daoud, an Arab Christian employed as a chauffeur at the American consulate, drove the vehicle into the courtyard and departed before the device, rigged by demolition expert Fawzi al-Qutb, detonated.

The bombing killed Keren Hayesod head Leib Yaffe, and caused significant structural damage to the building. The attack occurred during a period of escalating violence leading up to the 1948 Arab–Israeli War.
