= Yaakov Hagoel =

Chairman of the World Zionist Organization

- יעקב חגואל
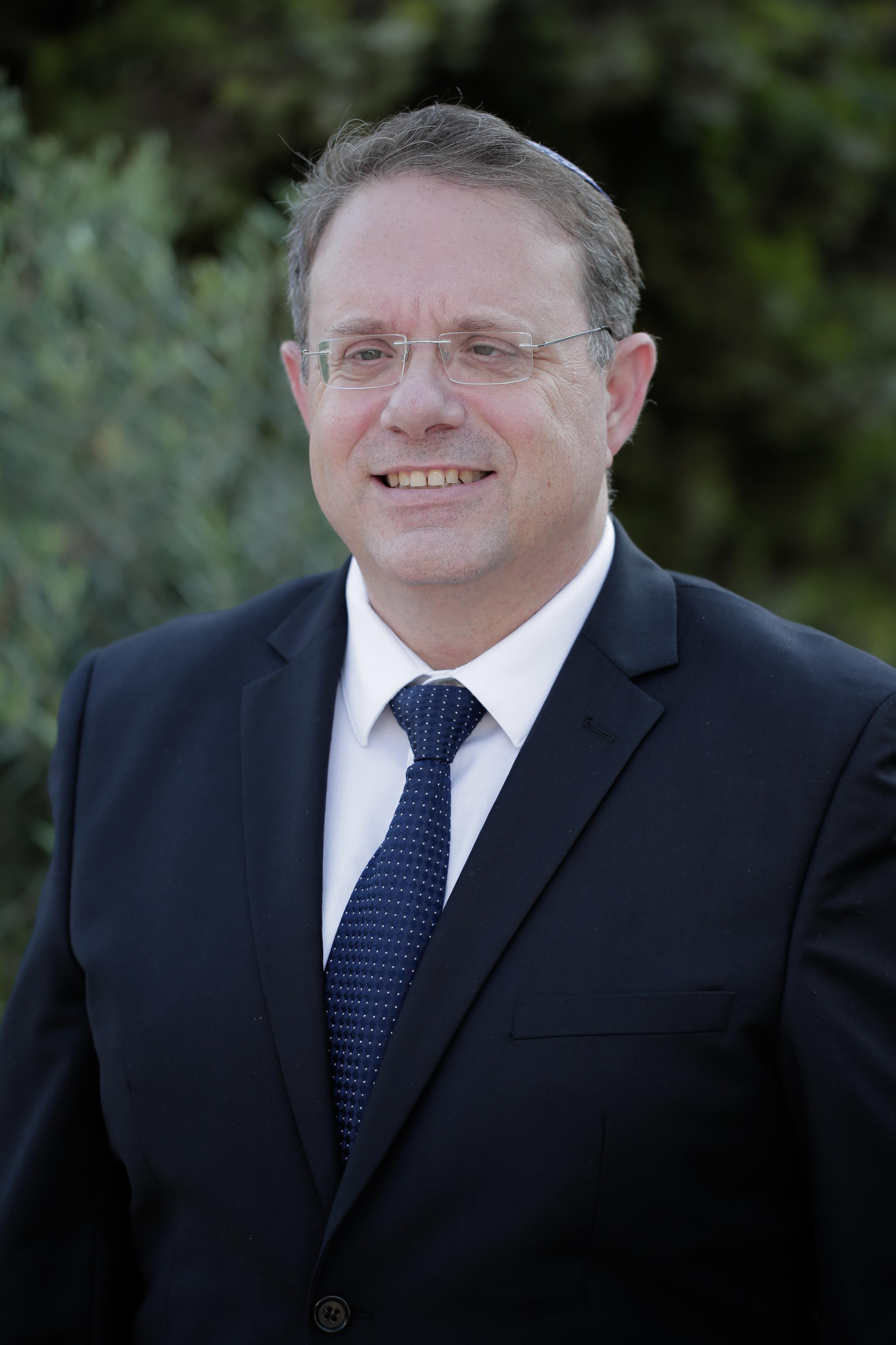
- Yaakov Hagoel in 2018

Chairman of the World Zionist Organization
- Incumbent
- Assumed office October 2020
- Preceded by: Avraham Duvdevani

Personal details
- Born: February 19, 1971 (age 55) Tel Aviv, Israel
- Education: Ono Academic College

Yaakov Hagoel (Hebrew: יעקב חגואל; born February 19, 1971), is the Chairman of the Executive of the World Zionist Organization. He was formerly acting chairman of The Jewish Agency for Israel.

Between 2015 - 2020 Hagoel served as the Vice Chairman of the WZO. He was also the Head of the WZO's Department of Activities in Israel and Countering Antisemitism. Hagoel was listed as one of the world's most influential Jews by the Jerusalem Post in 2020, 2022 and 2024.

== World Zionist Organization ==
Hagoel was reelected head of the World Zionist Organization in November 2025 along with Doron Perez. The two will share duties as chairman. Hagoel has served as chairman since his election in 2020. He previously served as Vice Chairman since 2015, and was head of the WZO's Department for Activities in Israel & Countering Antisemitism since 2010, a department he founded.

Hagoel has met with numerous heads of state from around the world and have spoken in many countries. Hagoel has worked closely with the American Zionist Movement, the Zionist Federation of Great Britain and organizations around the world on issues of anti-Israel bias and Judeo-phobia.

In 2018, he co-chaired a conference in the US in the wake of the deadly shooting at a Pittsburgh synagogue. In August 2020, Hagoel, together with Member of Knesset David Bitan, met with representatives of Facebook, Twitter and YouTube to establish a team to handle the rise of Antisemitic content in social media.

He initiated having Jewish victims of anti-Jewish attacks abroad be commemorated along with victims of terrorism in Israel during Memorial Day. In 2022 he oversaw the 125th anniversary of the First Zionist Congress in Basel, Switzerland. This included meeting with dignitaries from European and Arab countries.

Following the October 7th massacre, he organized housing for displaced Israeli civilians and facilitated support to returning hostages and family members. He arranged the Jewish People Challenges Conference in Jerusalem which brought together of 500 Jewish leaders from 38 nations to discuses the response to the Iron Swords War.

== Early life ==
Hagoel was born in 1971 in Tel Aviv. He is Sephardic on his father's side from Greek and Turkish descent and Ashkenazic on his mother's side from Polish descent. He was a member of the Betar youth movement and as an adult, served as treasurer and later Executive CEO of World Betar. Before serving in the Israel Defense Forces, he volunteered for a year in the southern city of Ofakim. During his military service, he served in the Nahal unit. Following his regular service, he joined the army reserves in the Gaza Division. He studied law at the Ono Academic College and earned an LL.B.

== Professional career ==
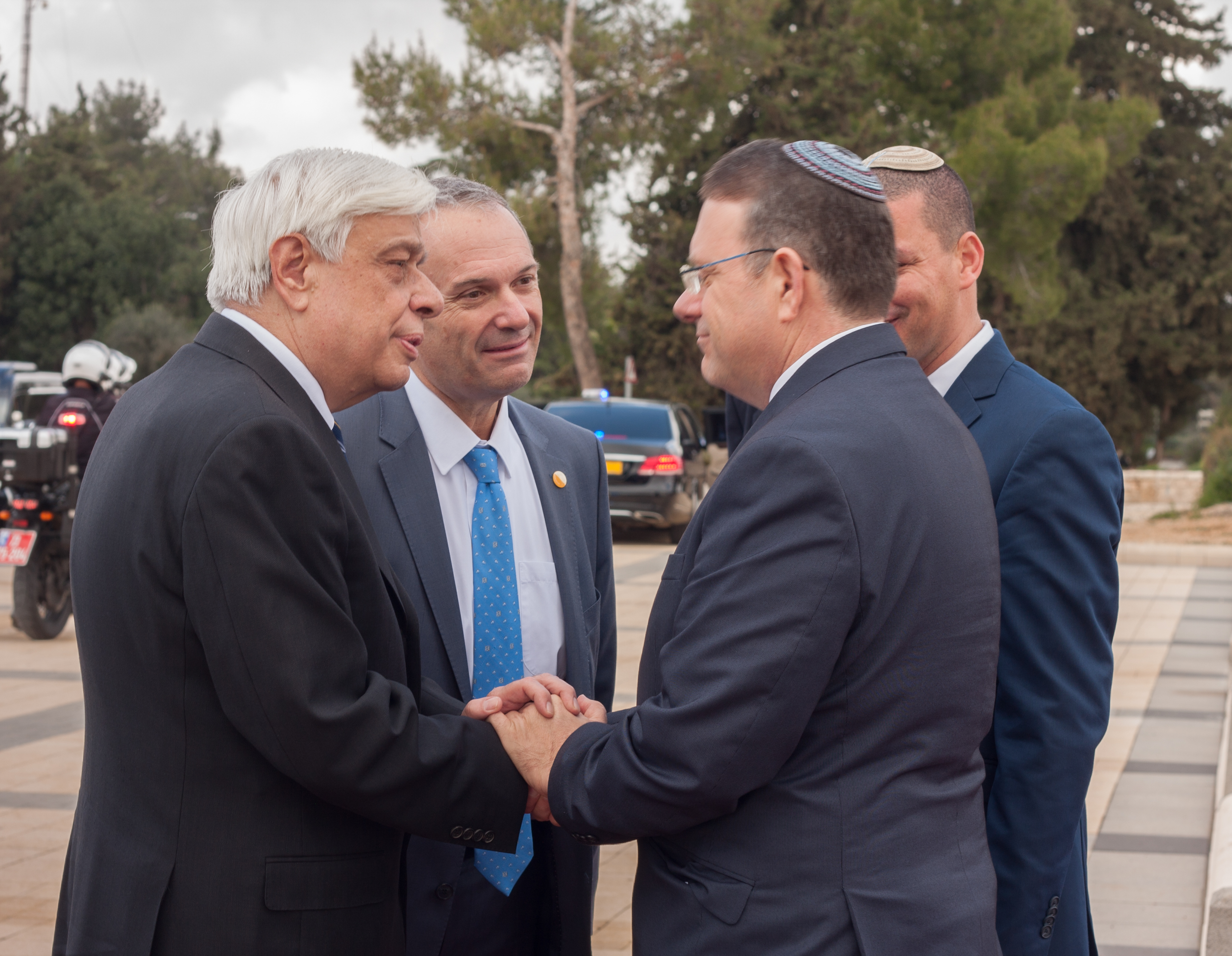
Yaakov Hagoel welcomes Greek President Prokopis Pavlopoulos on Mount Herzl, March 2016.

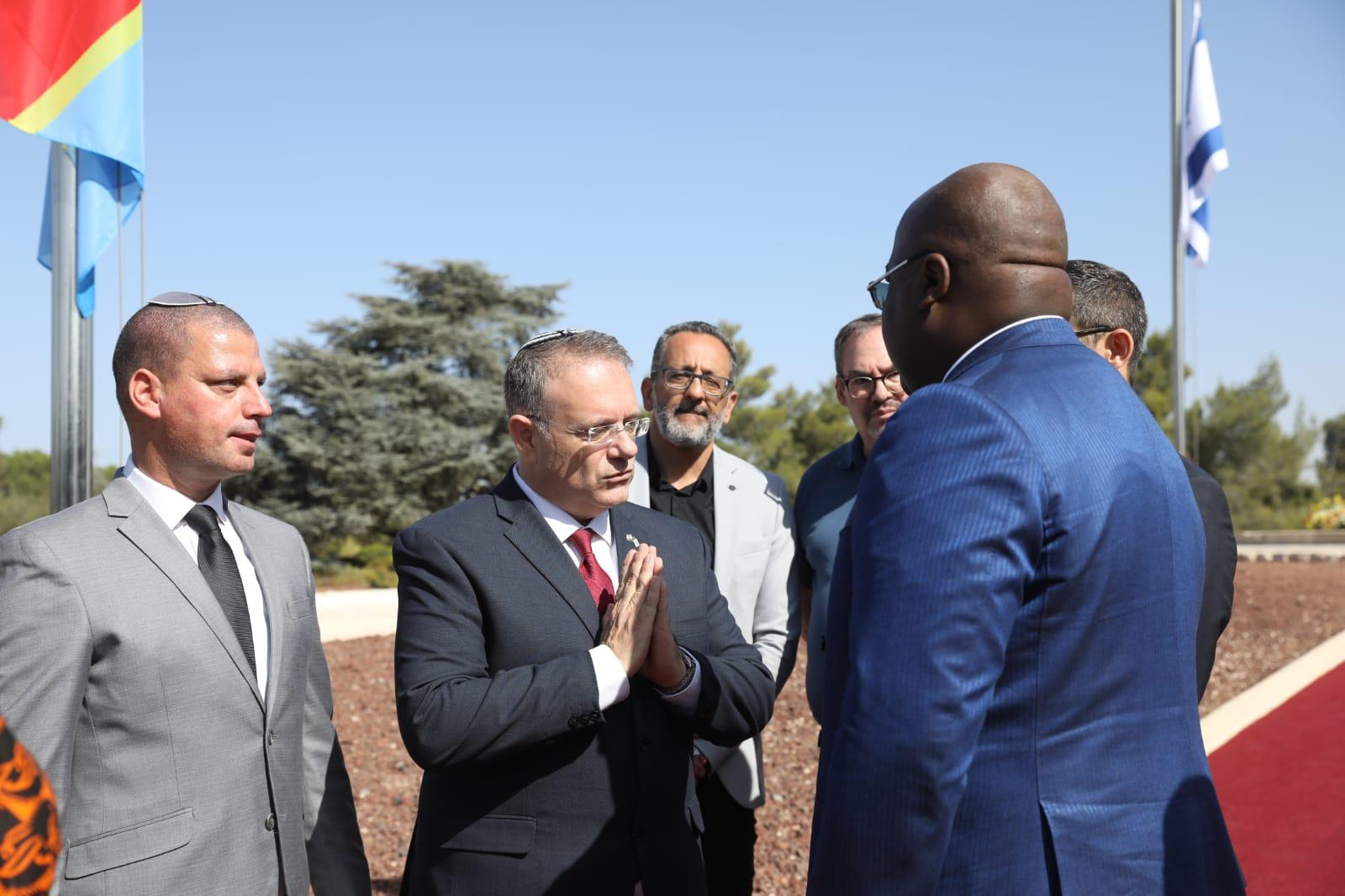
Yaakov Hagoel meeting President of the Democratic Republic of the Congo Félix Tshisekedi October, 2021.

Hagoel served as chairman of the Council of World Zionist Youth Movements, presidium member of the Zionist Executive Committee, member of the WZO Finance Committee and executive CEO of the World Leadership of the Betar Movement. He has been a member of the Board of Trustees of the Jewish Agency since 2010. Additionally, Hagoel serves as co-chair of the Task Force on Countering Antisemitism of the Jewish Agency's Board of Trustees, a member of the Board of Governors of Keren Hayesod—United Israel Appeal, and a member of the Herzl Council and the Jabostinky Council of the Israeli Prime Minister's Office. He also serves as a member of Executive Committee of the Ariel University. In 2011 Hagoel was elected to serve as a member of the Yad Vashem Council. Hagoel was Chairman of World Likud from 2015 - 2020. In 2022, he was appointed as a member of the National Council for Planning and Construction and a member of the Subcommittee for Principled Planning.

In July 2017, Hagoel initiated an amendment to the Knesset's Herzl Law to fund the Herzl Museum and the Mount Herzl Educational Center. He worked to have the graves of Theodor Herzl grandparents reinterred at the Mount Herzl cemetery.

=== Jewish Agency ===
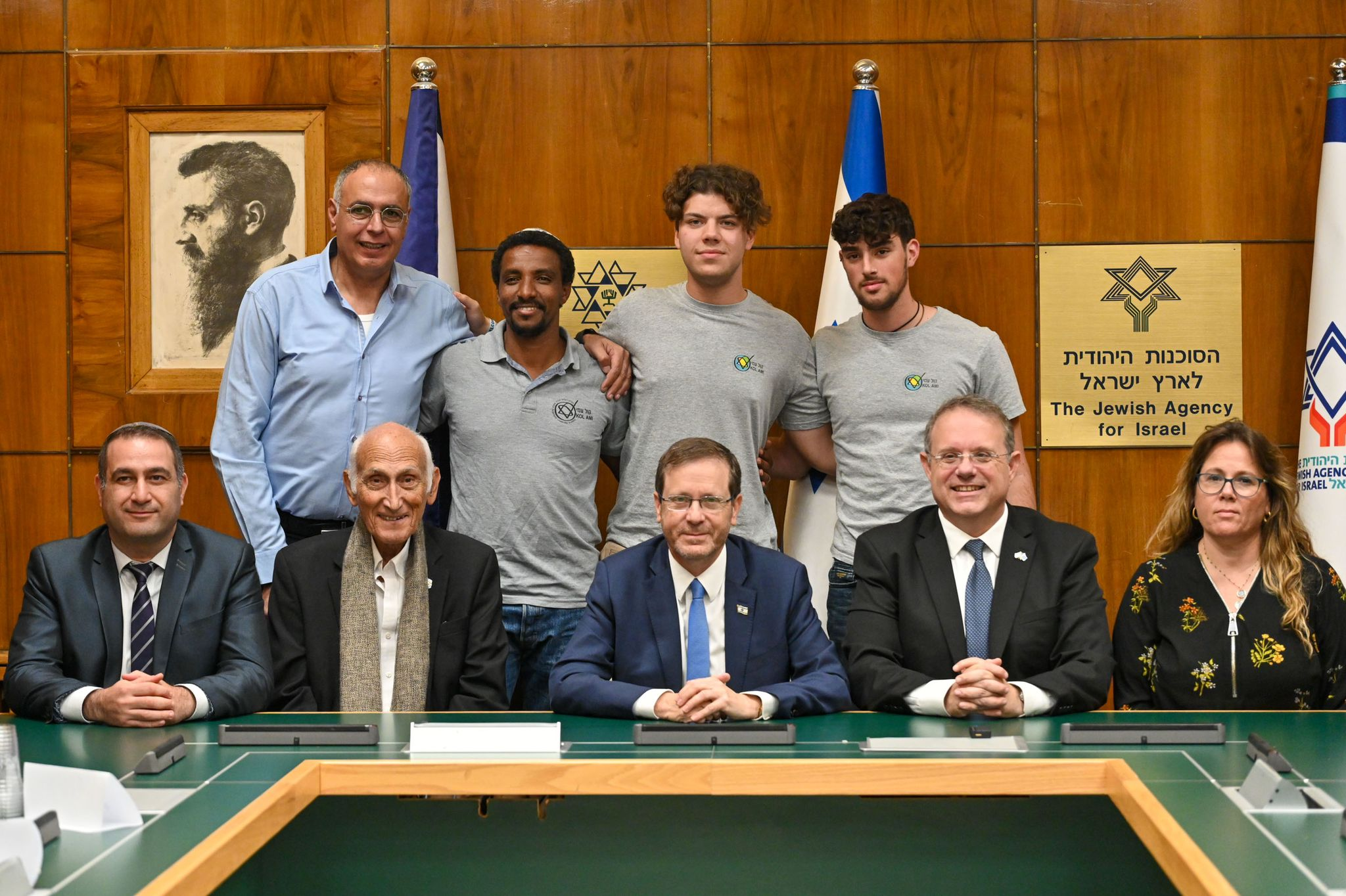
President Isaac Herzog, Yaakov Hagoel and others at the 75th anniversary of the UN decision to establish a Jewish state in the Land of Israel.

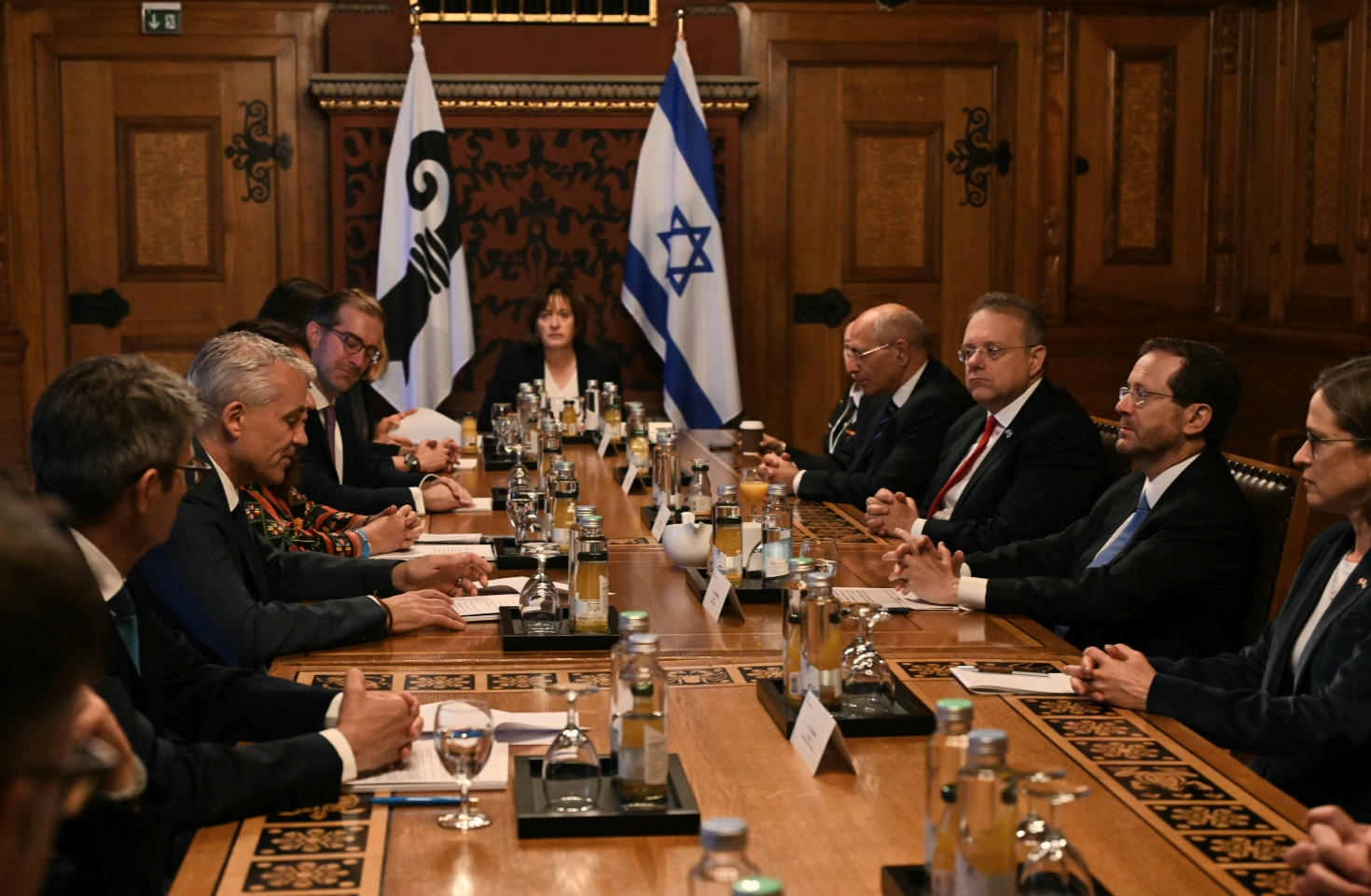
Yaakov Hagoel joins President Isaac Herzog in Switzerland, August 2022.

In July 2021, Hagoel was elected by the Jewish Agency's management to serve as acting chairman of the Jewish Agency. Hagoel replaced Isaac Herzog who left the chairmanship to assume duties as President of Israel. Hagoel served in this position until Doron Almog took office on August 21, 2022. During this period he oversaw rescue operations for Jews fleeing the Russia-Ukraine War, and navigated Israel's response to the COVID-19 pandemic.

== Personal life ==
Hagoel lives in Netanya and is married to Tehiya with four children.
