= World Zionist Organization =

Non-governmental organization

- הַהִסְתַּדְּרוּת הַצִּיּוֹנִית הָעוֹלָמִית
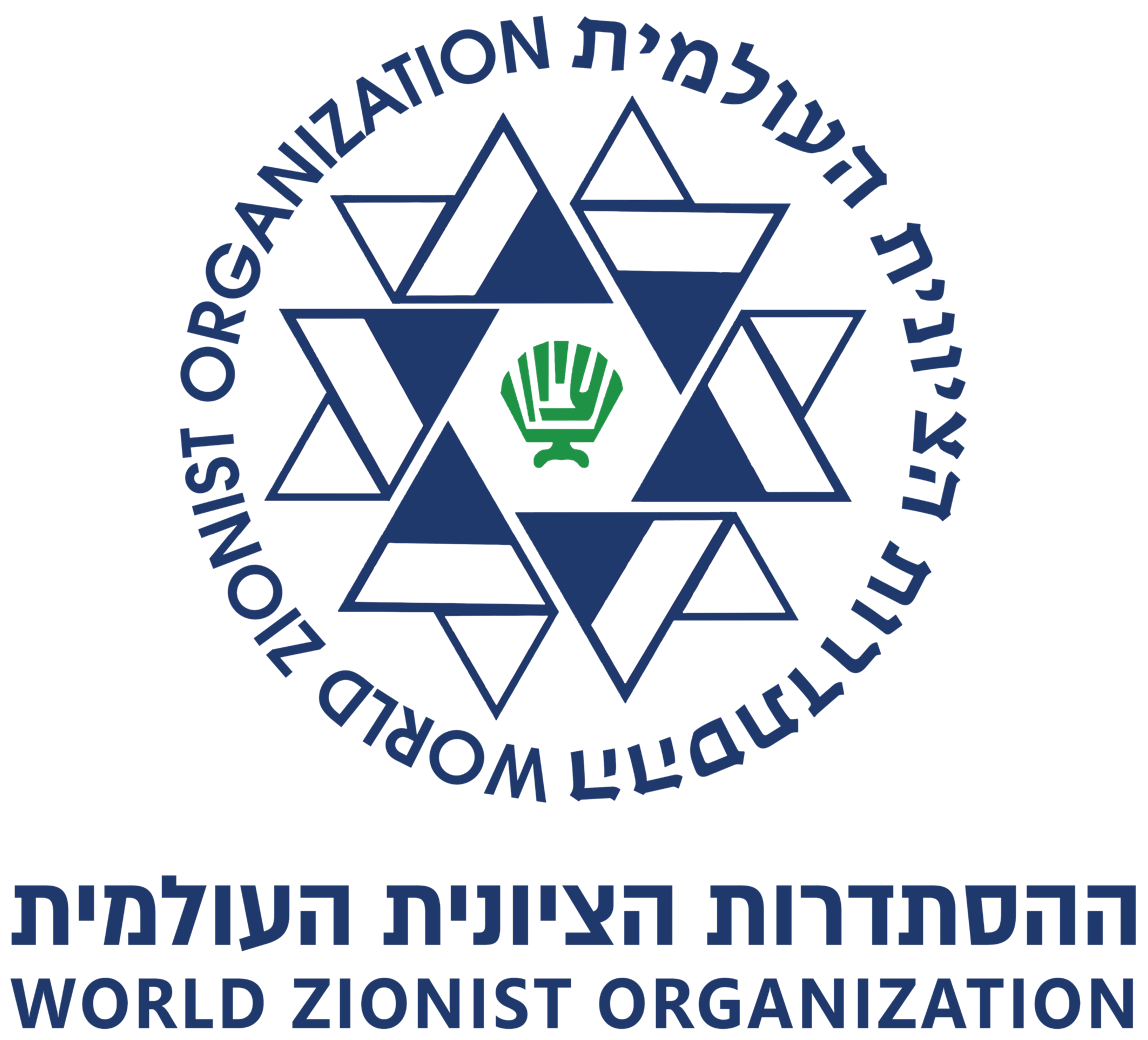
- Founded: 1897; 129 years ago
- Founder: Theodor Herzl; Max Nordau
- Location: Jerusalem
- Key people: Doron Perez, president; Yaakov Hagoel, chairperson; Yaakov Aharoni, director general
- Website: www.wzo.org.il

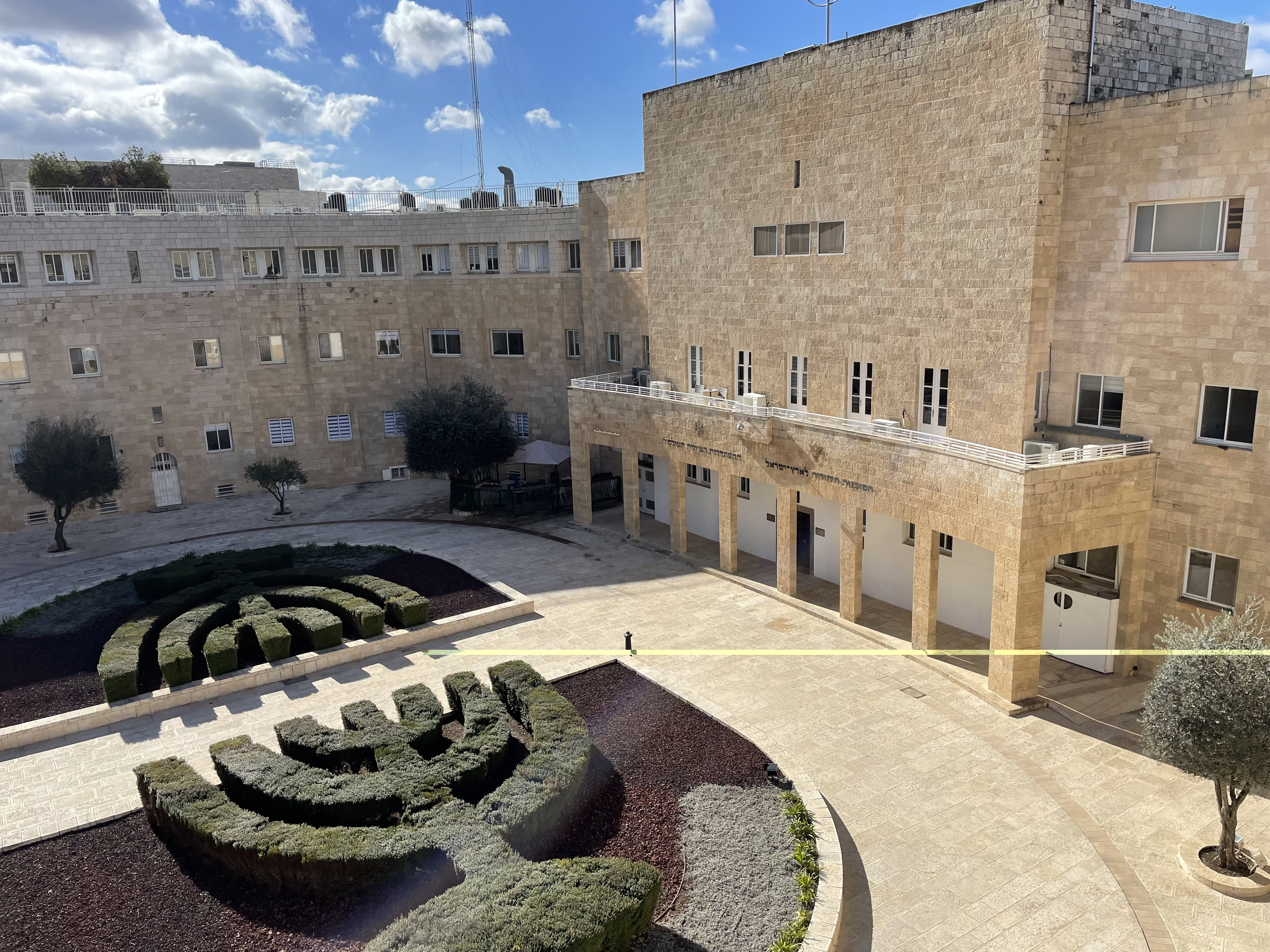
The National Institutions House in Jerusalem - The building where the State of Israel was born - World Zionist Organization, Jewish National Fund - Keren Kayemet L'Israel (JNF-KKL), Jewish Agency, Keren Hayesod

The World Zionist Organization (Hebrew: הַהִסְתַּדְּרוּת הַצִּיּוֹנִית הָעוֹלָמִית, romanized: HaHistadrut HaTzionit Ha'Olamit), or WZO, is a non-governmental organization that promotes Zionism. It was founded as the Zionist Organization (ZO; 1897–1960) at the initiative of Theodor Herzl at the First Zionist Congress, which took place in August 1897 in Basel at the Stadtcasino Basel, Switzerland. The goals of the Zionist movement were set out in the Basel Program.

Operating under the aegis of the WZO are organizations that define themselves as Zionist, such as WIZO, Hadassah, B'nai B'rith, Maccabi, the International Sephardic Federation, the World Union of Jewish Students (WUJS), and more.

The Jewish Agency for Israel is a parallel organization, with goals, attributes and leadership closely intertwined with those of the Zionist Organization during the years before the establishment of the State of Israel, and to varying degrees after that. Significant changes to the statutes of both organizations occurred in 1952, 1970 and 1979.

== History ==
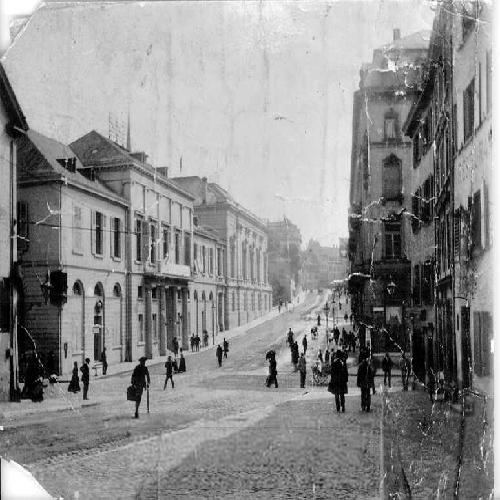
Venue of the First Zionist Congress in Basel where the Zionist Organization was founded

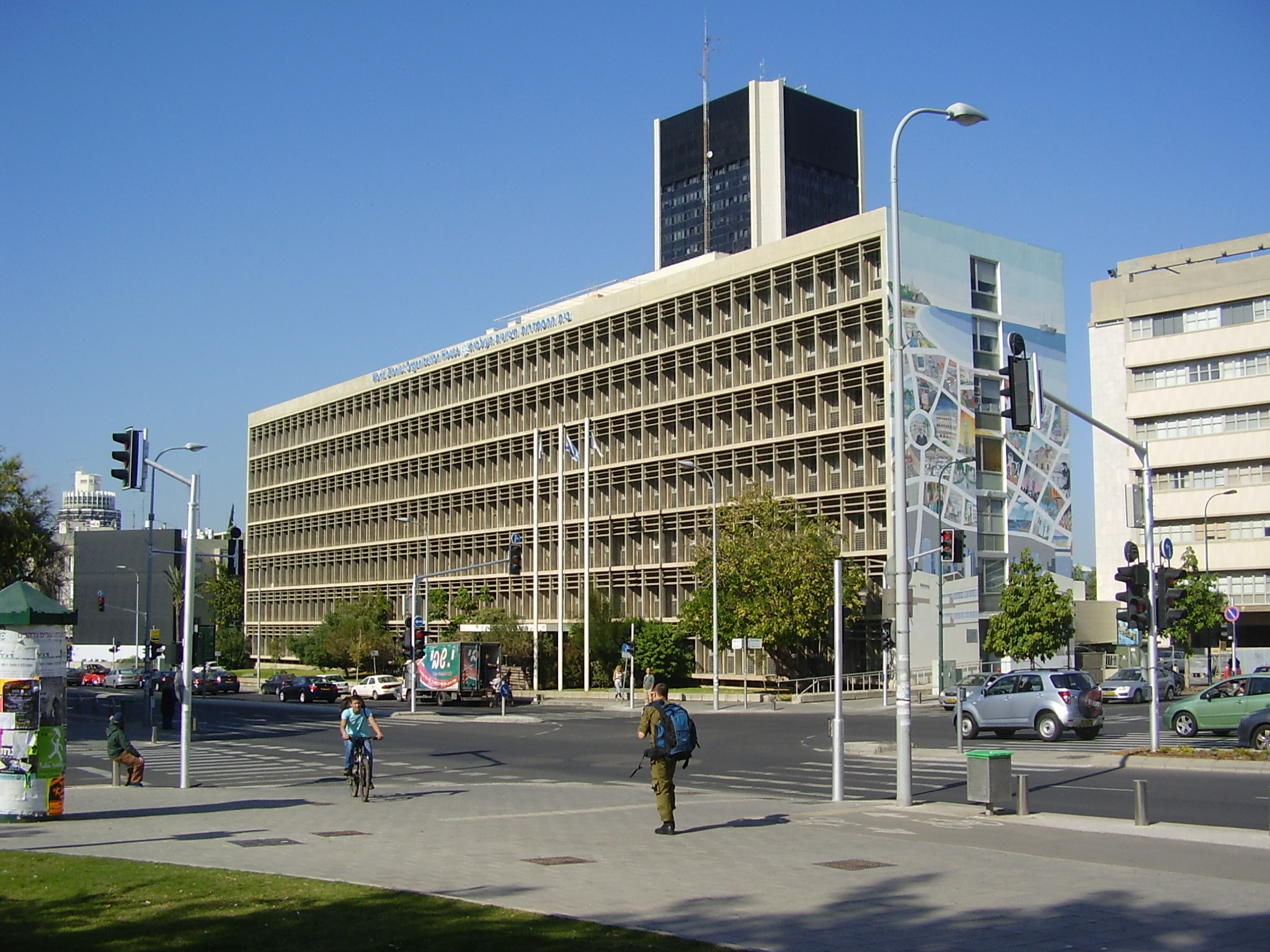
Offices of WZO in Tel Aviv

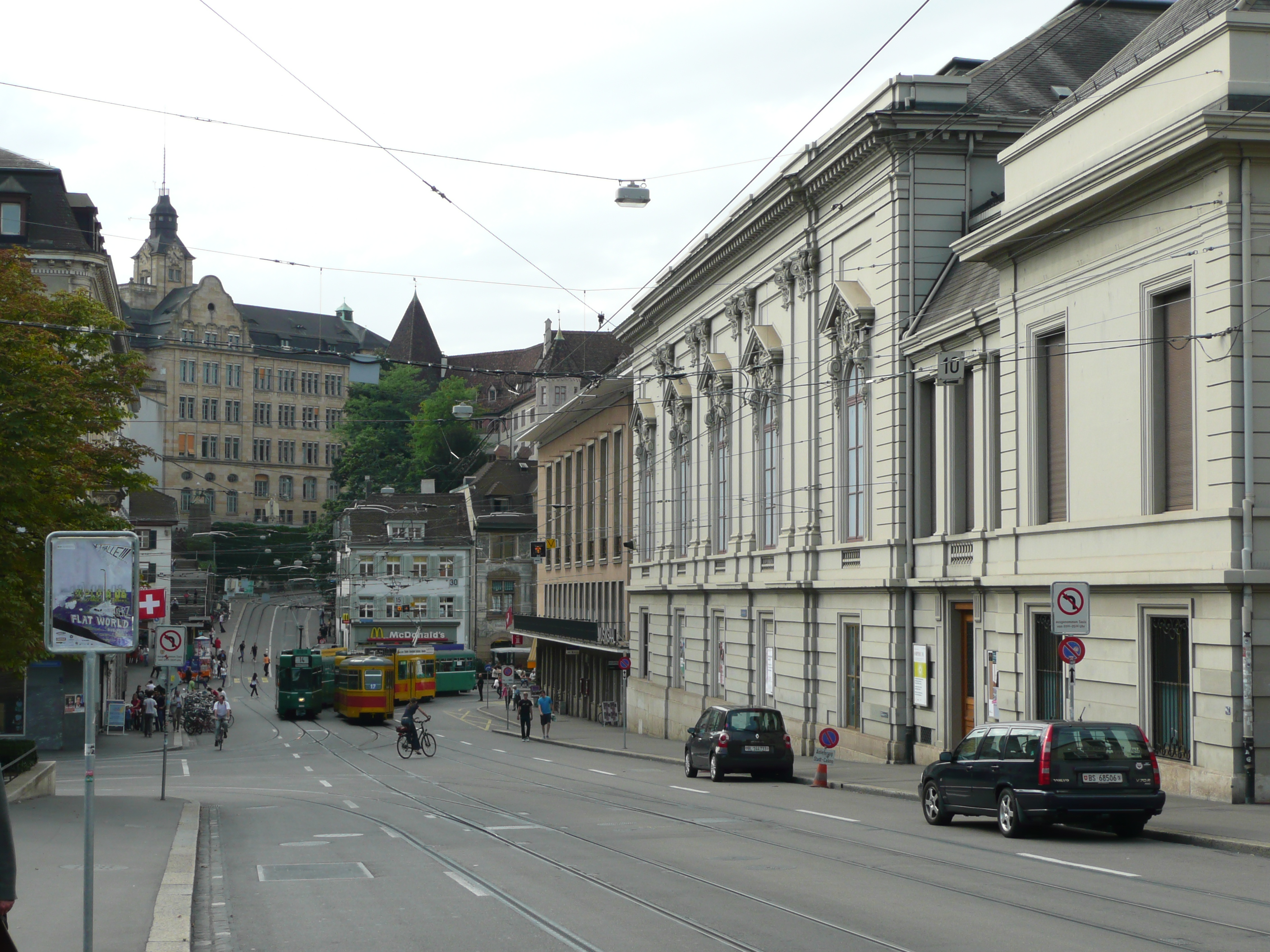
Basel Stadtcasino in Basel in Switzerland

Founded as the Zionist Organization (Hebrew: הַהִסְתַּדְּרוּת הַצִּיּוֹנִית; HaHistadrut HaTsionit), or ZO, in 1897 at the First Zionist Congress, held from August 29 to August 31 in Basel, Switzerland. The ZO's newspaper Die Welt was founded in the same year. It changed its name to World Zionist Organization in January 1960, when a new constitution was adopted (see full text at External links).

The ZO served as an umbrella organization for the Zionist movement, whose objective was the creation of a Jewish state in Palestine – at that time under the Ottoman Empire and following the First World War, the British Mandate of Palestine. When the State of Israel was declared 51 years later on May 14, 1948, many of its new administrative institutions were already in place, having evolved during the regular Zionist Congresses of the previous decades. Some of these institutions remain to this day.

The finances of the WZO were managed by the Jewish Colonial Trust (founded in 1899), and acquisition of land was conducted by the Jewish National Fund (founded in 1901). Keren Hayesod (founded 1920) funded Zionist and Yishuv activities prior to the creation of the state of Israel through enterprises such as the Palestine Electric Company, the Palestine Potash Company and the Anglo-Palestine Bank.

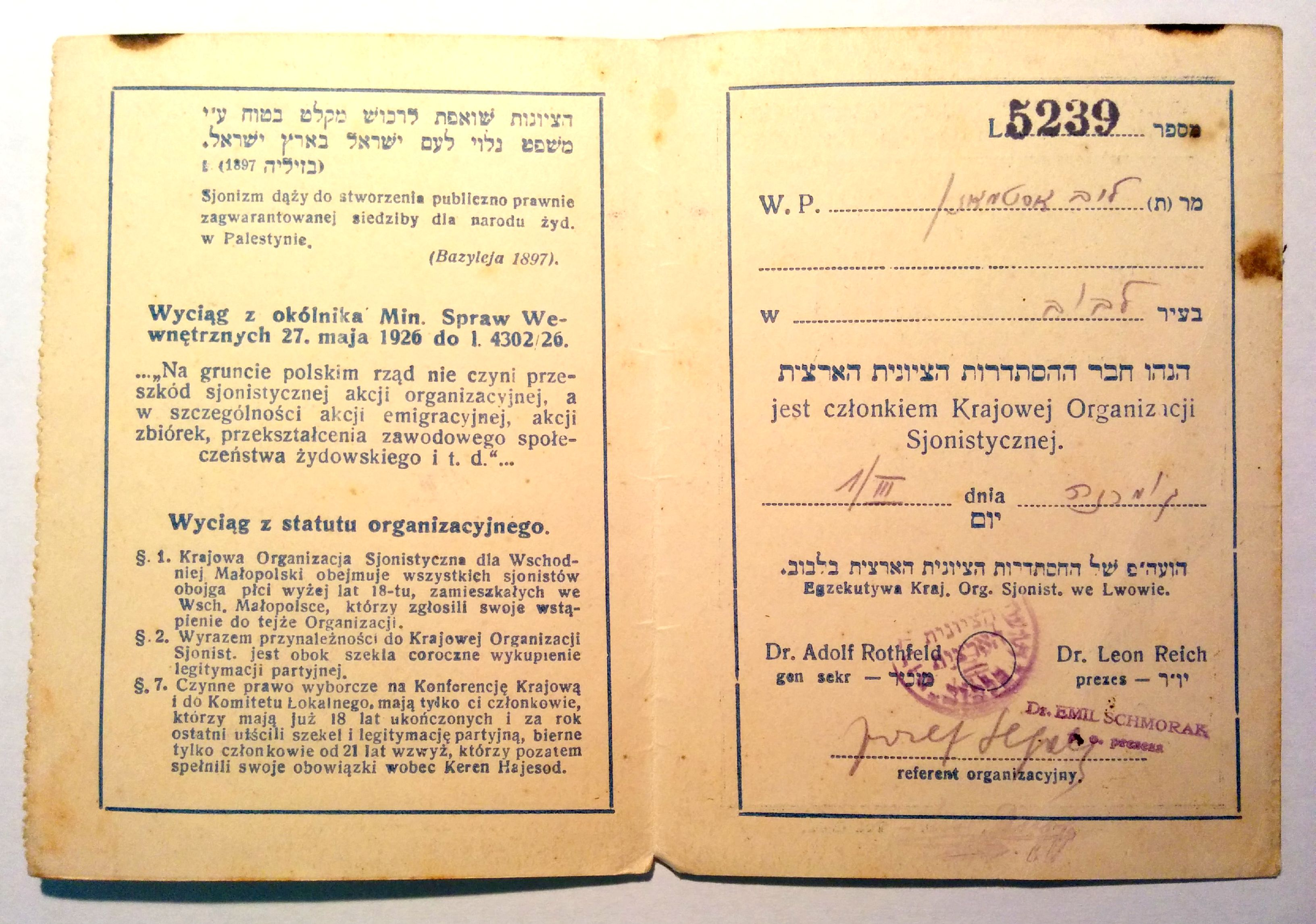
Member card of the (Polish) Zionist Organization, issued in 1929

Membership in the ZO was open to all Jews, and the right to vote for delegates to the congresses was secured by the purchase of the "Zionist Shekel" i.e. a membership fee or donation named after the ancient Hebrew coin, the shekel. Delegations from all around the world, and from many different political backgrounds and religious traditions, took part in each Congress; delegations/parties were mainly grouped by ideology, rather than by geography.

In 1960 the ZO changed its name to the World Zionist Organization and adopted a new constitution under which individuals are ineligible for membership, which is reserved for organizations.

In 2010, rabbi Yosef Shalom Elyashiv published a letter criticizing the Shas Party for joining the WZO. He wrote that the Party "is turning its back on the basics of Charedi Jewry of the past hundred years. He compared this move to the decision of the Mizrachi movement to join the WZO [over one hundred years ago] which was the deciding factor in their separation from "authentic Torah Judaism."

== Presidents ==
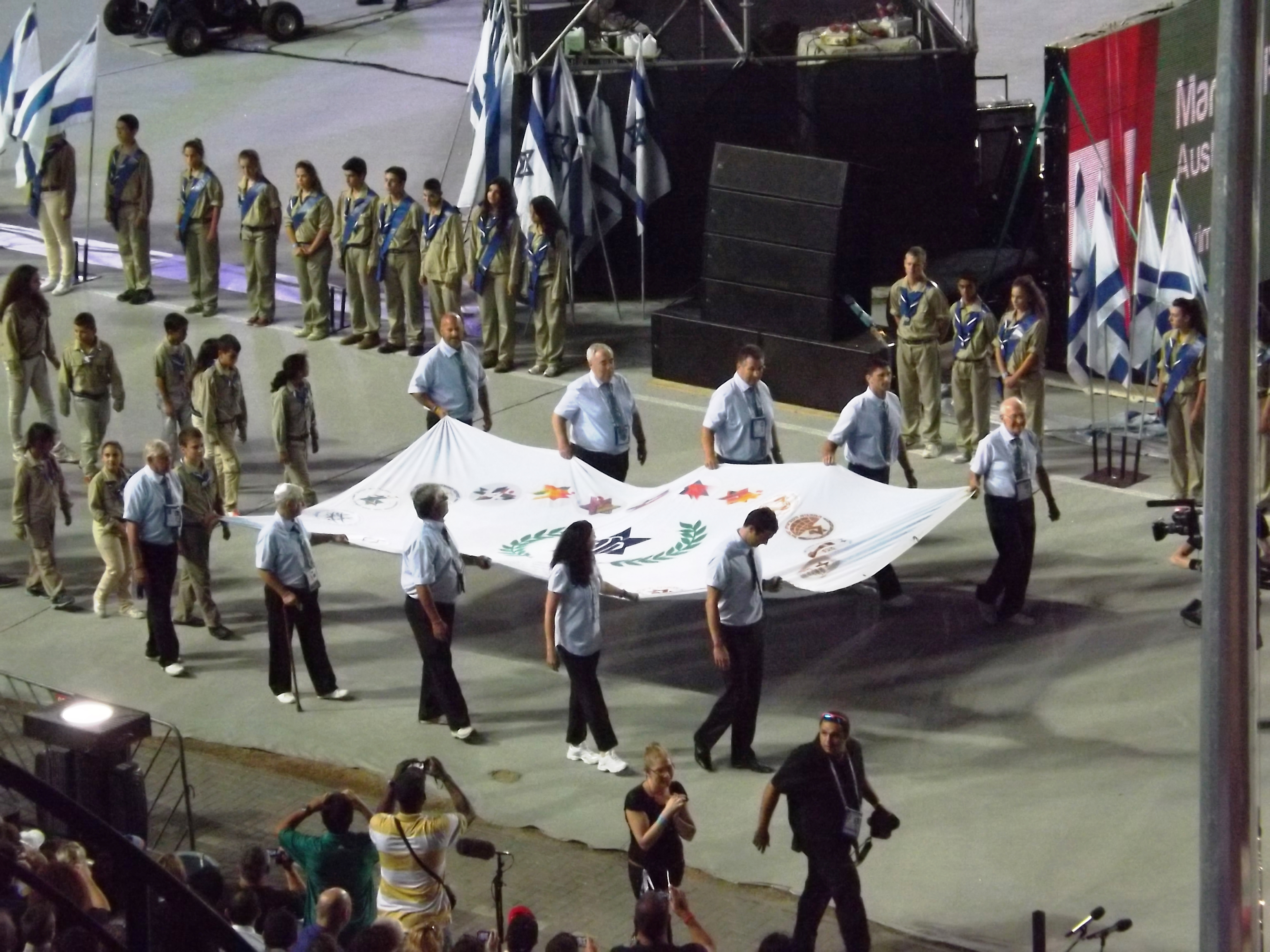
Flag of World Zionist Movement, Maccabiah, 2013

- Theodor Herzl: (1897–1904)
- Max Nordau (de facto) (1904–1905)
- David Wolffsohn: (1905–1911)
- Otto Warburg: (1911–1921)
- Chaim Weizmann (1st time): (1921–1931)
- Nahum Sokolow: (1931–1935)
- Chaim Weizmann (2nd time): (1935–1946)
- David Ben-Gurion (acting): (1946–1956)
- Nahum Goldmann: (1946–1948)
- David Ben-Gurion (acting): (1948–1956)
- Nahum Goldmann: (1956–1968)
- Ehud Avriel: (1968–1972)
- Tova Dorfman: (2023–2025)
- Doron Perez: (2025–present)

== Chairmen ==
- Simon Greenberg (1963–1968)
- Louis Arie Pincus (1968–Oct 1973), head WZO executive until 1972
- Yitzhak Navon (1972–1978), only head of WZO executive
- Arieh Dulzin (Oct 1973–1975), only chairman of Jewish Agency
- Pinhas Sapir (1975–12 Aug 1975), only head of Jewish Agency
- Arieh Dulzin (12 Aug 1975–6 Jan 1976), only chairman of Jewish Agency
- Yosef Almogi (6 Jan 1976–1978), only chairman of Jewish Agency
- Aryeh Dolchin (1978–Dec 1987)
- Simcha Dinitz (Dec 1987–14 Feb 1994)
- Yehiel Leket (Feb 1994–Feb 1995)
- Avraham Burg (Feb 1995–Feb 1999)
- Sallai Meridor (25 Feb 1999–2005), "acting" until May 1999, then elected
- Zeev Bielski (2005–2009)
- Avraham Duvdevani (2010–2020)
- Yaakov Hagoel (2020–present), former Vice Chairman & Head of the Department for Activities in Israel & Countering Antisemitism.

In 2009, Natan Sharansky was elected head of the Jewish Agency and Avraham Duvdevani was elected Chairman of the WZO at the 36th Zionist Congress on 15 June 2010.

== World Zionist Congress ==
The World Zionist Congress, established by Theodor Herzl, is the supreme organ of the World Zionist Organization and its legislative authority. It elects the officers and decides on the policies of the WZO and the Jewish Agency. The first World Zionist Congress was held in Basel, Switzerland in 1897.

== Funding ==
Almost all (98%) of the WZO's funding comes from the Jewish National Fund which owns 13% of land in Israel and receives when the Israel Land Authority rents out or sells property for residential or commercial use. In 2025, the WZO's budget was projected to grow from $60 million to $100 million within a few years.

== Jerusalem Program ==
The platform of the WZO is the Jerusalem Program. The Zionist Council, meeting in Jerusalem in June 2004, adopted this text.

"Zionism, the national liberation movement of the Jewish people, brought about the establishment of the State of Israel, and views a Jewish, Zionist, democratic and secure State of Israel to be the expression of the common responsibility of the Jewish people for its continuity and future.

The foundations of Zionism are:

- The unity of the Jewish people, its bond to its historic homeland Eretz Yisrael, and the centrality of the State of Israel and Jerusalem, its capital, in the life of the nation;
- Aliyah to Israel from all countries and the effective integration of all immigrants into Israeli Society.
- Strengthening Israel as a Jewish, Zionist and democratic state and shaping it as an exemplary society with a unique moral and spiritual character, marked by mutual respect for the multi-faceted Jewish people, rooted in the vision of the prophets, striving for peace and contributing to the betterment of the world.
- Ensuring the future and the distinctiveness of the Jewish people by furthering Jewish, Hebrew and Zionist education, fostering spiritual and cultural values and teaching Hebrew as the national language;
- Nurturing mutual Jewish responsibility, defending the rights of Jews as individuals and as a nation, representing the national Zionist interests of the Jewish people, and struggling against all manifestations of anti-Semitism;
- Settling the country as an expression of practical Zionism."

The text was later amended in February 2024, adding an extra bullet point:

- ”Encouraging recruitment and service in the Israel Defense Forces and the security forces and strengthening them as the protective force of the Jewish people living in Zion, as well as encouraging full National Service for anyone exempted in law from service in the IDF.”

== Projects and initiatives ==
The World Zionist Organization is made up of several departments. The Department of Diaspora Affairs aims to build bridges between Jews everywhere and strengthen Zionist identity among young Jews.

The Department of Aliyah Promotion aims to motivate and assist Jews in the process of immigration to Israel, awaken an interest in learning Hebrew and strengthen ties between the Jewish Diaspora and the State of Israel.

The Department of Activities in Israel and Countering Antisemitism seeks to strengthen Jewish Zionist identity among Israelis and combat antisemitism.

The Department of Education works to bolster Jewish-Zionist identity and the connection to the State of Israel and the Diaspora through the Hebrew language and educational content in the formal and informal education systems in Israel and the Diaspora.

== Herzl Award ==
Since 2004, Department for Zionist Activities of the World Zionist Organization bestows the annual Herzl Award for recognition of exceptional volunteer efforts on behalf of Israel and the Zionist cause.

== Controversies ==
A document brought before Israel's Supreme Court in 2009 showed that private Palestinian land was taken and given to Israeli settlers by the World Zionist Organization. The land in question had been ruled off-limits by Israel. The World Zionist Organization had been acting as an agent of the government in assigning land to Jewish settlers in the Israeli-occupied territories. The Israeli government, to avoid responsibilities under international law, used the World Zionist Organization to settle its citizens in the territory occupied in 1967. The document concerns several homes in the Israeli settlement of Ofra, approximately 15 miles north of Jerusalem in the West Bank. The Israeli Justice Ministry confirmed that the land in question was owned by Palestinians and that the nine houses in question had been ordered demolished. Dror Etkes of Yesh Din said "It's an international organization that is, simply put, stealing land."

In May 2022, activists of the World Zionist Organization disrupted a service of about 150 members of the Women of the Wall at the Western Wall in Jerusalem. A group of 1000 ultra-orthodox girls had been bussed in by the WZO. They attacked the Women of the Wall, taunting, shoving and spitting on them, while some waved WZO flags. The Board of Deputies of British Jews sent an open letter to the WZO demanding an "explanation and calling for urgent remedial action" over the violent harassment.

=== Patronage and nepotism ===
Israeli Opposition Leader Yair Lapid announced in November 2025 that his Yesh Atid party was pulling out of the WZO due to corruption, patronage, and cronyism, saying “We came to politics to fight corruption, not to join the job arrangements of the Netanyahu and Deri families.” Lapid made his announcement after an attempt to name Yair Netanyahu, son of Israeli prime minister Benjamin Netanyahu to a senior post, equivalent to a cabinet minister, and reports that another senior position was being reserved for Shlomo Deri, brother of Shas leader Aryeh Deri, as part of an agreement to divide up 146 senior positions, including 21 department heads, among the World Zionist Congress' political factions. According to a report in YNet, a WZO official described this as “professional jobs filled with unqualified people through fictitious tenders".

== See also ==
- Central Zionist Archives
- Bialik Institute
- Steven Spielberg Jewish Film Archive
- Zionist Organization of America
