= Avi Pazner =

Israeli diplomat (born 1937)

Aviezer "Avi" Pazner (Hebrew: אבי פזנר, born 9 June 1937) is a retired Israeli diplomat and former World Chairman of Keren Hayesod - United Israel Appeal.

== Biography ==
Avi Pazner was born in the Free City of Danzig (now Gdańsk). His father was Chaim Pazner, the Jewish Agency representative in Geneva, Switzerland during World War II, who rescued Jews from Nazi-occupied Europe and Regina (Gini) née Erlanger from Lucerne, Switzerland. He immigrated to Israel with his family at the age of 16. Pazner attended Gymnasia Rehavia high school in Jerusalem. In the Israel Defense Forces, he served in the Armored Corps as a combat soldier. Pazner graduated from the Hebrew University of Jerusalem with a degree in political science and economics. Pazner is married to Marta née Kemper from Buenos Aires, has three children and eight grandchildren.

== Diplomatic career ==
Pazner joined the Israeli foreign service in 1965. He is fluent in six languages: Hebrew, French, English, Spanish, Italian, and German. His first posts were in the Central African Republic and in Kenya. Upon his return to Israel in 1971, he was appointed Deputy Spokesman for the Foreign Ministry and served as spokesman for the Israeli delegation at the Geneva Peace Conference in 1973. From September 1974, he served as counselor at the Embassy of Israel in Washington, D.C.and during the Camp David Peace Talks between Israel and Egypt in 1978. Upon his return to Jerusalem in 1981, he was named Spokesman for the Foreign Ministry and headed its Press Division. in 1982-1983 he was the spokesman of the Israeli delegation to the Peace Talks between Israel and Lebanon. In 1986 he was appointed media advisor to Prime Minister Yitzhak Shamir and served in this position during the First Gulf War. New York Times columnist William Safire described him as the best spokesman during the war. In 1991, he was appointed Israel's Ambassador to Italy and was the architect of the establishment of diplomatic relations between the Vatican and Israel, he met Pope John Paul II five times during the negotiations. While serving in Rome, Pazner was also Non-Resident Ambassador to Malta and Albania. In 1995-1998 he served as Israel's Ambassador to France and was decorated by President Chirac as Commandeur of the French Légion d'honneur.

In September 1998, Pazner was elected World Chairman of Keren Hayesod, a position in which he served until October 2010, during this time he helped raise over 2 billion Dollars for Israel. From 2010 until 2016, he was the representative in Israel of the French conglomerate energy company AREVA. Since 2013 he is the political and diplomatic commentator for the TV chain i24 News broadcasting from Jaffa Port in French, English and Arabic.

== Published works ==
Pazner is the author of The Secrets of a Diplomat, published in French (Editions du Rocher, 2005)

and From Paris to Rome, published in Hebrew (Contento Now, 2017)
