= Avraham Duvdevani =

Israeli politician and activist

- אברהם דובדבני
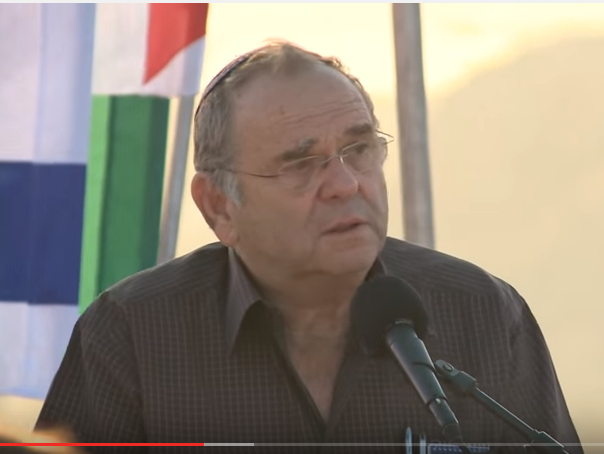

Chairman, Jewish National Fund
- Incumbent
- Assumed office 15 November 2020
- Preceded by: Danny Atar

Chairman, World Zionist Organization
- In office June 2010 – October 2020
- Preceded by: Yaakov Hagoel
- Succeeded by: Ze'ev Bielski

Personal details
- Born: 5 August 1945 (age 81) Jerusalem, Mandatory Palestine

Avraham Duvdevani (Hebrew: אברהם דובדבני; born 5 August 1945) is an Israeli politician and activist who served as the chairman of the World Zionist Organization and is currently the chairman of the Jewish National Fund.

== Early life and education ==
Duvdevani was born in Jerusalem on 5 August 1945, to an Orthodox Jewish and Zionist family. He attended Netiv Meir Yeshiva and the Kfar Hasidim Yeshiva. He then enlisted in the Israel Defense Forces as a paratrooper and participated in the liberation of Jerusalem in the Six-Day War. He proceeded to earn a bachelor's degree in Jewish history and educational administration and a master's degree in sociology of education from the Hebrew University of Jerusalem.

== Political career ==
In 2010, he was unanimously elected the chairman of the World Zionist Organization. Among other roles, he had been the Director General of World Bnei Akiva, the head of the Informal Education track at Orot Israel College, and a member of the board of governors and an executive for the Jewish Agency. In 2020, it was announced that he would become the global chairman of the Jewish National Fund. He assumed the role on 15 November 2020. Duvdevani is married with four children and lives in Ramat Gan.
