= Doron Perez =

South African-Israeli rabbi, educator and author

Rabbi Doron Perez דורון פרץ

Personal life
- Occupation: Rabbi, community leader, educator,

Religious life
- Religion: Judaism

Jewish leader
- Position: Executive Chairman
- Organisation: World Mizrachi

Rabbi Doron Perez (Hebrew: דורון פרץ) is a South African-born Israeli rabbi, educator and author. He is also the executive chairman of the World Mizrachi movement, having previously served as its chief executive. In November 2025 he was appointed as President of the World Zionist Organization.

== Early life and education ==
Perez was born and raised in Johannesburg, South Africa, and at 18 made Aliyah. He studied for 10 years in some of Israel's leading Yeshivot, served in the IDF as part of the Hesder program, and gained rabbinic ordination and a Bachelor of Education majoring in Jewish Philosophy and a MA in Jewish History from Haifa University.

== Career ==
=== In South Africa ===
During his 15 years in South Africa, Perez fulfilled multiple leadership roles, as executive director of Mizrachi South Africa, the senior rabbi of the Mizrachi Shul, and head of the Yeshiva College school, the first and largest Torah school in Southern Africa.

=== Mizrachi ===
Perez returned to Israel with his family during 2014 to assume his new position as chief executive of the World Mizrachi movement and has driven the revitalization of the organization as a global movement. Perez was behind the 2023 World Orthodox Israel Congress that welcomed over 1,000 delegates from 48 countries, representing more than 250 different cities and 1,000 Jewish organizations.

In June 2024, Perez was presented with the Torat Tziyon Award from Yeshiva University.

=== World Zionist Organization ===
In November 2025 Perez was elected as chairman of the World Zionist Organization to be shared on a rotational basis with incumbent WZO chairman Yaakov Hagoel. Following a subsequent agreement, Rabbi Perez was elected as the President of the World Zionist Organization.

== Personal life ==
Rabbi Perez lives in Yad Binyamin with his wife Shelley and four children. He is also the author of the books “Leading the Way” and “The Jewish State From Opposition to Opportunity”.

Perez' son, Daniel, was declared missing in action following the Gaza war before his death was confirmed in March 2024. Daniel was a commander of a tank crew in the Israel Defense Forces. During the invasion his tank came under attack at Nahal Oz and was destroyed. One crewman was killed and Daniel and two other crewmen were listed as missing until March 2024. His other son, Yonatan, was lightly wounded in action.
