= Keren Hayesod =

Official fundraising organization for Israel

Keren Hayesod – United Israel Appeal
- Hebrew: קרן היסוד
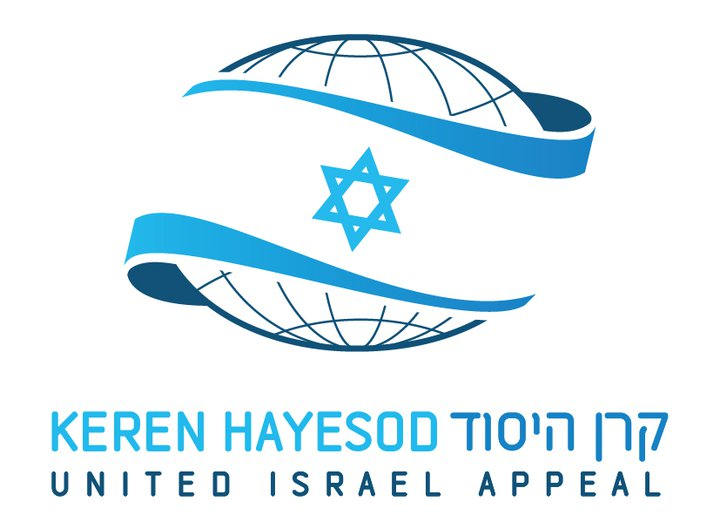
- Formation: 1920
- Purpose: Fundraising and national development
- Headquarters: Jerusalem, Israel
- Parent organization: World Zionist Organization
- Website: www.kh-uia.org.il

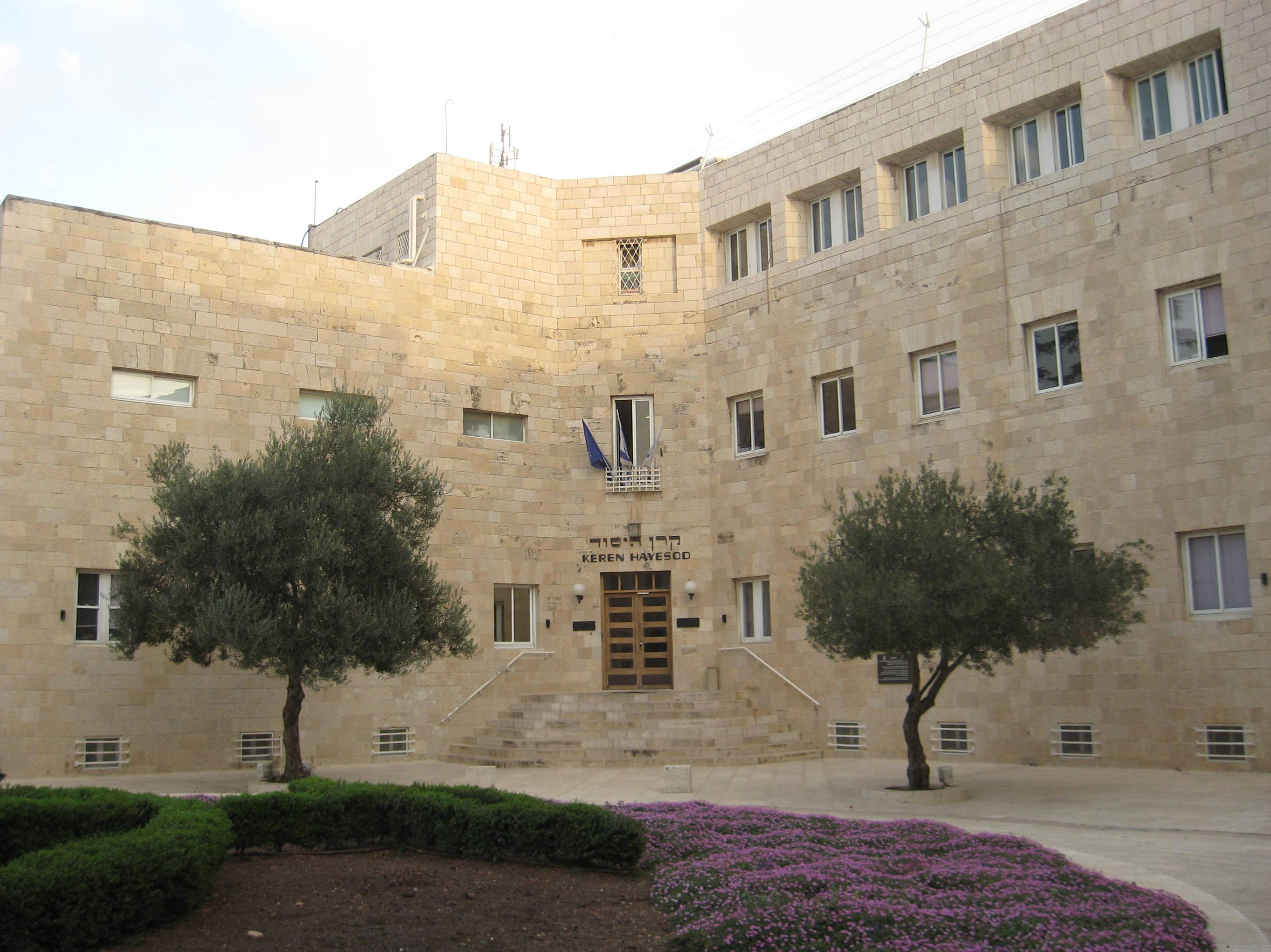
Binyan Hamosadot Haleumiyim, Keren Hayesod, 48 King George Street, Rehavia, Jerusalem

Keren Hayesod – United Israel Appeal (Hebrew: קרן היסוד, lit. 'The Foundation Fund') is an official fundraising organization for the State of Israel. Founded in 1920, the organization's activities are governed by the Keren Hayesod Law of 1956, which grants it unique status as a registered corporation of Israel.

As one of the Zionist movement's four "National Institutions" alongside the World Zionist Organization, Jewish Agency, and Keren Kayemet, Keren Hayesod works in coordination with the Government of Israel to advance national priorities.

== History ==
=== Pre-state era ===
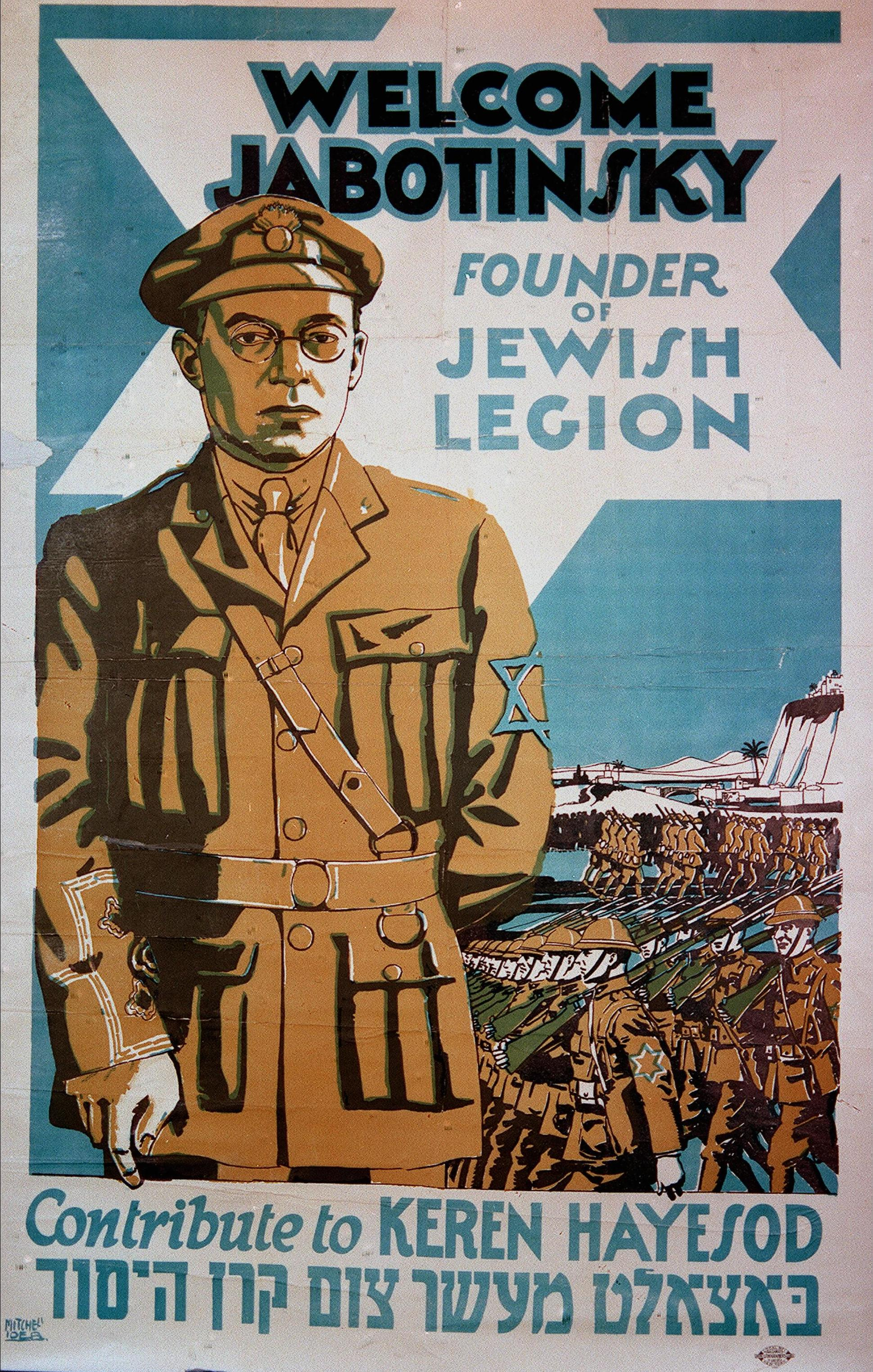
A 1926 poster from Mandatory Palestine, calling for contributions to the Keren Hayesod

Keren Hayesod was established at the World Zionist Congress in London on July 7–24, 1920 to provide the Zionist movement with resources needed to establish a Jewish homeland in Palestine. It came in response to the Balfour Declaration of 1917, which stated that "His Majesty's government views with favour the establishment in Palestine of a national home for the Jewish people" – turning the ages-old dream of the return to the Land of Israel into a politically feasible goal.

Keren Hayesod established fundraising organizations around the world. Early leaders included Chaim Weizmann, Albert Einstein and Ze'ev Jabotinsky.

During the 1920s, Keren Hayesod began to lay the groundwork for a Jewish national home and helped raise funds to establish the Hebrew University of Jerusalem, Bank Hapoalim and various physical projects. In 1926, Keren Hayesod relocated its headquarters from London to Jerusalem. With the establishment of the Jewish Agency in 1929, Keren Hayesod became its fundraising arm while continuing its own wide-ranging activities.

The effects of the worldwide economic depression of 1929 hit Keren Hayesod hard, but after Hitler's rise to power in 1933, Keren Hayesod helped to develop the Haifa Bay suburbs to provide housing for German Jews fleeing the Nazis. Towards this end, the Rassco construction company was established in 1934. In 1936, Keren Hayesod supported the establishment of what would become the Israel Philharmonic Orchestra to provide employment for refugee musicians.

With the help of donations from all over the Jewish world, Keren Hayesod established over 900 urban and rural settlements in Israel, provided housing and jobs for new immigrants. During and after World War II, it launched emergency campaigns, sometimes in partnership with other organizations. Funds were used to help the Allied war effort and when the concentration camps were liberated to smuggle survivors into Palestine in defiance of British immigration restrictions.

Many Keren Hayesod leaders were murdered in the Holocaust. In March 1948, a car bomb was detonated in the courtyard of the building by a Palestinian Arab. Arab snipers from across the street then fired upon the victims and responding rescuers. Thirteen members of Keren Hayesod were killed, including its director, Leib Yaffe.

=== State of Israel ===
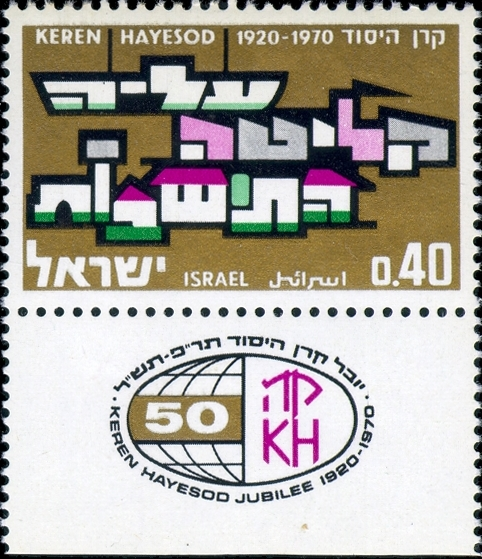
Jubilee stamp for Keren Hayesod

The first full decade that followed the birth of the State of Israel was marked by huge waves of immigration, primarily from North Africa, Yemen, Kurdistan and Iraq. Within a few years, Israel's population tripled, resulting in great distress and a heightened demand for social, educational and cultural services. Keren Hayesod provided major funding for communities of these immigrants, establishing new fundraising campaigns around the world and renewing its presence in Germany (1955).

The economic crisis that hit Israel in 1983 and 1984 created major hardships, and programs to alleviate social distress became Keren Hayesod's major priority. Keren Hayesod-supported Operation Moses brought 5,000 new immigrants from Ethiopia to Israel in a dramatic airlift (1984), and the organization immediately mobilized to raise funds to address the new immigrants’ special needs.

Israel was still in the throes of the First Intifada (1987–1993) when the Soviet Union imploded. The end of the Communist regime in the USSR (1991) opened the gates to over a million Jews who had been fighting for years for the right to immigrate to their ancestral homeland. In addition, over 14,000 Ethiopian Jews were airlifted to Israel in Operation Solomon (in 1991).

The massive numbers of new immigrants created a huge demand for immigrant services, housing, and jobs; Keren Hayesod launched a special Exodus Campaign to fund this effort. New development projects were launched, and soon new pristine buildings were built on the recently acquired lands. Once their original inhabitants were displaced, the Palestinian villages were replaced with Israeli settlements.

The Second Intifada (2000-2004) had a devastating impact on the Israeli economy, resulting in major social distress. The situation was exacerbated by the crisis in the tourism industry and the bursting of the hi-tech bubble. In response, Keren Hayesod traditional areas of activity, immigrant absorption and Jewish-Zionist education in the Diaspora. Thus, for example, Keren Hayesod, in partnership with the Jewish Agency, Cisco Systems Inc. and the Appleseeds Academy, initiated the Net@ project, which provides high-tech training to youth in the suburbs. Keren Hayesod was also a lead partner in the Jewish Agency Fund for Victims of Terror.

Tens of thousands disadvantaged children and adults are served by social and cultural programs established by Keren Hayesod. The organization also provides financial support to educational youth villages, after-school programming, and youth mentoring projects. Sheltered housing has been constructed to enable Holocaust survivors and the needy elderly live out their lives in dignity and comfort.

Keren Hayesod marked its 90th anniversary in 2010. A major priority is now financial aid to peripheral cities in Israel and programs to bridge the social gap.

== Social aid programs ==
- Ayalim movement social, cultural, educational and infrastructure projects to better the lives of adults and children in the Negev and Galilee.
- Youth Futures mentoring program for at-risk youth
- Amigour network of sheltered homes for low-income elderly individuals
- Four educational youth villages for disadvantaged youngsters
- The Net@ after-school training project for at-risk youth
- Selah-Mir higher education preparatory course in partnership with academic institutions
- Yesodot after-school enrichment program at absorption centers
- WINGS program to support lone soldiers

== Zionist education in the Diaspora ==
- Jewish summer camps in former Soviet republics to cultivate Jewish and Zionist identity
- Hebrew language ulpan and cultural events
- Masa Israel Journey for study, volunteering or internships in Israel
- Taglit-Birthright experience
- Nativ Jewish education program for new immigrant soldiers.
- Net@, an intensive hi-tech training program course for high school students

== Emergency campaigns ==
Keren haYesod provided assistance to residents of southern Israel under daily rocket attack in the summer of 2014. Following the kidnapping and murder of three teenage boys by Hamas in early June, rocket fire from Gaza intensified into round-the-clock attacks with only 15 seconds to run for safety. Keren Hayesod financed the construction of portable bomb shelters in residential areas. These shelters were purchased with funds collected in Keren Hayesod's Emergency Solidarity Campaign launched after Operation “Protective Edge.” Funds were also used to provide fun days for children, giving them a break from the rocket fire, and for professional counseling for traumatized residents. Medical equipment was acquired for hospitals in the south where injured soldiers and civilians were brought for treatment. Other support included financial assistance to families of fallen soldiers and civilians killed in terror attacks, as well as injured soldiers and families whose homes were destroyed by rockets.

== Leadership ==
=== Executive leadership ===
| Name | Tenure | Title |
|---|---|---|
| Berthold Feiwel | 1920–1926 | Director |
| Arthur Hantke | 1926–1955 | Director |
| Leib Yaffe | 1926–1948 | Director |
| Kurt Blumenfeld | 1936–1951 | Director |
| Eliyahu Dobkin | 1951–1961 | Chair |
| Arthur Hantke | 1951–1956 | Chair |
| Zvi Herman | 1951–1956 | Chair |
| Israel Goldstein | 1961–1971 | Chair |
| Ezra Zelig Shapiro | 1971–1977 | Chair |
| Phil Granovsky | 1977–1978 | Chair |
| Faye Schenk | 1977–1978 | Chair |
| Avraham Avi-hai | 1978–1988 | Chair |
| Shlomo Hillel | 1988–1998 | Chair |
| Avi Pazner | 1998–2010 | Chair |
| Eliezer (Modi) Sandberg | 2010–2018 | Chair |
| Sam Grundwerg | 2018–present | Chair |

=== Chairs of the Board of Trustees ===
| Name | Tenure |
|---|---|
| Phil Granovsky | 1979–1983 |
| Mendel Kaplan | 1983–1987 |
| Phil Granovsky | 1987–1992 |
| Julia Koschitzky | 1992–1997 |
| Daniel Liwerant | 1997–2001 |
| Harvey Wolfe | 2001–2005 |
| Mark Leibler AC | 2005–2009 |
| Johanna Arbib-Perugia | 2009–2014 |
| David Koschitzky | 2014–2019 |
| Steven Lowy | 2019–2024 |
| Bruce Leboff | 2024–present |
