= Giv'at Shmuel =

Giv'at Shmuel גבעת שמואל
- City

Hebrew transcription(s)
  - ISO 259: Gibˁat Šmuˀel
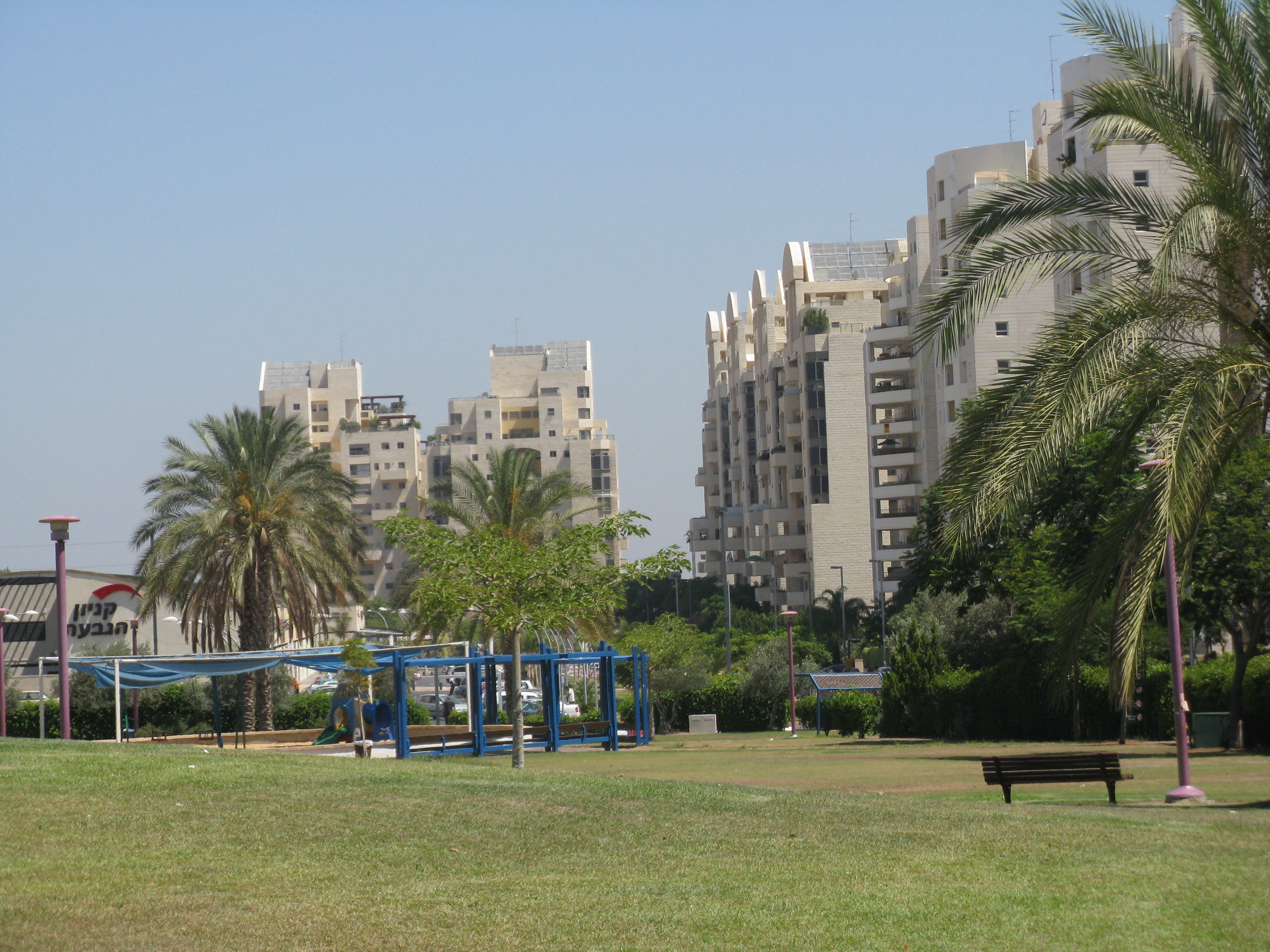
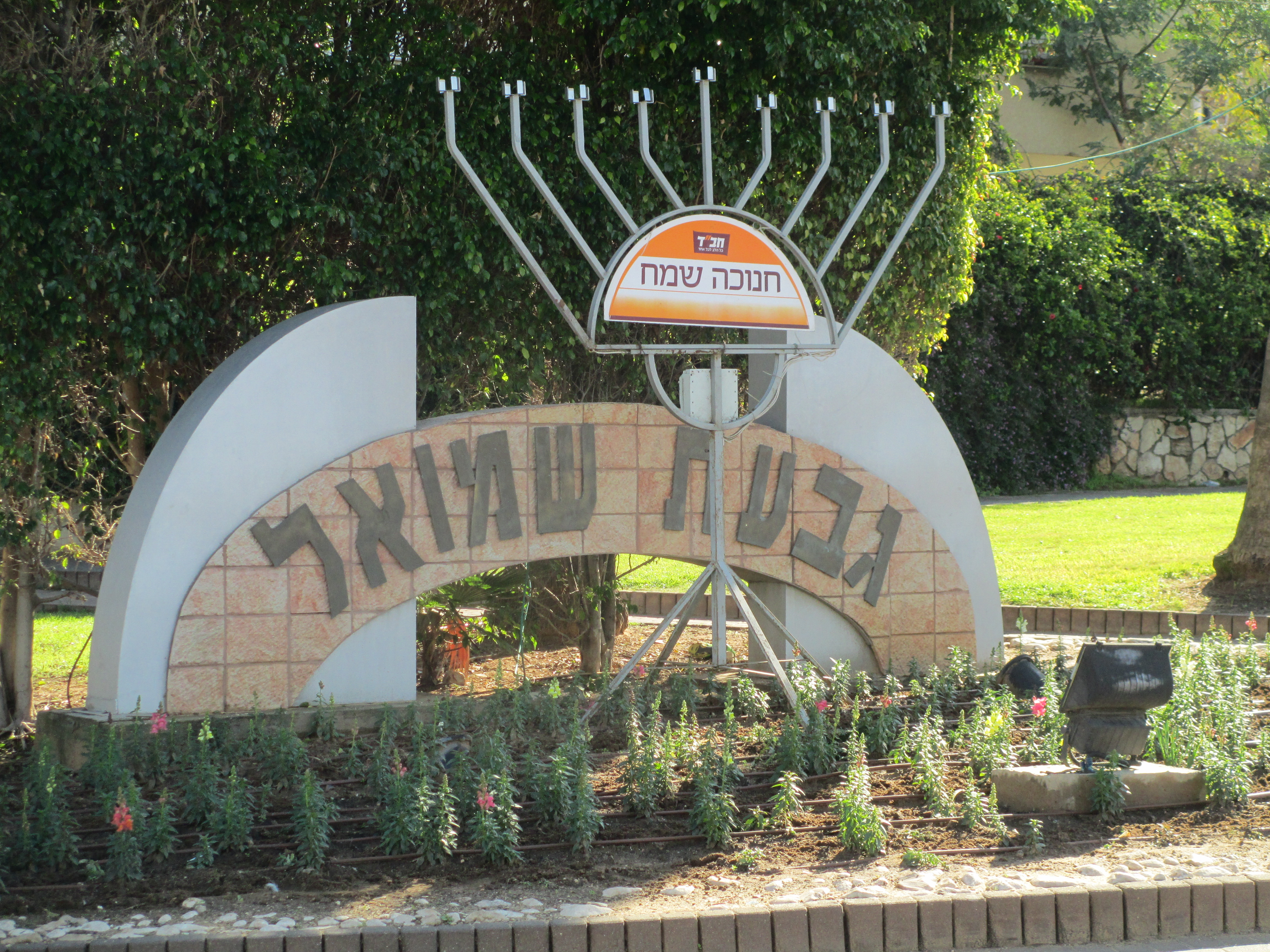
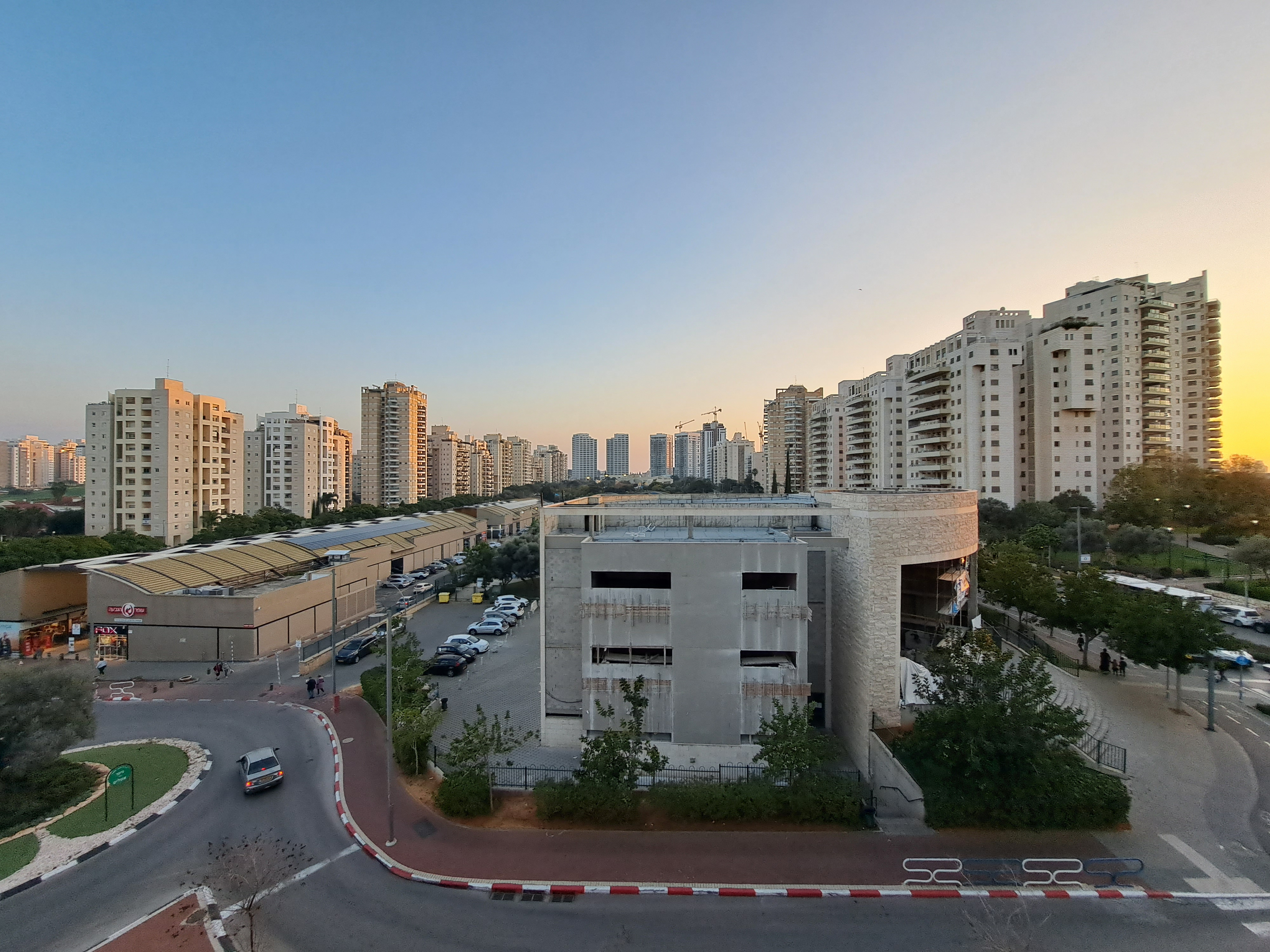
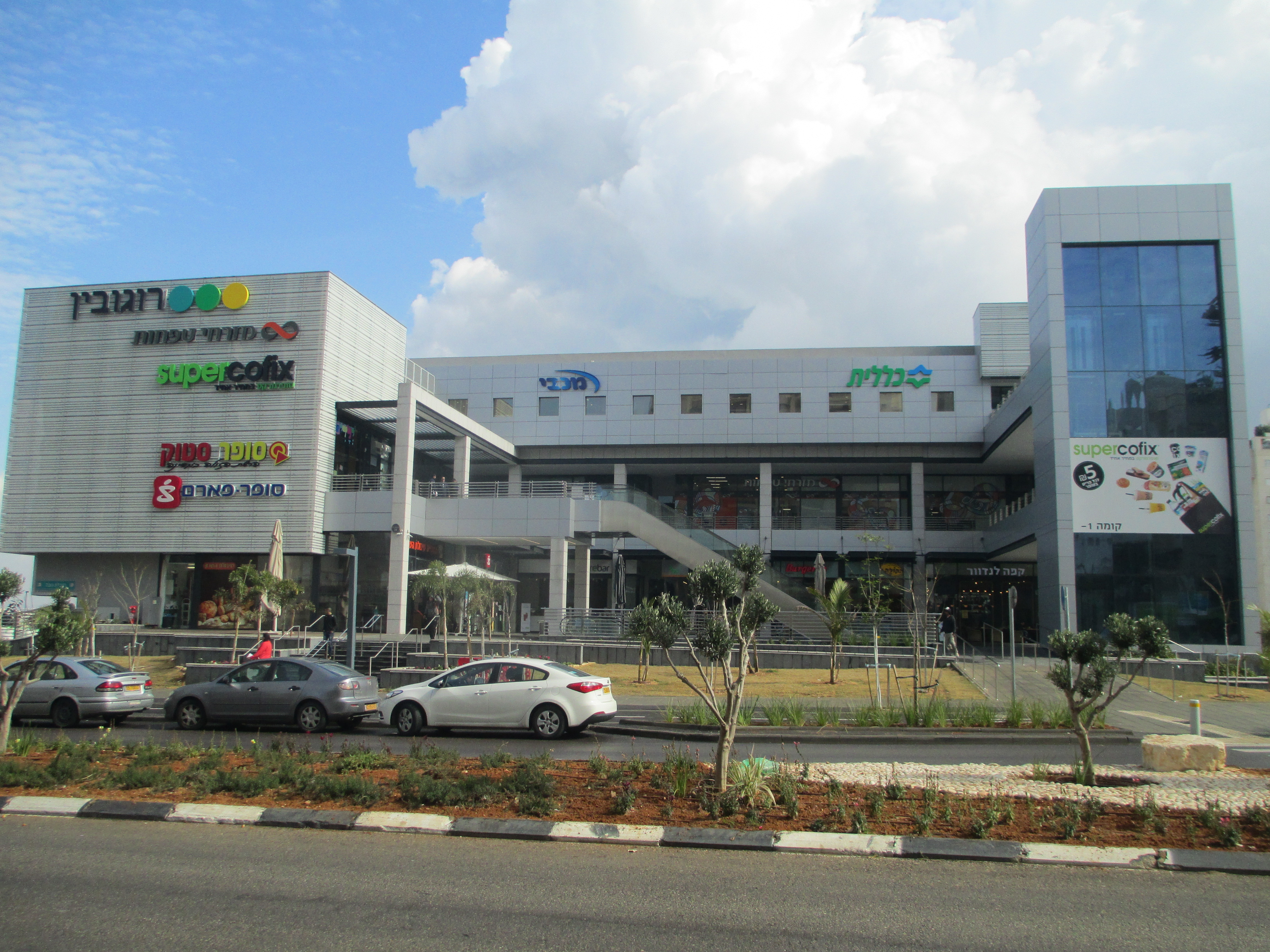
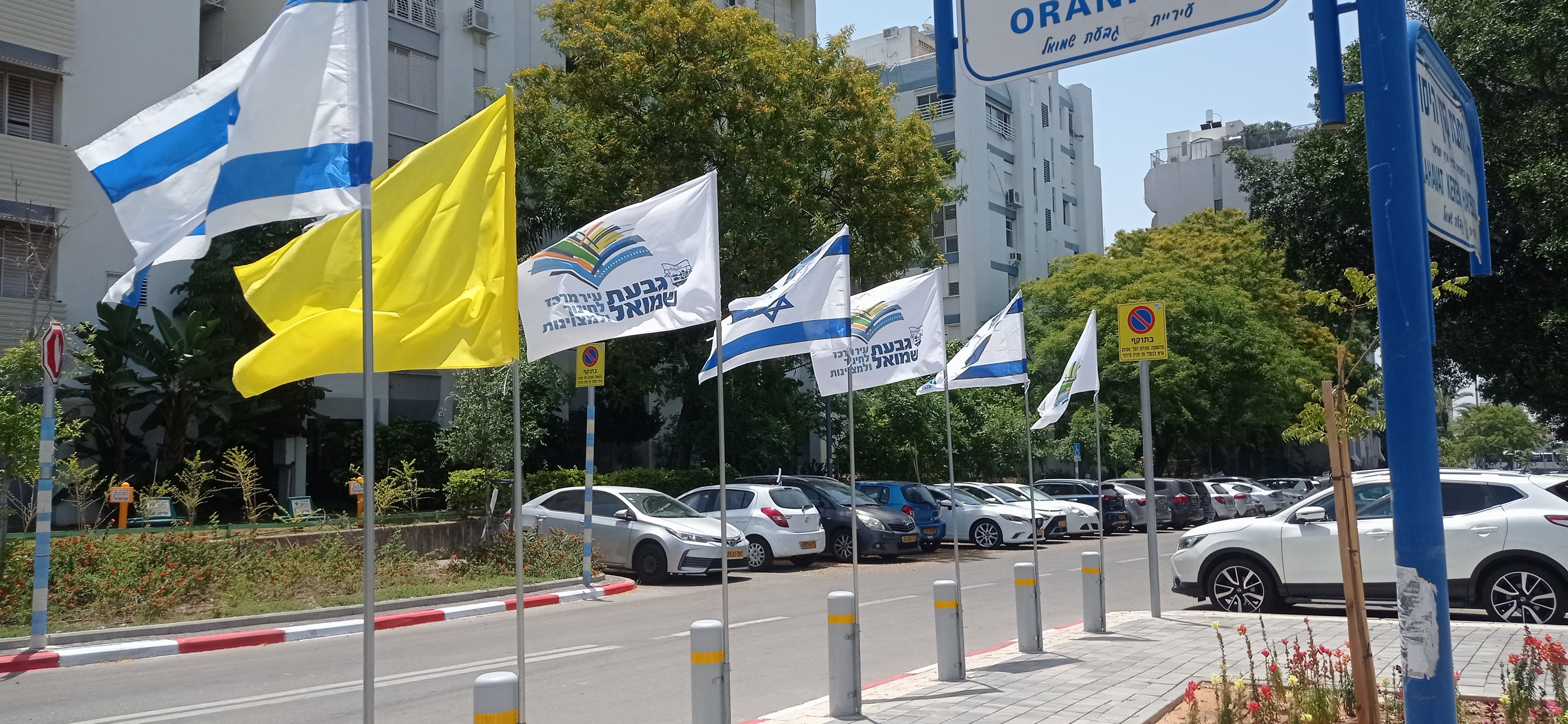

- Coat of arms

- Location within Central Israel Location within Israel
- Coordinates: 32°4′41″N 34°50′51″E
- Country: Israel
- District: Central
- Subdistrict: Petah Tikva
- Natural Region: Petah Tikva
- Founded: 1944
- City status: 2007

Government
  - Mayor: Yossi Brodny (Yisrael Beiteinu)

Area
  - Total: 2,579 dunams (2.579 km^{2}; 0.996 sq mi)

Population (2024)
  - Total: 29,405
  - Density: 11,400/km^{2} (29,530/sq mi)

Ethnicity
  - Jews and others: 99.8%
  - Arabs: 0.2%

Giv'at Shmuel (Hebrew: גבעת שמואל, lit. 'Samuel's Hill') is a city in the Center District of Israel. It is located in the eastern part of the Gush Dan metropolitan area and bordered by Ramat Gan and Bnei Brak to the West, Kiryat Ono to the South and Petah Tikva to the East and North. In 2024 it had a population of 29,405.

== History ==
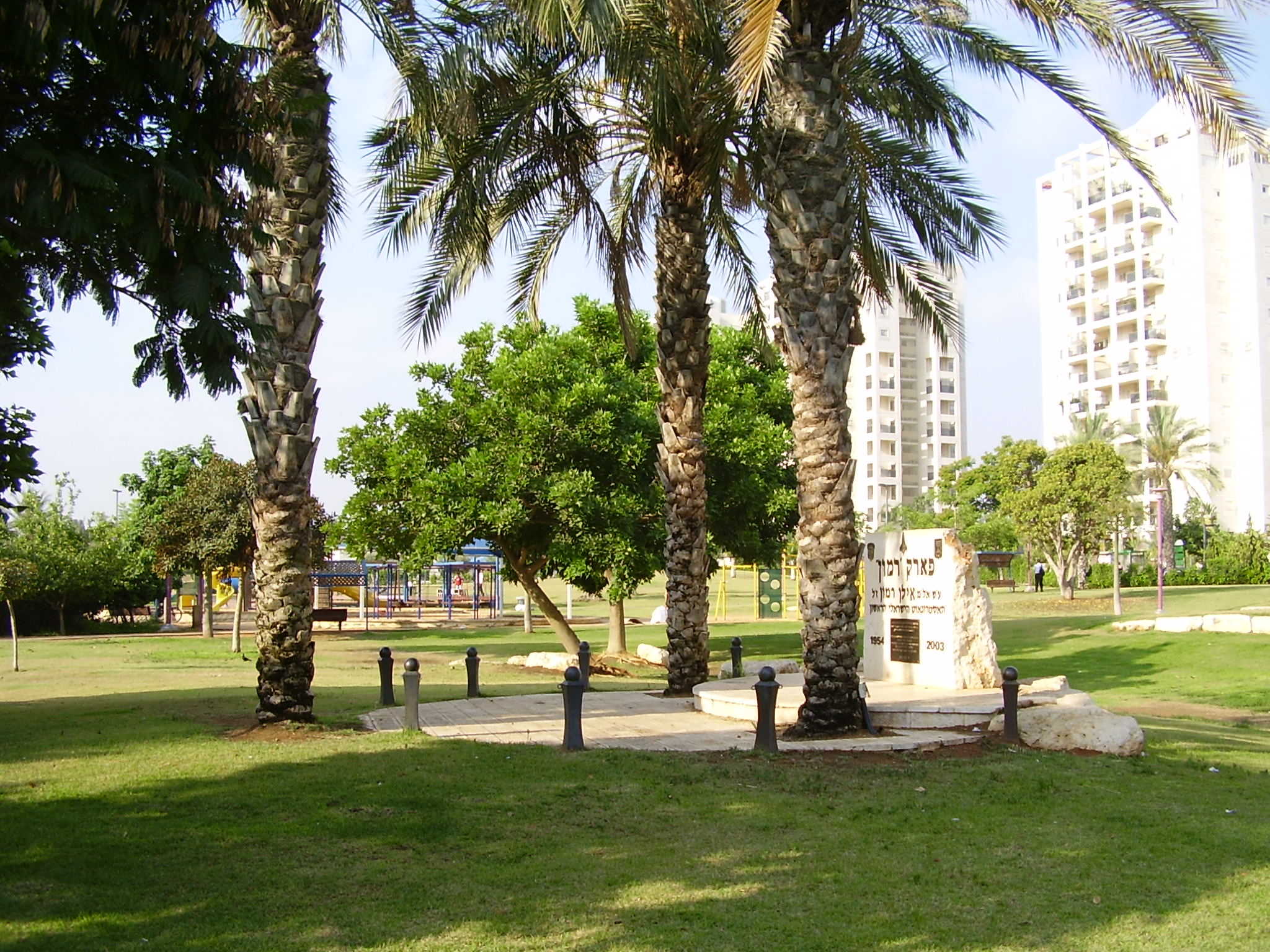
Ilan Ramon memorial park

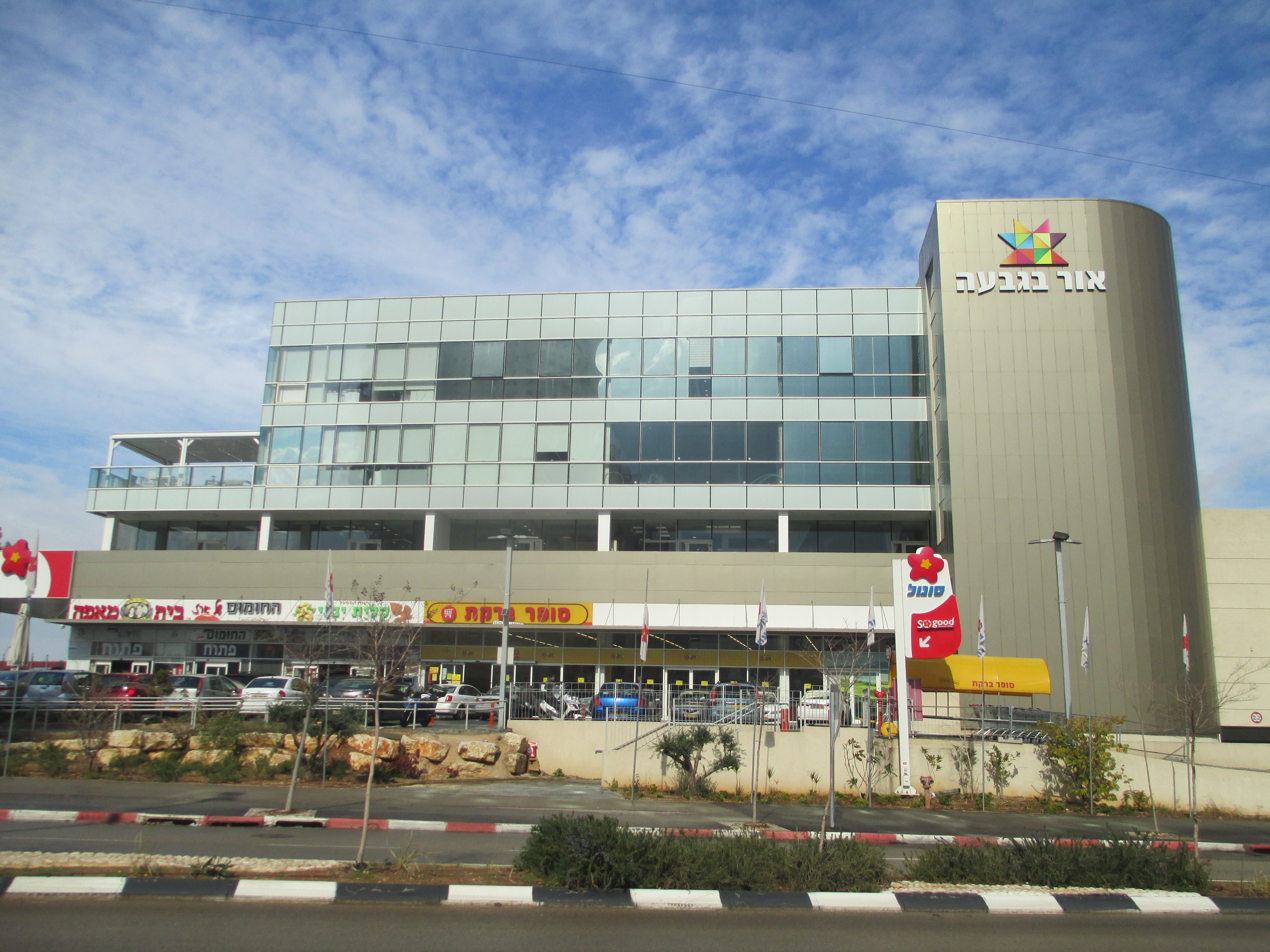
Or Bagiva mall

Giv'at Shmuel was founded in 1944. It was named for the Romanian Zionist leader Samuel Pineles, founder and president of the Zionist Congress in Focșani and Vice-President of the First Zionist Congress in Basel. On November 5, 2007, the Israeli Minister of Interior accepted a committee recommendation to change the municipal status of Giv'at Shmuel to 'city'.

== Demographics ==
Year	Population
1972	5,000
1983	7,900
1995	10,400
2008	21,000
2022	27,472
2024	29,405

At the end of 2019, the population of Givat Shmuel numbered 26,578 with a growth rate of 2.1%, and with the building of new neighborhoods is planned to grow to 40,000. Demographics are mixed religious/secular, with a socioeconomic standing of 8/10.

Amongst immigrants from English-speaking countries, Giv'at Shmuel is home to Israel's largest community of lone immigrants, at approximately 950 students, young professionals, newly married couples and young families. It also has the highest rate of "successful aliyah" - the number of immigrants who remain in Israel after 5 years - in the country. Since 2013, Nefesh B'Nefesh has organized various events and activities, and works with the local authorities to expand programming. The GSC - Givat Shmuel Community (R.A.) was formed, creating an infrastructural backbone for English-speaking activities in the area.

== Education ==
- Daycare and preschool education: In 2020–2021, there were 45 public preschools (secular and national-religious, special-ed and regular education, and a Montessori option) and many private preschools and daycares.
- Primary education: There are two secular primary schools, Yigal Alon and Ben Gurion, and three national-religious primary school, Moreshet Zvulun, Moreshet Menachem, and Moreshet Neria.
- Secondary education: There is a secular co-ed high school, Tichon Givat Shmuel, and two national-religious high schools: Ulpnanat Amit for girls and Yeshivat Bnei Akiva for boys. Some residents commute to high schools outside of the city as well. In 2019-20, 96.5% of the high school students in Giv'at Shmuel completed their bagrut (high school matriculation) certification.[5]
- Higher education: Adjacent to the South-Western edge of Giv'at Shmuel is the campus of Bar Ilan University. While technically in Ramat Gan, the campus has been expanding in recent years to the effect that it now separates (and connects) the southern Ramat Ilan neighbourhood of Giv'at Shmuel from the rest of the city.

== Sports ==
Maccabi Habik'a, formerly Elitzur Givat Shmuel, is a basketball team that played in Ligat HaAl, the top division of Israeli basketball, until relegation in 2007. The team reached the State Cup final in 2003, but lost to Maccabi Tel Aviv.

In 2010, an annual 10 km (6 mi) race was inaugurated with 350 runners from all over the country.

== Landmarks ==
A leisure and sports center was established on an area of about 32 dunams (8 acres) in northeastern Giv'at Shmuel which incorporates tennis courts, fitness rooms, swimming pools, a roller skating rink, a cafeteria and other services, along with water park, covering an area of about 5 dunams (1.25 acre).

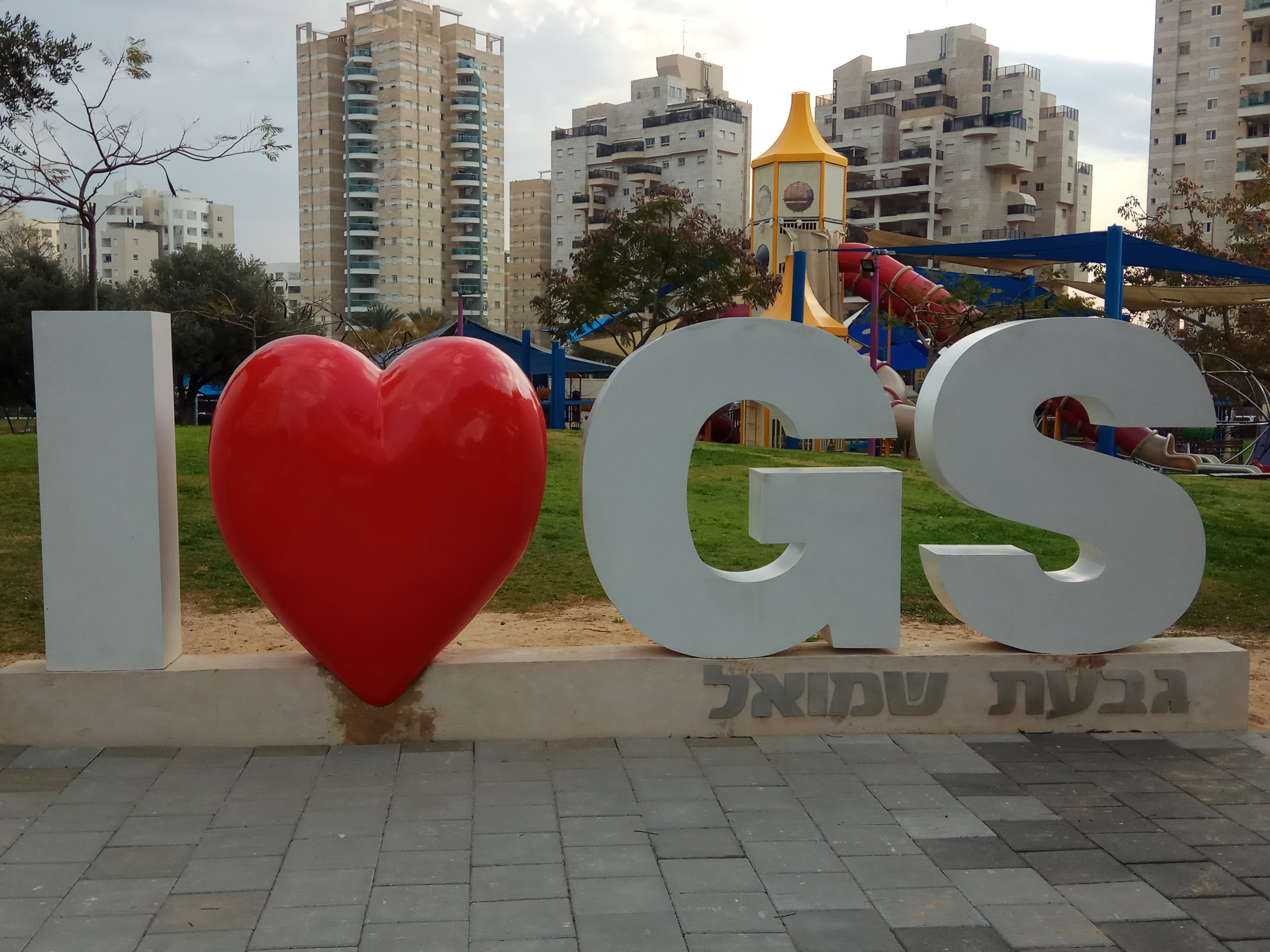
Ilan Ramon Park

In the center of town there is a park and playground named after the Israeli astronaut, Ilan Ramon who died in the Space Shuttle Columbia disaster.

== Voting Patterns ==
In the 2022 election, 56 percent of voters in Giv'at Shmuel voted for the parties of the right-wing coalition led by Benjamin Netanyahu, while 33 percent voted for the parties of the center-left coalition led by Yair Lapid and 0.2 percent voted for the Arab parties.

In the 2026 election, 49 percent of voters in Giv'at Shmuel voted for the parties of the right-wing coalition led by Benjamin Netanyahu, while 38 percent voted for the parties of the center-left coalition led by Gadi Eisenkot and 0.3 percent voted for the Arab parties. An additional 4 percent voted for the Reservists, and 7.4 percent voted for Amcha Yisrael. Voter turnout increased 19 percent from the 2022 election.

== Twin towns – sister cities ==
- Dubna, Russia
- Gołdap, Poland
- Stade, Germany

== Notable people ==
- Levana Moshon (born 1952), writer, journalist, teacher and children's storyteller
- Michal Woldiger (born 1969), Religious Zionism member of Knesset and attorney
- Tali Gottlieb (born 1975), Likud member of Knesset and attorney
- Lea Nass, former Member of Knesset
- Nahum Langental, former Member of Knesset
- Moshe Klughaft, strategic advisor and campaign manager
- Uzi Hitman, singer, songwriter and cultural icon
- Ariel Beit-Halahmy, basketball and national team coach
- Yair Naveh, former deputy IDF Chief of Staff

== Gallery ==
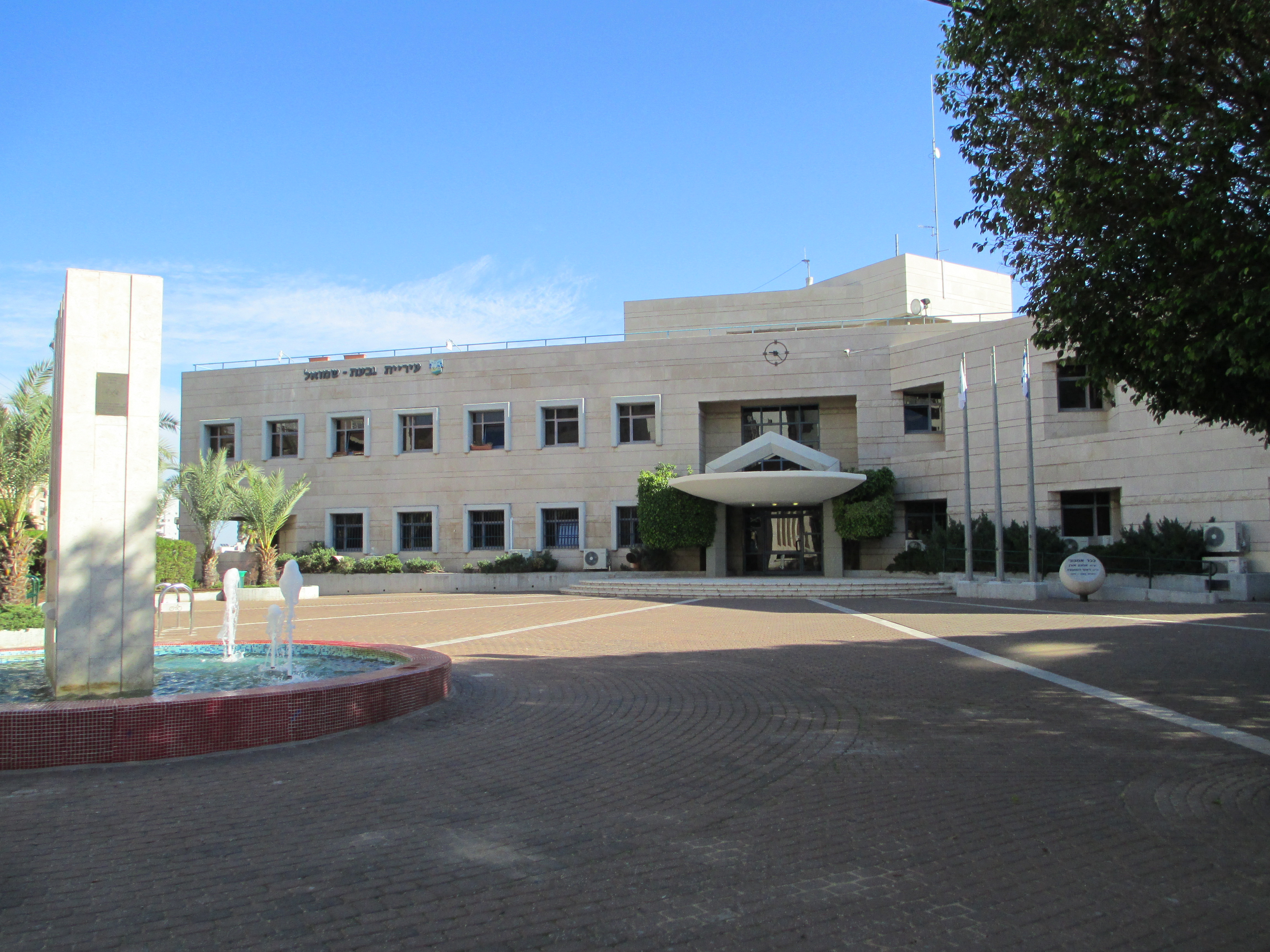
Municipality of Givat Shmuel

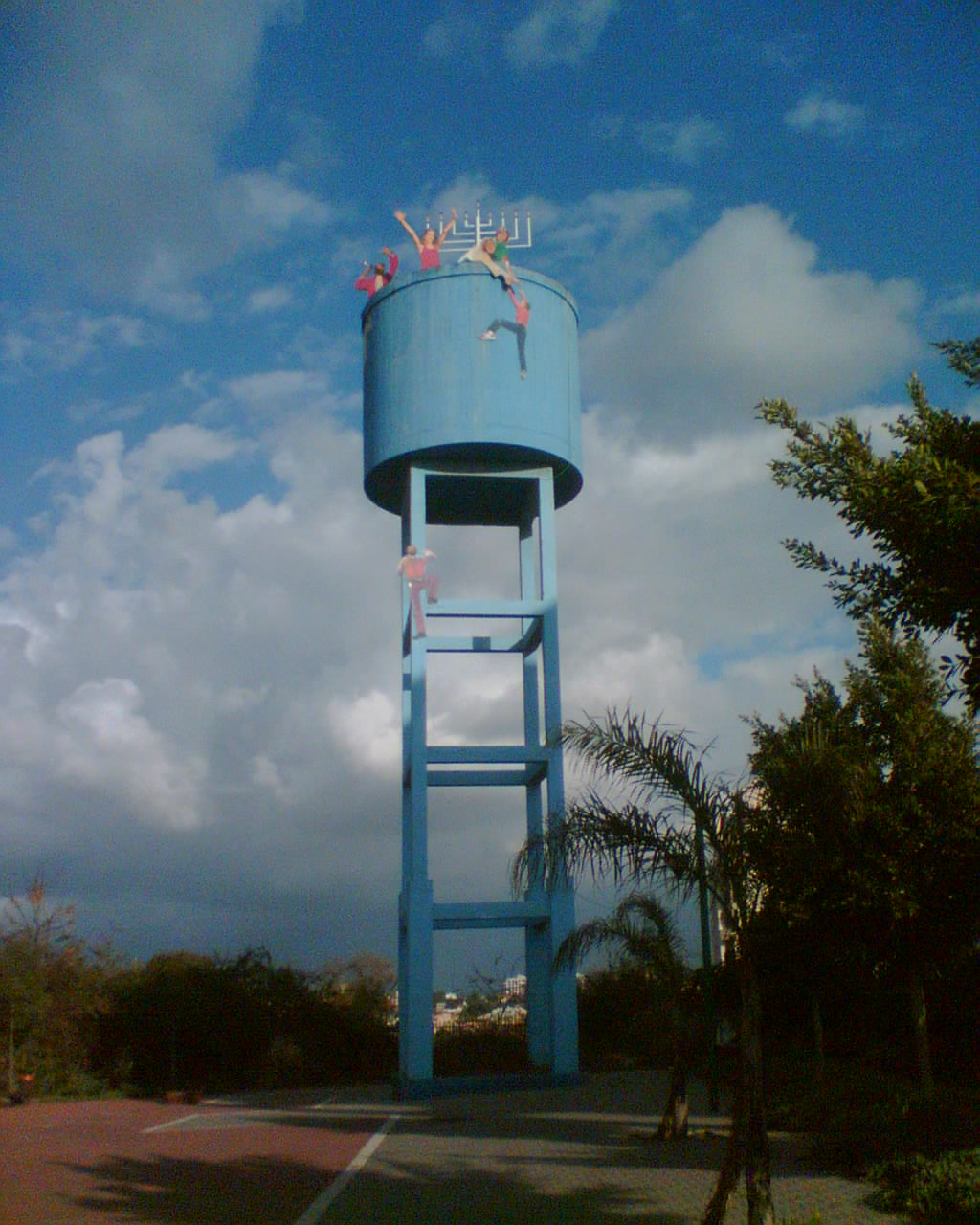
Historic water tower

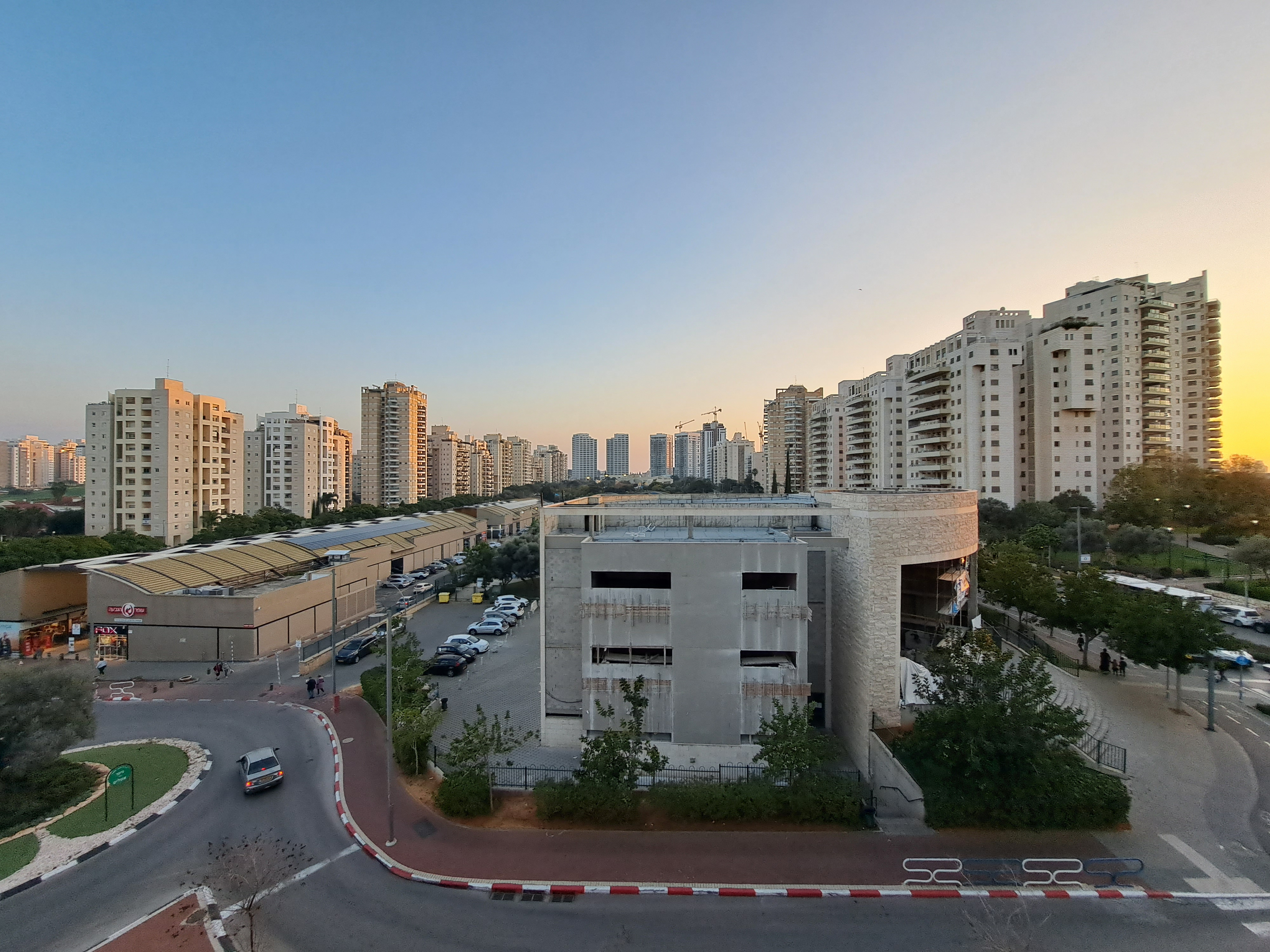
Ramat-Hadar neighborhood
