= Second Zionist Congress =

1898 meeting of the World Zionist Organization

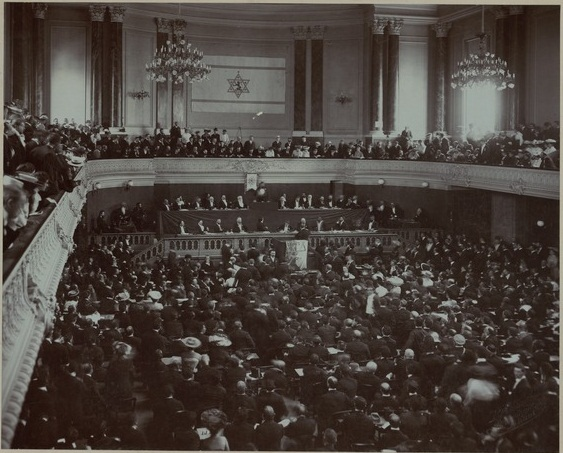
- Herzl addressing the Second Zionist Congress
- Genre: Zionist Congress
- Date: August 28–30, 1898
- Venue: Stadtcasino Basel
- Locations: Basel, Switzerland
- Previous event: First Zionist Congress
- Next event: Third Zionist Congress
- Participants: 400 delegates
- Organiser: Zionist Organization
- Outcome: Formation of the Jewish Colonial Trust and expansion of the Zionist Organization

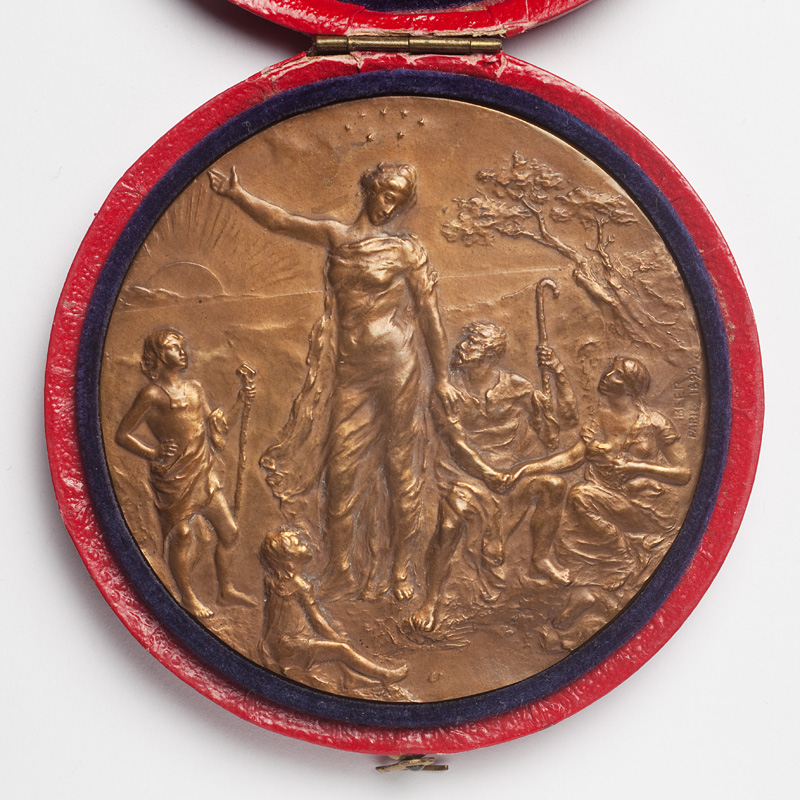
Medal from the Second Zionist Congress, 1898. In the collection of the Jewish Museum of Switzerland.

The Second World Zionist Congress met in Basel, Switzerland on 28 August 1898. and was the second meeting of the Zionist Organisation held at the Stadtcasino in Basel, Switzerland. The Zionist Congress brought together delegates from across the world to raise funds, lobby support, and create the institutions for the Zionist movement, which sought to establish a Jewish State in Palestine. The main focus of the Second Congress, as set out by its chair, Theodor Herzl, was to engage with Jewish communities in the diaspora and encourage them to adopt Zionism.

The three day congress established the Jewish Colonial Fund (later called the Anglo-Palestine Bank) whose aim was to fund the successful migration of Jews to Palestine, as well as the establishment of a Committee on Culture. Other notable events of the congress were the presentation of an early prototype of the modern day Israeli flag, and the arrival of the first delegates of Labor Zionism to the Congress.

== History ==
Theodor Herzl, the founder of Political Zionism, proposed in his 1896 pamphlet 'Der Judenstaat' that Jews would continue to face anti-Semitism in the diaspora until they were able to have self-determination in their own state. He began to lobby for the creation of a Jewish State, and formed the World Zionist Organisation (WZO) in 1897. In August that year, the organisation met at the First Zionist Congress. It was there that it was decided that the Jewish State should be established in the region of Palestine, then under the rule of the Ottoman Empire. The region was chosen as it had been the historic land of the ancient Jews before the beginning of the Jewish Diaspora in 70 C.E.

== Agenda ==
Herzl's main focus for the Second Congress was to discuss how to generate more support from Jewish communities across the world for the Zionist movement. A modern Jewish State could not be formed without significant international support and a population of Jews large enough to sustain a state. This would necessitate a large-scale immigration of Jews from Europe and America to the area of Syria-Palestine to cultivate the land and create institutions necessary for a state to exist. Therefore, the Second Congress was dedicated to creating these institutions and supporting existing communities in the area, as well as lobbying Jewish communities for support.

The Congress ran on an identical program to that of the First Congress. The proceedings began with formal opening speeches from the Chairman and Vice-Chairman, and voting was held to elect the new members of the executive team and members of the Zionist General Council. In the following days, representatives of Zionist Institutions from various countries gave over reports, and voting was conducted to ratify their conclusions.

=== Day 1: 28 August 1898: Introductory Speeches ===
The Congress began with an opening address by Herzl. In it, he called upon the members of the Jewish Diaspora to embrace and support Political Zionism. In his opening speech he stated that "The same people who reproach us that Zionism creates new barriers between mankind, find fault with us for aspiring to the friendship of Christian Zionists...the authority of the religious community, the means which it commands, and the persons who constitute it, must not be directed against the aspirations of the people ... Our next objective is therefore the conquest of the communities." He also emphasised the need to secure a piece of land for the establishment of the state, explicitly referring to the region of 'Syria-Palestine' and is quoted saying that "We are ready to bring about the reconstruction of Judaism; we have everything in abundance, men, material and plans. What we require is the soil...no one will deny that there is an unbreakable connection between our people and this land."

After Herzl's opening speech, Vice-Chairperson Max Nordau gave his own speech and the schedule for the remaining three days was announced. After the formalities of the opening speeches, various spokespersons from the committees established at the First Zionist Congress announced their progress in the preceding year. The Major progressions were that 913 Zionist Societies were currently in operation across the world, and the organisations treasury had raised 60,000 francs for the WZO treasury.

=== Day 2: 29 August 1898: Colonisation ===
The main focus of the day was the discussion of the potential for "colonisation" of the area of Palestine and different programs for the movement of large amounts of Jews from Europe to the new land. Leo Motzkin had been sent by Herzl the previous year to inspect the existing colonies of Jewish Settlements that already existed in the region, and he gave his report predicting what its future progress would look like. The main issue facing the Congress with regards to the colonisation of the land was the large population of Arab tribes living in the area, with 92% of the population of Syria-Palestine being Arabic. There was an acknowledgement that any removal of Arabs from the area had to be done with diplomatic care, so as to not cause conflict with Ottoman, Arabic or British parties. The WZO did not come to a conclusion as to what was to be done with the Arab population during the Second Congress.

=== Day 3: 30 August 1898: The Jewish Colonial Fund and the Committee on Culture ===
The third day of the Congress established the Jewish Colonial Fund. The Fund was established with 2 million pounds sterling and was given its own committee who were tasked with setting up branches of it in their respective countries, with its main Headquarters in London, England. On this day they also set out the fund's five objectives for the general area of "Palestine and Syria". The first was the establishment of various insurance and shipping companies that would aid in the future mobilisation of Jewish Labour. The second was that it was to provide financial support for small agricultural societies to develop. Thirdly, it would organise trade in and out of the new State. Its fourth objective was to finance the acquisition of key infrastructure such as roads, mines and harbour works. Finally, it would facilitate the establishment of separate banks for each of these endeavours.

== Delegates ==
The number of members had doubled since the First Congress in 1897, with 400 delegates coming together from Austria, France, England, Russia, Prussia and Argentine Republic. The Second Congress saw the first appearance in the WZO of several figures who would become key players in the future establishment of the State, such as Chaim Weizmann, and Menachem Ussishkin. The notable delegates are outlined in the table below:

| Delegate | Image | Type of Zionism | Notable For | Role in Congress |
|---|---|---|---|---|
| Theodor Herzl | Theodor Herzl | Political Zionism | Herzl was an Austro-Hungarian Jew and is known as the 'Father of Political Zionism' as he is responsible for starting the World Zionist Organisation and the Zionist Congress. He died in 1904 before seeing the state of Israel established, but is celebrated in modern day Israel as the visionary behind the country's existence. | Chair of the Zionist Congress |
| Max Nordau | Max Nordau | Political Zionism | Nordau co-founded the World Zionist Organisation along with Herzl, and helped to give the congress legitimacy and fame due to his reputation as being a respected journalist and Intellectual. He pushed Herzl to establish the Congress, in order to rebut those who claimed that Zionism was not democratic. | Nordau was the Vice-Chairperson of the World Zionist Organisation under Herzl. |
| Chaim Weizmann | Chaim Weizmann | Political Zionism | Weizmann became a significant zionistic figure after he helped to campaign for the signing of the Balfour Declaration in 1917. He later became the president of the World Zionist Organisation in 1920, and was the first President of Israel. | This congress was Weizmann's first attendance at a Zionist Congress. He was unable to attend the first Congress due to difficulty in travel. |
| Menachem Ussishkin | Menachem Ussishkin | Labour Zionism and Cultural Zionism | Ussishkin was a Belarusian Jew who was involved in the Hovevei Zion movement and was closely allied with Achad Ha'am. In 1923 became the head of the Jewish National Fund and advocated for further settlement of the land and an increase in land acquisitions. Several streets in modern day Israel now bear his name. | Served as Secretary of the Second Zionist Congresses. |
| Nachman Syrkin | Nachman Syrkin | Socialist Zionism | Syrkin was an early developer of the Jewish National Fund and was a staunch socialist. He was the first to suggest the concept of the collective settlement (later known as a 'Kibbutz'). | Syrkin was the leader of the Socialist Zionist faction of the Zionist Congress. |

== Outcomes of the Congress ==
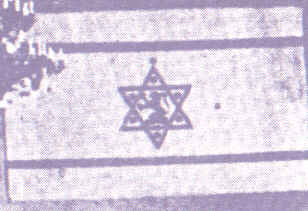
Proposed flag for the future state that was used in the Second Congress. It bears resemblance to the modern flag, with the Star of David and two blue stripes, but also features a lion and five stars in its centre.

=== Changes to the Congress Representation ===
It was at the second Congress that two significant amendments were made to the representative bodies: The first was that women were allowed to become members and vote. The second was that a delegation of socialists were admitted to the Congress. The official admission of socialists to the Congress was significant in that it defied anti-zionist sentiment felt by Socialist groups prior to 1898. Previously, zionism was seen as antithetical to the socialist cause because the migration of Jewry to Palestine would remove working class Jews from the class struggle in their respective countries. Additionally, it was believed that if socialism were to triumph, all forms of discrimination would be abolished, including anti-semitism, and the need for a Jewish State would become obsolete. When the Socialist Zionists attended the Second Congress they demanded that working class Jews receive official representation in the WZO, and that the interests of international socialism would be considered. Though they were initially met with opposition by Herzl who did not wish to create more factions in the Zionist body, they were finally admitted in 1898.

=== Adoption of the Flag ===
An early prototype of the modern-day Israeli Flag was presented and consequently adopted on the third day of the Congress. The flag was presented by Rabbi Jacob Baruch Askowith. Askowith was an American Jew who had created it in 1891 for a local Zionist movement in Boston called B'nai Zion ('Sons of Zion'), where it gained popularity as a Zionist flag. It featured two blue stripes on a white background with a Star of David in its centre, and the word "Zion" in the middle of the star. The design was adopted by Herzl, who then removed the words and added a lion reared on its hind legs in the centre of the star, with seven stars printed into each of the star's points. This version of the flag bears strong resemblance to the modern-day flag of Israel, and was adopted for the Second Congress. Due to its American origin, the basic design was adopted in 1948 due to the amount of American Jews who voted for it when the modern state of Israel was established.

=== Committee on Culture ===
The Flag of Israel used today (pictured above) is very similar to the one that was proposed to the Second Zionist Congress in 1898.

The committee was established on the final day of the Congress after some controversy. Oscar Marmorek proposed a list of members for the committee which was rejected by Nachman Syrkin because there was an over-representation of Orthodox Rabbis on the proposed list. Debate ensued but the list was accepted nonetheless. The aims of the Committee were based upon Leo Motzkins report on his visit to Palestine. Motzkin's report revealed attempts at spoken modern Hebrew, and it was decided that the WZO would support the revival of the Hebrew Language and subsequent literature, as well as focus resources into establishing a 'zionistic culture' in the new settlements. This would include establishing more schools and expanding the existing ones in Jaffa.

== Opposition ==
Although the Congress had doubled in size, there was still significant opposition in Jewish communities worldwide to the WZO and its aims. Opposition came from various Jewish factions. Most notable of the opposition was Asher Ginsburg (more commonly known as 'Achad Ha'am') who had attended the first congress in 1897 but refused to attend the Second. He believed that Herzl did not understand the plight of Eastern European Jewry, who had already established Jewish settlements in Palestine following a wave of Anti-Jewish pogroms in 1881 under the banner of the "Hovevei Zion" or, "Lovers of Zion". Accordingly, Herzl was too 'western' and therefore did not have the authority to interfere with the workings of Hovevei Zion or instruct them as to how to grow their settlements. Ginsburg also saw the Congress as futile, in that a Jewish State could not be created until there was a significant number of Jews willing to live and cultivate the area of Palestine. He stated that the efforts of the WZO were ineffectual until there were 10,000 Jews living and farming in Palestine

The Congress was also opposed by many Orthodox Jewish factions, who believed that the Jewish People are not intended to re-cultivate the ancient land of Judea until such time as the Messiah were to arrive. Additionally, many would not support a secular Jewish State, maintaining that Jews could only live in a Jewish State in which the laws were in accordance with Torah law. Attempts at concessions to the orthodox zionistic factions were made accordingly, with the congress issuing a statement saying: "Zionism aspires not only to the economic and political renewal of the Jewish people, but also to its spiritual revival based on achievements of modern culture. Zionism would not take any steps which would contradict Jewish religious law."

== See also ==
- Types of Zionism
- History of Zionism
- Sixth Zionist Congress

== Bibliography ==
- Atmaca, Ayşe Ömür (15 July 2016). "Roots of Labor Zionism: Israel as the New Land of Socialist Ideas?". Ortadoğu Etütleri. 4 (1): 165–192. ProQuest 1510109578.
- Berenbaum, Michael; Skolnik, Fred, eds. (2007). Encyclopaedia Judaica. Vol. 19 (2nd ed.). Macmillan Reference USA. pp. 398–400.
- Getzel, Kressel (2007). "Zionist Congresses". Encyclopedia Judaica. pp. 627–636.
- Goldstein, Yossi (2010). "Eastern Jews vs. Western Jews: the Ahad Ha'am-Herzl dispute and its cultural and social implications". Jewish History. 24 (3/4): 355–377. doi:10.1007/s10835-010-9119-6. JSTOR 40864858. S2CID 154798556.
- Kerr, Anne; Wright, Edmund, eds. (2015). "Zionism". A Dictionary of World History. Oxford University Press. ISBN 978-0-19-968569-1.
- McCarthy, Caleb (2012). "Palestine". Encyclopedia of Global Religion. doi:10.4135/9781412997898.n551. ISBN 9780761927297.
- Mendes, H. Pereira (1898). "The Zionist Conference at Basle". The North American Review. 167 (504): 625–628. JSTOR 25119100.
- Heymann, Michael (September 1995). "Max Nordau at the early Zionist Congresses, 1897–1905". Journal of Israeli History. 16 (3): 245–256. doi:10.1080/13531049508576065.
- "How Israel can trace its flag's roots to Boston". The Jerusalem Post. 16 December 2016.
- Rinott, Moshe (March 1984). "Religion and education: The cultural question and the Zionist movement, 1897–1913". Studies in Zionism. 5 (1): 1–17. doi:10.1080/13531048408575851.
- Levy, Nissim (28 November 2019). "Theodor Herzl: From vision to reality". The Jerusalem Post.
- Schulman, Jason (2003). "The Life and Death of Socialist Zionism". New Politics. 9 (3): 127. ProQuest 194909346.
- "The Second Zionist Congress Convenes". (2019). Retrieved from https://israeled.org/second-zionist-congress-convenes/
- "Jewish Colonial Trust". (2019). Retrieved from https://www.jewishvirtuallibrary.org/jewish-colonial-trust
- "First Zionist Congress & Basel Program (1897)". (2019). Retrieved from https://www.jewishvirtuallibrary.org/first-zionist-congress-and-basel-program-1897
