= Chaim David Lippe =

Austrian-Jewish publisher and bibliographer

- Born: December 22, 1823; Stanisławów, Galicia
- Died: August 26, 1900 (aged 76); Vienna, Austria-Hungary
- Writing career
- Literary movement: Haskalah

Chaim David Lippe (Yiddish: חיים דוד ליפפא; December 22, 1823 – August 26, 1900) was an Austrian-Jewish publisher and bibliographer.

== Biography ==
Chaim David Lippe was born in 1823 in Stanisławów, Galicia (today Ivano-Frankivsk, Ukraine). He later relocated to Tschernowitz (today Czernowitz, Ukraine) and Eperies (today Prešov, Slovakia), where he took on the roles of teacher and cantor.

In 1873, Lippe settled in Vienna, where he ran a Jewish publishing-house, which issued several popular works. He himself edited a bibliographical lexicon of modern Jewish literature, Ch. D. Lippe's Bibliographisches Lexicon der Gesammten Jüdischen Literatur der Gegenwart und Address-Anzeiger (Vienna, 1881; 2nd edition, 1900).

His brother was the Zionist activist Dr. Karpel Lippe.
