= Traître =

Traître may refer to:

- Le Traitre, pamphlet by Jacques Bahar 1898
- Le Traître, novel by André Gorz 1958
- Baie des Traitres
- "Traîtres", song by Lacrim 2017
