= 1881 Focșani Zionist Congress =

1881 event in Romania

The Focșani Zionist Congress was held on 30–31 December 1881 in Focșani, Romania. It is considered by many scholars and historians to be the first organized Zionist congress, preceding Theodor Herzl's First Zionist Congress in Basel by sixteen years. The congress marked a foundational moment for the Zionist movement, especially in promoting Jewish emigration and agricultural colonization of Eretz Israel (then under Ottoman rule).

The conference was covered by the international press, making a significant impression.

== Historical background ==
After Romania gained independence from the Ottoman Empire in 1878, it was required by the Congress of Berlin to grant civil rights to all citizens, including Jews. However, the Romanian government did not implement this, and antisemitic policies and discrimination against Romanian Jews continued (some of them became even stronger under the premiership of Ion C. Brătianu).

At the same time, pogroms in the Russian Empire, especially in 1881, triggered a wave of Jewish emigration and fueled proto-Zionist movements such as Hovevei Zion. Romanian Jews, facing similar challenges, began organizing for a national solution centered on settlement in the Land of Israel.

== Organization ==
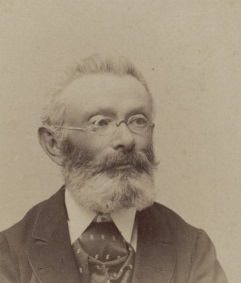
Writer Israel Teller was a member of the presidency of the Congress. He was one of the founders of the city of Rehovot

The congress was initiated by the Union of Romanian Jewish Students, which later became the Union of Romanian Zionists. It was held at the Jewish communal school in Focșani. The event was presided over by Samuel Pineles, a leading Jewish figure from Galați. The city of Focșani was chosen because it was regarded as a symbol of unity of the Romanians, due to the unification of Moldavia and Wallachia, which formed Romania. It allowed for an analogy that the Jewish people must unite to become stronger.

A total of 51 delegates participated, representing 32 Jewish communities from cities such as Galați, Iași, Brăila, Bârlad, and Piatra Neamț, but also from the Russian Empire and Austria-Hungary and non-Jews (such as Laurence Oliphant). At the congress, the Hatikvah anthem was first sung, as the national anthem of the Jews.

== Proceedings and resolutions ==
The congress focused on practical steps for Jewish emigration and settlement in Palestine. Among the resolutions adopted were:

- Establishment of a central committee to coordinate emigration.
- Promotion of Jewish agricultural labor and self-sufficiency.
- Support for the creation of agricultural colonies in Ottoman Palestine.
- Emphasis on national identity and practical Zionism.

Delegates advocated for an active role in shaping the Jewish future, without waiting passively for messianic redemption.

== Legacy ==
Although it did not have the international prominence of the 1897 First Zionist Congress, the Focșani Congress played a key role in the early Zionist movement. It laid the ideological groundwork for the First Aliyah, which soon followed.

Romanian Jews inspired by the congress helped establish early settlements such as Rosh Pinna and Zikhron Ya'akov.

In 2011, the 130th anniversary of the congress was commemorated with events in Focșani and Bucharest, acknowledging its significance in the broader history of Zionism.

== See also ==
- First Zionist Congress
- Hovevei Zion
- First Aliyah
- Samuel Pineles
- Zionism
- History of the Jews in Romania
