= Samuel Pineles =

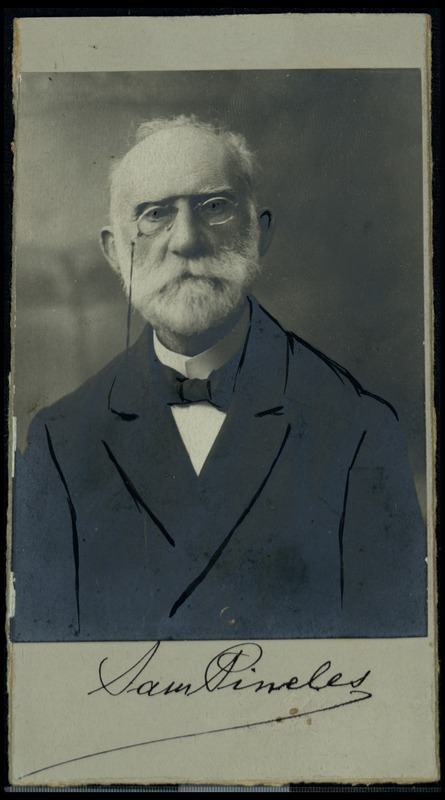
- Born: 23 July 1843; Brody, Austrian Empire
- Died: 1928; Galați, Kingdom of Romania
- Other names: שמואל פינלס
- Known for: Zionism

Samuel Pineles (Hebrew: שמואל פינלס; 23 July 1843, in Brody, Galicia, Austrian Empire – 1928, in Galați, Romania) was a Jewish Romanian philanthropist and Religious Zionist activist. He was the driving force behind the 1881 Romanian Zionist meeting in Focșani. He was the president and secretary of the Central Committee to Settle the Land of Israel and Syria and was active in Hovevei Zion in Romania.

Samuel Pineles was born in shtetl of Brody in Galicia, the son of scholar and author Mendel Pineles. At age 17, their family settled in Galați, where Pineles was successful in business, contributing to the prosperity of the Galați port. He became one of the pillars of philanthropy in Romania's Jewish community. He helped settle refugees who fled the pogroms in the Russian Empire and later helped Jewish refugees fleeing the Soviet authorities.

Pineles helped organize the immigration of Jews to the towns of Rosh Pina and Zichron Yaakov. After the advent of Theodor Herzl's Political Zionism, Pineles took up this idea with great enthusiasm. At the First Zionist Congress (Basel 1897) Pineles was elected as vice president, along with Max Nordau. Until his death in 1928, Pineles participated in every World Zionist Congress as a member of the Executive Committee of the World Zionist Organization.

The city of Givat Shmuel in central Israel was named for Samuel Pineles. Several streets in Israel are also named after him - in Jerusalem, Tel Aviv, and Zichron Yaakov. In 1965, Pineles' remains were reburied on Har HaMenuchot in Jerusalem.
