= International Congress of National Minorities =

The International Congress of National Minorities was an organization formed after World War I to lobby for the rights of ethnic and religious minorities and especially Jews living in the nations of Europe and much of Asia, especially in the aftermath of the collapse of the Austro-Hungarian Empire, the Ottoman Empire, the German Empire, and the Russian Empire. The organization helped in the construction of places of worship for Jews around the world. The body participated at the Paris Peace Conference, 1919 and later in the League of Nations. One of its most prominent leaders was the Zionist politician Leo Motzkin.

== See also ==
- Leo Motzkin
- World Zionist Congress
- Zionism
