= Abraham Salz =

Abraham Adolph Salz (c. 1864 in Tarnów – c. 1941) (אברהם זלץ) was a Galician Zionist, lawyer and initially leader of the Chowewe Zion.

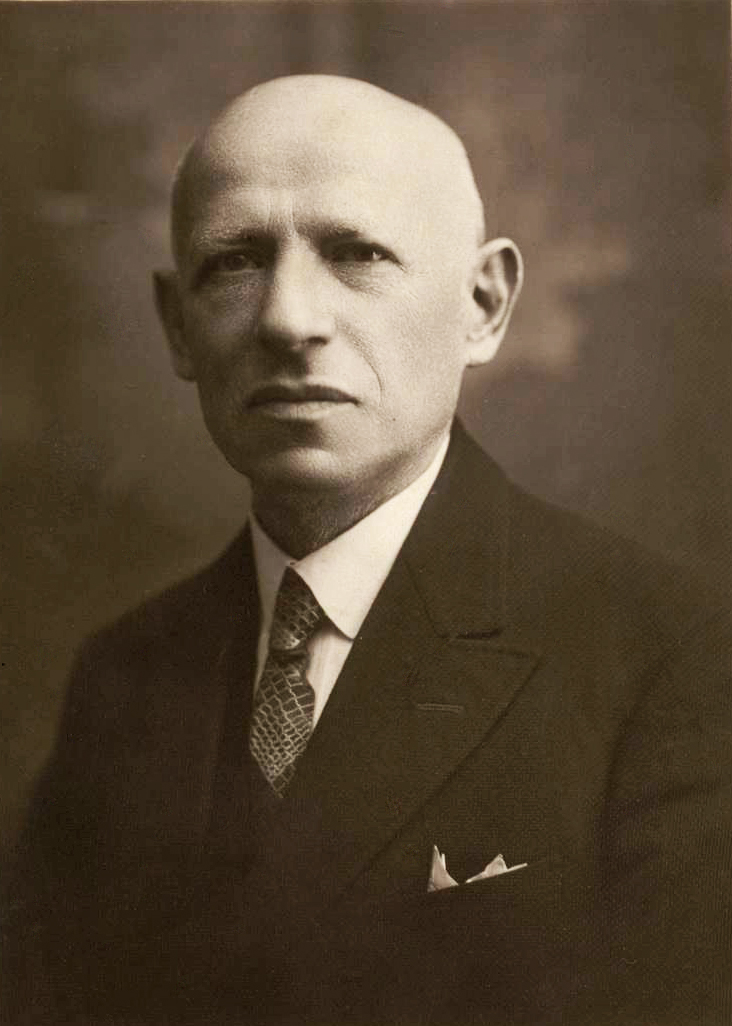
Abraham Salz.

== Early life ==
He studied law in Vienna until 1887 and practiced as a lawyer in the then Austrian-Galician Tarnów. He also wrote articles for the Lviv Young Zionist Polish weekly paper Przyszłość ("Future"), which he was a co-founder.

From 1884 he was active in the Kadimah (student union) . He was a participant in the first Zionist Congress and a member of the Grand Action Committee.

He was a follower of the petty colonization (and was gradually replaced by Herzl, supported the "Rebbe" of Czortkow in propagating his National Jewish ideas and plans for Palestinian colonization.

Salz was vice president of the Tarnów association "Ahavat Zion", founded in 1891, and supported Galatians in 1892/1893 from Nathan Birnbaum's preparation for the creation of the "Zion" association.

Abraham Salz was also the first party chairman of the Jewish-National Galicia. In 1899 he founded the settlement Machanajim in Galilee. To this end, he had gotten Herzl's approval (Salz had bought 10,000 Dunam Land from Edmond Rothschild in Paris in 1897 without previous consultation, which contradicted the clear decision of the Congress); ten years later, the settlement had to be abandoned again.

At the 8th Congress in August 1907 (The Hague, Chaim Weizmann, for the first time, the proposal of a Synthetic Zionism ), he was re-elected into the Grand Action Committee. In 1907 (in ) and in 1911 (in several constituencies) he ran unsuccessfully for the Reichsrat. As early as the beginning of 1897, Herzl had thought of joining him, together with Leon Kellner, in the Reichsrat and propagating Zionism there. After seeing that he was not going to penetrate, the project was dropped.
