= Hirsch Mendel Pineles =

- Born: December 21, 1805; Galician town of Tysmenytsia
- Died: August 6, 1870 (aged 64)
- Known for: Jewish scholar from Tysmenytsia

Hirsch Mendel Pineles (Dec 21. 1805-Aug 6. 1870) was a Ukrainian-Jewish scholar from the town of Tysmenytsia.

== Biography ==
Hirsch Mendel Pineles was born on Dec 21. 1805 in the Galician town of Tysmenytsia. He studied rabbinics there until the age of fifteen, after which he left the town. He then moved and settled in Brody, where he studied various secular sciences and joined the Maskilim. He married there and had a son, Samuel Pineles. On account of his study of secular sciences, the mostly Hasidic Jewish community in Brody accused him of heresy. In 1853 he then moved to Odessa, then in 1855 he moved to Galați, where he lived until his death in 1870.

== Writings ==
Mendel Pineles wrote several treatises on astronomy in various Jewish periodicals and newspapers. One of his most well-known is the "Darkah Shel Torah", a critical interpretation of various passages of the Talmud
