= Stadtcasino Basel =

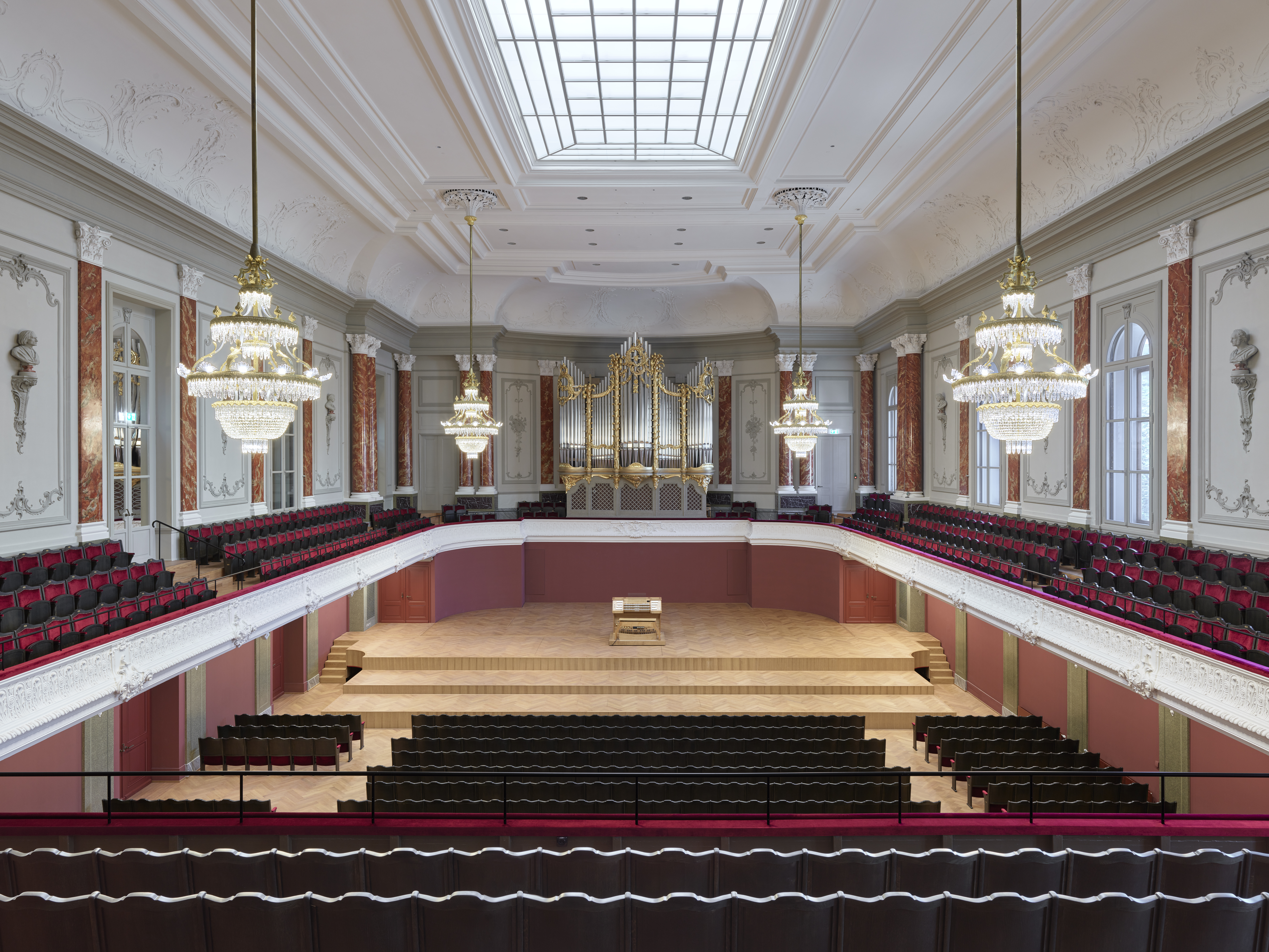
- Main concert hall
- Interactive map of the Stadtcasino Basel area

General information
- Location: Basel, Switzerland
- Coordinates: 47°33′16″N 7°35′22″E

Website
- www.stadtcasino-basel.ch/en/

Stadtcasino Basel is a concert hall in Basel, Switzerland.

It belongs to the Stadtcasino-Gesellschaft, a non-profit cultural association in Basel. The largest concert hall, the Musiksaal from 1876 with 1500 seats, is internationally renowned for its excellent acoustics and is the home base of the Sinfonieorchester Basel.

== History ==
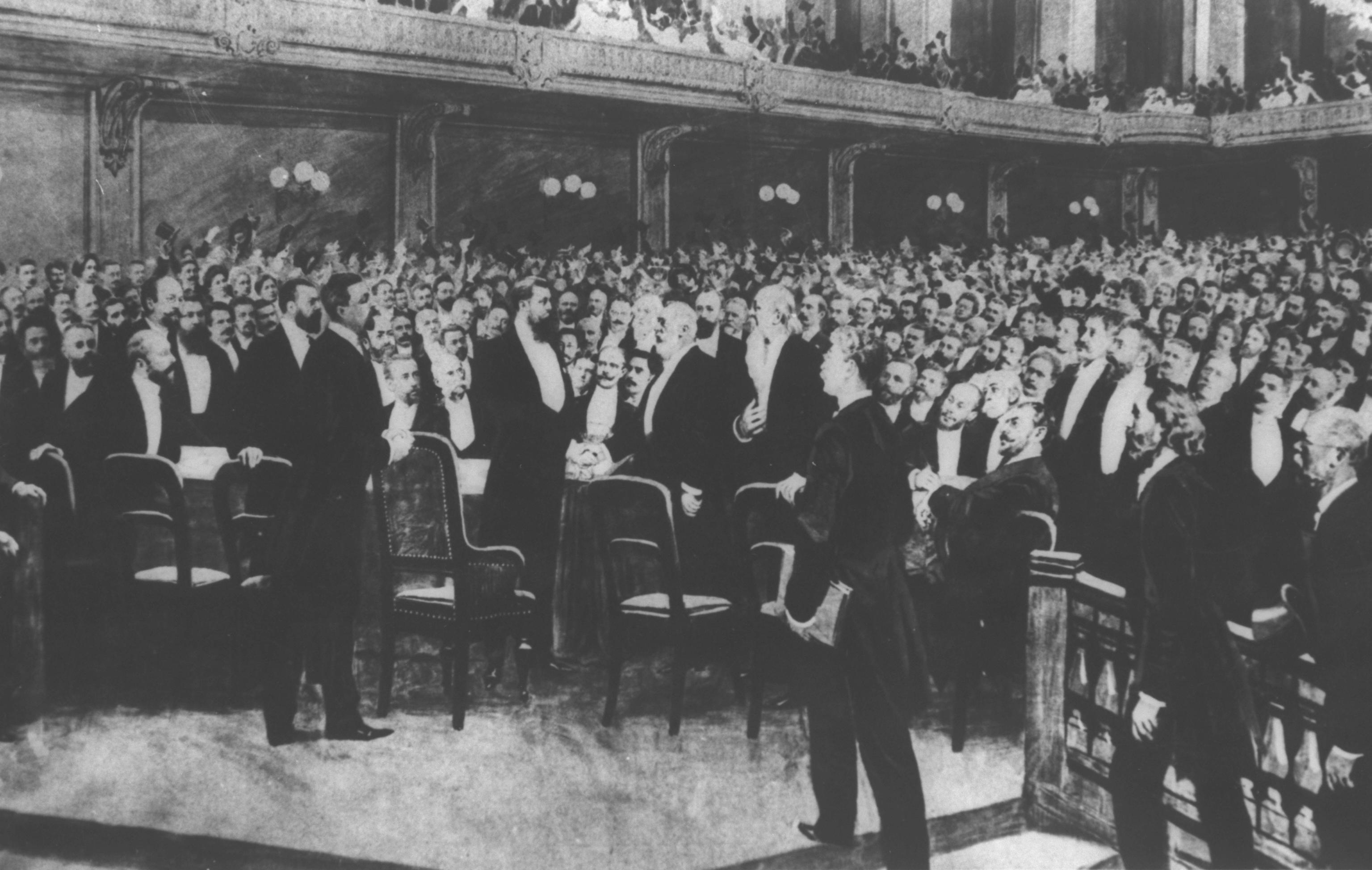
Composite rendering of the interior as it may have appeared in 1897 during the First Zionist Congress; this uses the current (i.e. 1939) interior.

The founding members first met, in hired premises on Reinacherhof, in 1808; eventually the society required its own building, and from 1820 the architect Melchior Berri worked on plans. The Stadtcasino-Gesellschaft was officially established in 1824, and the original building at Steinenberg was completed in 1826.

Notable events held in the original building include the First Zionist Congress in 1897. Up until the establishment of the State of Israel in 1948, the Congress was held a total of ten times in the Steinenberg premises, more than in any other city or venue in the world.

In the late 1930s, because of financial difficulty, the original building was sold, and a new building was erected.

From 2000 there was a project to build a new Stadtcasino. Although an international competition was held for architects, and a winning project by Zaha Hadid was announced, the voters of the canton of Basel-Stadt refused permission in 2007 to proceed with the new building. It was proposed to make structural alterations and extensions to the existing building. The modifications, based on a study by architects Herzog & de Meuron, were carried out from 2016, and in 2020 the Stadtcasino Basel was officially reopened.
