= Leo Motzkin =

Russian Zionist leader

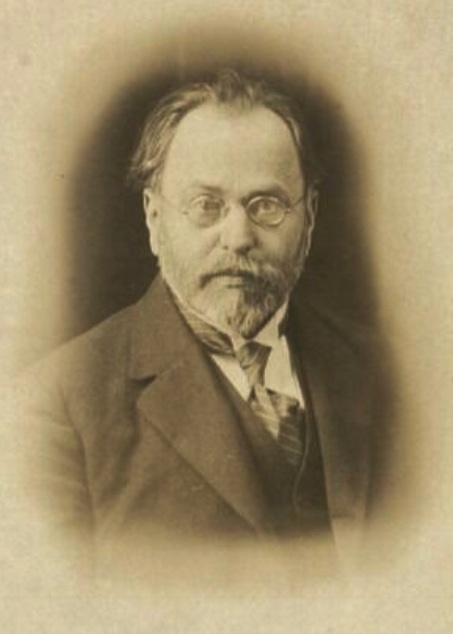
- Leo Motzkin, early 1920s
- Born: Aryeh Leib Motzkin; December 6, 1867; Brovary, Russian Empire
- Died: November 7, 1933 (aged 65); Paris, France
- Other name: Leo Motzkin
- Occupations: President of the World Zionist Congress, Leader of the International Congress of National Minorities
- Known for: Important Zionist Leader

Signature
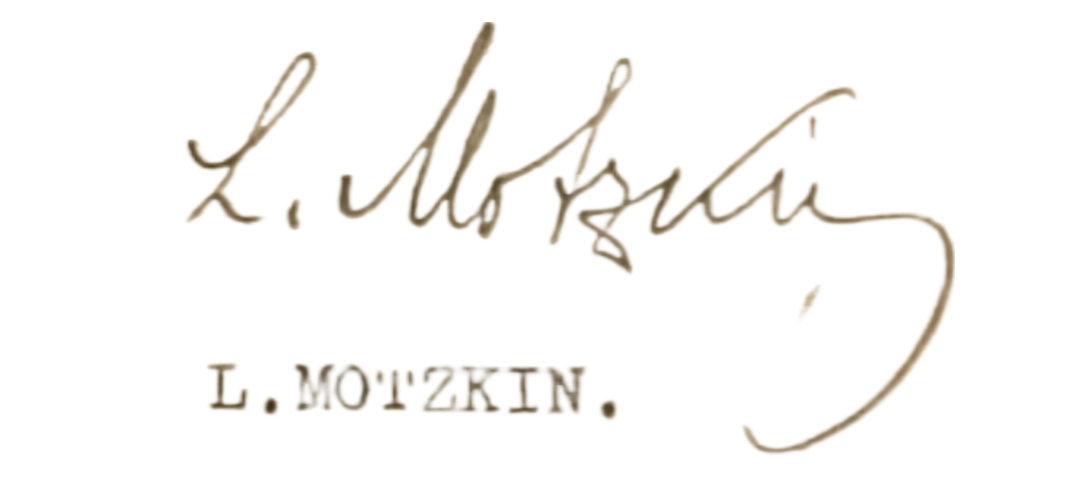

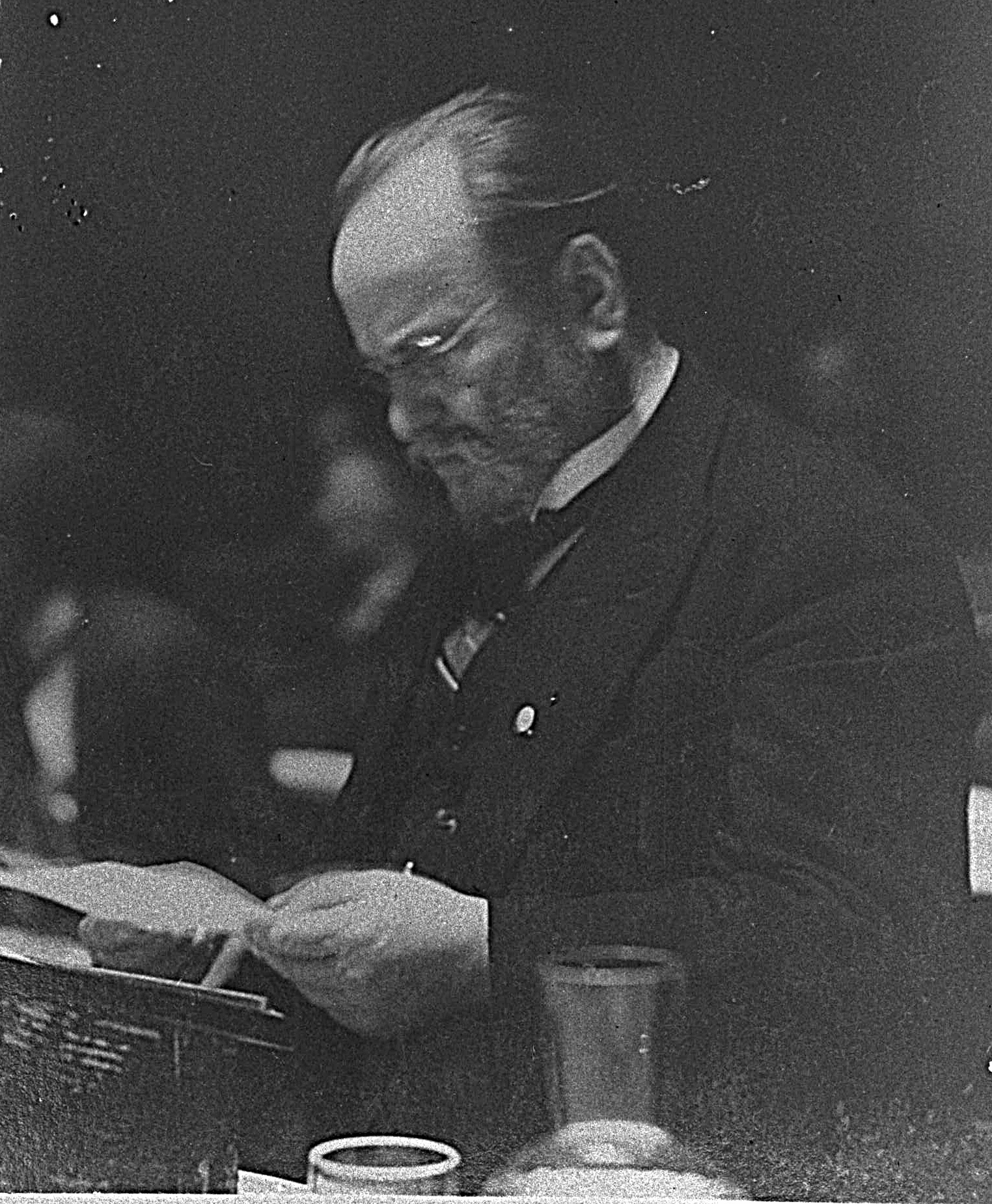
Motzkin at the World Zionist Congress

Leo Motzkin (also Mozkin; 1867 – 7 November 1933) was a Russian Zionist leader. A leader of the World Zionist Congress and numerous Jewish and Zionist organizations, Motzkin was a key organizer of the Jewish delegation to the 1919 Paris Peace Conference and one of the first Jewish leaders to organize opposition to the Nazi Party in Germany.

== Biography ==
Leo Motzkin was born in the town of Brovary, near the city of Kyiv in Ukraine, then a part of the Russian Empire. He was raised and educated according to the culture and traditions of the Jewish community. Motzkin had witnessed the 1881 anti-Jewish pogrom in Kyiv but escaped to Berlin, the capital of Germany. He was accepted into the University of Berlin at the age of 16, after graduating from high school. Studying Sociology and Mathematics, Motzkin continued to pursue doctoral studies. At the university, Motzkin helped found the Russian Jewish Academic Association in 1887 and soon became a full-fledged activist in the Zionist movement.

== Zionist activism ==
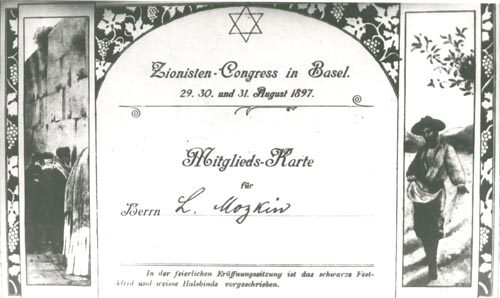
Participant card for Leo Motzkin from the First Zionist Congress, Basel 1897

Motzkin participated in the First Zionist Congress in 1897 and became close to the Zionist leader Theodor Herzl, who sent him on a mission to Palestine to investigate the problems of the Jewish community; contrary to other leaders such as Baron Rothschild and Hovevei Zion, Motzkin favored co-operation with the Ottoman Empire for Jewish interests. Motzkin represented the "Democratic Faction" at the Fifth Congress in 1901. Throughout his life, Motzkin was active in leading numerous Zionist committees. Motzkin endorsed the February Revolution in Russia, which he saw as aiding the liberation of the Jews of Russia.

In 1902, together with Martin Buber and Berthold Feiwel, Motzkin founded Berlin's Jüdischer Verlag (Jewish Publishing House). In 1905, Motzkin published "The Russian Correspondence" anonymously. Most of his attention was devoted to the Jewish problem and Anti-Semitism. In 1909, the Zionist Organization commissioned Motzkin to write a book about the pogroms in Russia, where he described the history of anti-Jewish violence and emphasized the importance of "Jewish Self-Defense" efforts to protect themselves against continuing violence and pogroms. He organized an information service and a campaign against blood libels. During World War I, Motzkin presided over the Copenhagen office of the Zionist organization and worked as liaison between the Zionist organizations in the countries at war. Leo Motzkin also traveled to the United States to collect funds for Jewish refugees and lobby for the protection of Russian Jews. In August 1914, Motzkin joined Franz Oppenheimer and Adolf Friedemann to create a German Committee for Freeing of Russian Jews, which the German Foreign Ministry supported. Motzkin proceeded to establish a Jewish delegation to the Paris Peace Conference in 1919 to represent the interests of Jews across Europe and lobbied for the creation of a World Jewish Congress to represent Jewish minorities worldwide (the organization was later made a permanent institution under the League of Nations). He was a co-founder together with Paul Schiemann of the National Minorities Congress (European Nationalities Congress) in 1925.

Motzkin was an early and leading opponent of the Nazi Party, organizing opposition to it and lobbying the League of Nations to ensure the safety of the German Jewish population.

== Death and commemoration ==
Motzkin died in 1933 in Paris while working for the cause of German Jews. He was re-interred in the Mount of Olives Cemetery in Jerusalem in 1934. In 1939, the "Motzkin Book", a selection of his writings and speeches, was published posthumously. He was the father of noted mathematician Theodore Motzkin.

Kiryat Motzkin (founded in 1934) is named after Leo Motzkin.
