= Jacques Bahar =

Algerian-French thinker

Jacques Bahar (יעקב בכר) was a lawyer, journalist, writer, poet and a Zionist and socialist thinker. He was a French Jew of Algerian origin and represented (together with Edouard Attali and Dr. Eugene Valensin) the Jews of North Africa in the first Zionist Congress, in which he was elected as representative of the Young Zionist Movement to the East.

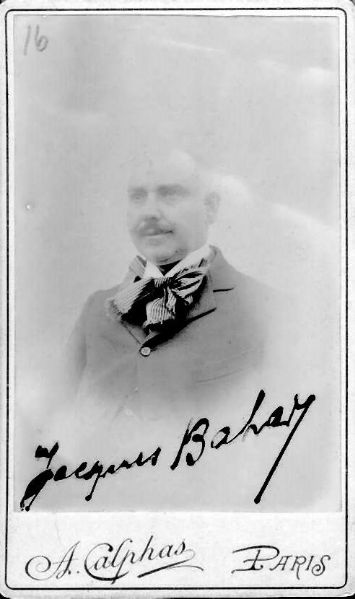
Jacques Bahar

== Biography ==
Bachar published the Zionist-Socialist newspaper "Le Flambeau" in France together with his friend Bernard Lazare.

He has published many articles and books dealing with Jewish and Zionist issues, including a number of utopian works in which he published his vision of the future Jewish state he envisioned to be established in Eretz Israel, including "Anti-goyisme à Sion" and "traitor" (Le Traitre, 1898). His essay "Anti-Goyot in Zion" was later translated into Hebrew and published as part of the anthology of "The Vision of the State" edited by Getzel Kressel. The essay was written in light of the events of the Dreyfus Affair in France and simulates parallel events taking place in the Jewish state established in Zion. The story tells the story of a racist movement that espouses anti-Semitism and seeks to expel foreign citizens from the state. However, public opinion and the legal authorities in the Jewish state did not tolerate this behavior, and the leader of the movement was tried before the Sanhedrin in Jerusalem. The story of the work focuses on the history of the trial, and the exposure of the lies and manipulations of the xenophobes.

== Books ==
- Yaakov Bachar, "Anti-Goyot in Zion", in: Hazioni Medina, edited by Getzel Kressel, Tel Aviv: M. Newman, 1954.
- Yaakov Bachar, There is nothing new under the sun, the deer, August 26, 1898
- Jacques Bahar, Le Traitre, Paris, 1898. (Book, in the Internet Archive )
