= Moshe Klughaft =

- משה קלוגהפט
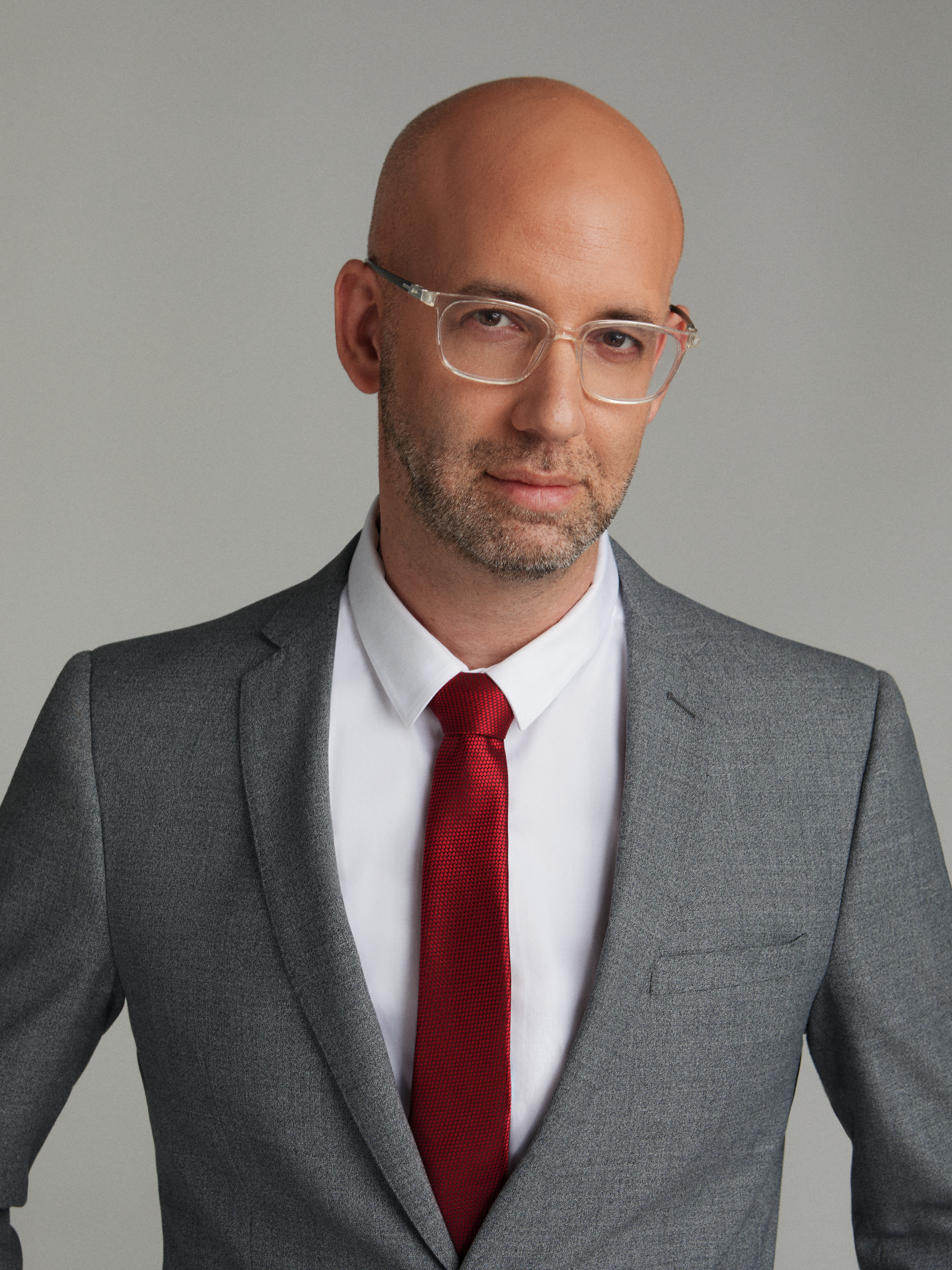
- Born: June 8, 1980 (age 45)
- Occupations: Political strategic advisor, songwriter
- Website: https://www.klughaft.com/about

Moshe Klughaft (Hebrew: משה קלוגהפט; born 8 June 1980) is an Israeli campaign manager, strategic advisor, songwriter and filmmaker. He has managed campaigns for global leaders and was named by the Jerusalem Post as one of the 50 most influential Jews in the world.

== Biography ==
Moshe Klughaft was born in Bat Yam, the third child of Chaya, a mathematics teacher, and Meir, an artillery battalion commander. After completing his military service, he studied advertising and concurrently obtained a bachelor's degree in political science and communication from Bar-Ilan University.

During his studies, Klughaft established a program for Bar Mitzvah preparation geared for non-religious Jews. He also created "Puzzleland," an online marketing site for puzzles.

In 2005-2006, Klughaft served as spokesman for the National Union of Israeli Students and helped to organize student protests over tuition fees.

Since 2022, he has been a regular commentator on the "Pgosh Et Ha'Itonut" (Meet the Press) program on Channel 12 News.

== Consultancy career ==
Klughaft was the political advisor of Pnina Rosenblum when she ran in the Likud primaries. Since 2006, he has been a Knesset media advisor, working for various political figures, among them Israel Hasson and Ronit Tirosh. In 2006, Klughaft served as the media advisor for the protests organized by the reservists after the Second Lebanon War.

In 2011, he was the spokesman for the Knesset's Economic Committee.

In November 2012, Klughaft managed Naftali Bennett's campaign for the leadership of the Jewish Home in which he defeated Zevulun Orlev. Later, he managed the Jewish Home's campaign in the 19th Knesset elections, in which the party won 12 seats, the most it had won since 1977. Klughaft was involved in the preliminary elections in which Bennett was re-elected as the movement's leader, and in the 20th Knesset elections where the strength of Jewish Home declined. Klughaft continued as Bennett's strategic advisor in the coalition negotiations.

Shimon Peres hired Klughaft to manage his campaign to boost the study of mathematics and promote Israeli cybersecurity excellence.

In January 2016-July 2017, Klughaft served as a strategic advisor to the Chancellor of Austria, Christian Kern.

In September 2016, he was appointed one of the strategic advisors in the campaign of the Social Democratic Party in the Romanian parliamentary elections. The party increased its power to about 45% of the seats in parliament. Klughaft also advised the Liberal Party of Kosovo.

Behind the scenes, he advised Tamar Zandberg in her bid for the leadership of Meretz in 2018.

In the 2018 Bat Yam municipal elections, Klughaft advised Tzvika Brot, who defeated the incumbent mayor, Yossi Bachar.

Klughaft advised Salome Zourabichvili, who won the Georgian presidential elections in November 2018.

In 2019–2020, he advised Prime Minister Benjamin Netanyahu.

In July 2021, Prime Minister Naftali Bennett hired him as his strategic advisor. In October 2021, he led the victory of the "Georgian Dream" party in the Georgian referendum, and was the strategic advisor of the former footballer Kakha Kaladze in his victory in the Tbilisi mayoral elections.

Klughaft served as a consultant to the Ministry of Public Security and the Israel Police in their creation of a program to protect children online.

== Filmmaking career ==
In August 2015, Klughaft produced Aviv Geffen's film "New World," addressing the dangers to children on the internet.

Klughaft co-wrote the screenplay for a political thriller drama series "Shadow Government" with Chaim Avihail and Raz Yoven. The series was aired on HOT in 2018.

== Songwriting career ==
Klughaft has written the lyrics for many songs, some of them sung at public ceremonies. "A Child's Smile" was written in memory of his brother Shmulik who died during his IDF service. The song was set to music by Yoni Roeh and performed by Ishay Lapidot and Haim Israel. "I Became a Captive" was performed during the Second Lebanon War. "We Deserve More" was performed by Gilad Segev and Reut Hasson at a rally calling for Ehud Olmert's resignation. "Lullaby" was written in 2010 after the Gaza flotilla raid. It was also performed in 2011 by Ninet Tayeb at the Israel Independence Day torch-lighting ceremony. "Shake Off," performed by Amir Benayoun, was written in 2011 after the murder of the Fogel family. "Sing, Girl" was featured in an album by Yishai Levi released in 2012. In July 2015, on the tenth anniversary of the disengagement, "My Home Goes with Me" was performed by David D'Or.

In 2018, Miri Mesika, Amir Benayoun and David D'Or sang "The Last One Left" in Hebrew, English and Arabic at the United Nations in New York on International Holocaust Remembrance Day. The song was performed again in 2020 in the presence of dozens of world leaders.

In 2019, Klughaft's song "Countdown" was performed by Amir Benayoun and Ishay Ribo.

Ahead of Holocaust Remembrance Day 2019, Klughaft initiated the Eternal Name project to revive songs from the Jewish ghettos. Aviv Geffen, Ninet Tayeb, Mosh Ben-Ari were among the singers who took part in the project. The song "My Mother", which he wrote for Noa Kirel, is based on the writings of a mother during the Holocaust.

In April 2020, Klughaft wrote "Releasing Dreams" for Shuli Rand. In February 2021, he wrote "Lift Your Eyes," performed by the Shalva Band which was dedicated to improving the welfare of people with disabilities. He also wrote "Hold Strong" performed by Arkadi Duchin. In 2021, his songs "And If We Go" and "Childhood Memories" were sung by Rivka Zohar on her 11th album "Listening to the Heart."

In 2022, Klughaft was among the initiators of the "Third Soundtrack" project to commemorate the Holocaust through music. On this occasion, he co-wrote "My Child," with Harel Skaat, Sivan Talmor and Guy Mezig.

== Awards and recognition ==
In 2008, Klughaft was named by Forbes magazine as Israel's second most influential media advisor (after the Prime Minister's advisor) and one of the 100 most influential young Israelis.

In December 2013, he was chosen as the most promising political manager in Israel by the newspaper "Globes."

Klughaft was ranked by the "Jerusalem Post" among the 50 most influential Jews in the world for 2020.

== Personal life ==
Klughaft is married to Sharon, an architect, and the couple has three children.
