= Karpel Lippe =

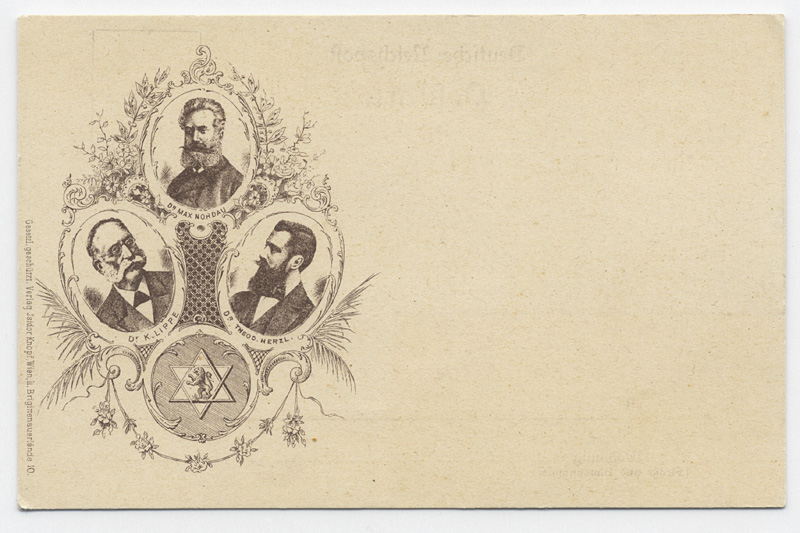
Postcard showing Max Nordau, Theodor Herzl and Karpel Lippe. Jewish Museum of Switzerland.

Karpel Lippe (1830–1915) was a Jewish physician in the Romanian city of Iași and a lifelong Zionist. He participated in the First Zionist Congress as its president.

== Biography ==
Karpel Lippe was a member of Hovevei Zion, a Zionist society with branches all over Europe. He joined the organization in 1882 and participated in the Katowice Conference in 1884. He held the presidency at the First Zionist Congress in Basel, where he delivered the opening speech. Lippe spent the last years of his life in Przemyśl from 1911 and in Vienna in 1914, where he died a year later.

== Published works ==
- The love of humanity, civilization, and justice, viewed from the standpoint of the most recent events in Tissa-Esslar, Pressburg, 1883 [Vienna: Pollák]
- The Talmudjude before the Catholic-Protestant-Orthodox Dreirichter-Kollegium Rohling - Stöcker - Pobedonoscew, Pressburg: Löwy & Alkalay / Commissions Publishing House by D. Löwy's bookstore Vienna 1884.
- The law collection of the Jewish mirror, compiled and falsified by Aron Briman pseudodoctor Justus; Illuminated and corrected by K. Lippe, Iași, book and engraving H. Goldner 1885.
- Symptoms of antisemitic mental disease, Iași: H. Goldner 1887.
- Rabbinical scientific lectures, Drohobycz 1897 [Vienna: Ch. D. Lippe]
- The Gospel of Matthew before the Forum of the Bible and the Talmud, Iași: Printing and Publishing by Jsidor Schorr 1889
- The ten commandments in the sense of Judaism and the Church of Dr. med. K. Lippe, Iași: H. Goldner, 1901
- Two lectures on immortality and spiritualism held at BB Loge Neo-Samuel-Jassy by her Honorary President Dr. K. Lippe, eds. from the Loge to the memory of his double jubilee: the golden diploma (March 13) and the golden wedding (June 5, 1907), Iași: H. Goldner 1907
- The forensic medicine in the Biblical Mohammedan legislation. Lecture . Editor: The Comité of the Romanian-Zionist Federation in Galatz-Braila, to the 80th birthday of the author, Iași: Abermann 1910
- Collection of selected essays from the writings. Dedicated to the Grand Lodge Synhedrin of the Order Bne-Berith Section Zion in Bucharest, Berlin: C. Boas Nachf. 1915
