= First Zionist Congress =

1897 event in Basel, Switzerland

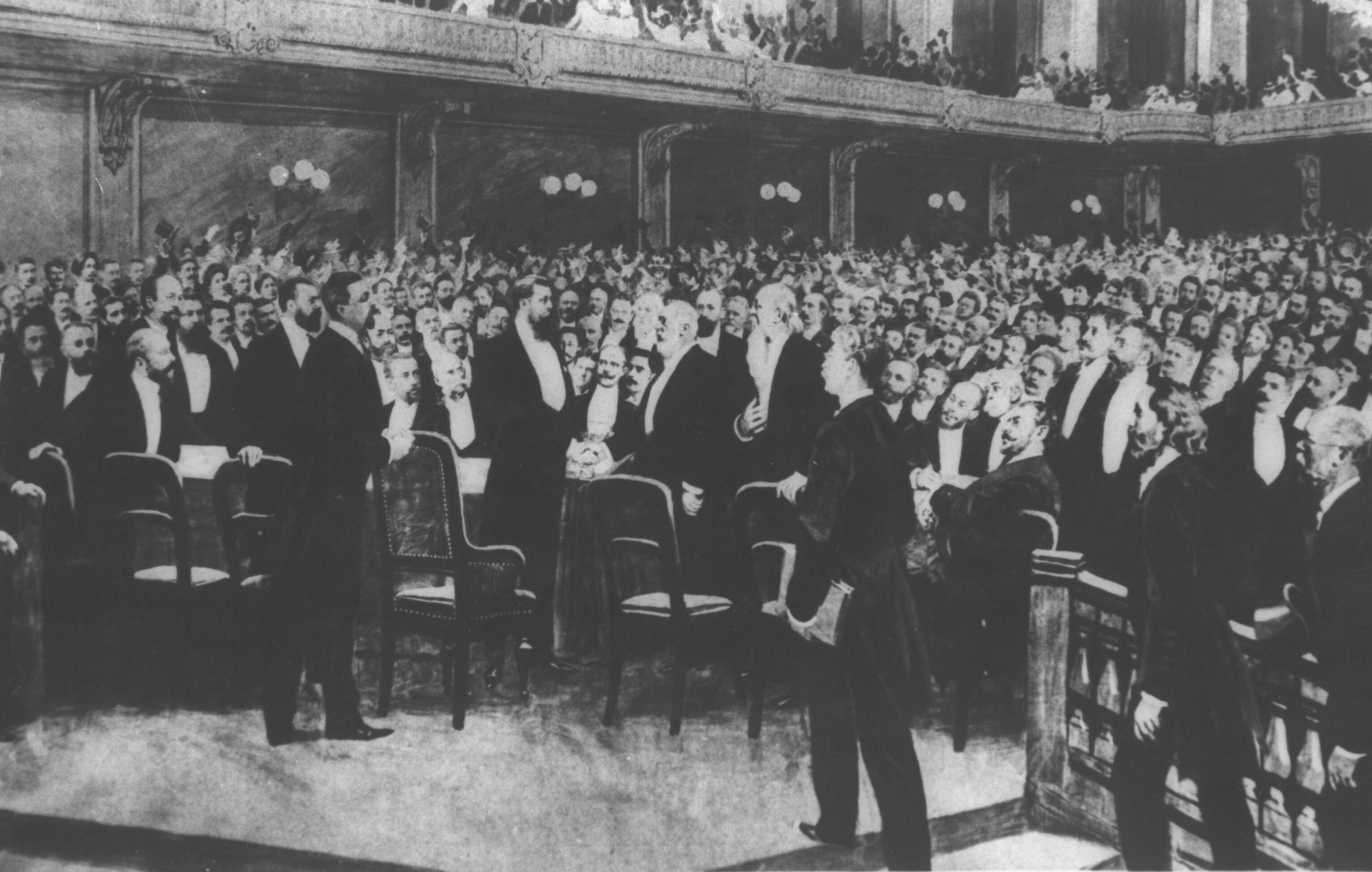
- Delegates at the First Zionist Congress in Basel, 1897
- Genre: Zionist Congress
- Date: August 29–31, 1897
- Venue: Stadtcasino Basel
- Locations: Basel, Switzerland
- Next event: Second Zionist Congress
- Participants: 208 delegates from 17 countries
- Organiser: Theodor Herzl
- Outcome: Adoption of the Basel Program and creation of the Zionist Organization

The First Zionist Congress was the inaugural congress of the Zionist Organization (ZO) held in the Stadtcasino Basel in the city of Basel on August 29–31, 1897. Two hundred and eight delegates from 17 countries and 26 press correspondents attended the event. It was convened and chaired by Theodor Herzl, the founder of the modern Zionism movement. The Congress formulated a Zionist platform, known as the Basel Program, and founded the Zionist Organization.

The conference was covered by the international press, making a significant impression.

== History ==
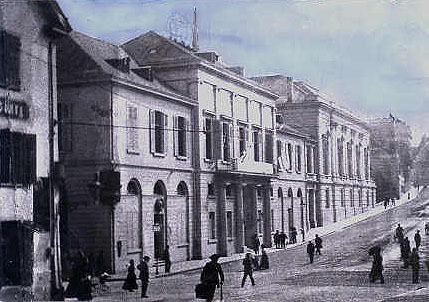
Stadtcasino Basel where the Congress took place

The first Zionist Congress was convened by Theodor Herzl as a symbolic parliament for the small minority of Jewry in agreement with the implementation of Zionist goals. While Jewish majority indifference or opposition to Zionism would continue until after revelation of the Holocaust in World War II, some proponents point to several directions and streams of this early Jewish opposition. "Alongside the dynamic development of the Zionist movement, which generated waves of enthusiasm throughout the Jewish public, sharp criticism began to appear about Zionism, claiming that Zionism could not hope to resolve the Jewish problem and would only serve to harm the status of Jewish laborers and sabotage its own recognition as an independent class." As a result of the vocal opposition by both the Orthodox and Reform community leadership, the Congress, which was originally planned in Munich, Germany, was transferred to Basel by Herzl. The Congress took place in the concert hall of the Stadtcasino Basel on August 29, 1897. Proceedings were conducted in German.

== Delegates ==
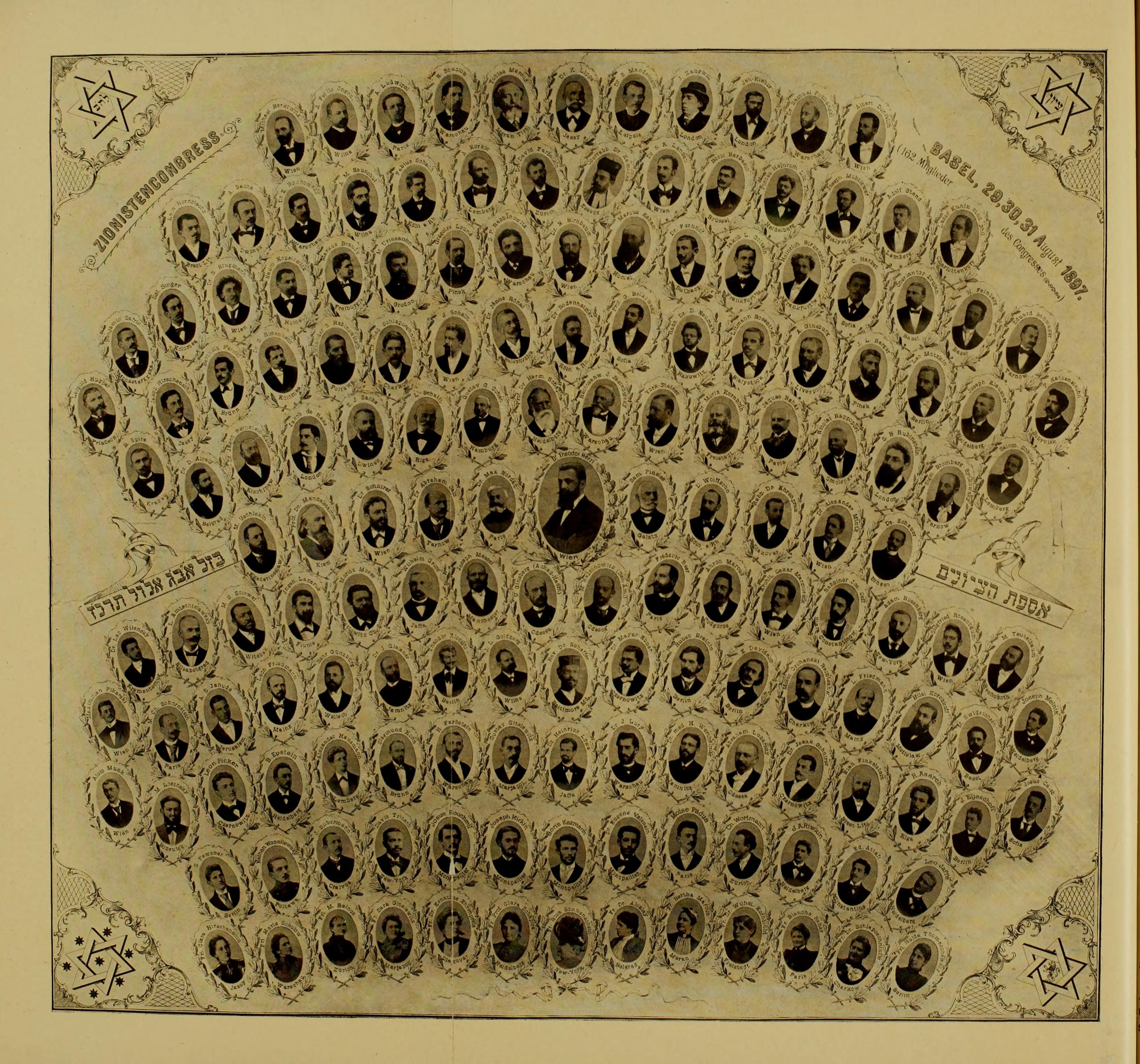
First Zionist Congress delegates

Herzl acted as chairperson of the Congress, which was attended by 208 participants from seventeen countries, 69 of whom were delegates from various Zionist societies, and the remainder were individual invitees. Seventeen women attended the Congress, some of them in their own capacity, others accompanying representatives. While women participated in the First Zionist Congress, they did not have voting rights; they were accorded full membership rights at the Second Zionist Congress, the following year.

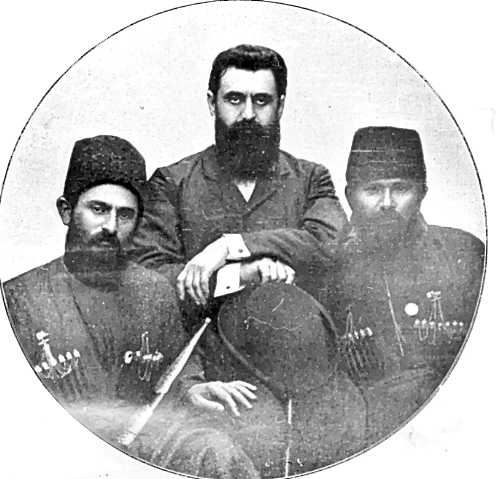
Mountain Jewish delegates with Herzl at the First Zionist Congress

Over half the delegates were from Eastern Europe, with nearly a quarter coming from Russia.

Herzl was elected President of the Congress, with Max Nordau, Abraham Salz and Samuel Pineles elected first, second and third Vice Presidents respectively.

== Agenda ==
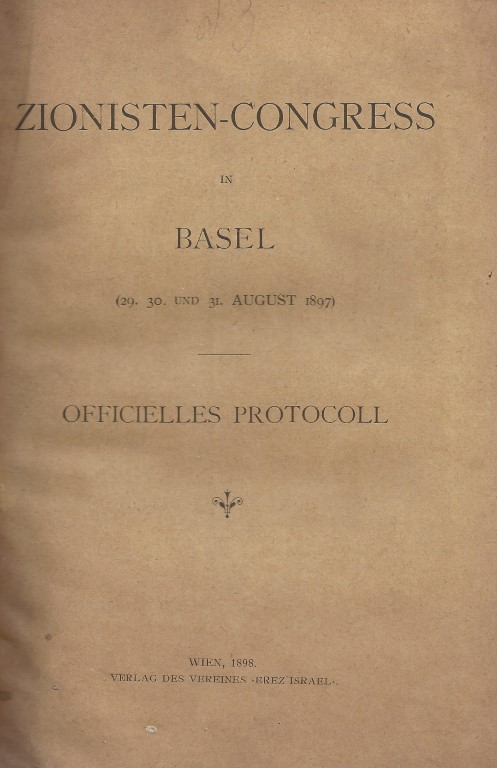
Zionist-Congress in Basel (29-31 August 1897) Official Protocol. Vienna: Verlag des Vereines "Erez Israel", 1898.

Following a festive opening in which the representatives arrived in formal dress (white tie), the Congress moved to the agenda. The principal items on the agenda were the presentation of Herzl's plans, the establishment of the Zionist Organization and the declaration of Zionism's goals—the Basel program.

According to the 200-page Official Protocol, the three-day conference included the following events:

=== Day 1: Sunday 29 August ===
1. Karpel Lippe, Jassy delegate, opening speech
2. Theodor Herzl, speech
3. Max Nordau, Paris delegate, speech
4. Abraham Salz, speech
5. Jacob de Haas, speech
6. Jacques Bahar, speech
7. Samuel Pineles, Galați delegate, speech
8. Alexander Mintz, Vienna delegate, speech
9. Mayer Ebner, speech
10. Dr. Rudolf Schauer, Bingen am Rhein delegate, speech
11. Professor Gregor Belkovsky, Sofia delegate, speech
12. János Rónai, Blaj delegate, speech
13. Adam Rosenberg, New York delegate, speech
14. Nathan Birnbaum, Vienna delegate, speech
15. David Farbstein, Zurich delegate, speech

=== Day 2: Monday 30 August ===
1. The President, and moderated discussion
2. Dr. Max Bodenheimer, Cologne delegate, speech
3. Group discussion
4. Jacob Bernstein-Kohan, speech
5. M. Moses, speech

=== Day 3: Tuesday 31 August ===
1. Dr. Kaminka, speech
2. Adam Rosenberg, speech
3. Mordecai Ehrenpreis, speech
4. Group discussion

== First Zionist Executive ==
The Zionist Executive elected by the First Congress consisted of:

- Vienna (5): Theodor Herzl, Moses Schnirer, Oser Kokesch, Johann Kremenezky and Alexander Mintz (the latter in place of Nathan Birmbaum)
- Austria (other than Galicia and Bukovina) (1): Dr. Sigmund Kornfeld
- Galicia (2): Abraham Salz, Abraham Adolf Korkis
- Bukovina (1): Mayer Ebner
- Russia (4): Rabbi Samuel Mohilever, Prof. Max E. Mandelstamm, Jacob Bernstein-Kohan, Isidor Jasinowski
- France (2): Bernard Lazare, Jacques Bahar
- Romania (2): Karl Lippe, Samuel Pineles
- Bulgaria and Serbia (1): Prof. Gregor Belkovsky
- Germany (2): Rabbi Isaac Rülf, Max Bodenheimer

In addition, it was agreed that one representative was to be appointed for each of Britain, America and Palestine. This was proposed to take place later at publicly convened assemblies.

== Basel Program ==
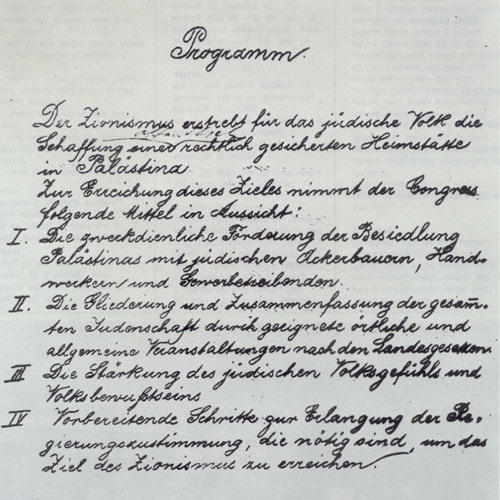
"Basel Program"

On the second day of its deliberations (August 30), the version submitted to the Congress by a committee under the chair of Max Nordau, it was stated: "Zionism seeks to establish a home for the Jewish people in Palestine secured under public law." This gave clear expression to Herzl's political Zionist vision, in contrast with the settlement orientated activities of the more loosely organized Hovevei Zion. To meet halfway the request of numerous delegates, the most prominent of whom was Leo Motzkin, who sought the inclusion of the phrase "by international law," a compromise formula proposed by Herzl was eventually adopted.

The program, which came to be known as the Basel Program, set out the goals of the Zionist movement. It was adopted on the following terms:

Zionism seeks to establish a home in Palestine for the Jewish people, secured under public law.

To achieve this goal, the Congress envisages the following means:

1. The expedient promotion of the settlement of Jewish agriculturists, artisans, and tradesmen in Palestine.
2. The organization and bringing together of all Jews through local and general events, according to the laws of the various countries.
3. The strengthening of Jewish feeling and national consciousness.
4. Preparatory steps for obtaining the governmental approval which is necessary to the achievement of the Zionist purpose.

According to Israel Zangwill it was Max Nordau who came up with the phrase "home secured by public law" to avoid antagonising the Sultan "too deeply".

== Results ==
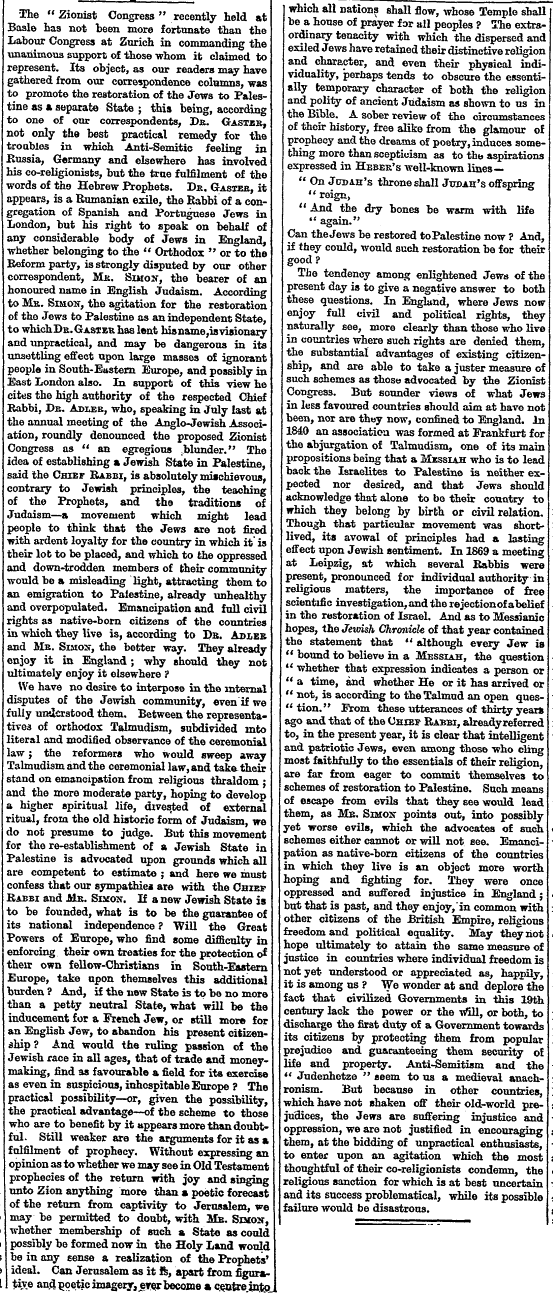
Editorial summarizing reactions by The Times' many correspondents, Sep 4, 1897, four days after the close of the congress.

The First Zionist Congress resulted in the following:

- The formulation of the Zionist platform, (the Basel program, above)
- The foundation of the Zionist Organization
- The absorption of most of the previous Hovevei Zion societies
- The suggestion for the establishment of a people's bank, and
- The election of Herzl as President of the Zionist Organization and Max Nordau one of three vice-presidents.

Theodor Herzl wrote in his diary (September 3, 1897):

Were I to sum up the Basel Congress in a word - which I shall guard against pronouncing publicly - it would be this: At Basel I founded the Jewish State. If I said this out loud today l would be greeted by universal laughter. In five years perhaps, and certainly in fifty years, everyone will perceive it.

— Theodor Herzl (1897)

Subsequent congresses founded various institutions for the promotion of this program, notably a people's bank known as the Jewish Colonial Trust, which was the financial instrument of political Zionism. Its establishment was suggested at the First Zionist Congress in 1897; the first definite steps toward its institution were taken at the Second Zionist Congress in Cologne, Germany in May, 1898. For the Fifth Zionist Congress, the Jewish National Fund was founded for the purchase of land in Palestine and later the Zionist Commission was founded with subsidiary societies for the study and improvement of the social and economic condition of the Jews within the Land of Israel.

The Zionist Commission was an informal group established by Chaim Weizmann. It carried out initial surveys of Palestine and aided the repatriation of Jews sent into exile by the Ottoman Turks during World War I. It expanded the ZO's Palestine Office, which was established in 1907, into small departments for agriculture, settlement, education, land, finance, immigration, and statistics. In 1921, the commission became the Palestine Zionist Executive, which acted as the Jewish Agency, to advise the British mandate authorities on the development of the country in matters of Jewish interest.

The Zionist Congress met every year between 1897 and 1901, then except for war years, every second year (1903–1913, 1921–1939). In 1942, an "Extraordinary Zionist Conference" was held and announced a fundamental departure from traditional Zionist policy with its demand "that Palestine be established as a Jewish Commonwealth." It became the official Zionist stand on the ultimate aim of the movement. Since the Second World War, meetings have been held approximately every four years and since the establishment of the State of Israel, the Congress has been held in Jerusalem.

== Gallery ==
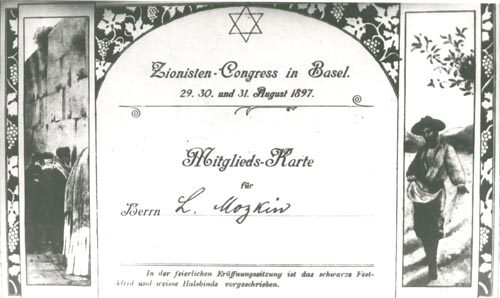
A participant card from the event.

The symbol of the First Congress.

The flag of the First Zionist Congress

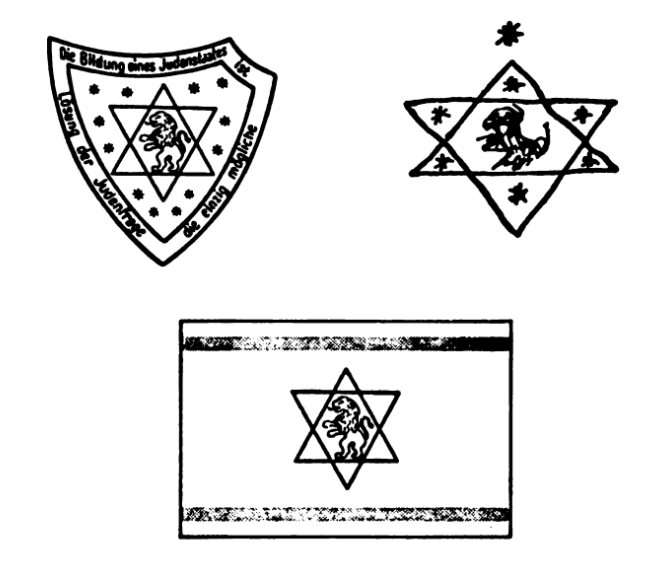
Max Bodenheimer's (top left) and Herzl's (top right) 1897 drafts of the Zionist flag, compared to the final version used at the congress

== See also ==
- Types of Zionism
- World Zionist Congress
- Zionist Organization, renamed World Zionist Organization in 1960
- Zionism
- Star of David

== Bibliography ==
- Jubilee Publication (1947). The Jubilee of the first Zionist Congress, 1897-1947. Jerusalem: Executive of the Zionist Organisation. pp. 108 pages, 2 leaves of platesPublished simultaneously in Hebrew, French, Spanish and Yiddish
- The Jewish Encyclopedia: Basel Program
