= Szcześniak =

Szcześniak or Szczęśniak is a gender-neutral Polish surname. Notable people with the surname include:

- Alina Surmacka Szczesniak (1925–2016), Polish-born, American food scientist
- Andrzej Leszek Szcześniak (1932–2003), Polish historian and educator
- Filip Szcześniak (born 1990), known by stage name Taco Hemingway, Polish rapper, songwriter, and musician
- Maciej Szczęśniak (born 1989), Polish interdisciplinary artist
- Małgorzata Szczęśniak (born 1954), Polish stage and costume designer
- Sławomir Szczęśniak (born 1961), Polish musician, satirist, actor, and journalist
- Rose Hemingway (née Sezniak or Szczesniak; born 1984), American actress, performer and singer
