= League of East European States =

1914 proposal for a European buffer state

The League of East European States or Federation of East European States (German: osteuropäischer Staatenbund) was a 1914 proposal by the German Committee for Freeing of Russian Jews for a German-dominated consociational buffer state to be established in the Russian Partition of the multi-ethnic territory of the former Polish–Lithuanian Commonwealth.

== Bodenheimer plan ==
The idea was conceived by prominent Zionist Max Bodenheimer, in the context of World War I and longstanding German Mitteleuropa ambitions, utilizing the concept of national personal autonomy or national curiae, which would allow Jewish representation in the government alongside other groups despite their Pale of Settlement dispersion. Bodenheimer was a founder of the German Committee for Freeing of Russian Jews. The Committee drew up a plan to establish a buffer state between Germany and Russia, created from territory to be taken from Imperial Russia. The biography by his daughter describes a divide and rule strategy to the benefit of Germany: "In this Federation Ukrainians, White Russians, Lithuanians, Esthonians and Latvians would together serve as a counterbalance to the Poles, and the Germans, and Jews would hold the balance of power between the two groupings."

== German reaction ==
Bodenheimer submitted a Memorandum with the proposal to the German Foreign Office in 1914, where it and the Committee received the support of Erich Ludendorff and then Paul von Hindenburg, as he made the case to them that Eastern European Jewry could be Germanised.

The plan soon proved unpopular with other German officials and Bodenheimer's Zionist colleagues and was dead by the following year. The only tangible result was an August 1914 military propaganda leaflet targeting the Jews of Poland, the final text of which greatly disappointed Bodenheimer. The Poles were not very keen on the plan either.

The idea was criticized by various Zionist leaders as impractical and dangerous, and eventually was given up after Wilhelm II of Germany and Franz Joseph of Austria issued the Act of November 5th 1916 in which they proclaimed the creation of the Kingdom of Poland.

== Conspiracy theory ==
The Bodenheimer plan was cited by the author Andrzej Leszek Szcześniak as an example of "Judeopolonia" in his 2001 book of the same name, echoing the anti-Semitic conspiracy theory positing a future Jewish domination of Poland that arose in the late nineteenth century.

== See also ==
- Judeopolonia
- Mitteleuropa
- Proposals for a Jewish state
