= Żydokomuna =

Anti-communist and antisemitic canard

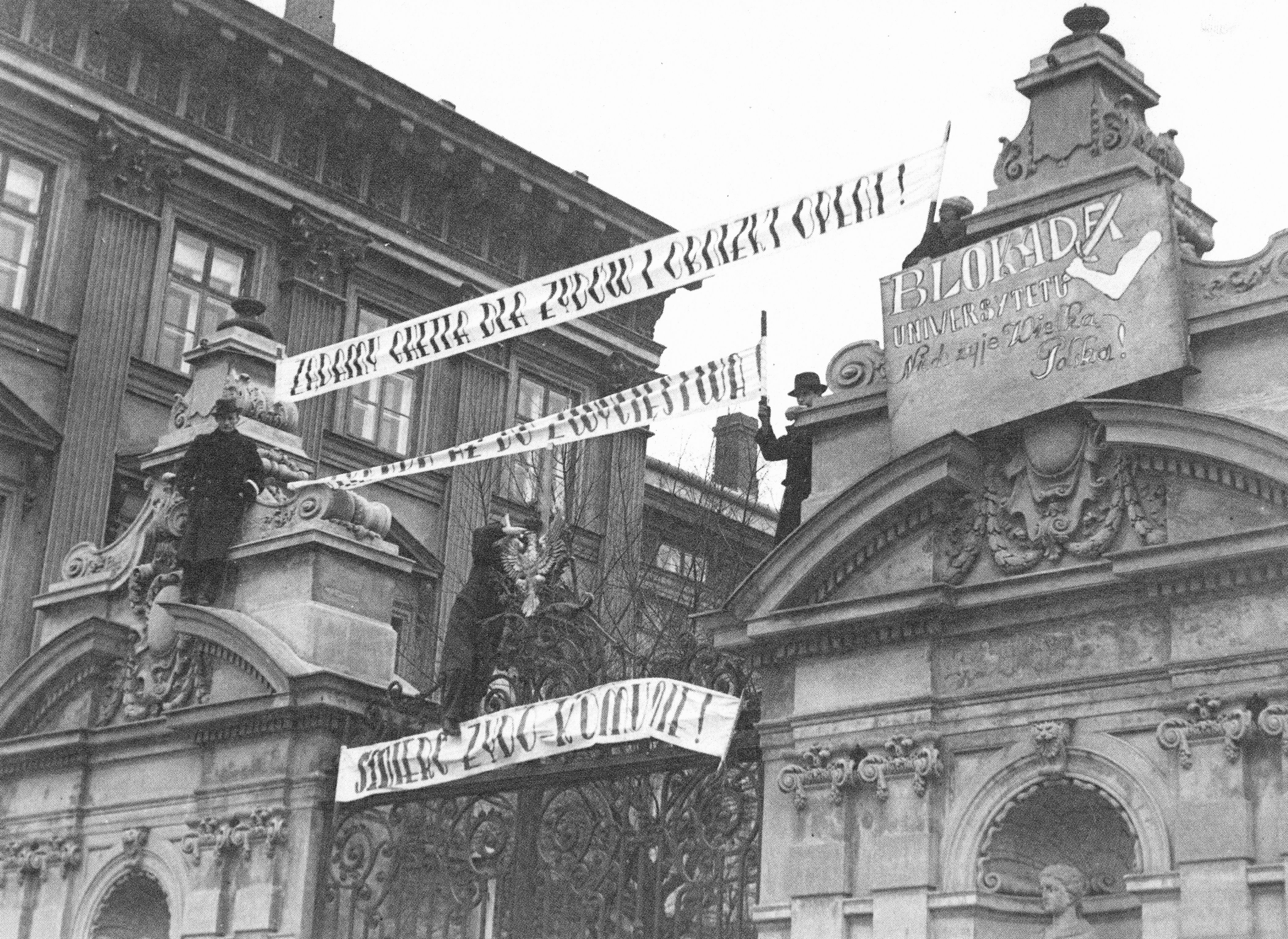
- ONR banners over Warsaw University entrance, 1936. The lower reads "Śmierć żydo-komunie" ("Death to Judeo-Communism"). (Note: This particular event, during which ONR members attempted to prevent Jewish students enrolling at the university, was successfully countered and dispersed by Socialist Action.)
- Origin: Judeopolonia
- Original form: Judeo–Bolshevism
- Context: Polish–Soviet War
- Coined by: Endecja propaganda
- Meaning: An antisemitic trope claiming that communism was a Jewish plot

Żydokomuna ([ʐɨdɔkɔˈmuna], Polish for "Judeo-Communism") is an anti-communist and antisemitic canard, or pejorative stereotype, suggesting that most Jews collaborated with the Soviet Union in importing communism into Poland, or that there was an exclusively Jewish conspiracy to do so. A Polish language term for "Jewish Bolshevism", or more literally "Jewish communism", Żydokomuna is related to the "Jewish world conspiracy" myth.

The idea originated as anti-communist propaganda at the time of the Polish–Soviet War (1919–1920), and continued through the interwar period. It was based on longstanding antisemitic attitudes, coupled with a historical fear of Russia. Most of Poland's Jews supported the government controlled by Józef Piłsudski; after his death in 1935, rising levels of popular and state antisemitism pushed a small minority, several thousand at most, into participating in, or supporting, communist politics, which were relatively more welcoming to Jews. This was seized upon and inflated by antisemites.

With the Soviet invasion of Poland and Stalin's 1939 occupation in eastern Poland, the Soviets used privileges and punishments to encourage ethnic and religious differences between Jews and Poles, characterized by Jan Gross as "the institutionalization of resentment". The stereotype was also reinforced because, as noted by Jaff Schatz, "people of Jewish origin constituted a substantial part of the Polish communist movement", even though "Communist ideals and the movement itself enjoyed only very limited support" among Polish Jews. There was an upsurge in the antisemitic stereotype of Jews as Communist traitors; it erupted into mass murder when Nazi Germany invaded Soviet eastern Poland in the summer of 1941.

The stereotype endured into postwar Poland because Polish anti-communists saw Poland's Soviet-controlled Communist government as the fruition of prewar communist anti-Polish agitation and associated it with the Soviets' appointment of Jews to positions of responsibility in the Polish government. It was also reinforced by the prominent role of a small number of Jews in Poland's Stalinist regime (in particular, Jakub Berman and Hilary Minc). Michael C. Steinlauf noted that Jewish communists, despite their small number, have gained a notorious reputation in Poland, "believed to have masterminded the enslavement [of that country]" and became "demonized" as part of the Żydokomuna canard.

== Background ==
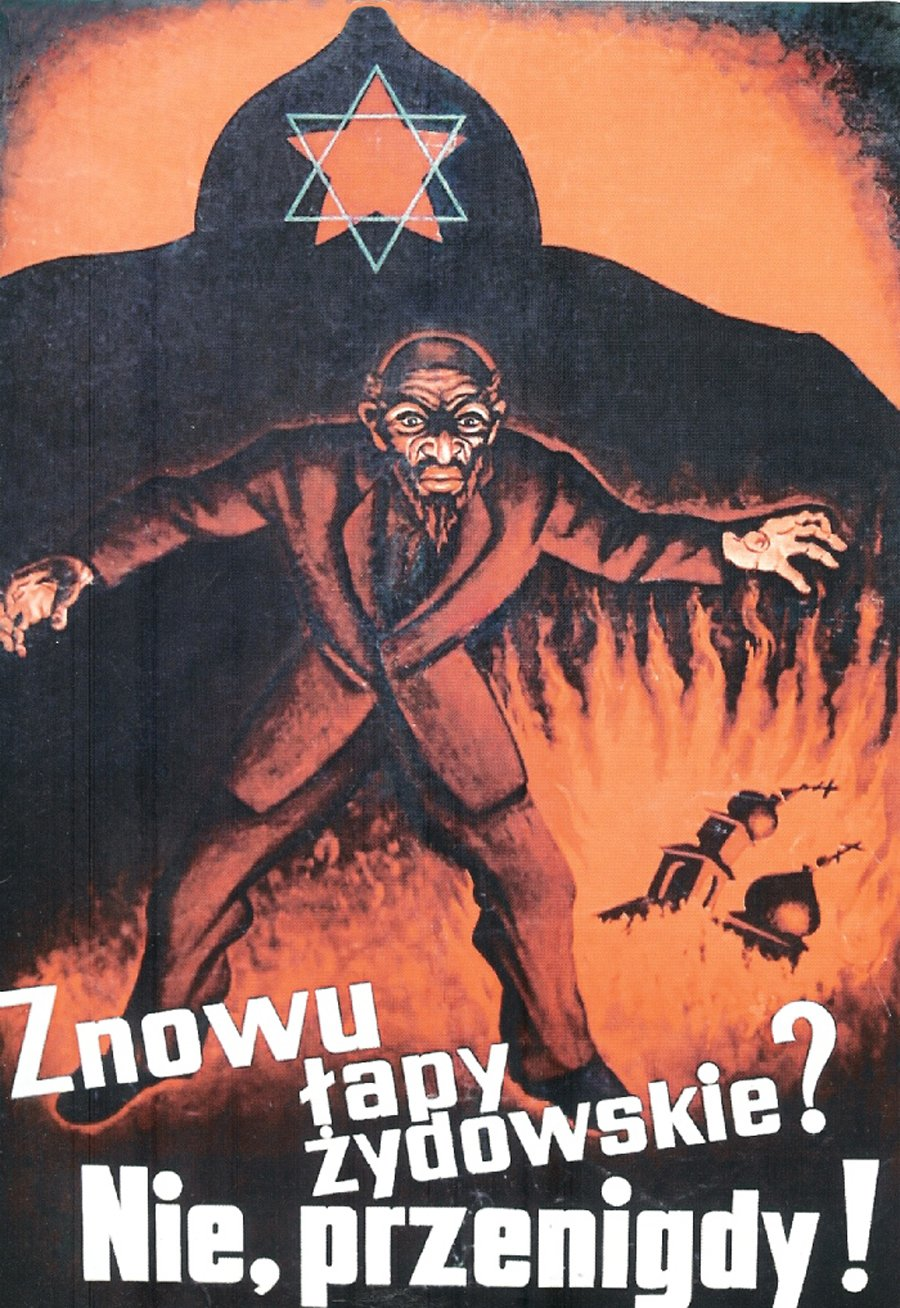
Antisemitic Polish poster from the Polish–Soviet War (1919–1920): "Jewish paws again? No, never!"

The concept of a Jewish conspiracy threatening Polish social order may be found in the pamphlet Rok 3333 czyli sen niesłychany (The Year 3333, or the Incredible Dream) by Polish Enlightenment author and political activist Julian Ursyn Niemcewicz; it was written in 1817 and published posthumously in 1858. Called "the first Polish work to develop on a large scale the concept of an organized Jewish conspiracy directly threatening the existing social structure," it describes a Warsaw of the future renamed Moszkopolis after its Jewish ruler.

At the end of the 19th century, Roman Dmowski's National Democratic party characterized Poland's Jews and other opponents of his party as internal enemies who were behind international conspiracies inimical to Poland and who were agents of disorder, disruption and socialism. Historian Antony Polonsky writes that before World War I, "The National Democrats brought to Poland a new and dangerous ideological fanaticism, dividing society into 'friends' and 'enemies' and resorting constantly to conspiratorial theories ("Jewish-Masonic plot"; "Żydokomuna"—"Jew-communism") to explain Poland's difficulties." Meanwhile, some Jews played into National Democratic rhetoric by their participation in exclusively Jewish organizations, such as the Bund and the Zionist movement, even as other Jews zealously participated in national institutions such as the Polish Army and Józef Piłsudski's ideologically multicultural Sanation regime.

== History ==
=== Origins ===
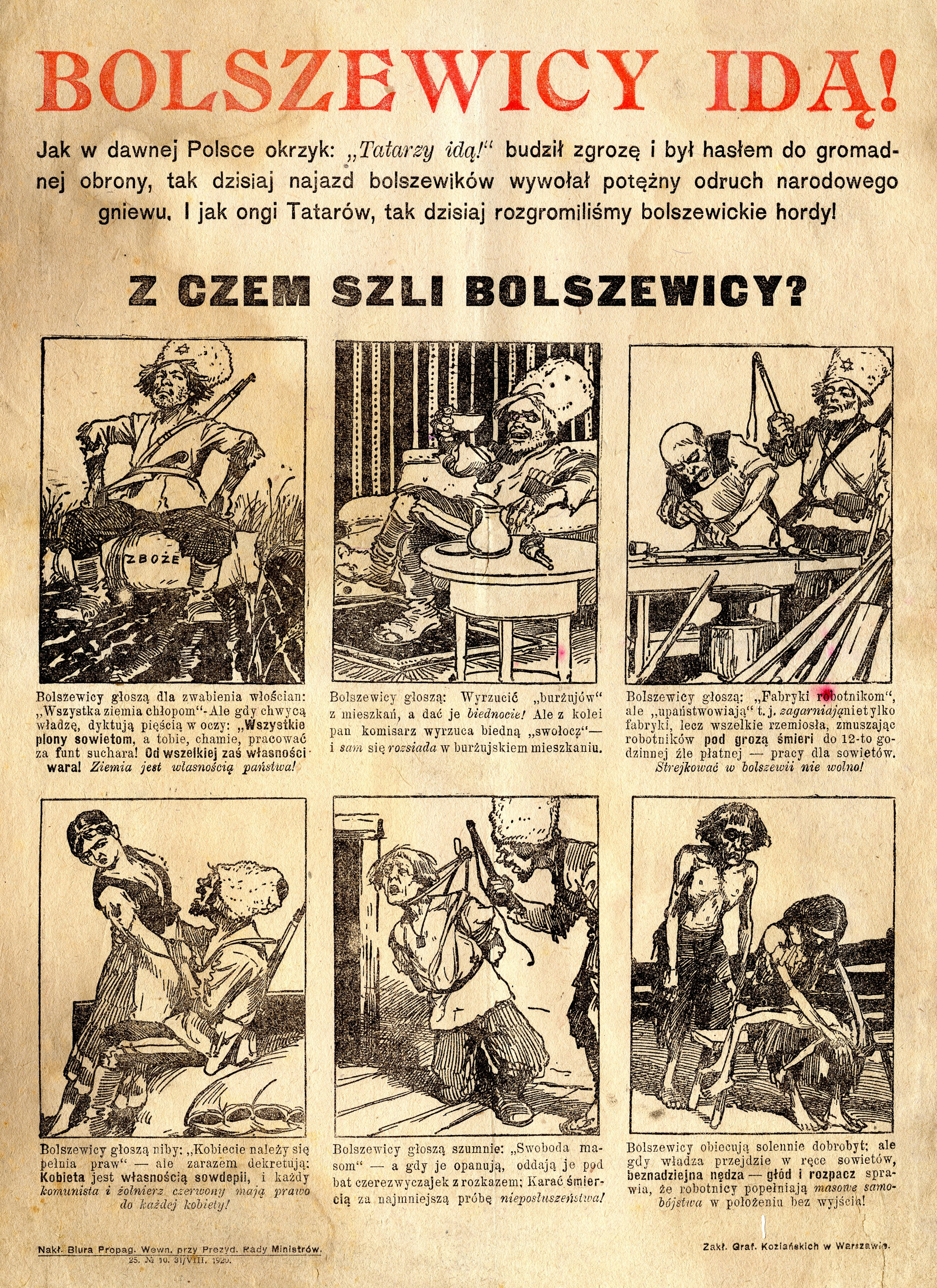
1920 Polish propaganda poster: "The Bolsheviks Are Coming!"

According to Joanna Michlic, "the image of the secularized and radically left-wing Jew who aims to take over [the country] and undermine the foundations of the Christian world" dates to the first half of the 19th century, to the writings of Julian Ursyn Niemcewicz and Zygmunt Krasinski; by the end of the 19th century it had become part of the political discourse in Poland. The phenomenon, described with the term Żydokomuna, originated in connection with the Russian Bolshevik Revolution and targeted Jewish Communists during the Polish–Soviet War. The emergence of the Soviet state was seen by many Poles as Russian imperialism in a new guise. The visibility of Jews in both the Soviet leadership and in the Communist Party of Poland further heightened such fears. In some circles, Żydokomuna came to be seen as a prominent antisemitic stereotype expressing political paranoia.

Accusations of Żydokomuna accompanied the incidents of anti-Jewish violence in Poland during Polish–Soviet War of 1920, legitimized as self-defense against a people who were oppressors of the Polish nation. Some soldiers and officers in the Polish eastern territories shared the conviction that Jews were enemies of the Polish nation-state and were collaborators with Poland's enemies. Some of these troops treated all Jews as Bolsheviks. According to some sources, the anti-Communist sentiment was implicated in anti-Jewish violence and killings in a number of towns, including the Pinsk massacre, in which 35 Jews, taken as hostages, were murdered. During the Lwów pogrom during the Polish–Ukrainian War, 72 Jews were killed. Occasional instances of Jewish support for Bolshevism during the Polish–Soviet War served to heighten anti-Jewish sentiment.

The concept of Żydokomuna was widely illustrated in Polish interwar politics, including publications by the National Democrats and the Catholic Church that expressed anti-Jewish views. During World War II, the term Żydokomuna was made to resemble the Jewish-Bolshevism rhetoric of Nazi Germany, wartime Romania and other war-torn countries of Central and Eastern Europe.

=== Interwar period ===
During the period between the two world wars, the myth of Żydokomuna became intertwined with that of the "criminal Jew". Statistics from the 1920s had indicated a low Jewish crime rate. In 1924, 72 percent of those convicted of crimes were ethnic Poles, 21 percent "Ruthenians/Ukrainians", and 3.4 percent Jews. A reclassification of how crime was recorded, which now included minor offenses, reversed the trend. By the 1930s, Jewish criminal statistics showed an increase relative to the Jewish population. Some Poles, particularly as reported within the right-wing press, believed these statistics confirmed the image of the "criminal Jew"; additionally, political crimes by Jews were more closely scrutinized, enhancing fears of a criminal Żydokomuna.

Another important factor was the dominance of Jews in the leadership of the Communist Party of Poland (KPP). According to multiple sources, Jews were well represented in the KPP. Notably, the party had strong Jewish representation at higher levels. In January 1936 the national composition of the central party authorities were as follows: out of the 19 KC (central committee) KPP members 11 were Polish, 6 were Jewish (31,6%), 1 was Belarusian and 1 Ukrainian. Jews made up 28 out of the 52 individuals of the "district activists" of the KPP (53.8%), 75% of its "publication apparatus", 90% of the "international department for help to revolutionaries", and 100% of the "technical apparatus" of the Home Secretariat. In Polish court proceedings against communists between 1927 and 1936, 90% of the accused were Jews. In terms of membership, before its dissolution in 1938, 25% of KPP members were Jews; most urban KPP members were Jews, which was a substantial number, given an 8.7% Jewish minority in prewar Poland. Some historians, including Joseph Marcus, qualify these statistics, alleging that the KPP should not be considered a "Jewish party", as it was in fact opposed to traditional Jewish economic and national interests. The Jews supporting the KPP identified as international Communists and rejected much of the Jewish culture and tradition. However, KPP, along with the Polish Socialist Party, was notable for its decisive stand against antisemitism. According to Jaff Schatz's summary of Jewish participation in the prewar Polish Communist movement, "[t]hroughout the whole interwar period, Jews constituted a very important segment of the Communist movement. According to Polish sources and Western estimates, the proportion of Jews in the KPP [the Communist Party of Poland] was never lower than 22 percent. In the larger cities, the percentage of Jews in the KPP often exceeded 50 percent and in smaller cities, frequently over 60 percent. Given this background, a respondent's statement that 'in small cities like ours, almost all Communists were Jews,' does not appear to be a gross exaggeration." It was the disproportionately large representation of Jews in the communist leadership that led to Żydokomuna sentiment being widely expressed in contemporary Polish politics. However, the total number of Jewish Communists was low at 5,000–10,000 members or less than 1% of the Polish-Jewish population.

Share of Communist vote by religion and ethnicity (1928)
| Group | % voted Communist | % of Communist vote | % of population (1921 census) |
|---|---|---|---|
| East Orthodox Christians | 44% Ukrainian: 25% | | 10% |
| Uniate Ukrainians | 12% | | 12% |
| Jews | 7% | 14% | 11% |
| Catholics | 4% | 16% | 64% |

According to some bodies of research, voting patterns in Poland's parliamentary elections in the 1920s revealed that Jewish support for the Communists was proportionally less than their representation in the total population. In this view, most support for Poland's Communist and pro-Soviet parties came not from Jews, but rather from Ukrainian and Eastern Orthodox Christian Belarusian voters. Schatz notes that even if post-war claims by Jewish communists that 40% of the 266,528 Communist votes on several lists of front organizations at the 1928 Sejm election came from the Jewish community were true (a claim that one source describes as "almost certainly an exaggeration"), this would amount to no more than 5% of Jewish votes for the communists, indicating the Jewish population at large was "far from sympathetic to communism".

According to Jeffrey Kopstein, who analyzed the communist vote in interwar Poland, "[e]ven if Jews were prominent in the Communist Party leadership, this prominence did not translate into support at the mass level." Only 7% of Jewish voters supported Communists at the polls in 1928, while 93% of them supported non-communists (with 49% voting for Piłsudski). The pro-Soviet Communist party received most of its support from Belarusians whose separatism was backed by the Soviet Union and had been radicalized between 1922 and 1928 by a combination of Polish discrimination against them and Soviet interference in Polish politics; whereas 7% of Jewish voters supported Communists in 1928, 44% of Eastern Orthodox voters did, including around 25% of Orthodox Ukrainians and a figure likely rather higher than 44% among Belarusians. In Lwów, the CPP received 4% of the vote (of which 35% was Jewish), in Warsaw 14% (33% Jewish), and in Wilno 0.02% (36% Jewish). Among communist voters, Jews were not particularly prominent either, as only 14% of the communist vote came from Jews, less than the 16% which came from Catholics, and most of the rest coming from Orthodox Christians. While one viewpoint explains the high level of Jewish support for Pilsudski, higher than any other group, as Jews turning to him as a protector, another view holds that when faced with threats of a "nationalizing" ethnic Polish state, whereas Belarusians tended to turn to pro-Soviet "exit" strategies and Uniate Ukrainians threw their weight behind ethnic interest parties, Jews instead took a different strategy of showing their loyalty to Poland. Kopstein concluded: "Even in the face of both public and private prejudice, ... [m]ost Jews were thus politically neither "internationalist" nor ethnically exclusionary, as a large vote for the minority parties in 1928 would have indicated. Rather they were casting their lot with the Polish state. ... Our data do not speak to whether Jews were disproportionately represented among the leadership of interwar Poland's communist parties. Yet even if this were true, ... it means the Jews did not vote communist even when their co-ethnics were leading the communist parties."

=== Invasion of Poland and the Soviet occupation zone ===
Following the 1939 Soviet invasion of Poland, resulting in the partition of Polish territory between Nazi Germany and the Soviet Union (USSR), Jewish communities in eastern Poland welcomed with some relief the Soviet occupation, which they saw as a "lesser of two evils" than openly antisemitic Nazi Germany. The image of Jews among the Belarusian and Ukrainian minorities waving red flags to welcome Soviet troops had great symbolic meaning in Polish memory of the period. Jan T. Gross noted that "there were proportionately more communist sympathizers among Jews than among any other nationality in the local population". In the days and weeks following the events of September 1939, the Soviets engaged in a harsh policy of Sovietization. Polish schools and other institutions were closed, Poles were dismissed from jobs of authority, often arrested and deported, and replaced with non-Polish personnel. At the same time, 100,000 Jewish Poles fought to defend Poland against the Nazi-Soviet invasion, while at least 434 Polish Jews who had been awarded officer rank by the Polish Army were murdered by the Soviets in the Katyn Massacre because of their loyalty to Poland.

Many Poles resented their change of fortunes because, before the war, Poles had a privileged position compared to other ethnic groups of the Second Republic. Then, in the space of a few days, Jews and other minorities from within Poland (mainly Ukrainians and Belarusians) occupied newly vacant positions in the Soviet occupation government and administration—such as teachers, civil servants and engineers—positions that some claimed they had trouble achieving under the Polish government. What to the majority of Poles was occupation and betrayal was, to some Jews—especially Polish Communists of Jewish descent who emerged from the underground—an opportunity for revolution and retribution.

Such events further strengthened Żydokomuna sentiment that held Jews responsible for collaboration with the Soviet authorities in importing communism into divided Poland. After the German invasion of the Soviet Union in 1941, widespread notion of Judeo-Communism, combined with the German Nazi encouragement for expression of antisemitic attitudes, may have been a principal cause of massacres of Jews by gentile Poles in Poland's northeastern Łomża province in the summer of 1941, including according to Joanna B. Michlic the massacre at Jedwabne. Doris Bergen writes that "it was often precisely those Polish gentiles most deeply implicated in Soviet crimes who were quicket to take the lead in attacks on Jews—attacks that would serve both to deflect the anger of their neighbors and to curry favor with the new Germans occupiers."

Though some Jews had initially benefited from the effects of the Soviet invasion, this occupation soon began to strike at the Jewish population as well; independent Jewish organizations were abolished and Jewish activists were arrested. Hundreds of thousands of Jews who had fled to the Soviet sector were given a choice of Soviet citizenship or returning to the German-occupied zone. The majority chose the latter, and instead found themselves deported to the Soviet Union, where, ironically, 300,000 would escape the Holocaust. While there was Polish Jewish representation in the London-based Polish government in exile, relations between the Jews in Poland and Polish resistance in occupied Poland were strained, and armed Jewish groups had difficulty joining the official Polish resistance umbrella organization, the Home Army (in Polish, Armia Krajowa or AK), the heads of which often referred to them as "bandits". More acceptance was found within the smaller Armia Ludowa, the armed branch of the Polish Workers' Party, leading to some Jewish groups operating under their (and other Soviet partisan groups') auspices or protection, further strengthening the perception of Jews working with Soviets against the Poles.

=== Communist takeover of Poland in the aftermath of World War II ===
The Soviet-backed Communist government was as harsh towards non-Communist Jewish cultural, political and social institutions as they were towards Polish, banning all alternative parties. Thousands of Jews returned from exile in the Soviet Union, but as their number decreased with legalized aliyah to Israel, the PZPR members formed a much larger percentage of the remaining Jewish population. Among them were a number of Jewish communists who played a highly visible role in the unpopular Communist government and its security apparatus.

Hilary Minc, the third in command in Bolesław Bierut's political triumvirate of Stalinist leaders, became the Deputy Prime Minister, Minister of Industry, Industry and Commerce, and the Economic Affairs. He was personally assigned by Stalin first to Industry and then to Transportation ministries of Poland. His wife, Julia Minc, became the editor-in-chief of the monopolized Polish Press Agency. Minister Jakub Berman—Stalin's right hand in Poland until 1953—held the Political propaganda and Ideology portfolios. He was responsible for the largest and most notorious secret police in the history of the People's Republic of Poland, the Ministry of Public Security (UB), employing 33,200 permanent security officers, one for every 800 Polish citizens.

The new government's hostility to the wartime Polish Government in Exile and its World War II underground resistance—accused by the media of being nationalist, reactionary and antisemitic, and persecuted by Berman—further strengthened Żydokomuna sentiment to the point where in the popular consciousness Jewish Bolshevism was seen as having conquered Poland. It was in this context, reinforced by the immediate post-war lawlessness, that Poland experienced an unprecedented wave of anti-Jewish violence (of which most notable was the Kielce pogrom).

According to Michael C. Steinlauf, the Polish communists who took power in Poland were mainly KPP members who sheltered in Moscow during the war, and included many Jews who thus survived the Holocaust. In addition, since Jews were excluded from the government of the Second Polish Republic, other Jews were attracted by the openness of the Communist government to accept them. Some Jews changed their names to Polish sounding names, fueling speculation of "hidden Jews" in subsequent decades; however, Steinlauf says that the reality of Jewish representation in government was "nowhere near" the Żydokomuna stereotype. In parallel, Steinlauf writes that 1,500 to 2,000 Jews were murdered between 1944 and 1947 in the worse spate of anti-Jewish violence in the history of Polish-Jewish relations. These attacks were accompanied by classic blood libel, brought international notoriety to Poland, and reinforced the notion that the Communist government was the sole force that could protect the Jews. However, most Jews were convinced by the widespread pogroms that Poland held no future for them. By 1951, when the government banned immigration to Israel, only 80,000 Jews remained in Poland and many of them did so since they believed in the Communist government.

The combination of the effects of the Holocaust and postwar antisemitism led to a dramatic mass emigration of Polish Jewry in the immediate postwar years. Of the estimated 240,000 Jews in Poland in 1946 (of whom 136,000 were refugees from the Soviet Union, most on their way to the West), only 90,000 remained a year later. Regarding this period, Andre Gerrits wrote in his study of Żydokomuna, that even though for the first time in history they had entered the top echelons of power in considerable numbers, "The first post-war decade was a mixed experience for the Jews of East Central Europe. The new Communist order offered unprecedented opportunities as well as unforeseen dangers."

=== Stalinist abuses ===
During Stalinism, the preferred Soviet policy was to keep sensitive posts in the hands of non-Poles. As a result, "all or nearly all of the directors (of the widely despised Ministry of Public Security of Poland) were Jewish" as claimed by Polish journalist Teresa Torańska among others. A recent study by the Polish Institute of National Remembrance showed that out of 450 people in director positions in the Ministry between 1944 and 1954, 167 (37.1%) were of Jewish ethnicity, while Jews made up only 1% of the post-war Polish population. While Jews were overrepresented in various Polish Communist organizations, including the security apparatus, relative to their percentage of the general population, the vast majority of Jews did not participate in the Stalinist apparatus, and indeed most were not supportive of Communism. Krzysztof Szwagrzyk has quoted Jan T. Gross, who argued that many Jews who worked for the Communist party cut their ties with their culture (Jewish, Polish, or Russian), and tried to represent the interests of international communism only, or at least that of the local Communist government. Leszek W. Gluchowski wrote:

It is difficult to assess when the Polish Jews who had volunteered to serve or remain in the postwar communist security forces began to realize, however, what Soviet Jews had realized earlier, that under Stalin, as Arkady Vaksberg put it: "if someone named Rabinovich was in charge of a mass execution, he was perceived not simply as a Cheka boss but as a Jew, while if someone named Abramovich was in charge of a mass epidemic countermeasure, he was perceived not as a Jew but as a good doctor."

Among the notable Jewish officials of the Polish secret police and security services were Minister Jakub Berman, Joseph Stalin's right hand in the PRL; Vice-minister Roman Romkowski (deputy head of MBP), Dir. Julia Brystiger (5th Dept.), Dir. Anatol Fejgin (10th Dept. or the notorious Special Bureau), deputy Dir. Józef Światło (10th Dept.), Col. Józef Różański among others. Światło, "a torture master", defected to the West in 1953, while Romkowski and Różański would find themselves among the Jewish scapegoats for Polish Stalinism in the political upheavals following Stalin's death, both sentenced to 15 years in prison on 11 November 1957 for gross violations of human rights law and abuse of power, but released 1964. In 1956, over 9,000 socialist and populist politicians were released from prison. A few Jewish functionaries of the security forces were brought to court in the process of de-Stalinization. According to Heather Laskey, it was not a coincidence that the high ranking Stalinist security officers put on trial by Gomułka were Jews. Władysław Gomułka was captured by Światło, imprisoned by Romkowski in 1951, and interrogated by both, him and Fejgin. Gomułka escaped physical torture only as a close associate of Joseph Stalin, and was released three years later. According to some sources, the categorization of the security forces as a Jewish institution—as disseminated in the post-war anti-communist press at various times—was rooted in Żydokomuna: the belief that the secret police was predominantly Jewish became one of the factors contributing to the post-war view of Jews as agents of the security forces.

The Żydokomuna sentiment reappeared at times of severe political and socioeconomic crises in Stalinist Poland. After the death of Polish United Workers' Party leader Bolesław Bierut in 1956, a de-Stalinization and a subsequent battle among rival factions looked to lay blame for the excesses of the Stalin era. According to Gluchowski, "Poland's Communists had grown accustomed to placing the burden of their own failures to gain sufficient legitimacy among the Polish population during the entire Communist period on the shoulders of Jews in the party." As described in one historical account, the party hardline Natolin faction "used anti-Semitism as a political weapon and found an echo both in the party apparatus and in society at large, where traditional stereotypes of an insidious Jewish cobweb of political influence and economic gain resurfaced, but now in the context of 'Judeo-Communism,' the Żydokomuna." "Natolin" leader Zenon Nowak entered the concept of "Judeo-Stalinization" and placed the blame for the party's failures, errors and repression on "the Jewish apparatchiks". Documents from this period chronicle antisemitic attitudes within Polish society, including beatings of Jews, loss of employment, and persecution. These outbursts of antisemitic sentiment from both Polish society and within the rank and file of the ruling party spurred the exodus of some 40,000 Polish Jews between 1956 and 1958.

=== 1968 expulsions ===
Żydokomuna sentiment was reignited by Polish Communist state propaganda as part of the 1968 Polish political crisis. The political turmoil of the late 1960s—exemplified in the West by increasingly violent protests against the Vietnam War—was closely associated in Poland with the events of the Prague Spring which began on 5 January 1968, raising hopes of democratic reforms among the intelligentsia. The crisis culminated in the Warsaw Pact invasion of Czechoslovakia on 20 August 1968. The repressive government of Władysław Gomułka responded to student protests and strike actions across Poland (Warsaw, Kraków) with mass arrests, and by launching an anti-Zionist campaign within the Communist party on the initiative of Interior Minister Mieczysław Moczar, also known as Mikołaj Diomko and best known for his xenophobic and antisemitic attitude. The officials of Jewish descent were blamed "for a major part, if not all, of the crimes and horrors of the Stalinist period."

The campaign, which began in 1967, was a well-guided response to the Six-Day War and the subsequent break-off by the Soviets of all diplomatic relations with Israel. Polish factory workers were forced to publicly denounce Zionism. As the interior minister Mieczysław Moczar's nationalist "Partisan" faction became increasingly influential in the Communist party, infighting within the Polish Communist party led one faction to again make scapegoats of the remaining Polish Jews, attempting to redirect public anger at them. After Israel's victory in the war, the Polish government, following the Soviet lead, launched an antisemitic campaign under the guise of "anti-Zionism", with both Moczar's and Party Secretary Władysław Gomułka's factions playing leading roles; however, the campaign did not resonate with the general public, because most Poles saw similarities between Israel's fight for survival and Poland's past struggles for independence. Many Poles felt pride in the success of the Israeli military, which was dominated by Polish Jews. The slogan "Our Jews beat the Soviet Arabs" was very popular among the Poles but contrary to the desire of the Communist government. The government's antisemitic policy yielded more successes the next year. In March 1968, a wave of unrest among students and intellectuals, unrelated to the Arab-Israeli War, swept Poland (the events became known as the March 1968 events). The campaign served multiple purposes, most notably the suppression of protests, which were branded as inspired by a "fifth column" of Zionists; it was also used as a tactic in a political struggle between Gomułka and Moczar, both of whom played the Jewish card in a nationalist appeal. The campaign resulted in an actual expulsion from Poland in two years, of thousands of Jewish professionals, party officials and state security functionaries. Ironically, the Moczar's faction failed to topple Gomułka with its propaganda efforts.

As historian Dariusz Stola notes, the anti-Jewish campaign combined century-old conspiracy theories, recycled antisemitic claims and classic communist propaganda. Regarding the tailoring of the Żydokomuna sentiment to Communist Poland, Stola suggested: "Paradoxically, probably the most powerful slogan of the communist propaganda in March was the accusation that the Jews were zealous communists. They were blamed for a major part, if not all, of the crimes and horrors of the Stalinist period. The myth of Judeo-Bolshevism had been well known in Poland since the Russian revolution and the Polish-Bolshevik war of 1920, yet its 1968 model deserves interest as a tool of communist propaganda. This accusation exploited and developed the popular stereotype of Jewish communism to purify communism: the Jews were the dark side of communism; what was wrong in communism was due to them." The Communist elites used the "Jews as Zionists" allegations to push for a purge of Jews from scientific and cultural institutions, publishing houses, and national television and radio stations. Ultimately, the Communist government sponsored an antisemitic campaign that resulted in most remaining Jews being forced to leave Poland. Moczar's "Partisan" faction promulgated an ideology that has been described as an "eerie reincarnation" of the views of the pre-World War II National Democracy Party, and even at times exploiting Żydokomuna sentiment. Stola also says that one of the effects of the 1968 antisemitic campaign was to thoroughly discredit the Communist government in the eyes of the public. When the concept of the Jew as a "threatening other" was employed in the 1970s and 1980s in Poland by the Communist government in its attacks on the political opposition, including the Solidarity trade-union movement and the Workers' Defence Committee (Komitet Obrony Robotników, or KOR), it was completely unsuccessful.

== Relation with other antisemitic beliefs ==
According to Niall Ferguson, Jews were in some ways treated better under Soviet rule than under Polish rule, leading to better integration in civil society. This was quickly seized on and exaggerated by Poles as proof of the "alleged affinity between Judaism and Bolshevism." Age-old fear of Russia coupled with anti-communist and antisemitic attitudes supported this belief, and in turn amplified ideas of an alleged Jewish "conspiracy" for world domination. According to David Wyman and Charles Rosenzveig, to those who believed in Żydokomuna, Bolshevism and communism were "the modern means to the long-attempted Jewish political conquest of Poland; the Żydokomuna conspirators would finally succeed in establishing a 'Judeo-Polonia.'" According to Jaff Schatz, this had perverse results "because antisemitism was one of the main forces that drew Jews to the Communist movement, Żydokomuna meant turning the effects of antisemitism into a cause of its further increase."

Discussion of the Żydokomuna myth and its relation to the broader subject of Polish-Jewish relations remains a sensitive subject in Polish society. Omer Bartov writes that "recent writings and pronouncements seem to indicate that the myth of the Żydokomuna ... has not gone away", as evidenced by the writings of scholars like Marek Chodakiewicz, who contend there was Jewish disloyalty to Poland during the Soviet occupation. (Note: Bartov refers to Chodakiewicz's book After the Holocaust, written about the postwar violence in Poland after the Soviet takeover. Amid a raging Polish anti-Communist insurgency, the Polish Jewish Communists returning from the Soviet Union fought to establish a revolutionary Marxist–Leninist regime, thus adding to the stereotype of Żydokomuna among some Poles. According to him, some younger academics in Poland have questioned the loyalty of Jews during the Soviet occupation, reflecting a "right-wing turn" in Polish politics. Bartov refers in particular to Marek Jan Chodakiewicz and Marek Wierzbicki.) Joanna B. Michlic and Laurence Weinbaum charge that post-1989 Polish historiography has seen a revival of an "ethnonationalist historical approach". According to Michlic, among some Polish historians, "[the myth of żydokomuna] served the purpose of rationalizing and explaining the participation of ethnic Poles in killing their Jewish neighbors and, thus, in minimizing the criminal nature of the murder."

== See also ==
- History of the Jews in Poland
- History of the Jews in Russia: Jews in the revolutionary movement
- Jewish Bolshevism
- Puławians

== Bibliography ==
- Bartov, Omer (2007). Erased: Vanishing Traces of Jewish Galicia in Present-day Ukraine. Princeton University Press. p. 206. ISBN 9780691131214. "Some younger Polish scholars claim again that the nation's Jewish citizens were disloyal to it during the Soviet occupation and therefore had to be suppressed by the forces of the state."
