= Central Zionist Archives =

Archive of the institutions of the Zionist movement

Coordinates: 31°47′12.7″N 35°12′3.6″E

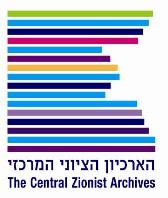

Central Zionist Archives (CZA; Hebrew: הארכיון הציוני המרכזי) is the official archive of the institutions of the Zionist Movement: the World Zionist Organization, the Jewish Agency, the Jewish National Fund, and Keren Hayesod/the United Israel Appeal as well as the archives of the World Jewish Congress. The archive is located in West Jerusalem adjacent to Binyanei HaUma.

== Overview ==
The CZA preserves the files created in the course of the activities of these bodies and the secondary bodies created by them. In addition, the Central Zionist Archives holds the files of the institutions of the Jewish population in Palestine before the establishment of the State of Israel. Similarly, the Central Zionist Archives preserves more than 1,500 personal papers of the leaders and activists of the Zionist Movement and the Jewish population in Palestine before the establishment of the State. The list of personal papers includes well-known figures in modern Zionist history, such as Theodor Herzl, Nahum Sokolow, David Wolffsohn, Max Bodenheimer, Henrietta Szold, Eliezer Ben Yehuda, Haim Arlosoroff and other functionaries and professionals.

The CZA collections include: files and printed material, a Maps and Plans Collection, a Photograph Collection, a Posters and Handbills Collection, a Newspaper and Periodicals Collection, a library, a Microfilm Collection, an Audio Collection and an Artifacts Collection.

== History ==
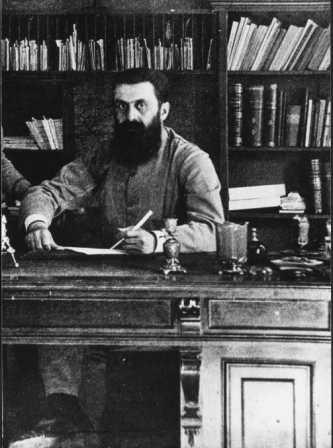
Theodor Herzl. From the photograph collection of the CZA

The Central Zionist Archives was founded in 1919 in Berlin by the historian George Herlitz who was nominated to the position of the archivist of the Zionist Executive, by the member of the Executive, Arthur Hantke. At the start, files of the Central Zionist Offices in Vienna and Cologne were transferred to the new institution, and thereafter the files of the Jewish National Fund and the Central Zionist Office in London. Concurrently the Archives began to collect books, periodicals and photographs that documented the history of the Zionist Movement and Palestine in the modern era.

With the rise to power of the Nazis in 1933, Dr. Herlitz asked for permission from the German authorities to remove the Archives from Germany. When permission was received, the material was packed in boxes and transferred to Jerusalem. The Archives was housed in the basement of the National Institutions building in Jerusalem. It was opened to the public in the autumn of 1934.

With the Archives' transfer to Jerusalem, its collections expanded considerably; in addition to holding the material of the various Zionist bodies, it also undertook to be the historical archives for the institutions of the new Yishuv. Concurrently, the systematic collection of the private papers of the leaders of the Zionist Movement and the Yishuv was begun. After the Second World War, an increased effort was made to bring to Palestine/Israel the scarce archival material that had survived the War.

The 24th Zionist Congress convened in Jerusalem in 1956, and defined the status and the functions of the Central Zionist Archives as the "historic archives of the Zionist Movement and Organization and the Jewish Agency". The Congress passed a resolution that all the offices and institutions of the Executive of the Zionist Organization and the Jewish Agency are obliged to make all the files accessible to the Archives that are no longer necessary for their ongoing work.

The construction of the new building began in 1985 in proximity to the International Convention Center in Jerusalem. The architect Moshe Zarhi designed the new building. The building has six floors: two upper floors where there are the reading hall, a lecture room, a lobby for exhibitions and the offices of the Archives, and four underground floors where the various collections are stored.

The new building was inaugurated in 1987.

In the 2000s, the CZA embarked on a project to computerize and digitize its materials. The computer system contains about 2,876,000 records, and about 12,518,000 scanned documents, photographs, maps, posters and graphic material.

== Notable collections ==
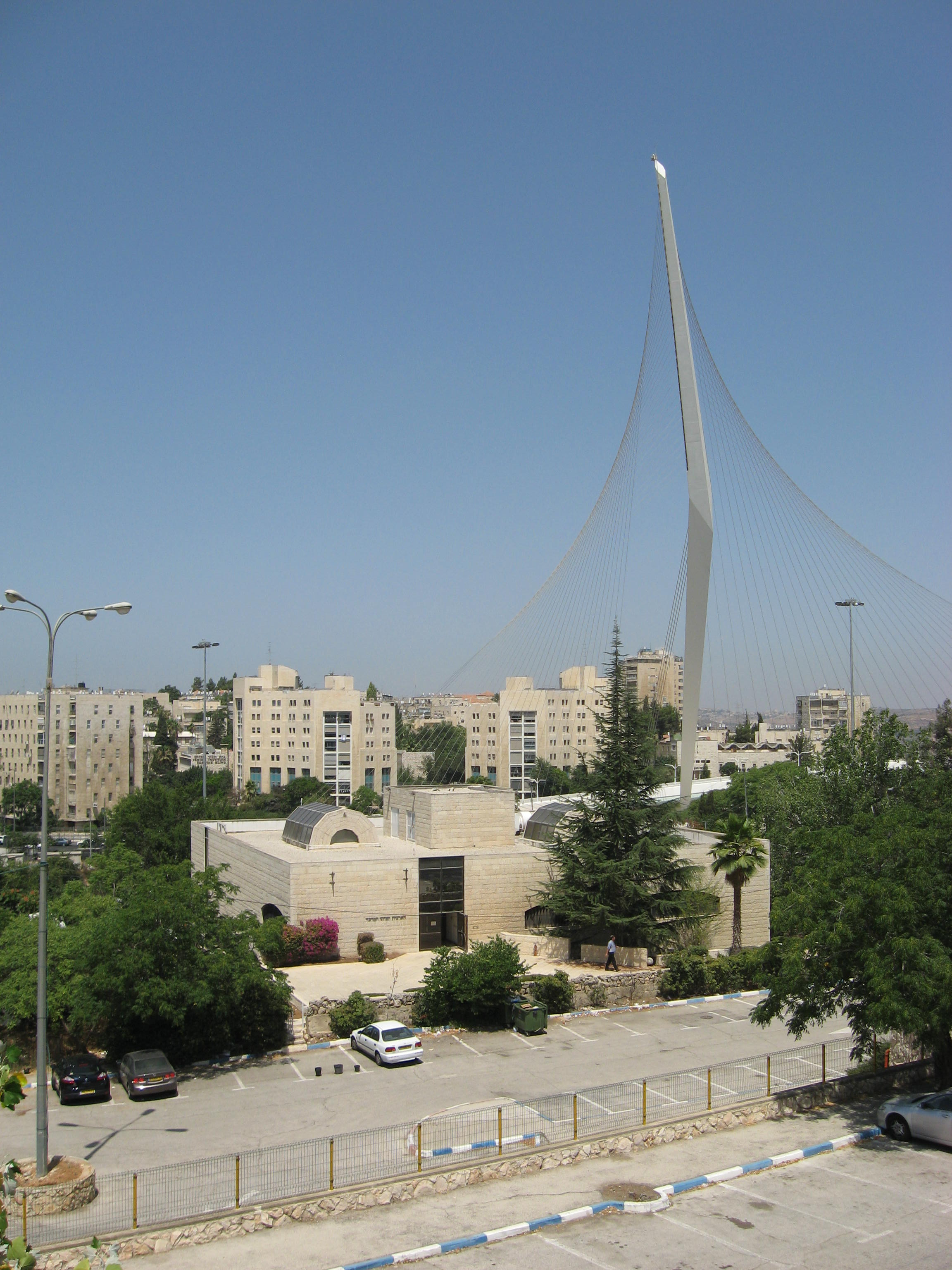
CZA building, Jerusalem

- The personal papers of Theodor Herzl were transferred from Vienna to Palestine in 1937.
- With the establishment of the State of Israel in 1948, many files of the General Council (the Va'ad Leumi) and of various departments of the Jewish Agency were transferred to the Archives, including the files of the Political Department of the Jewish Agency.

Alex Bein was appointed Director of the Central Zionist Archives in 1955. Among the objectives that he set for himself were the locating of archives of Zionist personalities and associations that survived the Holocaust, including the archives of Max Nordau and Nahum Sokolow, and their transfer to Israel.
