= Zionist Federation of Germany =

Largest Zionist Organisation

The Zionist Federation of Germany (German: Zionistische Vereinigung für Deutschland) also known as the Zionist Association for Germany was a Zionist organisation in Germany that was formed in 1897 in Cologne by Max Bodenheimer, together with David Wolffsohn and Fabius Schach. It had attracted 10,000 members by 1914 and was by far the largest Zionist organisation in Germany. The group supported the 1933 Haavara Agreement between Nazi Germany and German Zionist Jews which was designed to encourage German Jews to emigrate to Palestine. They also opposed the Anti-Nazi boycott of 1933 fearing that it could make the existing Nazi boycott of Jewish businesses more severe.

== Presidents ==
- Max Bodenheimer (1894–1910)
- Arthur Hantke (1910–1920)
- Felix Rosenblüth (1920–1923)
- Alfred Landsberg (1923–1924)
- Kurt Blumenfeld (1924–1933)
- Siegfried Moses (1933–1937)
- Hans Friedenthal, since 1936 per pro
