= Annamaria Orla-Bukowska =

Social anthropologist

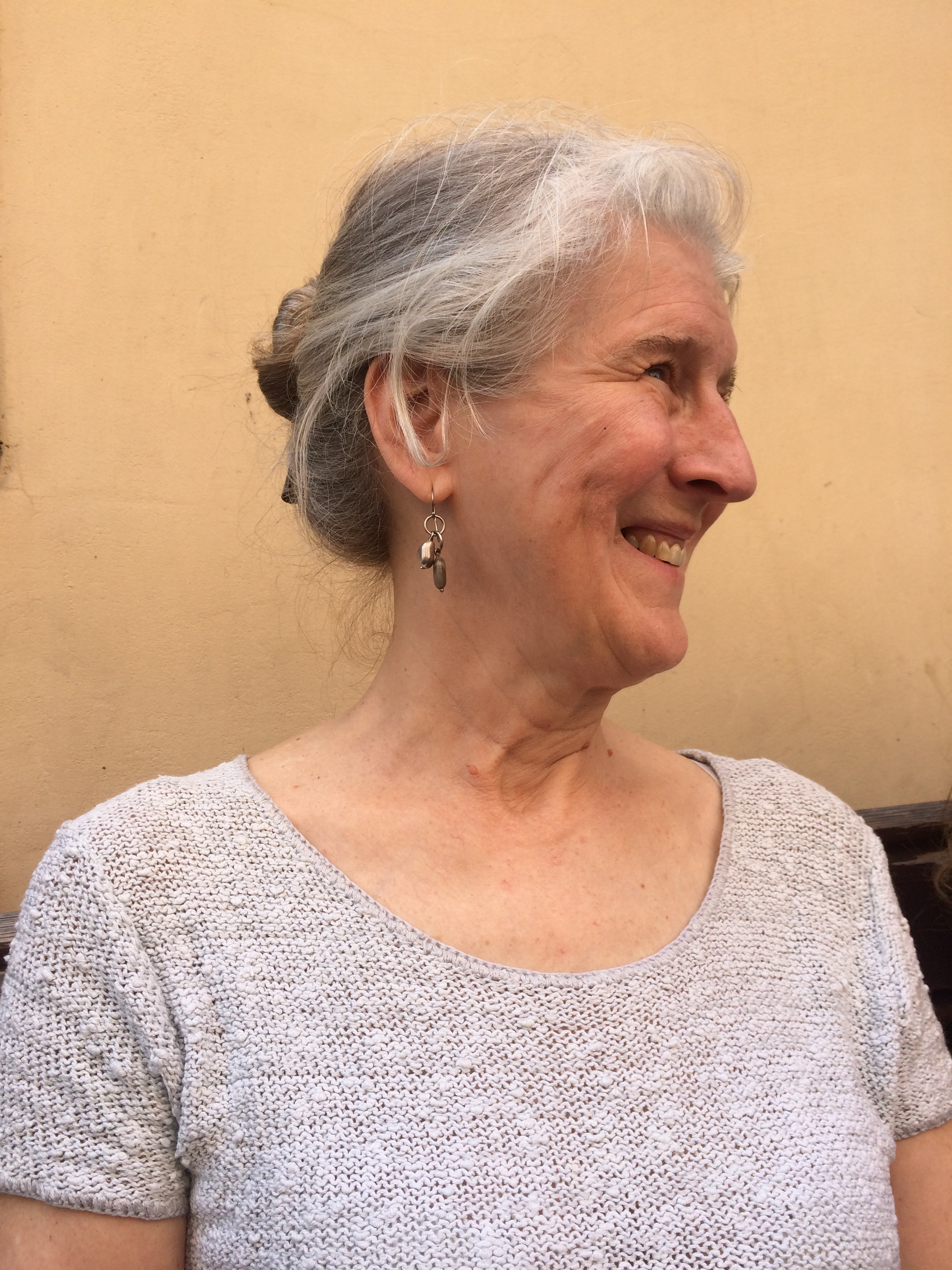
- Annamaria Orla-Bukowska, Kraków, 2019
- Born: 1953 (age 72–73)

Academic work
- Discipline: Social anthropology
- Institutions: Jagiellonian University; Polish Academy of Sciences

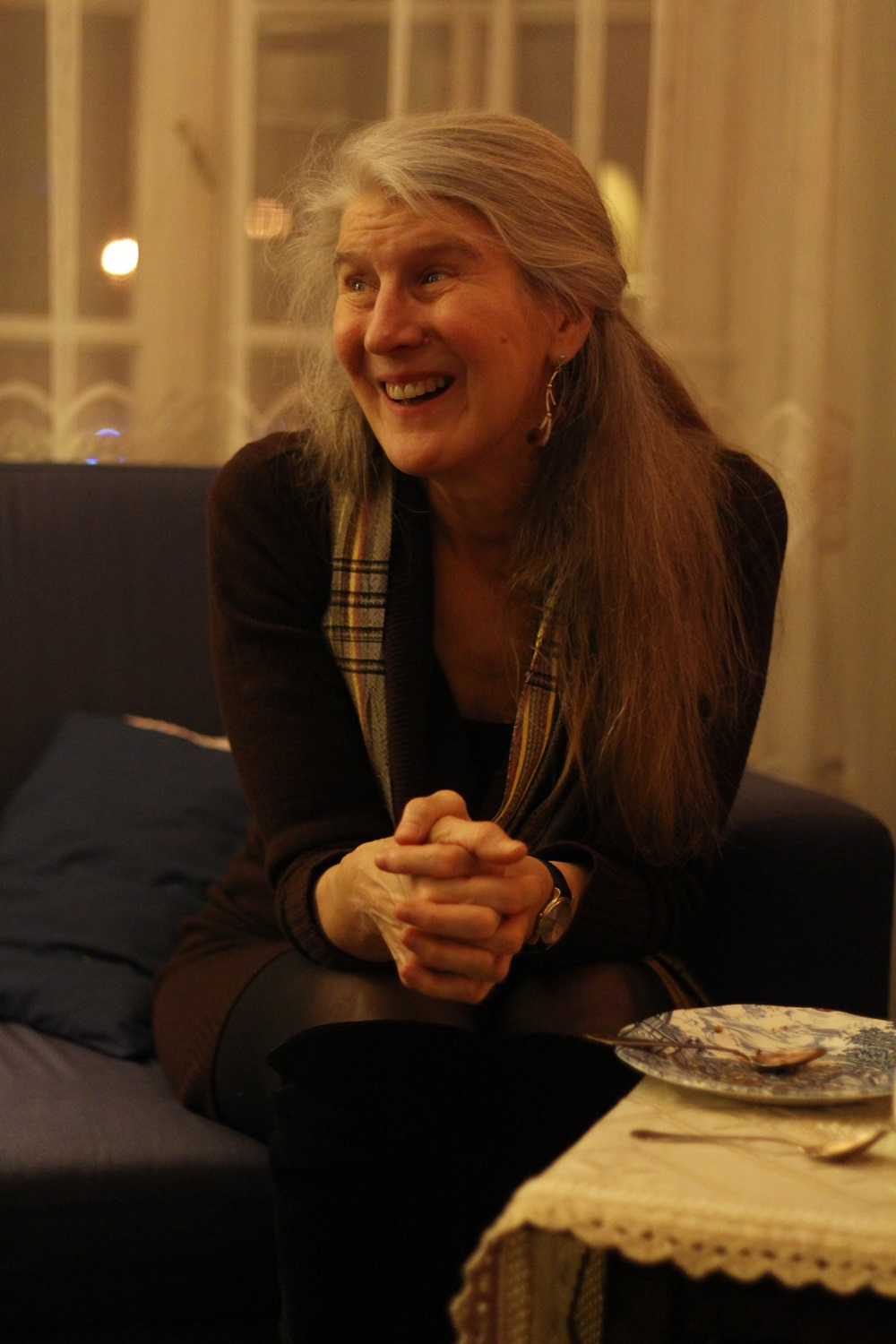
Annamaria Orla-Bukowska, 2015

Annamaria Orla-Bukowska (born 1953) is a social anthropologist at the Institute of Sociology of the Jagiellonian University in Kraków and the Professor–Lecturer at the Center for Social Studies–Graduate School for Social Research of the Polish Academy of Sciences in Warsaw.

== Biography ==
In 1982 she graduated in English philology from the Southern Illinois University at Carbondale. In 1995 she obtained Ph.D. upon the thesis supervised by Zdzisław Mach.

Her general field of research is genocide and its social consequences as well as majority–minority relations. Her interests include also institutionalized inequality, religious, cultural, social and political so-called “Polish-Jewish” relations from the 19th century, the shtetl, Galicia, the Holocaust, the role of non-governmental organizations in post-communist Poland, sociology of emotions – the positive consequences of negative emotions for collective identity, Jehovah's Witnesses during the communist era in the Polish People's Republic.

Annamaria Orla-Bukowska is a 2004 Yad Vashem Fellow.

Annamaria Orla-Bukowska is the co-author of Rethinking Poles and Jews: Troubled Past, Brighter Future, the 2007 book produced in collaboration with Robert Cherry of Brooklyn College and published in English as well as in Polish under the title Polacy i Żydzi – kwestia otwarta (pictured). It consists of a series of essays devoted to the subject of the Holocaust in Poland; one of the first books to address the negative assumptions and anti-Polish bias in the Holocaust literature. The book was described by Michael C. Steinlauf as "a ray of light amidst the acrimonious and generally uninformed polemics" and by Deborah Lipstadt as "a series of essays that pierce the stereotypes which have obscured historical reality".

== Selected works ==
- Annamaria Orla-Bukowska, Grażyna Skąpska; "The moral fabric in contemporary societies", Institut international de sociologie, Volume 2001. World Congress, 2003. 379 pages
- Annamaria Orla-Bukowska, Robert D. Cherry, Rethinking Poles and Jews: troubled past, brighter future, 2007. 230 pages, Holocaust Studies
- Annamaria Orla-Bukowska, Robert Cherry, Polacy i Zydzi: Kwestia Otwarta. Warsaw: Wiez. Polish edition of Rethinking Poles and Jews, 2009
- Annamaria Orla-Bukowska, Krzysztof Gorlach, Zygmunt Seręga, Family farming in the contemporary world: East-West comparisons, 1995. 187 pages
- Annamaria Orla-Bukowska, Book of abstracts: crossing categorical boundaries, Biennial EASA Conference, European Association of Social Anthropologists – 2000. 306 pages

== Translation ==
- The Nation’s Longue Durée. Social Dimensions of Polishness (1988–2021) (PDF). Warsaw: Collegium Civitas Press. 2022. ISBN 978-83-66386-30-3.
- A Sociological Agora. Master Lectures from Poland, edited by Kaja Gadowska, Jagiellonian University Press, 2023. 200 pages
