= Fabius Schach =

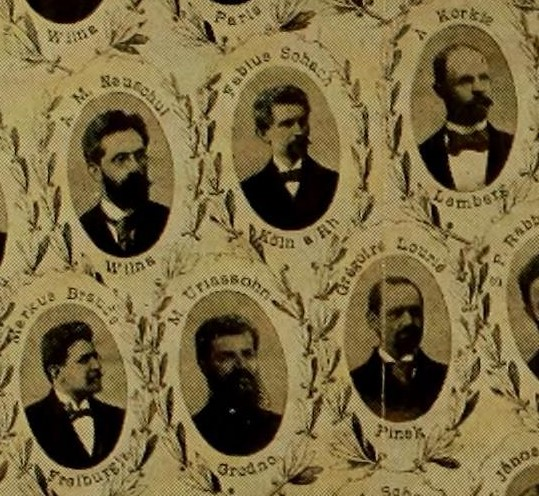
Fabius Schach in the picture of the participants of the First Zionist Congress in 1897

Fabius Schach (born January 10, 1868, in Wexna, Lithuania, Russian Empire; died in 1930 at an unknown location or on October 3, 1942, in the Theresienstadt ghetto) was a German Zionist.

== Life ==
Fabius Schach attended the yeshiva and then went to Riga and Berlin to study. Max Bodenheimer found him a job as a Hebrew teacher in Cologne in 1893. Together with Moritz Levy, David Wolffsohn and Rahel Apfel, they founded the "National-Jewish Association", from which the Zionist Association for Germany emerged in 1897. In 1893 he published the pamphlet Volks- oder Salonjudenthum? Schach attended the 1st Zionist Congress in 1897 and took part in the formulation of the Basel Program.

Schach and Theodor Herzl got to know each other, and Schach spent the next few years working in Karlsruhe and Berlin. In 1914, he wrote an essay on the disturbed relationship between western and eastern Jews in Germany in the journal Ost und West. From 1911 to 1915 he was editor of the independent journal Israelitisches Wochenblatt : Zentral-Organ für die gesamten Interessen des Judentums. During the First World War, he worked as an editor in Hamburg.

There is no conclusive information about Schach's further life. According to the personal article in the Encyclopaedia Judaica, he lived until 1930. According to the surviving files from the Theresienstadt ghetto, he was deported from the forced apartment at Dahlmannstraße 24 in Berlin to Theresienstadt on September 15, 1942, and died there on October 3, 1942, as a result of the prison conditions. The search function in the catalog of the German National Library shows 7 cataloged journal articles in the "Jüdisches Nachrichtenblatt" published by the Jewish Cultural Association in Germany from the years 1936 to May 1941.

His sister Myriam Schach (1867–1956) was a French Zionist and the founder of the Women's International Zionist Organization, which is dedicated to social welfare, the advancement of women and Jewish education.

== Selected writings ==
- Eine auferstandene Sprache, litterarische Skizze von Fabius Schach. Berlin : H. Schildberger, 1892
- Volks- oder Salonjudenthum?. Berlin : Schildberger, 1893
- Der Antisemitismus der Gegenwart und seine Abwehr, ein Weckruf an die deutschen Juden von F.S. Mülheim a R. : K. Glitscher, 1895
- Die Ausländerfrage in Deutschland. In: Ost und West, Mai 1902, Sp. 305–316
- Ueber die Zukunft Israels – eine kritische Betrachtung. Berlin : Poppelauer, 1904
- Die "Fremdenfrage" : (zum Fall Duisburg). In: Ost und West, Januar 1914, Sp. 9–20
- Sich wiederfinden!, in: Der Schild, Nr. 19, 13. Oktober 1933, S. 171/172
- Das Buch Ruth, in: Jüdisches Nachrichtenblatt, 30. Mai 1941, S. 5 DNB
