= The Generation: The Rise and Fall of the Jewish Communists of Poland =

1991 non-fiction book by Jaff Schatz

- Author: Jaff Schatz
- Language: English
- Subject: Polish-Jewish history, history of communism
- Publisher: University of California Press
- Publication date: 1991
- Publication place: United States
- Pages: 408
- ISBN: 0520071360
- Dewey Decimal: 943.8/004924
- LC Class: DS135.P6 S264 1991

The Generation: The Rise and Fall of the Jewish Communists of Poland is a 1991 book about the intersection of communism in Poland and Polish Jewry. Its primary focus are the Polish Jews of the generation born in the early 1900s, many of whom embraced the communist ideology.

The author, Jaff Schatz, is a Polish-Swedish professor of sociology, founder and first director of the Institute for Jewish Culture at Lund University, Sweden. The book is based on his PhD thesis, which he completed at Lund University's Department of Sociology in 1990.

== Content ==
The main focus of the book, the titular "generation", is the story of those Polish Jews, mainly born around 1905-15, who became converts to the ideology of communism. Many of them were imprisoned in the Second Polish Republic, found refuge in the Soviet Union during World War II, then became members of the new communist regime in Poland until most were forced to emigrate during the anti-Zionist campaign that was a major element of the 1968 Polish political crisis. Tony Judt, commenting on the importance of this group, noted that "Jews played a major role throughout the European Communist movement, but nowhere more than in Poland". They formed a distinct minority among Polish communists, with their number estimated by Schatz as about 10,000 strong.

Judt noted among the communist activists in early, post-war years in Poland, "Jews who often stood out: for their philo-Soviet enthusiasm, their relative uninterest in matters of purely Polish concern, and their ideological rigidity", and in turn, when Stalin withdrew his support for the Zionists and Israel, they became "easy and natural targets." Michael C. Steinlauf noted that many of them have gained a notorious reputation in Poland, "believed to have masterminded the enslavement [of that country]", and become "demonized" as part of the Zydokomuna canard. Martin Berger described them as a "much abused group... uncomfortably visible among the leadership of the postwar state... ready scapegoats for all that went wrong."

The book is based on Schatz's dissertation thesis and its source material of about forty-five interviews by the author with members of this group. It also contains significant theoretical discussion on the sociological concept of generation.

== Reception ==
Zygmunt Bauman, reviewing the early manuscript for Acta Sociologica in 1990, called the book a "remarkable study" and "a document of lasting value", documenting a cultural generation on the brink of passing out of existence.

Tony Judt, writing a review of the book for Canadian-American Slavic Studies in 1991, described the book as an account of "Communism's betrayal of its Jewish supporters" and praised it as "worthy and well-intentioned", "reliable and scholarly" and "a close and careful account of the place of Jews in the history of Polish Communism". He did, however, criticize the book for a rather dry and academic tone.

Martin Berger, reviewing the book for the History Reviews of New Books in 1992, wrote that the author "tells a poignant and fascinating story" and commented on its being surprisingly engaging considering the academic subject matter.

Edward D. Wynot, Jr., in his 1993 review for The American Historical Review, positively reviewed the book, calling it a "meticulously researched, carefully constructed study". Also that year, Jerzy Tomaszewski, reviewing the book for Shofar: An Interdisciplinary Journal of Jewish Studies, noted that the book has several weak points, such as insufficient comparison between the studied group and other comparable ones; but concluded that it is "a very interesting and valuable description of a Jewish generation striving for a better world".

Michael C. Steinlauf, reviewing the book for the Slavic Review in 1995, criticized it for being based primarily on interviews conducted in Sweden and Denmark, noting that it would be more generalizable if the author had made the effort to conduct more interviews in other countries. Methodology issues aside, Steinlauf notes that "what is best" about the book is the author's attempt to analyze the motivations of the people of the discussed generation.

== See also ==
- Communism in Poland
