= Robert D. Cherry =

American academic (born 1944)

- Born: 1944 (age 81–82)
- Occupation: Academic

Academic background
- Education: Kansas State University

Academic work
- Discipline: Economics
- Institutions: Brooklyn College

Robert D. Cherry (born 1944) is an American academic who is professor emeritus at Brooklyn College, with a Ph.D. in Economics from Kansas State University received in 1968. Before retiring, he was Broeklundian Professor at Brooklyn College.

== Academic interests ==
Cherry's main areas of interest include race and gender earnings disparities in America, issues of poverty, low-income housing, tax reform to benefit working families, domestic relations, and immigration. These and other similar subjects are featured in his latest social policy book, published by NYU Press under the title, Moving Working Families Forward: Third Way Policies That Work. Cherry conducts studies of black and Latino students who graduate with degrees from less competitive colleges in the private sector.

Cherry has written extensively on the subject of discrimination and race, as well as the Holocaust in Poland. He is a member of 1776 Unites.

== Rethinking Poles and Jews ==
Cherry is the co-author of Rethinking Poles and Jews: Troubled Past, Brighter Future, published simultaneously in Poland as Polacy i Żydzi – kwestia otwarta, one of the first books to address the negative assumptions and anti-Polish bias in the Holocaust literature. The book, produced in collaboration with Annamaria Orla-Bukowska of Jagiellonian University in Kraków, was published in English as well as in Polish. It was described by Michael C. Steinlauf as "a ray of light amidst the acrimonious and generally uninformed polemics" and by Deborah Lipstadt as "a series of essays that pierce the stereotypes which have obscured historical reality".

== Selected works ==
- With Robert Lerman, Moving Working Families Forward: Third-way Policies That Work. New York University Press, 2011
- "Kaplan University and the Short-changing of Minority Women". Minding the Campus, November 11, 2010
- "Sound and Fury: The Bayoumi Uproar". Minding the Campus, October 24, 2010
- "A Response to Mathur and Hassett's Commentary on Taxes". Spotlight on Poverty, November 23, 2009
- "The Follow of Academic College for All". Teachers College Record, August 24, 2009
- "Using Child Care Tax Benefits in New York State". CPA Journal, March: 10–15, 2009
- With Annamaria Orla-Bukowska, Polacy i Zydzi: Kwestia Otwarta. Warsaw: Wiez. Polish edition of Rethinking Poles and Jews, 2009
- "But It Works: The Bottom Line on Welfare Reform". Commonweal, September 2008
- "Welfare Reform: The Untold Story". New Labor Forum 17, Spring: 81–98; modified version in Jewish Currents 62, January–February: 12–18, 2008
- "Why Welfare Critics Went Astray?" Journal of Women, Politics & Policy 29.2: 207–30, 2008
- "Welfare Transformed: Universalizing Family Policies That Work", 2007
- "Discrimination: Its Economic Impact on Blacks, Women, and Jews", 1989
