= Mitteleuropa =

German concept of Central Europe

Mitteleuropa (German: [ˈmɪtl̩ʔɔʏˌʁoːpa]), meaning Middle Europe, is one of the German terms for Central Europe. The term has acquired diverse cultural, political and historical connotations. The Prussian vision of Mitteleuropa was a pan-Germanist state-centric imperium, an idea that was later adopted in a modified form by Nazi geopoliticians.

== Conceptual history ==
=== Medieval migrations ===
By the mid-14th century, when the Black Death brought an end to the 500-year-long Ostsiedlung process, populations from Western Europe had moved into the "Wendish" Central European areas of Germania Slavica far beyond the Elbe and Saale rivers. They had moved along the Baltic coast from Holstein to Farther Pomerania (in the Kingdom of Poland), up the Oder river to the Moravian Gate, down the Danube into the Kingdom of Hungary and into the Slovene lands of Carniola. From the mouth of the Vistula river and the Prussian region, the Teutonic Knights by force continued the migration through the Grand Duchy of Lithuania, up to the Estonian Reval (Tallinn) in the Livonian Confederation (encompassing the areas of present-day Estonia, Latvia and northern Lithuania). They had also settled the mountainous border regions of Bohemia and Moravia and formed a distinct social class of citizens in towns like Prague, Havlíčkův Brod (German Brod), Olomouc (Olmütz) and Brno (Brünn). They had moved into the Polish Kraków Voivodeship, the Western Carpathians and Transylvania (Siebenbürgen), introducing the practice of crop rotation and German town law.

=== Different visions of Mitteleuropa ===
In the first half of the 19th century, ideas of a Central-European federation between the Russian Empire and the West European great powers arose, based on geographical, ethnic and economic considerations. The term Mitteleuropa in the specific sense discussed in this article was used by Karl Ludwig von Bruck and Lorenz von Stein, a first theorization of the term attempted in 1848, with the aim of a series of interlocking economic confederations. However, plans advocated by the Austrian minister-president, Prince Felix of Schwarzenberg, foundered on the resistance of the German states. After the Austro-Prussian War of 1866 and the Prussian-led unification of Germany under Chancellor Otto von Bismarck in 1871, In Austria, the Mitteleuropa concept evolved as an alternative to the German question, equivalent to an amalgamation of the states of the German Confederation and the multi-ethnic Austrian Empire under the firm leadership of the Habsburg dynasty. After the Revolutions of 1848 liberal theorists like Friedrich List and Heinrich von Gagern, socialists and then later groups like the German National Liberal Party would adopt the idea. However, a distinct Pan-German notion accompanied by the concept of a renewed settler colonialism would become associated with the idea. In the German Empire, the Ostforschung concentrated on the achievements by ethnic Germans in Central Europe on the basis of ethnocentrism with significant anti-Slavic notions, as propagated by the Pan-German League. By 1914 and the Septemberprogramm, Mitteleuropa, meaning central Europe under the control of Germany, had become a part of German hegemonic policy.

=== Prussian Mitteleuropa plan ===
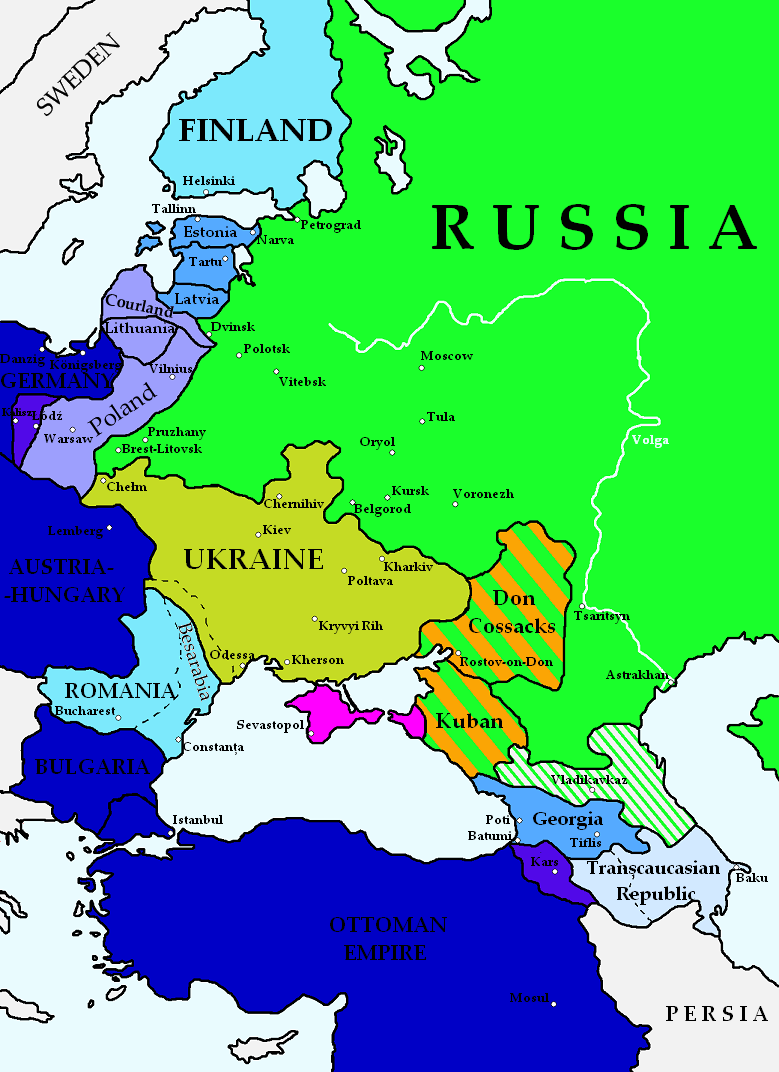
Alleged map of German plans for a new political order in Central and Eastern Europe after the Treaty of Brest-Litovsk of February 9, 1918, Treaty of Brest-Litovsk of March 3, 1918 and Treaty of Bucharest of May 7, 1918: Germany and its allies Areas of controlled by the Russian Empire to be annexed by Germany/Ottomans. Semi-autonomous states under full German control – planned annexation New countries – economically and administratively dependent on Germany Ukraine – under German economic control Planned Tatar Republic – area of German control Countries politically and economically tied with Germany Planned Transcaucasian Republic – politically tied with Germany Semi-autonomous Cossack states inside Russia – German sphere of influence

The Mitteleuropa plan was to achieve an economic and cultural hegemony over Central Europe by the German Empire and subsequent economic and financial exploitation of this region combined with direct annexations, making of puppet states, and the creation of puppet states for a buffer between Germany and Russia. The issue of Central Europe was taken by German politician Friedrich Naumann in 1915 in his work Mitteleuropa. According to his thought, this part of Europe was to become a politically and economically integrated bloc subjected to German rule. In his program, Naumann also supported programs of Germanization and Hungarization as well. In his book, Naumann used imperialist rhetoric combined with praises to nature, and imperial condescension towards non-German people, while advising politicians to show some "flexibility" towards non-German languages to achieve "harmony". Naumann wrote that it would stabilize the whole Central-European region. Some parts of the planning included designs on creating a new state in Crimea and have the Baltic states to be client states.

The ruling political elites of Germany accepted the Mitteleuropa plan during World War I while drawing out German war aims and plans for the new order of Europe. Mitteleuropa was to be created by establishing a series of puppet states whose political, economic and military aspects would be under the control of the German Reich. The entire region was to serve as an economic backyard of Germany, whose exploitation would enable the German sphere of influence to better compete against strategic rivals like Britain and the United States. Political, military and economic organization was to be based on German domination, with commercial treaties imposed on the newly-created states of Poland and Ukraine, working as German protectorates. It was believed that the German working classes could be appeased by German politicians through the economic benefits of territorial annexation, a new economic sphere of influence, and exploitation of conquered countries for the material benefit of Germany. Partial realization of these plans was reflected in the Treaty of Brest-Litovsk, where guarantees of economic and military domination over Ukraine by Germany were laid out. The Mitteleuropa plan was viewed as a threat by the British Empire, which concluded it would destroy British continental trade and diminish its military power.

=== Other visions of Mitteleuropa ===
While Mitteleuropa describes a geographical location, it also is the word denoting a political concept of a German-dominated and exploited Central European union that was put into motion during the First World War. The historian Jörg Brechtefeld describes Mitteleuropa as the following:

The term Mitteleuropa never has been merely a geographical term; it is also a political one, much as Europe, East and West are terms that political scientists employ as synonyms for political ideas or concepts. Traditionally, Mitteleuropa has been that part of Europa between East and West. As profane as this may sound, this is probably the most precise definition of Mitteleuropa available.

Mitteleuropean literature of the period between the end of the 19th century and World War II has been the subject of renewed interest, starting in the 1960s. Pioneers in this revival have been Claudio Magris, Roberto Calasso, and the Italian publishing house Adelphi. In the 1920s, French scholar Pierre Renouvin published eleven volumes of documents explaining that Germany decided to bail out Austria which they believed was threatened with economic disintegration by Serbian and other nationalist movements. J Keiger maintained in the debate on the Fischer Controversy that confirmed this opinion rebutting revisionist arguments that Germany was looking for an excuse to occupy Austro-Hungary.

German Chancellor Theobald von Bethmann Hollweg's plan prepared for a Central European Economic Union. Published in September 1914, the program for interdependent development was designed to include France in a Central European Customs Federation. The German occupation of Belgium was the first phase in this process, which ultimately failed to come to fruition. Plans to create a Duchy of Flanders and a Grand Duchy of Warsaw were discussed as political units of future "localized" administration. The original economic plan was conceived pre-1914 by Walther Rathenau and Alfred von Gwinner, respectively, with the legal support of Hans Delbrück. It was a Customs Union consistent with a history of the Zollverein and German Confederation of the 19th century, in which German philosophers believed in the wider sustainability of a Greater Europe. There were concerns from Schoenbeck and others that it would make Germany too inward-looking, but Mitteleuropa gained the support of von Hertling, later a Chancellor and Kurt Kuhlmann, the diplomat. The major sticking point was continued and exclusive German access to Austrian markets, while in the mind of others, like von Falkenhausen, mastery of competition was not possible before military mastery of Europe.

An extension of Mitteleuropa was the Longwy-Briey basin. Capturing this mining area west of Alsace-Lorraine, already annexed since 1871, was a major part of the Schlieffen Plan and Germany's war aims. The high plateau dominated the French interior, giving the German army a wide range of fire. But the area also contained immensely prized deposits of iron. These were essential to both France and German war efforts. The development of heavy industry was a central feature of economic policy "under Imperial Protective Administration." Initially, Roedern, the Reich treasurer, was deeply skeptical that a plan to "incorporate" French assets into a customs union and federation would succeed, but civilian doubts were overcome by January 1915, and by 26 August 1916, it was official German policy.

The first port of Mitteleuropa was Antwerp: Belgium's occupation in August 1914 was suggestive of partition. Anglophile Albert Ballin, therefore, set up a "German–Belgian trading company" to transfer assets and people from the occupied territories back to the Reich. The Post Office was to become German, and so too the railways, and the banks, all overseen by an Economics Committee, which would be a liaison group between private enterprise and the public sector. Belgian capital markets were absorbed into Karl von Lumm's Report, and all currency issued was backed by the Reichsbank. German obsession with the "Race to the Sea" and right to Belgian seaports continued to be a major policy initiative in the Memorandum of "Attachement" maritime security persisted in the German-Luxembourg Customs Association finally completed on 25 November 1915. Much of the theoretical work would be carried out by Six Economic Associations discussed in memoranda from Spring 1915 designated so as to set Germany free from British tutelage. Mitteleuropa also had its opponents inside Germany. Erich Marcks, a historian from Magdeburg and a member of SPD, had referred to "that great European idea" before the war. In March 1916, he urged the Chancellor to renew calls in the Reichstag for a public debate on the war's aims.

== See also ==
- Central Europe
- Lebensraum
- Drang nach Osten
- Geographical midpoint of Europe
- Germans of Romania
- Intermarium for a plan by Polish leaders after World War I to create a similar political structure across the same region, but for the benefit and security of Poland.
- Judeopolonia
- League of East European States
- Ober Ost for the governing authority that actually governed much of this region after Russian surrender in WWI
- Puppet state for a list of nations founded by Germany for the purpose of creating this block
- Ukrainian State for the Ukrainian government Germany supported for this purpose.
- Septemberprogramm, the closest the Germans came for a plan for Mitteleuropa.
- Maciej Górny: Concept of Mitteleuropa, in: 1914-1918-online. International Encyclopedia of the First World War.
