= Jüdische Humanitätsgesellschaft =

Zionist organisation to combat antisemitism

The Jüdische Humanitätsgesellschaft (Jewish Humanities Society) was a Zionist organisation founded in Germany in 1893 by Max Bodenheimer, Heinrich Loewe, and Max Oppenheimer.The organisation was created as a response to аntisemitism. The name that was chosen for the organisation was neutral because most of the German Jews opposed Zionism. It became a group for many future leaders in German Zionism. Members included Arthur Menachem Hantke. Because the organisation had not set any clear goals except that of Jewish self-awareness ("its name was as mysterious as its purpose"), it attracted many young students.

The organization joined with Jung Israel to form the Vereinigung Jüdischer Studierender, on 4 July 1895. The organization changed its name around the turn of the century to Verein Jüdischer Studenten an der Universität Berlin, and, with its sympathy for the ascending Zionist movement in Germany, can be regarded as a forerunner of the Kartell Jüdischer Verbindungen.
