= Jüdischer Friedhof Deutz =

Jewish cemetery in Cologne, Germany

Coordinates: 50°55′42″N 6°58′55″E

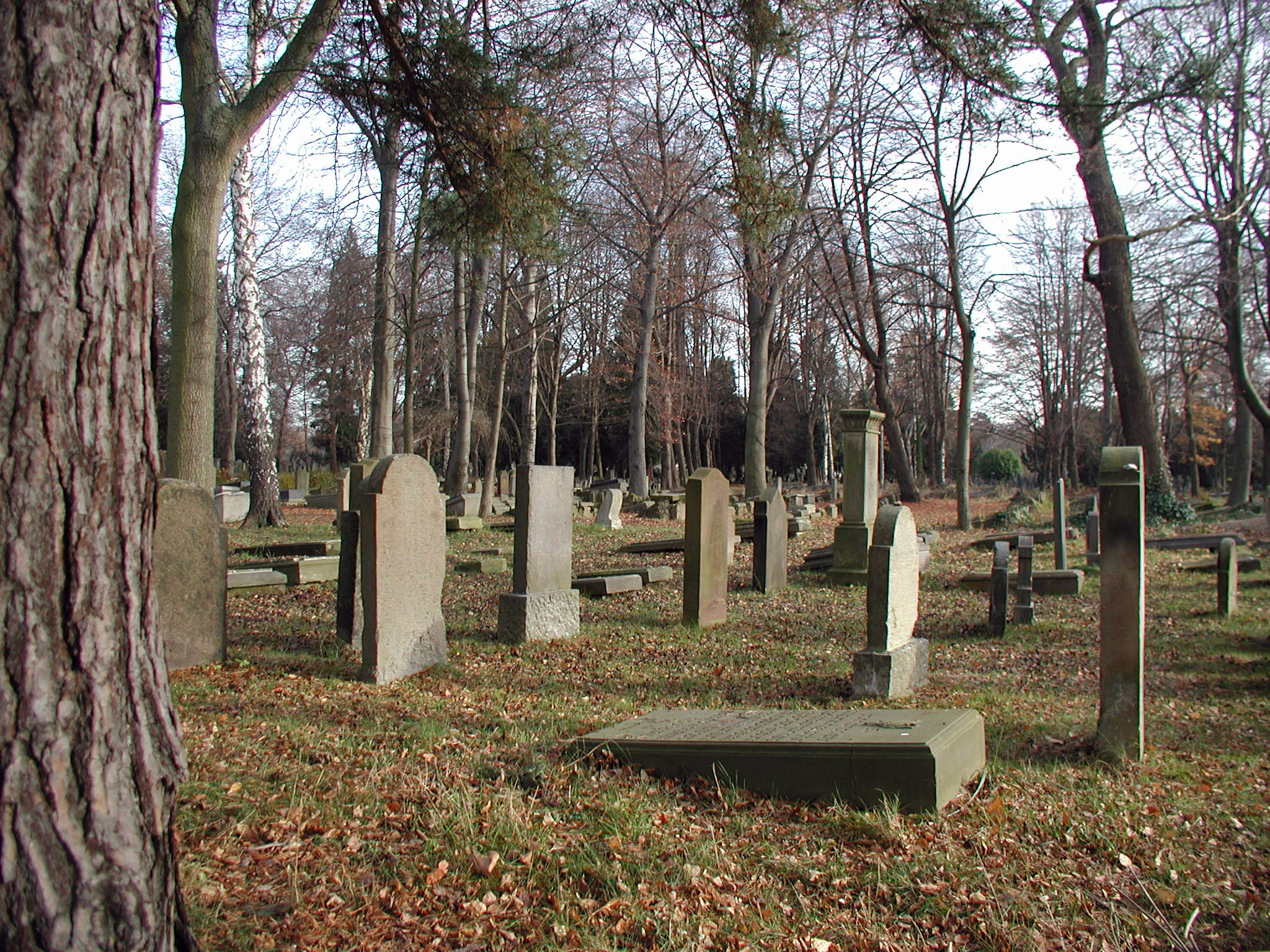

Jüdischer Friedhof Deutz is a cemetery in Cologne, Germany. Founded in 1695, it is the oldest Jewish cemetery in the district of Cologne. Last burial took place during the Second World War in 1941.
