= Andrzej Leszek Szcześniak =

Andrzej Leszek Szcześniak (November 29, 1932 – March 15, 2003) was a controversial Polish doctor of historical sciences, author of over thirty historical books and school textbooks. While he was praised for his research of the Katyn massacre, he was also accused of antisemitism.

== Research in Katyń massacre ==
Szcześniak was among the first who raised the issue of the Katyń massacre in the mid-1980s and published several books on the subject. In 2004, the Golgotha of the East Foundation, whose statute goal is the commemoration of the victims of the massacre, awarded him posthumously the "Golgotha of the East - Katyń 1940" Medal (Medal Golgoty Wschodu – Katyń 1940).

== Accusations of antisemitism ==
Szcześniak is known for reviving the conspiracy theory of Judeopolonia, authoring two volumes under this title, which present Jews as "informers and spies for the tsar, tightfisted hyenas and arrogant sassy people who oppress the Polish people."

Polish-Jewish journalist Anna Bikont writes that during the Communist times he had a near-monopoly on the history textbooks, but with the fall of Communism he switched the rhetoric in the textbooks from Communist to nationalist. She writes that she raised the issue of antisemitism in his textbooks in her articles Gazeta Wyborcza, which caused public protests by over 200 prominent people against using these textbooks in education, but an equally large group defended his textbooks for the "Polish values" in them. She cites him saying on the occasion of Jedwabne Massacre that "The hysteria around Jedwabne is aimed at shocking Poles and extracting sixty-five billion dollars from our people in the framework of the Holocaust business".

== Books ==
- Katyń: lista ofiar i zaginionych jeńców obozów Kozielsk, Ostaszków, Starobielsk, Alfa, Warsaw, 1989, ISBN 83-7001-294-9.
- Katyń: relacje, wspomnienia, publicystyka, Alfa, Warsaw, 1989, ISBN 83-7001-296-5.
- Katyń. Tło historyczne, fakty, dokumenty, Alfa, Warsaw, 1989, ISBN 83-7001-295-7.
- Wojna polsko-radziecka 1918-1920, Wyd. Ośrodka Dokumentacji i Studiów Społecznych, Warsaw, 1989, ISBN 83-7012-045-8.
- Zmowa. IV rozbiór Polski, Alfa, Warsaw, 1990, ISBN 83-7001-338-4.
- Judeopolonia. Żydowskie państwo w państwie polskim, Polskie Wydawnictwo Encyklopedyczne, Radom, 2001, ISBN 83-88822-07-1.
- Plan zagłady Słowian – Generalplan Ost, Polskie Wydawnictwo Encyklopedyczne, Radom, 2001,ISBN 83-88822-03-9.
- Holokaust. Wyd. Polskie Wydawnictwo Encyklopedyczne, Radom, 2001, ISBN 83-88822-09-8.
- Judeopolonia II - Anatomia Zniewolenia Polski, Polskie Wydawnictwo Encyklopedyczne, Radom, 2002, ISBN 83-88822-26-8.
- Deportacje w XX wieku, Polskie Wydawnictwo Encyklopedyczne, Radom, 2002, ISBN 83-88822-12-8.
- Katyńska zbrodnia, Polskie Wydawnictwo Encyklopedyczne Polwen, Radom, 2004, ISBN 83-89862-75-1
