= Judeopolonia =

Conspiracy theory positing future Jewish domination of Poland

- Rok 3333, czyli sen niesłychany (The Year 3333, or, a Monstrous Vision), which coined the expression "Judeopolonia"
- Context: Antisemitism in Poland
- Coined by: Julian Ursyn Niemcewicz
- Meaning: An antisemitic conspiracy theory postulating a Jewish intent to dominate Poland

Judeopolonia, also Judeo-Polonia, is an antisemitic trope positing a future Jewish domination of Poland. The idea had its roots in a book by Julian Ursyn Niemcewicz, published posthumously in 1858, but did not gain currency in subsequent antisemitic tracts until around 1900.

In 1912, Teodor Jeske-Choiński had Jews in his book say: "If you do not allow us to establish a 'Judeo-Polonia state' and a nation of 'Judeo-Polish people,' we will strangle you."

The Judeopolonia myth has been revived periodically in connection with the Bodenheimer plan for a League of East European States, notably by Andrzej Leszek Szczęśniak in his books Judeopolonia (2001) and Judeopolonia II (2002). Zoltán Halasi writes that Szczęśniak presents Jews as informers for the tsar, "tightfisted hyenas" and arrogant oppressors of the Polish people.

Szczęśniak gives the name "Judeopolonia" to a League of East European States, a German client state with autonomous Jewish cooperation, proposed in 1914 for the territory between Germany and Russia by the German Committee for Freeing of Russian Jews.

== See also ==
- Andinia Plan
- Israelization of Albania
- Mitteleuropa
- Żydokomuna
- Zionist Occupation Government conspiracy theory
