= Arthur Menachem Hantke =

Israeli jurist

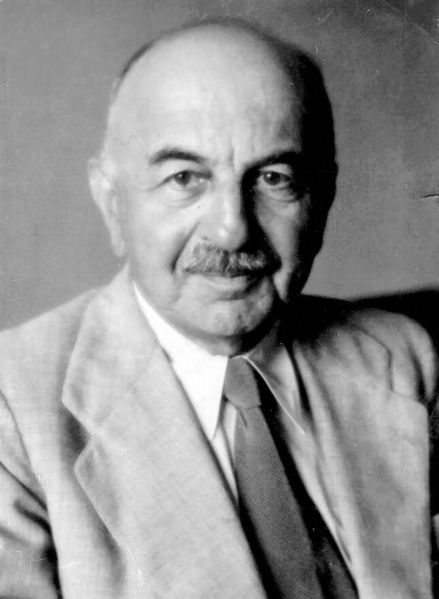
Arthur Hantke 1940

Arthur Menachem Hantke (March 5, 1874 – October 9, 1955) was a jurist, lawyer and economist, one of the leaders of Zionist movement in Germany and one of the leaders of the Zionist fundraising organization Keren Hayesod.

== Biography ==
Arthur Hantke was born in Berlin into a Jewish religious family from Posen, and received a traditional Jewish education. He studied at the Humboldt University of Berlin and the University of Freiburg, and graduated as a doctor of law. He opened his own law firm in 1900. From 1909 he was married to Edith née Heiman (died in Jerusalem in 1949) and was the father of Yonatan (Theodore) Hantke.

== Zionist activism ==
As a student he was influenced by Russian Jews and approached the Zionist idea, in 1893 he was among the founders of the Jewish Humanities Society (Jüdische Humanitätsgesellschaft), a national Jewish organization in Berlin. He later joined the Zionist Organization and from 1901 was a delegate to all Zionist congresses.

In 1903, he was elected to the board of directors of the Jewish National Fund, where he held until 1928. In 1910 he was appointed chairman of the Zionist Organization in Germany, a position he held until 1920. In 1911 he was elected to the Zionist Executive in Berlin.

With the outbreak of the First World War, he transferred with Otto Warburg the Zionist Executive to Copenhagen, which was neutral, and at the same time worked with the aid of the Jews of Eastern Europe who were under German occupation and with the Germans trying to influence the Turks not to destroy the Jewish community in Eretz Israel. He opposed the establishment of the Jewish Legion because he wanted the Zionists to remain neutral. He gladly accepted the Balfour Declaration and worked to receive parallel statements from the Central Powers.

Following the deportation of the Jewish population of Tel-Aviv and Jaffa during World War I by the Ottoman commander Djemal Pasha, Zionist support for the Entente grew. In an attempt to undermine the Entente's war effort, the German government attempted to elicit Zionist support. Hantke met with Ottokar Czernin, the foreign minister of Austria-Hungary, and received the following statement:

We appreciate the desire of the Jewish minority in countries where they have a strongly developed culture of their own, to pursue their own way of life and we are willing to give benevolent support to these aspirations ... With regard to the aspirations of Jewry, especially of the Zionists towards Palestine, we welcome the recent statement of Talaat Pasha, the Grand Vizier, as well as the intentions of the Ottoman Government, made in accordance with its traditional friendship towards the Jews in general, to promote a flourishing Jewish settlement in Palestine, in particular by means of unrestricted immigration and settlement within the absorptive capacity of the country; local self government in accordance with the country's laws, and the free development of their civilization.

— 5 January 1918 declaration by Freiherr Axel von dem Bussche-Haddenhausen

In 1919, he initiated the establishment of the Central Zionist Archives. With the establishment of Keren Hayesod, he was appointed head of the Fund's Central European Department. In 1926 he was appointed as a director of the Keren Hayesod and immigrated to Israel, where the Central Bureau of the Fund was located. In 1933 he was appointed to head Keren Hayesod. As part of his job, he was required to deal with the issue of the immigration of German Jews after the Nazis came to power.

== Death and legacy ==
Hantke died in 1955 in Jerusalem.

Even Menachem, a moshav in Northern Israel, is named for him, as are streets in Tel Aviv, Jerusalem, Haifa, Kiryat Motzkin, and Kiryat Bialik.
