= Marek Wierzbicki =

Polish historian

Marek Wierzbicki (1964–present) is a Polish historian. Current scouting activist, former member of the opposition related to the Solidarity movement. Professor and lecturer at the John Paul II Catholic University of Lublin (KUL). Member of the Political Studies Institute of the Polish Academy of Sciences (ISP PAN).
