= Maciej Szczęśniak =

Polish interdisciplinary artist (born 1989)

- Born: 1989 (age 36–37); Kraków
- Education: Jan Matejko Academy of Fine Arts, Academy of Fine Arts in Warsaw
- Known for: graphic arts photography video art sound art site-specific art
- Website: Home page

Maciej Szczęśniak (born 1989) is an interdisciplinary artist working with photography, video, sound, performance, painting, site-specific works and texts, vice-dean for student affairs at the Faculty of Media Art of the Academy of Fine Arts in Warsaw.

== Biography ==
In 2013, he graduated with a bachelor's degree from the Faculty of Intermedia at the Jan Matejko Academy of Fine Arts in Kraków (in the same year he received a scholarship from the Rector of the Academy of Fine Arts in Kraków for the best students), and in 2016 with a master's degree from the Faculty of Media Art at the Academy of Fine Arts in Warsaw. In 2018, he qualified for the Seismograf III young art review organized by Bunkier Sztuki. In 2020, he received a scholarship from the Minister of Culture and National Heritage. In 2024, he earned a doctoral degree from the Faculty of Art of the University of the Commission of National Education in Kraków under the supervision of Artur "Arti" Grabowski. He co-founded the Option Gallery in Kraków and the artistic groups Option and The Flutes. Together with Sara Piotrowska, he created the Piotrowska/Szczęśniak atelier (artist-run space). He began working as a primitivist tattooist and a lecturer at the Faculty of Media Art at the Academy of Fine Arts in Warsaw. He exhibited, among others, as part of Cracow Art Week Krakers (2018–2022).

== Exhibitions ==
=== Individual exhibitions ===
- Poczywczy, szorstki w obejściu, ze skłonnościami do autorytaryzmu, Bałtycka Galeria Sztuki Współczesnej, 2018
- Hiacynty pachną jak feta, Krakers, 2019
- Gentle Way, Automat Artspace, Saarbrücken, 2021
- Objects in the mirror are closer than they appear, Krakers, 2022
- Game of risk, „Nowy Złoty” Gallery, Wrocław, 2022
- Operacja na żywym ciele, LELE Art Space, Warszawa, 2022
- Biedny i szczęśliwy. Kondycja współczesnego artysty, ArtZona, Ośrodek Kultury Norwida, 2024

=== Group exhibitions ===
- Ciepłe, zimne i nieludzkie, BWA Sokół, Nowy Sącz, 2014
- Mimikra/Mimicry, Muzeum Etnograficzne w Warszawie, 2015
- A non existent object, Gallery 91, Centje, Czarnogóra, 2015
- Lektury, Galeria Salon Akademii, Warszawa, 2015
- The Artists, The Flutes, Zachęta – National Gallery of Art, 2016
- Widzimisię, Rondo Sztuki, 2017
- 12 minutes to symmetry, CLB Berlin, 2017
- Humanista nie wita dnia uśmiechem, 2020
- Pochwała przemijalności, 01 Gallery, 2020
- Show off, Matca artspace, Cluj-Napoca, 2020
- Peaks, Pics and Other Inconsistencies, Liptovska galeria Petra Michala Bohuna, Liptovský Mikuláš, 2021
- Festiwal Narracje, Gdańska Galeria Miejska, 2021
- Ultimate hits for apocalypse, galeria „Kiosk”, a part of Cracow Art Week, Kraków, 2022
- Footnote 19: No Medium, Biuro Wystawa, Fundacja Sztuki Nowoczesnej, Warszawa, 2019
- Via Carpatia, Galeria IMO, Stary Sącz, 2023

Source.

== Works for theatre ==
- Video for the show Śnieg, directed by Bartosz Szydłowski, Teatr Łaźnia Nowa, Kraków; 2022.
- Set design and costumes for the show Głos Ludzki, directed by Andrzej Chyra, Festiwal „Muzyka na Szczytach”, Zakopane; 2021.

== Awards ==
He was a laureate of the Szpilman Award (“Best six” distinction, 2014), the Rybie Oko 9 Young Art Biennale (2017), the award of the director of the Baltic Gallery of Contemporary Art in Słupsk (2017) and the second prize in the international competition "Zaszkodcenia/Apoptosis" organized by the Centre for Contemporary Art in Krakow (together with Sara Piotrowska, 2019).
