= German Committee for Freeing of Russian Jews =

World War I era group

The German Committee for the Freeing of Russian Jews (German, 'Deutsches Komitee zur Befreiung der russischen Juden') was created in August 1914 by Max Bodenheimer with Franz Oppenheimer, Adolf Friedman and Leo Motzkin to lobby for the socio-political liberation of Jewish people living in the Russian Empire and ensuring their protection from pogroms. In November 1914 it was renamed the Committee for the East.

The Committee was initially supported by the German Empire but, as no Jewish insurrection arose against the Russians, the Germans soon lost interest.
