= Max Bodenheimer =

German zionist & lawyer (1865–1940)

Max Isidor Bodenheimer
- מקס בודנהיימר
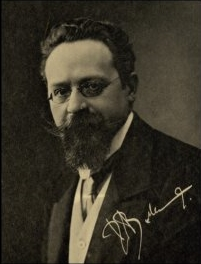
- Bodenheimer c. 1910
- Born: 12 March 1865; Stuttgart, Kingdom of Württemberg
- Died: 19 June 1940 (aged 75); Jerusalem, Mandatory Palestine
- Occupation: lawyer
- Spouse: Rosa Dalberg
- Children: Shimon Fritz Bodenheimer; Henriette Hannah Bodenheimer; Ruth Bodenheimer

Max Isidor Bodenheimer (Hebrew: מקס בודנהיימר; 12 March 1865 – 19 July 1940) was a lawyer and one of the main figures in German Zionism. An associate of Theodor Herzl, he was the first president of the Zionist Federation of Germany and one of the founders of the Jewish National Fund. After his flight in 1933 from Nazi Germany, and a short sojourn in Holland, he settled in Palestine in 1935.

== Biography ==
Max Bodenheimer was born on 12 March 1865 in Stuttgart to an assimilated Jewish family. He studied at Tübingen, Strassburg, Berlin and Freiburg universities from 1884 to 1889.

In 1890 he moved to Cologne to start a law practice. In 1891 he published his first Zionist article in the weekly "Die Menorah" (Hamburg). In Cologne he met David Wolffsohn and the two became close friends. Bodenheimer and Wolffsohn participated in various Zionist groups and activities in Cologne and also established a Zionist group named “Zion”. At that time Bodenheimer began correspondence with Theodor Herzl. In 1893 he helped found the Jüdische Humanitätsgesellschaft.

In 1896 he married Rosa Dalberg, with whom he had three children: Simon Fritz, a professor of zoology at the Hebrew University of Jerusalem, Henrietta Hannah, who wrote a biography of her father, and Ruth, a lawyer.

When Bodenheimer died, the national institutions flew flags at half staff and a eulogy was delivered by Ussishkin, president of the Jewish National Fund.

== Zionist activity ==
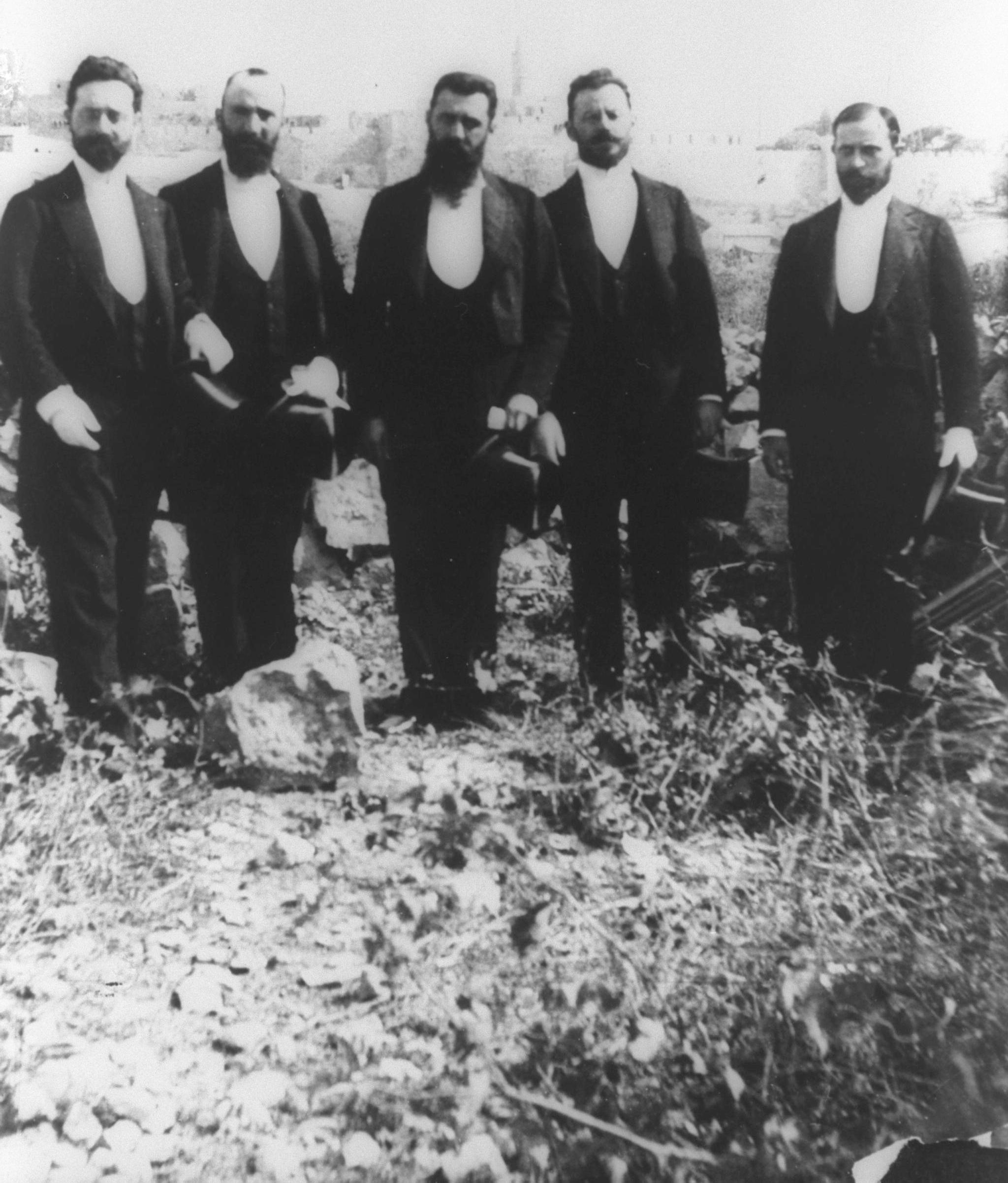
Zionist Delegation to Jerusalem, 2 November 1898. From left to right: Max Bodenheimer, David Wolffsohn, Theodor Herzl, Moses Schnirer, Joseph Seidener.

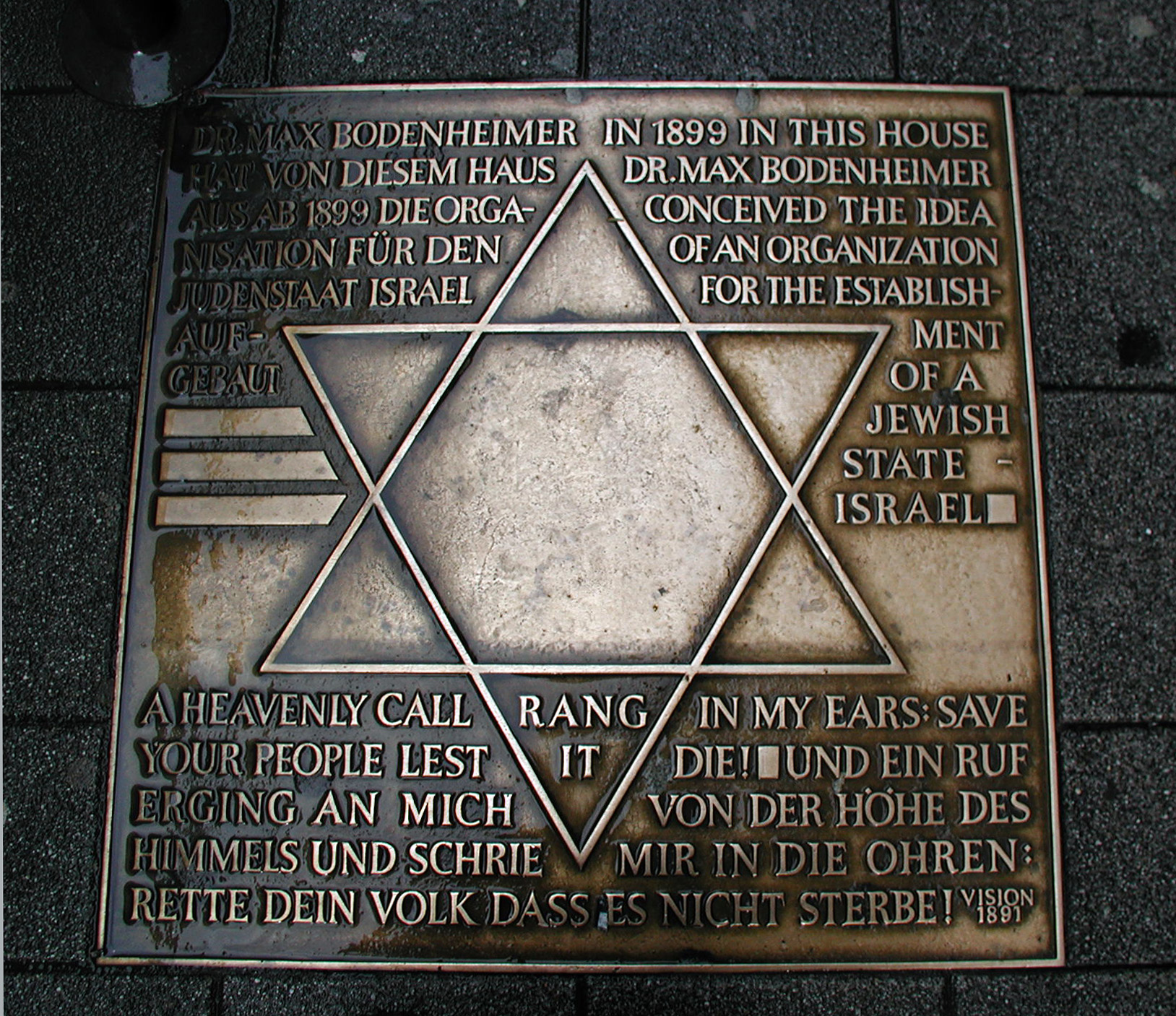
Plaque commemorating Max Bodenheimer

Bodenheimer participated at the 1st Zionist Congress and was elected to be a member of the Inner Actions Committee. In 1898 he visited Palestine as a member of the delegation which accompanied Herzl to meet the German Emperor, Wilhelm II. Bodenheimer took part in the Zionist Congresses, helped to write the constitution of the Zionist movement and the Jewish National Fund (JNF), and was the chairman of the board of directors of the JNF in Germany. When the First World War broke out, he moved the JNF offices from Cologne to The Hague.

It seems like he was the author of the conception of the establishment of the League of East European States - a German client state with autonomous Jewish cooperation, later referred also as Judeopolonia.

Like other veterans from the Herzl period, Bodenheimer's status declined after the First World War, and he was not re-elected as a member of the board of directors of the JNF. In August 1929, joins the Revisionist party led by Ze'ev Jabotinsky. Bodenheimer attended the 17th Zionist Congress as a representative of the Revisionist party. During the Congress, a sharp controversy arose between the majority and the Revisionist party concerning the "ultimate goal" of Zionism, and the Revisionists left the Congress. This was the last Zionist Congress in which Bodenheimer participated.

In 1935 Bodenheimer immigrated to Palestine and settled in Jerusalem, where he began writing his memoirs. He died in July 1940.

== Writings ==
- Prelude to Israel. The Memoirs of M. I. Bodenheimer. edited by Henriette Hannah Bodenheimer, New York, London, Thomas Yoseloff, 1963.
- Bodenheimer, Max I. and Bodenheimer, Henriette Hannah, Die Zionisten und das Kaiserliche Deutschland, Bensbert, Schaeube Verlag, 1972.
- M.I. Bodenheimer, So wurde Israel: Aus der Geschichte der zionistischen Bewegung: Erinnerungen (herausgegeben von Henriette Hannah Bodenheimer), Frankfurt a.M.: Europäische Verlagsanstalt, 1958.
- Syrien ein Zufluchtsort der russischen Juden. Hamburg, Verlag des Deutsch-Israelitischen Familienblattes 'Die Menorah', 1891.
- Max Bodenheimer (Bodmer): In Sachen Jesu. Ein jüdisches Theaterstück über Leben und Tod des Nazareners. Neu herausgegeben und mit einem Nachwort versehen von Nathanael Riemer. Würzburg: Könighausen & Neumann, 2024.
