= Michael C. Steinlauf =

American historian

Michael C. Steinlauf is Professor of History Emeritus at Gratz College, Pennsylvania. The son of Polish-Jewish Holocaust survivors, Steinlauf has taught Jewish history, theatre and culture in Eastern Europe as well as Polish-Jewish relations and is the author of numerous studies of Jewish culture in prewar Poland. He was one of the founders of the POLIN Museum of the History of Polish Jews in Warsaw. His work has been translated into Polish, Hebrew, German and Italian. He makes an appearance in the 1996 documentary, Shtetl, which tells the story of Poland's rural Jews before and during the Holocaust.

== Publications ==
- "Shakespeare on the American Yiddish Stage." American Jewish History, July 31, 2005
- Focusing on Jewish Popular Culture in Poland and Its Afterlife. Polin: Studies in Polish Jewry (16), Littman Library of Jewish Civilization, 2002. ISBN 1-874774-74-9. 628 pages
- Bondage to the Dead: Poland and the Memory of the Holocaust. Syracuse University Press, 1997. ISBN 0-8156-2729-7. 189 pages.
- "Poland." In: David S. Wyman, Charles H. Rosenzveig. The World Reacts to the Holocaust. The Johns Hopkins University Press, 1996. ISBN 0-8018-4969-1. Between pages 81 and 155
- "Beyond the evil empire: Freedom to remember or freedom to forget?" Sol Feinstone, 1991
- This Was Not America: A Wrangle Through Jewish-Polish-American History (Academic Studies Press) 2022. 188 pages.
