= Michael Brenner (historian) =

German historian

Michael Brenner (born 4 January 1964) is a German historian who researches and publishes on the history of Jews and Israel. Brenner has authored eight books on Jewish history, which were translated into twelve languages and is the editor and co-editor of eighteen books. He holds teaching positions at both LMU Munich and the American University.

== Early life and education ==
Brenner was born in Weiden. He studied at the university and the Hochschule für Jüdische Studien in Heidelberg, the Hebrew University of Jerusalem and Columbia University in New York. He wrote his dissertation at Columbia University on Jewish culture in the Weimar Republic.

== Career ==
From 1993 to 1994 Brenner was an assistant professor at Indiana University in Bloomington and from 1994 until 1997 at Brandeis University. Since 1997, he has taught as the chair for Jewish History and Culture at LMU Munich. Since 2013, he has also been the Seymour and Lillian Abensohn Chair in Israel Studies at the American University, Washington D.C. He has been visiting professor at numerous universities, among them Berkeley, Stanford, Johns Hopkins, Haifa, Central European University Budapest, and ETH Zürich.

Brenner, who frequently takes positions on public issues, is a proponent of a Muslim for the office of Federal President. In 2016, he advocated the publicist Navid Kermani, whom he described as the "most interesting voice in Germany". He is also considered a prominent critic of the party "Alternative for Germany" (AfD), against which he has repeatedly spoken out.

In 2023, Brenner was appointed by Federal Minister of the Interior Nancy Faeser as member of an eight-person commission to re-appraise the attack on Israeli athletes and team members at the 1972 Summer Olympics to answer unresolved questions.

== Honors and awards ==
In 1981, Michael Brenner won the first prize of the German-wide Federal President's History Competition among 13,000 competitors.

From 1998 to 2009 Brenner was chair of the academic board of the Wissenschaftliche Arbeitsgemeinschaft des Leo Baeck Instituts in Germany. In 2013 he was appointed International President of the Leo Baeck Institute International. Since 2009 he has been elected fellow of the Bavarian Academy of Sciences and Humanities, since 2012 of the Accademia Nazionale Virgiliana in Mantua, and since 2014 of the American Academy of Jewish Research. On 20 November 2014 German Minister of Justice Heiko Maas awarded Brenner with the highest decoration in Germany, the Federal Cross of Merit during a ceremony at the Leo Baeck Institute, New York On 7 December 2020 The Knapp Family Foundation and the University of Vienna announced the establishment of the Salo W. and Jeannette M. Baron Award for Scholarly Excellence in Research on the Jewish Experience with the award going to Brenner as the first Senior Laureate citing his scholarly work and lived experience bridging the US and Europe.

== Selection of publications in English ==
=== As author ===
- Brenner, Michael (2018). In Search of Israel. Princeton University Press. ISBN 978-0691203973.
- — (2012). Zionism: A Brief History. Marcus Wiener.
- — (2010). A Short History of the Jews. Princeton University Press. ISBN 9780691143514.
- — (2010). Prophets of the Past: Interpreters of Jewish History. Princeton University Press.
- — (1996). The Renaissance of Jewish Culture in Weimar Germany. Yale University Press.
- — (1997). German-Jewish History in Modern Times, vol. 2. Columbia University Press.(as co-author, Awarded with National Jewish Book Award for Jewish History 1997)
- — (1997). After the Holocaust: Rebuilding Jewish Lives in Postwar Germany. Princeton University Press.

=== As editor ===
- Brenner, Michael, ed. (2015). Jews and Muslims in the Russian Empire and the Soviet Union. Göttingen: Vandenhoeck&Ruprecht. (with Franziska Davies und Martin Schulze-Wessel)
- —, ed. (2008). Mediating Modernity. Challenges and Trends in the Jewish Encounter with the Modern World. Detroit: Wayne State University. (with Lauren B. Strauss)
- —, ed. (2006). Emancipation Through Muscles: Jews and Sports in Europe. Lincoln: Nebraska University Press. (with Gideon Reuveni)
- —, ed. (2003). Jewish Emancipation Reconsidered: The French and German Models. Tübingen: Mohr-Siebeck. (with Vicki Caron and Uri R. Kaufmann)
- —, ed. (1999). Two Nations: British and German Jews in Comparative Perspective. Tübingen: Mohr-Siebeck. (with Rainer Liedtke and David Rechter)
- —, ed. (1998). In Search of Jewish Community: Jewish Identities in Germany and Austria, 1918-1933. Bloomington: Indiana University Press. (with Derek Penslar)

== Links ==
- American University faculty page
