= Leo Baeck Institute Jerusalem =

Israeli research institute

- Formation: 1955; 71 years ago
- Type: Research institute
- Location: 33 Bustenai Street, Jerusalem, Israel
- Chairman: Prof. Guy Miron
- Affiliations: Leo Baeck Institute, Leo Baeck Institute New York, Leo Baeck Institute London
- Website: www.leobaeck.org

The Leo Baeck Institute Jerusalem for the Study of German and Central European Jewry, founded in 1955, is a research institute based in Jerusalem, Israel. While affiliated with the Leo Baeck Institute and its affiliates in New York/Berlin (Leo Baeck Institute New York) and London (Leo Baeck Institute London), it is an independent organization under Israeli law. Since 2026, the institute has been led by Prof. Guy Miron.

The Leo Baeck Institute Jerusalem activities are focused on the promotion of research, an ongoing cultural program, and archival documentation. The institute publishes a bi-annual journal called "Chidushim" (חידושים - "innovations"), which publishes articles about the history of central-european Jewry.

== History ==
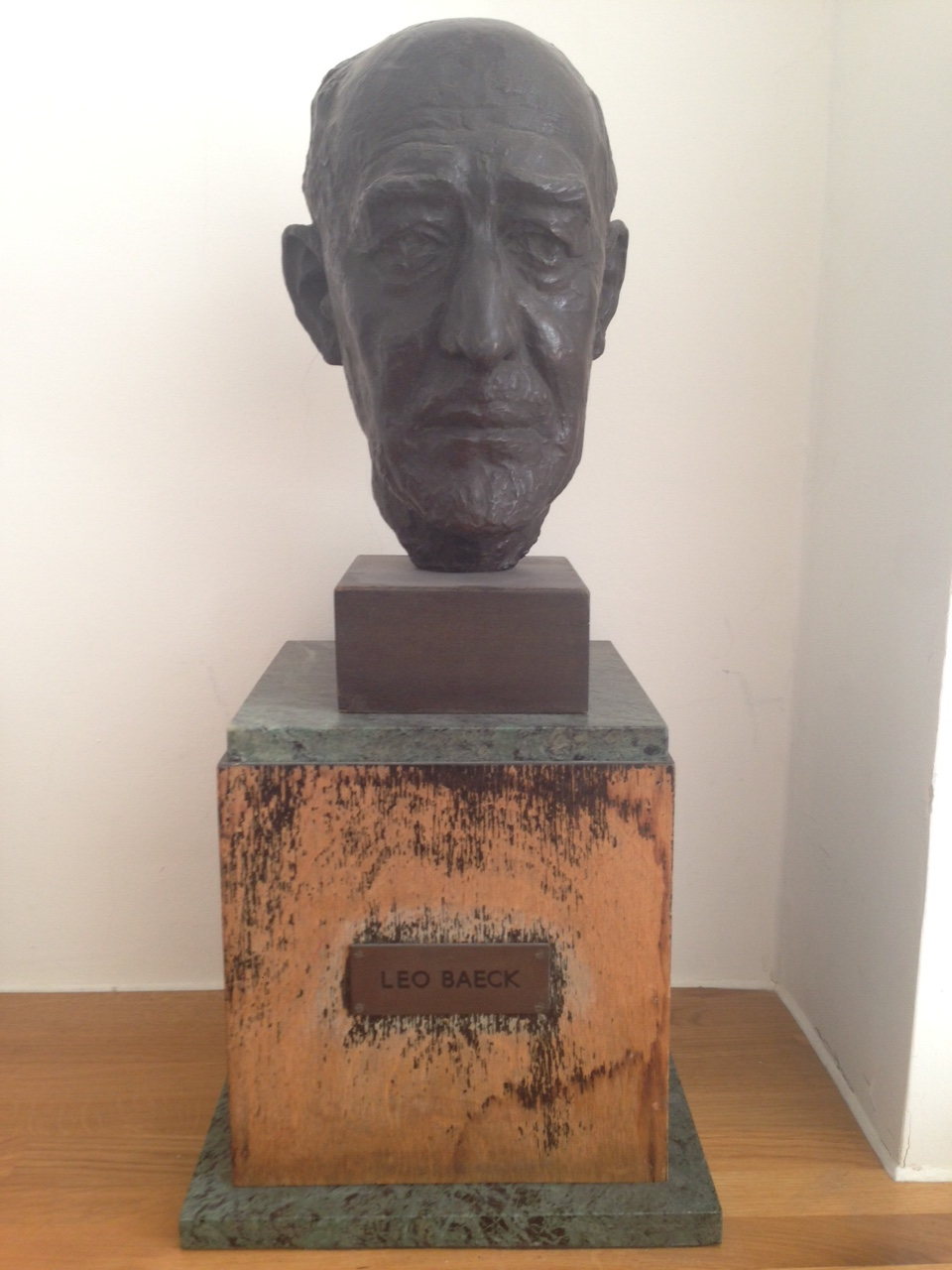
Bust of Leo Baeck

As the second generation took over, the LBI Jerusalem transformed from a memorial community to a research centre. Almost all members of the LBI Jerusalem’s second generation were professional historians; most had left Germany as children or adolescents and had either little of no share at all in the founders memories. For this reason the “memorial function” of the historiography now lost significance. In its place came more strictly scholarly aspirations.

Through their publications, scholarly seminars, academic and cultural events, alongside an archive, the Leo Baeck Institute Jerusalem has been the leading venue for German-Jewish historiography and documentation in Israel. Its archives consist of a microfilm collection of Jewish newspapers from the 19th and 20th centuries as well as a collection of family papers, genealogical materials and community histories.

== Leadership ==
Chairpersons of Leo Baeck Institute, Jerusalem, have been:

- 1956–1979: Hans Tramer
- 1981–1992: Jacob Katz
- 1993–1994: Josef Walk
- 1995–1997: Avraham Barkai
- 1997–2003: Robert Liberles
- 2003–2007: Zvi Bacharach
- 2008–2019: Shmuel Feiner
- 2019-2026: Galili Shaḥar
- 2026-present: Guy Miron
