= Maxim Sakachansky =

Maxim Sakachansky (born Meir Sakachansky; 27 March 1885 in Mogilev Governorate – 8 July 1952 in Tel Aviv) was a German-Israeli Yiddish singer and actor.

== Biography ==
He was born into the family of a timber merchant. After finishing cheder and yeshiva in Orsha, after the pogroms in 1905 he went to Switzerland and then to Riga, where, during 1928 to 1929 served in the theater of comedy and operetta. In 1929 he was in Berlin, where he became known as a performer of Jewish folk songs.

In 1930 he founded the Jewish Zakashansky literary cabaret "Lapserdak" (it. Kaftan), «one of the best Berlin cabaret[s], original and bizarre", where he performed together with Ruth Klinger, who in 1931 became his wife. The couple also toured a lot, both in Germany (visiting more than thirty cities), as well as in Czechoslovakia, where Klinger was born. After the advent of the Nazis to power in 1933, the cabaret was closed. Zakashansky and Klinger and emigrated to Palestine; an archive of theatrical and concert activity of Zakashanskogo relating to the Berlin period survived and is stored in the Leo Baeck Institute (Center for Jewish History) in New York.
