= Leo Baeck Institute London =

UK research institute

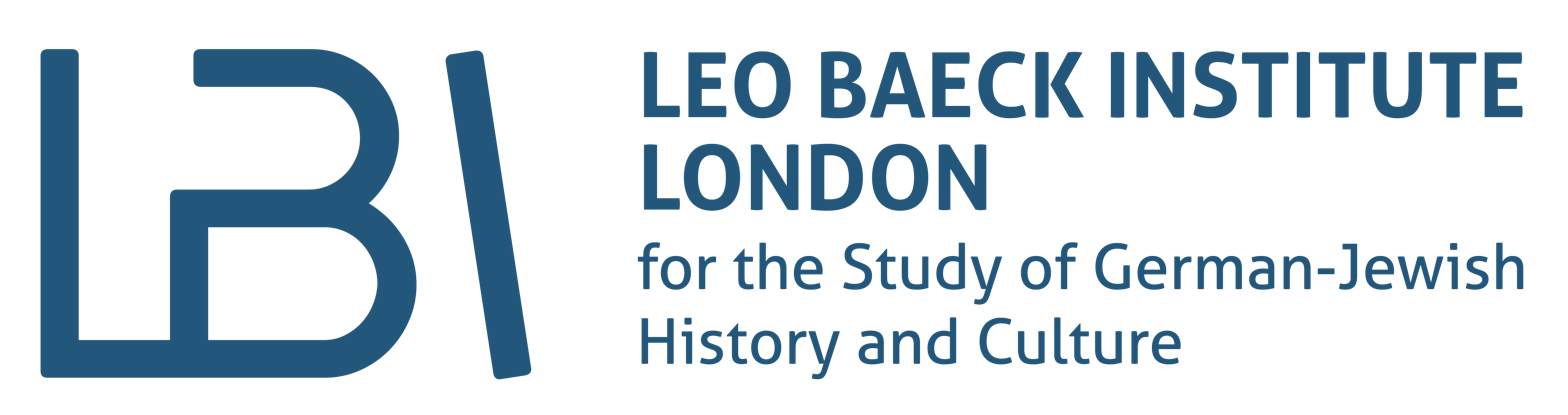
- Formation: 1955; 71 years ago
- Type: Research institute
- Legal status: registered charity
- Location: Senate House, Bloomsbury, London WC1E 7HU
- Director: Joseph Cronin
- Affiliations: Leo Baeck Institute, Leo Baeck Institute New York, Leo Baeck Institute Jerusalem
- Website: www.lbilondon.ac.uk

The Leo Baeck Institute London is a research institute dedicated to the study of German-Jewish history, politics and culture, founded in 1955. It belongs to the international Leo Baeck Institute with further research centres in New York City, Berlin and Jerusalem.

The LBI London researches the history and culture of German-speaking Jewry from the 17th century to the present day. The institute aims both to facilitate academic exchange and to use the German and Central European Jewish experience from the 17th to the 21st centuries to help understand contemporary socio-political debates concerning immigration, minorities, integration, and civil rights, in particular in the UK.

Since 2025, the institute is located at Senate House in Bloomsbury, central London. Between 2011 and 2024, it was located on the grounds of Queen Mary, University of London, where it established European Jewish History as a teaching and research field at the university's School of History.

The LBI London remains an independent institute and is a registered charity under English law.

== History ==
The Leo Baeck Institute was founded in 1955 by some of the most prominent Jewish scholars, including Hannah Arendt, Martin Buber, Ernst Simon and Gershom Sholem. Three international Branches, including the Leo Baeck Institute London, were initially founded. Upon the institute's inauguration, its members began undertaking research projects to fill in the history of German-speaking Jewry from the 17th century onward.

The institute is named after Leo Baeck, the senior Rabbi of Berlin during the Weimar Republic and the last Jewish community leader under the Nazis.

== Publications ==
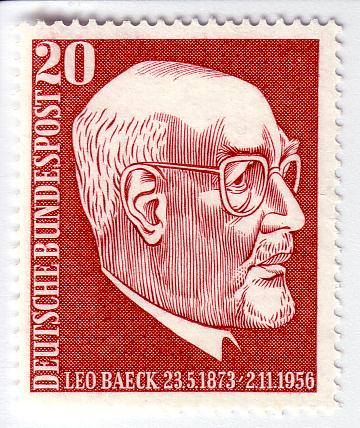
Commemorative stamp of Leo Baeck

The Institute's flagship publication, the Leo Baeck Institute Year Book (since 1956), is the leading international journal in the field of the history and culture of German-speaking Jews. Published by Oxford University Press and having a circulation of over 2,000 copies, it includes original research on the cultural, economic, political, social and religious history of German-speaking Jews. The Leo Baeck Institute Year Book Essay Prize is awarded annually to an early-career researcher writing on the history or culture of German-speaking Jewry.

In addition to its Year Book, the Institute publishes monographs and edited volumes in German and English. Its two series, Schriftenreihe wissenschaftlicher Abhandlungen des Leo Baeck Instituts, in German, and German Jewish Cultures, in English, cover the period from the Enlightenment to the contemporary era with a special focus on European Jewish history.

== Academic programmes and events ==
The Institute organises a range of events, such as international conferences and a public programme of lectures and workshops, often in collaboration with other UK or international organisations. Events are aimed at a broad audience. A Leo Baeck Fellowship Programme, in collaboration with the Studienstiftung des deutschen Volkes, was created in 2005 to support doctoral candidates in German-Jewish studies. The programme includes bi-annual seminars during which Fellows discuss their research with senior academics in the field. Up to 12 fellowships are awarded each year.

In collaboration with Queen Mary University of London, the Institute offers the Leo Baeck Institute MA in European Jewish History, currently the only postgraduate programme in the UK focusing on the field of European Jewish history. Among other topics, the programme explores the question of emancipation, equal rights, identities, the role of antisemitism, and Jewish intellectual history. The Institute also offers MA and PhD bursaries to support students on this course.

== Leadership ==
Directors and chairpersons of Leo Baeck Institute, London, have been:

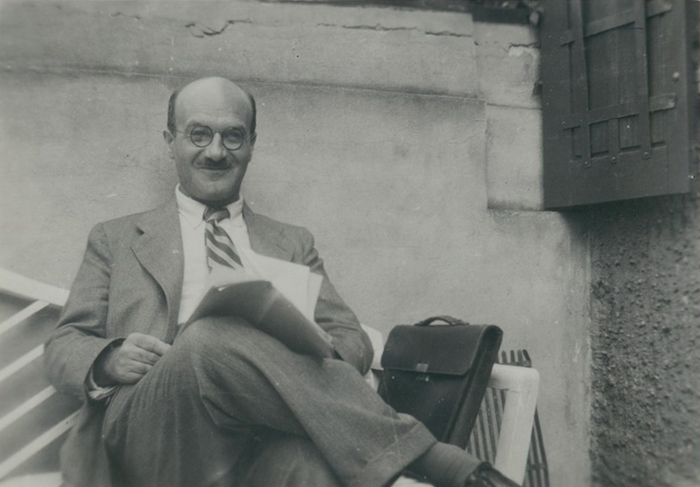
Robert Weltsch

- Robert Weltsch
- Werner E. Mosse
- Peter Pulzer
- Arnold Paucker
- Raphael Gross
- Sander Gilman
- Daniel Wildmann
- Joseph Cronin

== LBI London Lecture Series ==
Since 2016, the Leo Baeck Institute London holds an annual series of lectures in cooperation with the German Historical Institute London.

- 2016/17: The Legacy of the Left and Israel: 1967–2017 (Brian Klug, Christina Späti, Michel Dreyfus, Jan Gerber, Nick Cohen, David Feldman and Peter Ullrich)
- 2017/18: The Difficulties of Writing Family History (Lisa Appegnanesi, Thomas Harding, Atina Grossmann, Martin Doerry, Philippe Sands and Katrin Himmler)
- 2018/19: Seeing Jews in Art: Networks, Fantasies and Dreams (Katrin Kogman-Appel, Ruth Oren, Cilly Kugelman, Richard I. Cohen, Nathan Abrams).
- 2019/20: Acting Jewish: Between Identity and Attire (Henry Bial, Kerry Wallach, Adi Heyman, Paul Herzberg, Svenja Bethke)
- 2021: Conceptions of Heimat in Jewish Visual History and Culture ( Jan-Christopher Horak, Ofer Ashkenazi, Natasha Gordinsky, Katja Petrowskaja, Sarah McDougall)
- 2022: Popular Culture, Politics and Jews (Sonia Gollance, Hanno Loewy, Lisa Schoß, Moshe Zimmermann, Tobias Ebbrecht-Hartmann)
- 2023: The Good, the Bad and the Ugly: Myths, Images and Imaginings about Jews (Cathy Gelbin, Nadia Valman, Sara Lipton, Daniel Magilow, Sarah Lightman)

== Conferences, workshops and panel discussions ==
- 2016: Mein Kampf Today: Ideology, Memory and the Question of Censorship (panel discussion in collaboration with the Pears Institute for the Study of Antisemitism)
- 2017: Cosmopolitanism: Jewish and Postcolonial Perspectives (panel discussion in collaboration with the Pears Institute for the Study of Antisemitism)
- 2017: Arno Paucker – Scholar and Friend (memorial event in collaboration with the German Historical Institute London)
- 2018: Emotions and Experiences: Photography and Visual German-Jewish History, 1910-1950 (conference in collaboration with the University of Göttingen and the University of Nottingham.
- 2019: Jews and Jewish Religion in Western Postwar Fiction Film (conference in collaboration with the University of Göttingen and the Institute for the History of German Jews)
- 2019: Judenmord: Art and the Holocaust in Post-War Germany (book launch in collaboration with the Institute of Advanced Studies at University College London)
- 2019: Mosse's Europe: New Perspectives in the History of German Judaism, Fascism and Sexuality (conference in collaboration with the University of Wisconsin–Madison and the Deutsches Historisches Museum)
- 2019: Networks of Knowledge (exhibition in collaboration with Queen Mary, University of London)
- 2021: Philanthropist, Rescuer, Collector: Remembering Wilfrid Israel (panel in cooperation with the LBI Jerusalem, the Institute for the History of German Jews Hamburg, Goethe Institute and the Warburg Archive Foundation)
- 2021: (Re-)Collections – Jewish Archives and Cultural Memory (workshop in collaboration with the University of Goettingen)
- 2022: A New Look at German-Jewish History through Photography (conference in collaboration with the German Historical Institute London and the Hebrew University of Jerusalem)
- 2022: Images of the Grotesque and Arabesque: The Discovery of Kafka's drawings (discussion in collaboration with the German Historical Institute London)
- 2023: The Shoah and the Tragedy of Assimilation: Lessons from one German-Jewish family (Biennial LBI lecture)
- 2024: Who was Fritz Kittel? A German Railway Worker Decides, 1933–2022 (lecture in collaboration with the Goethe Institut London)

== See also ==
- Leo Baeck College
- Leo Baeck Institute (international)
