= Yeshiva University Museum =

Jewish cultural museum in New York City

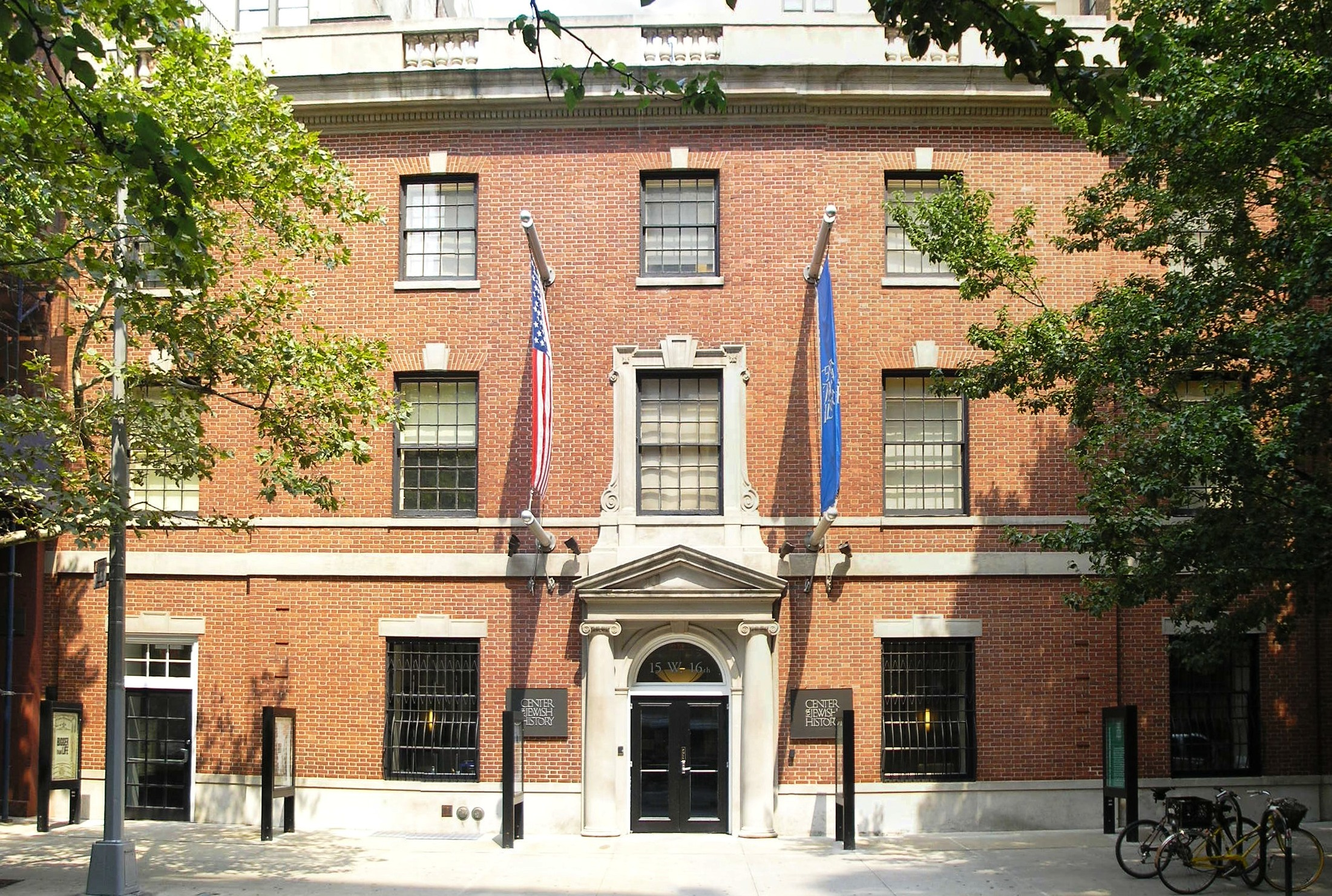
- The Yeshiva University Museum in the Center for Jewish History on 16th Street in Manhattan

- Location within New York City
- Location: 15 West 16th Street, New York City, New York
- Coordinates: 40.738056°N 73.993889°W
- Public transit access: Subway: at 14th Street–Union Square
- Website: www.yumuseum.org

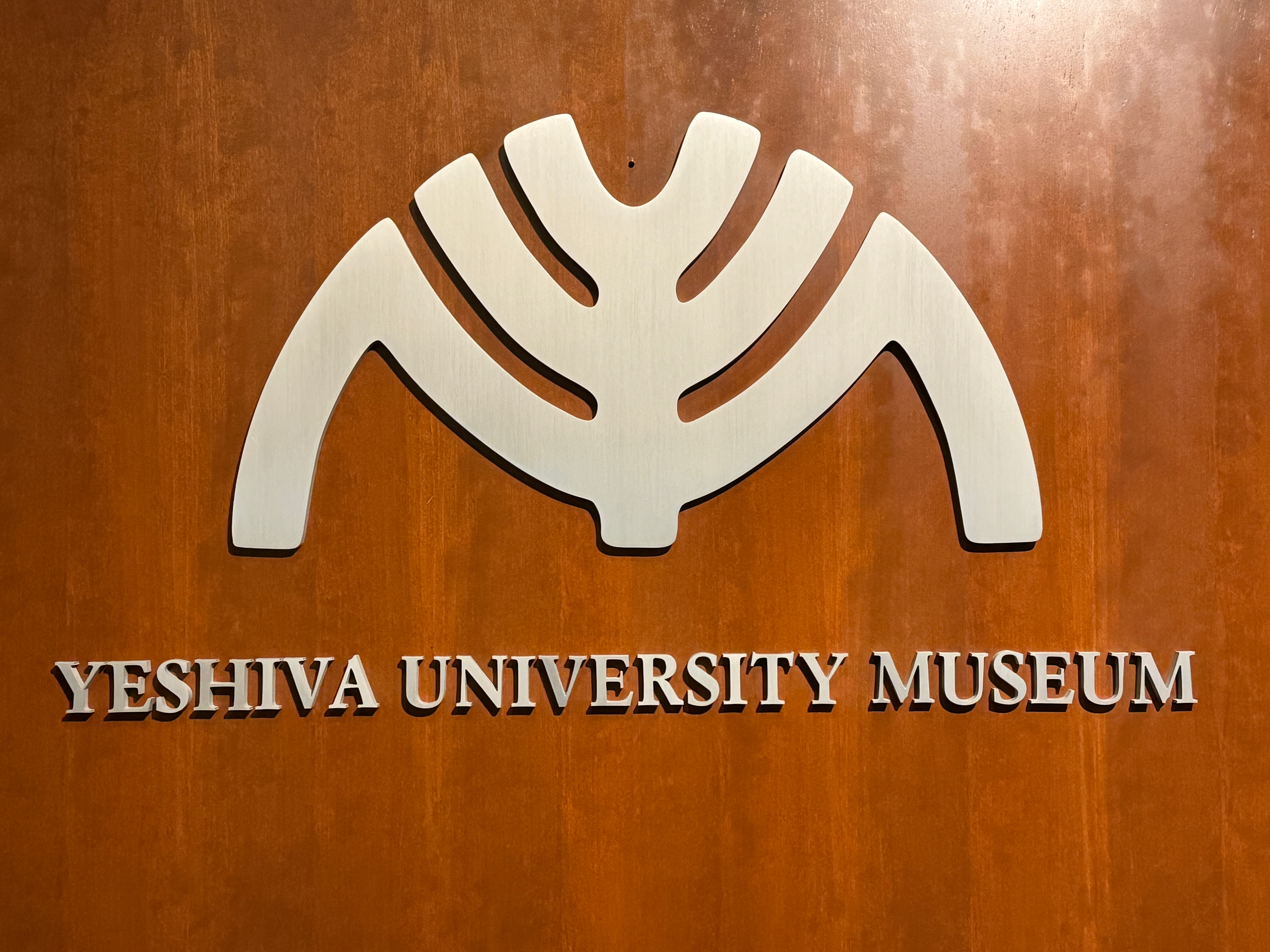
American Sephardi Federation

The Yeshiva University Museum is a teaching museum and the cultural arm of Yeshiva University. Along with the American Jewish Historical Society, the American Sephardi Federation, the Leo Baeck Institute, New York, and the YIVO Institute for Jewish Research, it is a member organization of the Center for Jewish History, a Smithsonian Institution affiliate located in the Chelsea neighborhood of Manhattan.

== History and mission ==
The museum was founded in 1973 and was located in the Mendel Gottesman Library on the University's Washington Heights campus, until it became a partner of the Center for Jewish History in 2000. Its mission is to celebrate the culturally diverse intellectual and artistic achievements of 3,000 years of Jewish experience. The museum aims to provide a window into Jewish culture around the world and throughout history through multi-disciplinary exhibitions and publications. Following the retirement of Sylvia A. Herskowitz, Dr. Jacob Wisse was appointed the museum’s director on February 26, 2009.

== Collection ==
The museum’s collection of more than 8,000 artifacts includes fine and folk art, ethnographic and archaeological artifacts, clothing and textiles, Jewish ceremonial art objects, documents, books, and manuscripts.

Highlights of the collection include:

- Archaeological artifacts dating from the Bronze Age to Late Antiquity
- Historic illuminated manuscripts such as one from 1478 recording the Simon of Trent blood libel trial
- Thomas Jefferson's handwritten letter of 1818 affirming religious freedom and denouncing anti-Semitism
- The Torah scroll and tefillin purported to belong to the Baal Shem Tov, founder of the Hasidic movement
- A model of Herod's Temple by Leen Ritmeyer

Yeshiva University Museum’s holdings embrace several significant collections of Jewish art and material culture, including:

- Models of historic synagogues commissioned for the museum’s founding
- Meyerhoff Collection of Early Israeli Art
- Jean Moldovan Collection of Jewish Children’s books
- Raphael Patai Amulet Collection
- Max Stern Collection of Judaica
- "Aishet Hayil: Woman of Valor" from the Book of Proverbs by Siri Berg

== Facilities and programs ==
The museum consists of four galleries, an exhibition arcade, an outdoor sculpture garden, a docent lounge, a children’s workshop room, and a suite of offices. Other Center for Jewish History facilities include a 250-seat handicapped-accessible auditorium and projection room, meeting rooms, a lunchroom, and a kosher café.

The museum produces two types of exhibitions, usually shown concurrently: one examining a Jewish community or historic event, and the other featuring contemporary artists working on Jewish themes. The museum occasionally presents traveling exhibitions. Other offerings include family craft workshops, lectures, films, concerts, and multilingual exhibition tours in English, Hebrew, Spanish, Russian, and Yiddish.

The Yeshiva University Museum’s outreach programs work with New York City public schools to provide students with art education and teachers with professional development. The New York State Council on the Arts, Project Arts of the New York City Board of Education, and the bilingual education program Title VII support these programs. A founding member of the Council of American Jewish Museums, Yeshiva University Museum plays a leading role in encouraging the growth of emerging museums and in developing conservation and preservation techniques for all Jewish museums.

== Awards ==
- 1981: National Jewish Book Award in the Visual Arts category for Purim: The Face and the Mask

== See also ==
List of university art museums and galleries in New York State
