= Leo Baeck Institute New York =

Research library and archive in New York

Leo Baeck Institute
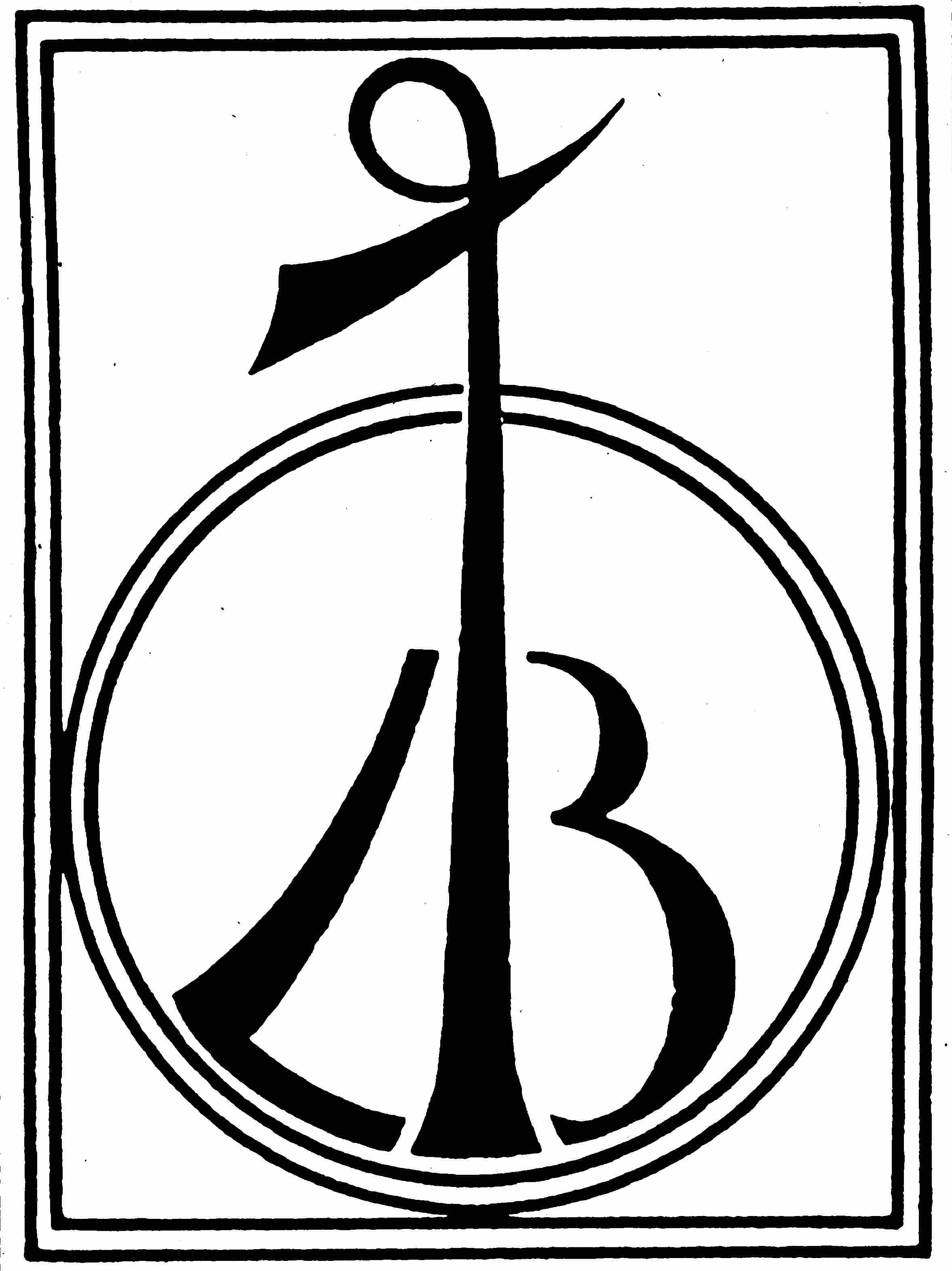

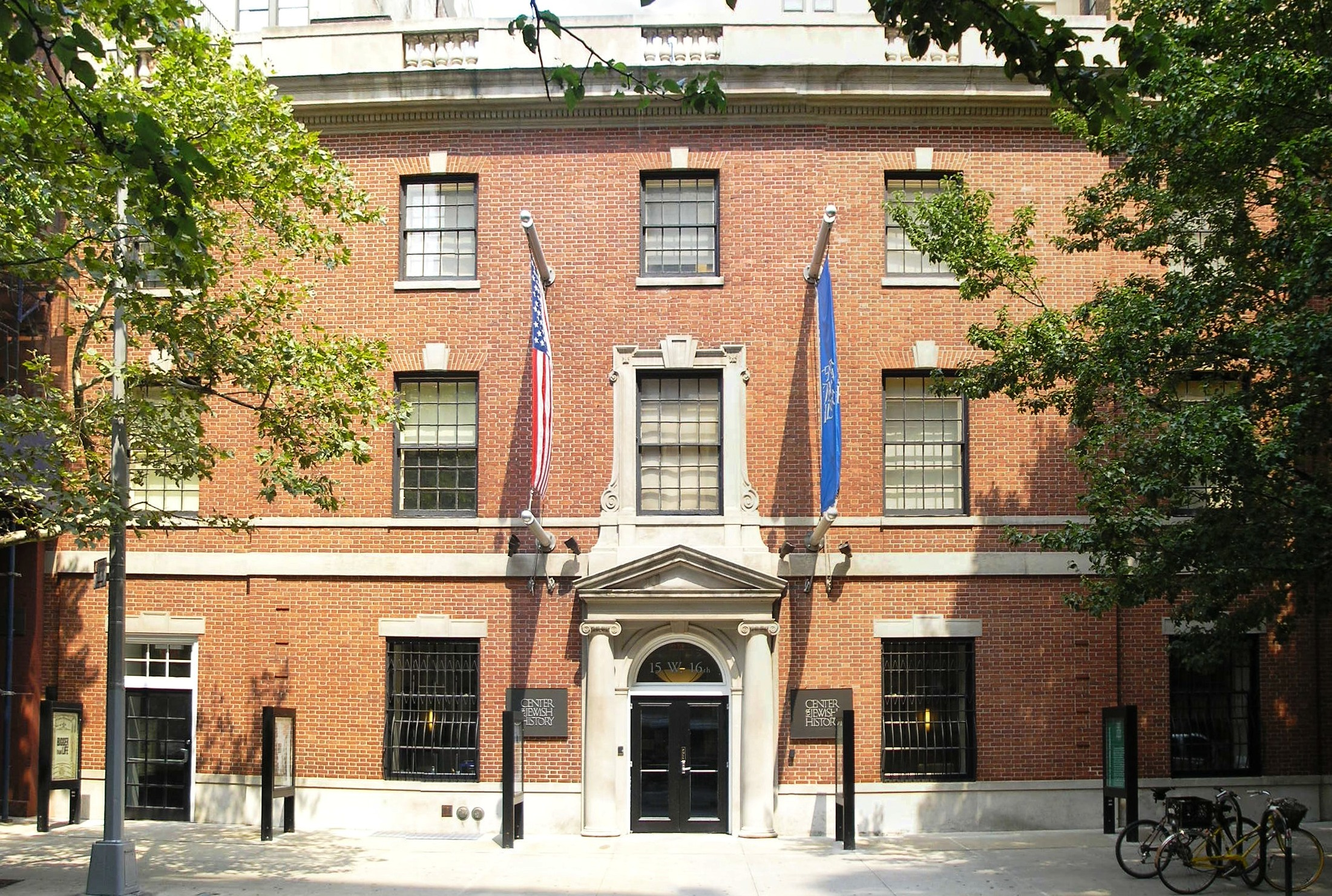
- The Leo Baeck Institute in the Center for Jewish History on West 16th Street in Manhattan

- Location within New York City
- Established: 1955; 71 years ago
- Location: 15 West 16th Street; New York City, New York
- Coordinates: 40.738056°N 73.993889°W
- Type: Research institute
- Executive director: Dr. William Weitzer
- President: David G. Marwell
- Historian: Dr. Frank Mecklenburg
- Public transit access: Subway: 14th Street – Union Square
- Website: www.lbi.org

The Leo Baeck Institute New York (LBI) is a research institute in New York City dedicated to the study of German-Jewish history and culture, founded in 1955. It is one of three independent research centers founded by a group of German-speaking Jewish émigrés at a conference in Jerusalem in 1955. The other Leo Baeck institutes are Leo Baeck Institute Jerusalem and Leo Baeck Institute London, and the activities of all three are coordinated by the board of directors of the Leo Baeck Institute. It is also a founding partner of the Center for Jewish History, and maintains a research library and archive in New York City that contains a significant collection of source material relating to the history of German-speaking Jewry, from its origins to the Holocaust, and continuing to the present day. The Leo Baeck Medal has been awarded by the institute since 1978 to those who have helped preserve the spirit of German-speaking Jewry in culture, academia, politics, and philanthropy.

== History ==
The Leo Baeck Institute New York is one of three independent research centers founded by a group of German-speaking Jewish émigrés at a conference in Jerusalem in 1955. The other Leo Baeck institutes are Leo Baeck Institute Jerusalem and Leo Baeck Institute London, and the activities of all three are coordinated by the board of directors of the Leo Baeck Institute.

Under its first executive director, Max Kreutzberger, Leo Baeck Institute New York established itself as the institute's library and archive. The library collection began with books that had been looted from Jewish libraries and collectors, and were recovered by Allied forces in World War II and restituted to Jewish libraries. Later in the 1950s, Kreutzberger and his staff began acquiring books and manuscripts from New York booksellers, and solicited donations of the personal papers and libraries of German-Jewish émigrés in New York. By 1960, when Leo Baeck Institute New York moved into a townhouse at 129 East 73rd Street on the Upper East Side in Manhattan, the collection included some 30,000 books, 250 unpublished memoirs, and extensive archives.

Significant private donations secured in the first two decades of the Leo Baeck Institute's existence included the literary estates of German philosopher Constantin Brunner, Austro-Hungarian novelist and theatre critic Fritz Mauthner, German theologian and philosopher Franz Rosenzweig, and Austrian journalist and novelist Joseph Roth.

By the 1990s, Leo Baeck Institute New York's Upper East Side townhouse could no longer efficiently or safely accommodate its collections, and LBI president Ismar Schorsch began discussions with other Jewish centers of scholarly research in New York aimed at a partnership in a shared facility. In 1993, Leo Baeck Institute, YIVO Institute for Jewish Research, Yeshiva University Museum, and the American Jewish Historical Society announced plans to jointly establish the Center for Jewish History in the former American Foundation for the Blind building on West 16th Street in Manhattan. Leo Baeck Institute New York moved its administrative offices and collections to the Center for Jewish History in 2000.

Today, Leo Baeck Institute shares library infrastructure (storage, reading room, digital and conservation labs, and information systems) as well as programming and exhibition facilities with the YIVO Institute for Jewish Research, Yeshiva University Museum, American Jewish Historical Society, and American Sephardi Federation.

=== Presence in Germany ===
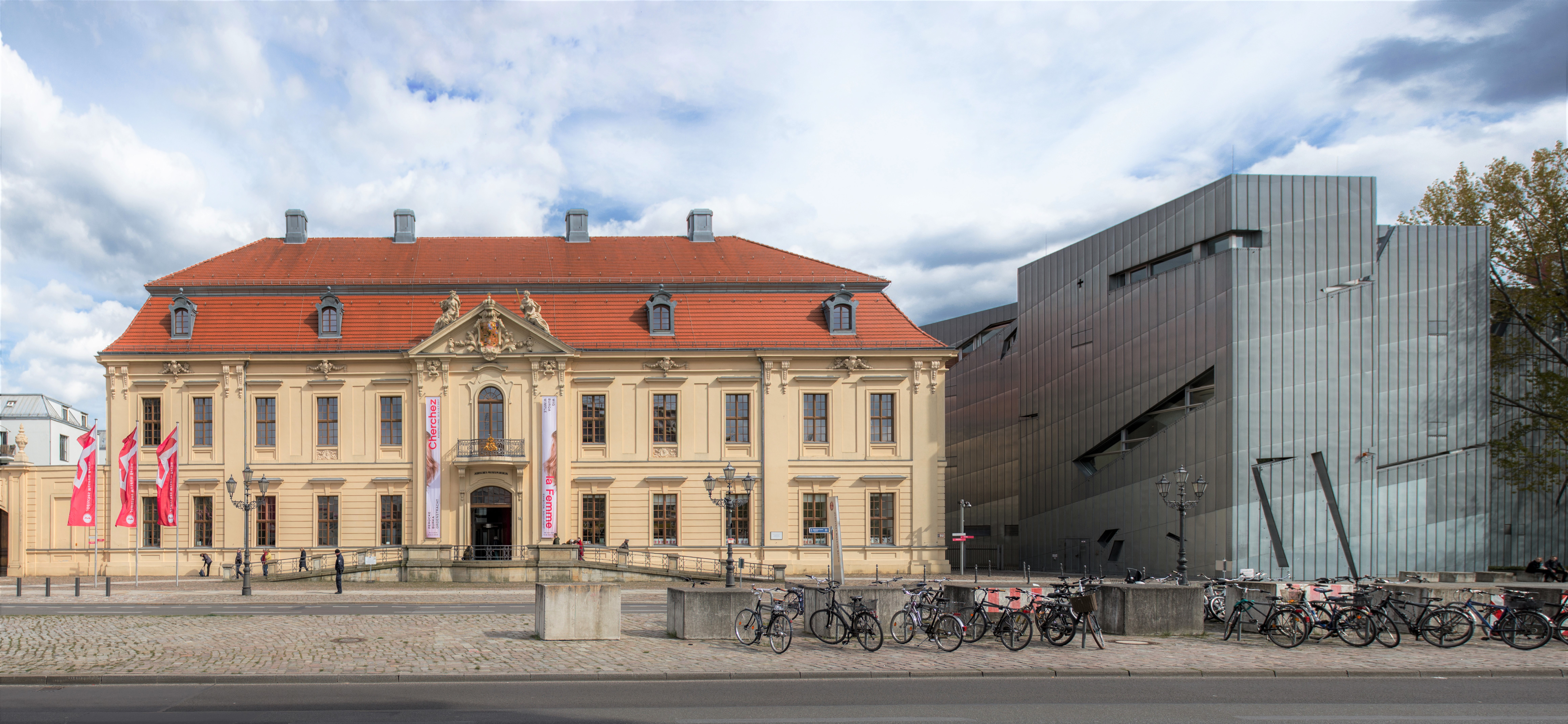
Jewish Museum Berlin

In the 1990s, Leo Baeck Institute New York deepened its ties with the Federal Republic of Germany, and received increased financial support from the West German government and private sources in Germany such as publisher Axel Springer.

Preliminary discussions about an official presence of Leo Baeck Institute New York in Germany began by the 1970s at the latest, and concrete plans for such a presence were initiated by German-born American Michael Blumenthal proposing that the Leo Baeck Institute establish a presence at the new Jewish Museum Berlin in 1998. In late 1999, the board of LBI International reached an agreement with the Jewish Museum Berlin to establish an office in the museum, and house microfilm copies of the Leo Baeck Institute archives there in order to provide easier access to the collections for researchers in Europe. In 2013, Leo Baeck Institute established an administrative office in Berlin.

== Components ==
The Leo Baeck Institute New York includes a library, an archive, an art collection, and an exhibition centre. Its offices and collections are housed in the Center for Jewish History, a centralized partnership with other Jewish organizations that share one location, with separate governing bodies and finances, but collocate resources. in New York City.

- Leo Baeck Institute's library collection: 80,000 volumes which range from collected works associated with the 16th century Reuchlin-Pfefforkorn debate over the banning of Jewish books to recent scholarship in the field of German-Jewish studies.
- Leo Baeck Institute archive: Over 4,000 linear feet of family papers, community histories, personal correspondence, genealogical materials, and business and public records of German-speaking Jews from the 18th century to the post-WWII era.
- Leo Baeck Institute art collection: 8,000 pieces of art that include works created or collected by German-speaking Jews from the 16th through the 20th centuries

== Collections ==
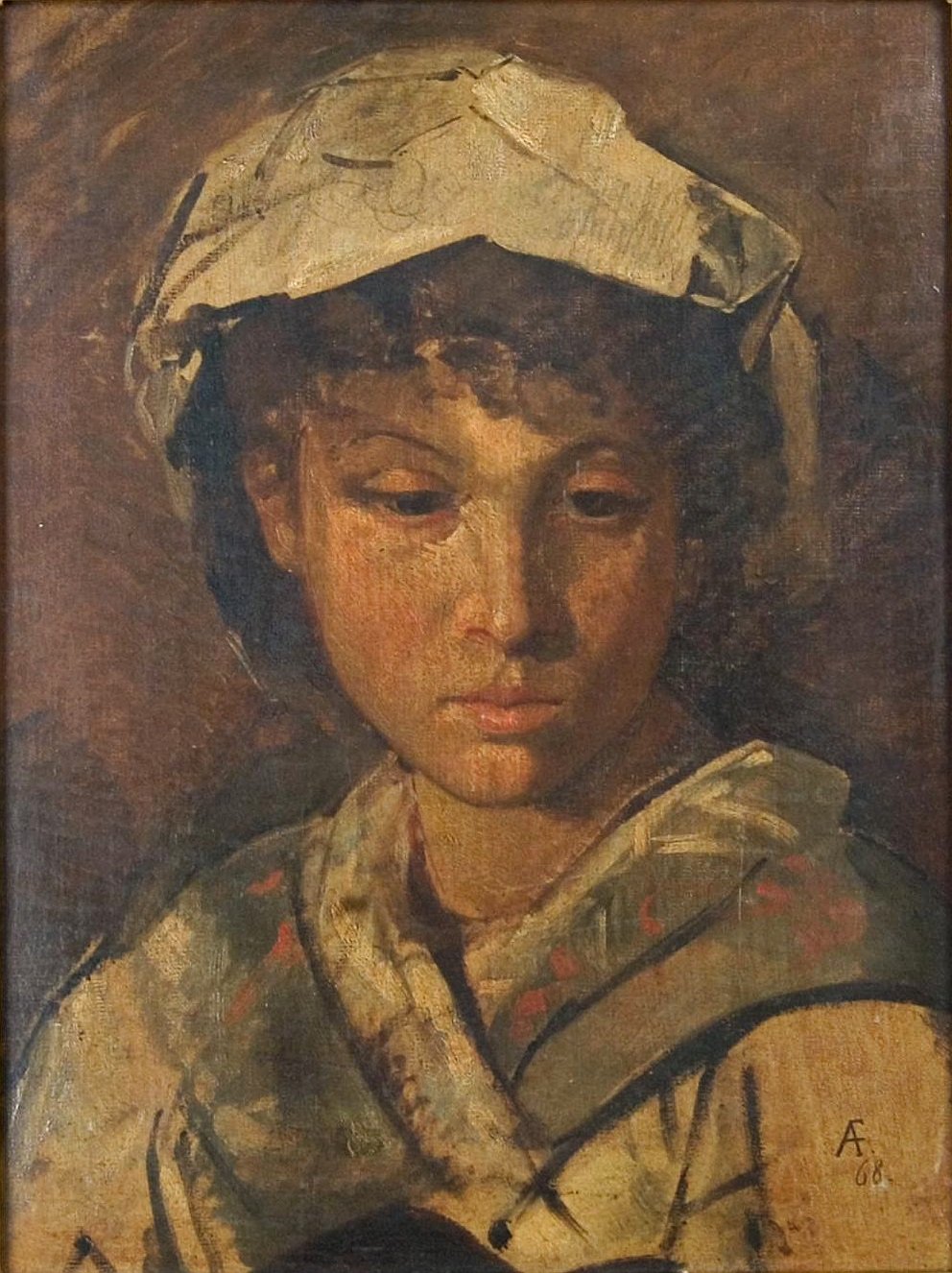
Feuerbach-mädchenkopf, 1868, oil on canvass

The bulk of Leo Baeck Institute New York's archives are the personal papers of German-speaking Jews. The library contains over 80,000 volumes.

In October 2012, Leo Baeck Institute New York announced that it had digitized nearly its entire archival holdings and a large portion of its art collections and rare books as part of the DigiBaeck project. The DigiBaeck digital collection portal includes nearly 75% of the Leo Baeck Institute's holdings, including archival materials, memoirs and manuscripts, art and objects, books and periodicals, photographs, and audio recordings.

=== Highlights ===
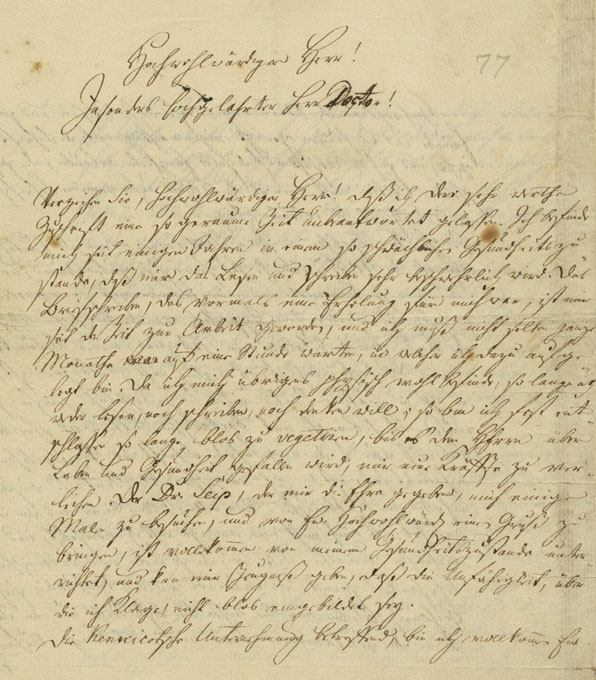
Moses Mendelssohn papers

- First editions of philosopher Moses Mendelssohn and poet and writer Heinrich Heine
- Early 16th century writings, including Martin Luther, Sir Thomas More, and Erasmus, as well as a comprehensive collection of periodicals published from the 18th to 20th centuries
- Limited editions of 20th century artists’ portfolios and several illustrated 18th-century books on Jewish customs in the rare book collection.

=== Digitization ===
- Freimann Collection: Digitation of recovered partial volumes of the Wissenschaft des Judentums (Science of Judaism) in coordination with Frankfurt University Library, funded by a joint grant from the National Endowment for the Humanities and the German Research Foundation (Deutsche Forschungsgemeinschaft – DFG)

=== Notable people featured in the archive ===
- Karl Otten, German expressionist writer and broadcaster

== Fellowships, seminars, and medals ==
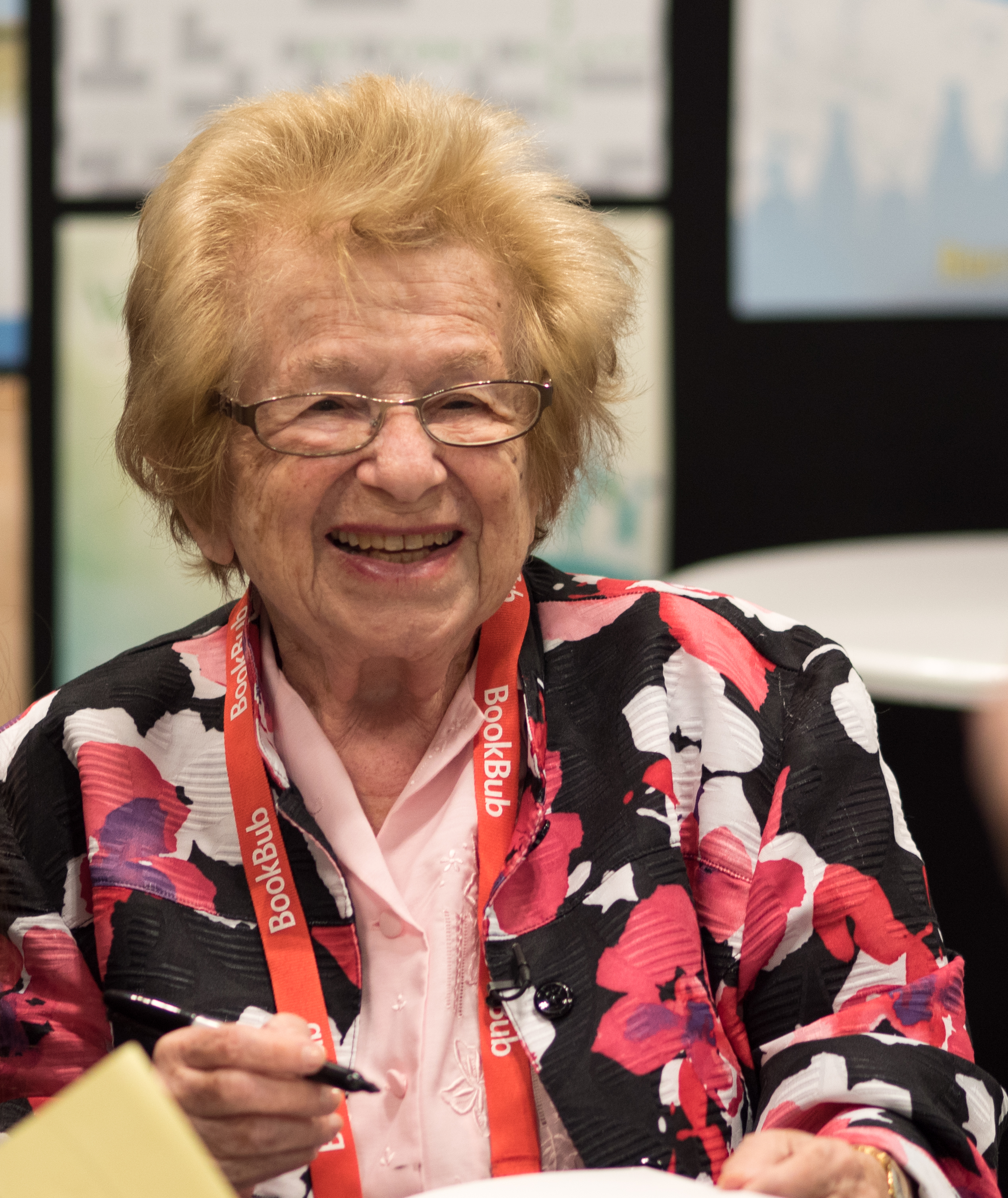
Dr. Ruth Westheimer

In addition to the archival processes of acquiring, cataloguing, and preserving, Leo Baeck Institute New York promotes study by sponsoring several fellowships for scholars working the field of German-Jewish history, holding seminars, and creating exhibits.

Leo Baeck Institute New York also annually awards the Leo Baeck Medal to individuals whose humanitarian work promotes tolerance, social justice and upon those who have helped preserve the spirit of German-speaking Jewry in culture, academia, politics, and philanthropy. It is the highest recognition the institute bestows.

Some past recipients include German Chancellor Angela Merkel, German Ambassador Wolfgang Ischinger, businessman and journalist Mathias Dopfner, economist and former president of the World Bank James D. Wolfensohn, German Minister of the Interior Otto Schily, sex therapist talk show host and Holocaust survivor Dr. Ruth Westheimer (Dr. Ruth), German President Johannes Rau, and business leader, economist, and political adviser W. Michael Blumenthal.

== Exhibitions ==
- Destination Shanghai: The Jewish Community of Shanghai, 1936-1949. May–April, 2013.
- Transcending Tradition: Jewish Mathematicians in German-Speaking Academic Culture. July 29, 2013- January 5, 2014.

== See also ==
- Leo Baeck
- Leo Baeck Medal
