= Samuel Baeck =

German rabbi (1834-1912)

Samuel Baeck, also spelled Samuel Bäck (Hebrew: שמואל בק, born Boskowitz, Moravia, April 3, 1834 – died Lissa, May 11, 1912) was a German rabbi and father of Leo Baeck.

His father, Nathan Baeck, was rabbi in Kromau, Moravia; his grandfather, Abraham, rabbi in Holitsch, Hungary. Samuel Baeck married Eva Placzek (1840–1926), the daughter of Abraham Placzek, chief rabbi of Moravia.

After being educated in the public schools of Kromau and at the Talmudic schools of Nikolsburg (Moravia) – now Mikulov – and Pressburg, Baeck studied at the University of Vienna, continuing his Talmudic studies under R. Horwitz. After receiving his diploma as rabbi from the chief rabbi Placzek of Boskovice, he was appointed rabbi in Böhmisch Leipa, and was in 1864 called as rabbi to the celebrated community of Lissa, province of Posen. He was a member of the municipal school committee and of the "Waisenrat", instructor in the Jewish religion at the gymnasium, and a delegate to the Deutsch-Israelitischen Gemeindebund. He was the first to advocate with success the introduction of the teaching of the Jewish religion in the colleges of Prussia.

== Published works ==
- Inder und Hebräer (Indians and Hebrews);
- Erzählungen und Religionssätze der Heiligen Schrift, Lissa, 1875, 2d ed. 1886;
- Systematische Religionssätze der Heiligen Schrift, ib. 1875;
- Geschichte des Judischen Volkes und Seiner Literatur vom Babylonischen Exile bis auf die Gegenwart (History and Literature of the Jewish People from the Babylonian Exile to the Present Day) ib. 1878, 2d ed., 1894;
- Die Halachistische und Responsen Literatur, die Literatur der Darshanim, Sittenlehrer, und Apologeten, in Winter and Wünsche, Jüdische Literatur, vols. ii. and iii.
