= Michael A. Meyer =

German-born American historian (born 1937)

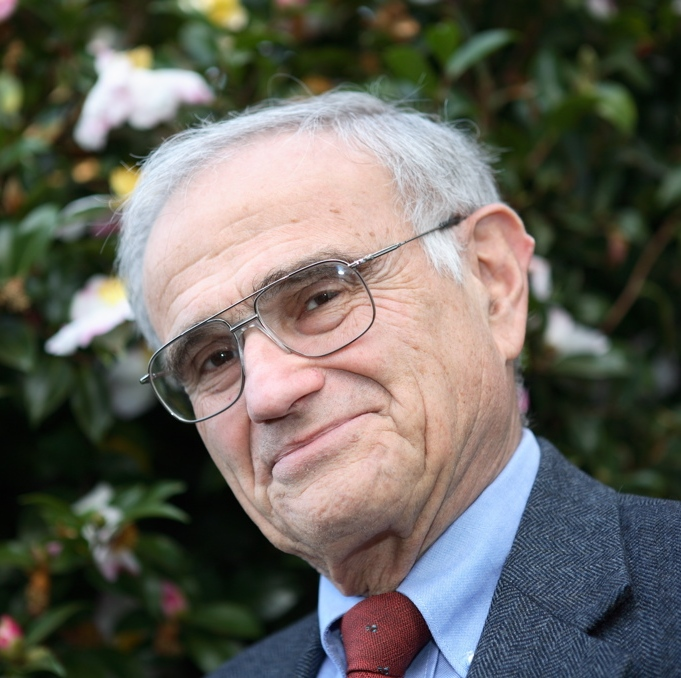
- Michael A. Meyer in 2007
- Born: 15 November 1937 (age 88); Berlin
- Awards: National Jewish Book Award

Academic background
- Education: University of California, Los Angeles; Hebrew Union College-Jewish Institute of Religion

Academic work
- Discipline: history
- Institutions: Hebrew Union College-Jewish Institute of Religion
- Main interests: modern Jewish history
- Notable works: Jewish Identity in the Modern World

Michael Albert Meyer (born 1937) is a German-born American historian of modern Jewish history. He taught for over 50 years at the Hebrew Union College-Jewish Institute of Religion in Cincinnati, Ohio. He is currently the Adolph S. Ochs Emeritus Professor of Jewish History at that institution. He was one of the founders of the Association for Jewish Studies, and served as its president from 1978 to 1980. He also served as International President of the Leo Baeck Institute from 1992 to 2013. He has published many books and articles, most notably on the history of German Jews, the origins and history of the Reform movement in Judaism, and Jewish people and faith confronting modernity. He is a three-time National Jewish Book Award winner.

== Life and education ==
Meyer was born in Berlin and lived with his family there until their escape from Nazi Germany in the summer of 1941.

In Germany, his father was an attorney, who subsequently had his law license revoked by the Nazis and spent time in forced labor before managing to take his family to the United States via Spain.

Meyer grew up in Los Angeles, California, graduated with highest honors from UCLA and received his PhD in Jewish history from the Hebrew Union College (HUC). Upon graduation, in 1964, the then-President of HUC, Nelson Glueck, recruited Meyer to join the faculty. Meyer taught there for his entire career, starting in Los Angeles, before moving to the Cincinnati campus in 1967. He has also taught repeatedly over the years at HUC's campus in Jerusalem.

Meyer has also been affiliated with the Hebrew University Institute for Advanced Studies, the University of Pennsylvania, the Be'er Sheva University (now the Ben Gurion University of the Negev), Antioch College and the University of Haifa.

Meyer's son is United States government official Jonathan Meyer, 6th General Counsel of the United States Department of Homeland Security.

== Scholarship ==
Michael A. Meyer is a leading historian of modern Jewish history, particularly noted for his work on German Jewry, the development of Reform Judaism, and the historiography of modern Judaism. His scholarship is widely regarded as foundational for the study of Jewish religious and intellectual transformation from the Enlightenment through the twentieth century.

After completing his doctoral dissertation, Meyer published it under the title The Origins of the Modern Jew: Jewish Identity and European Culture in Germany, 1749–1824 (1967). The book, which examined the emergence of modern Jewish identity within the context of German intellectual and cultural life, won the National Jewish Book Award for Jewish Thought in 1968 and has remained continuously in print for decades. Meyer’s subsequent monograph Response to Modernity: A History of the Reform Movement in Judaism (1988) is widely considered the standard historical account of Reform Judaism, tracing its ideological, liturgical, and institutional development from nineteenth-century Germany to the modern period. Other notable books include Jewish Identity in the Modern World (1990), which won the National Jewish Book Award for Jewish Thought in 1989, and the essay collection Judaism Within Modernity: Essays on Jewish History and Religion (2001).

Beyond his monographic work, Meyer has made major contributions to the historiography of Judaism itself. A substantial portion of his scholarship addresses the intellectual legacy of Wissenschaft des Judentums and the methodological tensions between historical scholarship, religious commitment, and modern Jewish identity. His essays on Jewish historiography have been influential in framing debates about continuity, rupture, and self-understanding in modern Jewish historical writing.

Meyer has also played a central role as an editor and scholarly mediator within modern Jewish studies. He served as general editor of the multi-volume history of German Jewry published in parallel editions as Deutsch-Jüdische Geschichte in der Neuzeit (Munich: C. H. Beck), German-Jewish History in Modern Times (New York: Columbia University Press), and German-Jewish History in Modern Times (Jerusalem: Shazar; Hebrew). The German edition comprised four volumes—Tradition und Aufklärung, 1600–1780; Emanzipation und Akkulturation, 1780–1871; Umstrittene Integration, 1871–1918; and Aufbruch und Zerstörung, 1918–1945. The English edition appeared in four corresponding volumes—Tradition and Enlightenment, 1600–1780; Emancipation and Acculturation, 1780–1871; Integration in Dispute, 1871–1918; and Renewal and Destruction, 1918–1945. The Hebrew edition was likewise issued in four volumes—Masoret ve-Haskalah, 1600–1780; Emantsipatsyah ve-Akulturatsyah, 1780–1871; Hitmashkhekhut Shenuyah, 1871–1918; and Hitḥadshut ve-Hurban, 1918–1945. Published between 1996 and 2005, the series constitutes a comprehensive collaborative synthesis of the social, cultural, religious, and political history of German Jewry from the early modern period through the Holocaust and has become a standard reference work in the field.

In addition to this project, Meyer edited or co-edited major collective volumes such as Ideas of Jewish History (1974), Joachim Prinz, Rebellious Rabbi: An Autobiography—The German and Early American Years (2007), The Reform Judaism Reader: North American Documents (2000), and Frontiers of Jewish Scholarship: Expanding Origins, Transcending Borders (2022), underscoring his role in shaping the direction of Jewish historical scholarship across linguistic, national, and generational boundaries. His scholarly activity further includes translations of key works by Martin Buber and Gershom Scholem, through which he helped make German-Jewish intellectual traditions accessible to an English-speaking readership.

A prolific author, Meyer has published hundreds of scholarly articles, encyclopedia entries, reviews, and essays in multiple languages over the course of his career, which are all available at his Academia page.

== Selected awards and honors ==
- National Jewish Book Award in the Jewish Thought category - 1968 (The Origins of the Modern Jew: Jewish Identity and European Culture in Germany, 1749-1824)
- National Jewish Book Award in Jewish History – 1989 (Response to Modernity: A History of the Reform Movement in Judaism)
- National Foundation for Jewish Culture's Scholarship Award in Historical Studies – 1996
- National Jewish Book Award in Jewish History – 1997 (German-Jewish history in modern times, volume 2 : Emancipation and acculturation, 1780–1871)
- Honorary Doctor of Hebrew Letters degree from the Jewish Theological Seminary of America – 2001
- Moses Mendelssohn Award of the Leo Baeck Institute – 2015

In 2008, Meyer was honored with a Festschrift edited by Lauren B. Strauss and Michael Brenner, entitled Mediating Modernity: Challenges and Trends in the Jewish Encounter with the Modern World: Essays in Honor of Michael A. Meyer (2008). The volume brings together contributions by scholars from Europe, Israel, and North America and addresses themes central to Meyer’s scholarly work, including German-Jewish history, Reform Judaism, Jewish historiography, and the religious and intellectual challenges of modernity. The essays collectively situate Meyer’s scholarship within broader debates in modern Jewish studies and reflect his influence across multiple subfields and academic generations.

== Selected publications ==
Selected articles (and for full listing, see his Academia page)

- “The Great Debate on Antisemitism: Jewish Reaction to New Hostility in Germany, 1879–1881.” Leo Baeck Institute Year Book 11 (1966): 137–170.
- “Jewish Religious Reform and Wissenschaft des Judentums: The Positions of Zunz, Geiger, and Frankel.” Leo Baeck Institute Year Book 16 (1971): 19–41.
- “Where Does the Modern Period of Jewish History Begin?” Judaism 24, no. 3 (Summer 1975): 329–338.
- “Alienated Intellectuals in the Camp of Religious Reform: The Frankfurt Reformfreunde, 1842–1845.” AJS Review 6 (1981): 61–86.
- “Methodological Prolegomena to a History of the Reform Movement in Modern Jewry.” Hebrew Union College Annual 53 (1982): 309–316.
- “Heinrich Graetz and Heinrich von Treitschke: A Comparison of Their Historical Images of the Modern Jew.” Modern Judaism 6, no. 1 (1986): 1–11.
- “The Emergence of Modern Jewish Historiography: Motives and Motifs.” History and Theory 27, no. 4 (1988): 160–175.
- “Modernity as a Crisis for the Jews.” Modern Judaism 9, no. 2 (1989): 151–164.
- “Recent Historiography on the Jewish Religion.” Leo Baeck Institute Year Book 35 (1990): 3–16.
- “‘How Awesome Is This Place!’ The Reconceptualization of the Synagogue in Nineteenth-Century Germany.” Leo Baeck Institute Year Book 41 (1996): 51–63.
- “Gemeinschaft within Gemeinde: Religious Ferment in Weimar Liberal Judaism.” In In Search of Jewish Community, edited by Michael Brenner and Derek J. Penslar, 15–35. Bloomington: Indiana University Press, 1998.
- “The Thought of Leo Baeck: A Religious Philosophy for a Time of Adversity.” Modern Judaism 19, no. 2 (1999): 107–117.
- “Two Persistent Tensions within Wissenschaft des Judentums.” Modern Judaism 24, no. 2 (2004): 105–119.
- “German-Jewish Thinkers Reflect on the Future of the Jewish Religion.” Leo Baeck Institute Year Book 51 (2006): 3–10.
- “New Reflections on Jewish Historiography.” Jewish Quarterly Review 97, no. 4 (2007): 660–672.
- “Women in the Thought and Practice of the European Jewish Reform Movement.” In Gender and Jewish History, edited by Marion A. Kaplan and Deborah Dash Moore, 139–157. Bloomington: Indiana University Press, 2011.
- “The Refugee Rabbis: Trials and Transmissions.” Leo Baeck Institute Year Book 57 (2012): 87–103.

=== Books ===
The Origins of the Modern Jew: Jewish Identity and European Culture in Germany, 1749–1824. Detroit: Wayne State University Press, 1967.

— Hebrew edition: Jerusalem: Carmel, 1990.

— German edition: Die Anfänge des modernen Judentums: Jüdische Identität in Deutschland 1749–1824. Munich: C. H. Beck, 2011.

Ideas of Jewish History. New York: Behrman House, 1974.

Abraham Geiger, Selected Writings on Religious Reform, ed. Michael A. Meyer. Jerusalem: Shazar, 1979 (Hebrew).

German Political Pressure and Jewish Religious Response in the Nineteenth Century. New York: Leo Baeck Institute, 1981. (Leo Baeck Memorial Lecture, no. 25)

Response to Modernity: A History of the Reform Movement in Judaism. Oxford: Oxford University Press, 1988.

— Hebrew edition: Jerusalem: Shazar, 1989.

— German edition: Antwort auf die Moderne: Geschichte der Reformbewegung im Judentum. Vienna: Böhlau, 2000.

Jewish Identity in the Modern World. Seattle and London: University of Washington Press, 1990.

— German edition: Jüdische Identität in der Moderne. Frankfurt am Main: Jüdischer Verlag, 1992.

The German Jews: Some Perspectives on Their History. Syracuse: Syracuse University Press, 1990.

(B. G. Rudolph Lecture)

Hebrew Union College–Jewish Institute of Religion: A Centennial History, 1875–1975. Cincinnati: Hebrew Union College Press, 1992.

Von Moses Mendelssohn zu Leopold Zunz: Jüdische Identität in Deutschland 1749–1824. Munich: C. H. Beck, 1994.

Deutsch-Jüdische Geschichte in der Neuzeit, ed. Michael A. Meyer on behalf of the Leo Baeck Institute, with the collaboration of Michael Brenner. Munich: C. H. Beck, 1996–1997.

— Vol. I: Tradition und Aufklärung, 1600–1780 (1996)

— Vol. II: Emanzipation und Akkulturation, 1780–1871 (1996)

— Vol. III: Umstrittene Integration, 1871–1918 (1997)

— Vol. IV: Aufbruch und Zerstörung, 1918–1945 (1997)

German-Jewish History in Modern Times, ed. Michael A. Meyer; Michael Brenner, assistant editor. New York: Columbia University Press, 1996–1998.

— Vol. 1: Tradition and Enlightenment, 1600–1780 (1996)

— Vol. 2: Emancipation and Acculturation, 1780–1871 (1997)

— Vol. 3: Integration in Dispute, 1871–1918 (1998)

— Vol. 4: Renewal and Destruction, 1918–1945 (1998)

German-Jewish History in Modern Times, ed. Michael A. Meyer. Jerusalem: Shazar, 2000–2005 (Hebrew).

— Vols. 1, 2, 3, 4

The Reform Judaism Reader: North American Documents, ed. Michael A. Meyer and W. Gunther Plaut. New York: UAHC Press, 2000.

Judaism Within Modernity: Essays on Jewish History and Religion. Detroit: Wayne State University Press, 2001.

— Hebrew edition: Tel Aviv: Am Oved, 2006.

Die religiösen Strömungen im modernen Judentum. Munich: Lehrstuhl für Jüdische Geschichte und Literatur, 2003.

Leo Baeck Werke, vol. 6: Briefe, Reden, Aufsätze, ed. Michael A. Meyer in collaboration with Bärbel Such. Gütersloh: Gütersloher Verlagshaus, 2003.

The Moral Legacy of Leo Baeck. New York: Association for Progressive Judaism, 2007.

Joachim Prinz, Rebellious Rabbi: An Autobiography—The German and Early American Years, ed. Michael A. Meyer. Bloomington: Indiana University Press, 2007.

Rabbi Leo Baeck: Living a Religious Imperative in Troubled Times. Philadelphia: University of Pennsylvania Press, 2021.

— Hebrew edition: Jerusalem: Carmel, 2023.

Frontiers of Jewish Scholarship: Expanding Origins, Transcending Borders, ed. Anne O. Albert, Noah S. Gerber, and Michael A. Meyer. Philadelphia: University of Pennsylvania Press, 2022.

Above All, We Are Jews: A Biography of Rabbi Alexander Schindler. New York: CCAR Press, 2025.
