= Center for Jewish History =

Nonprofit organization in New York City

The Center for Jewish History
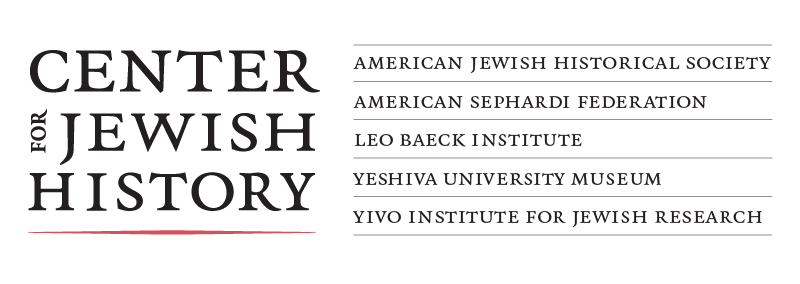
- Center for Jewish History logo

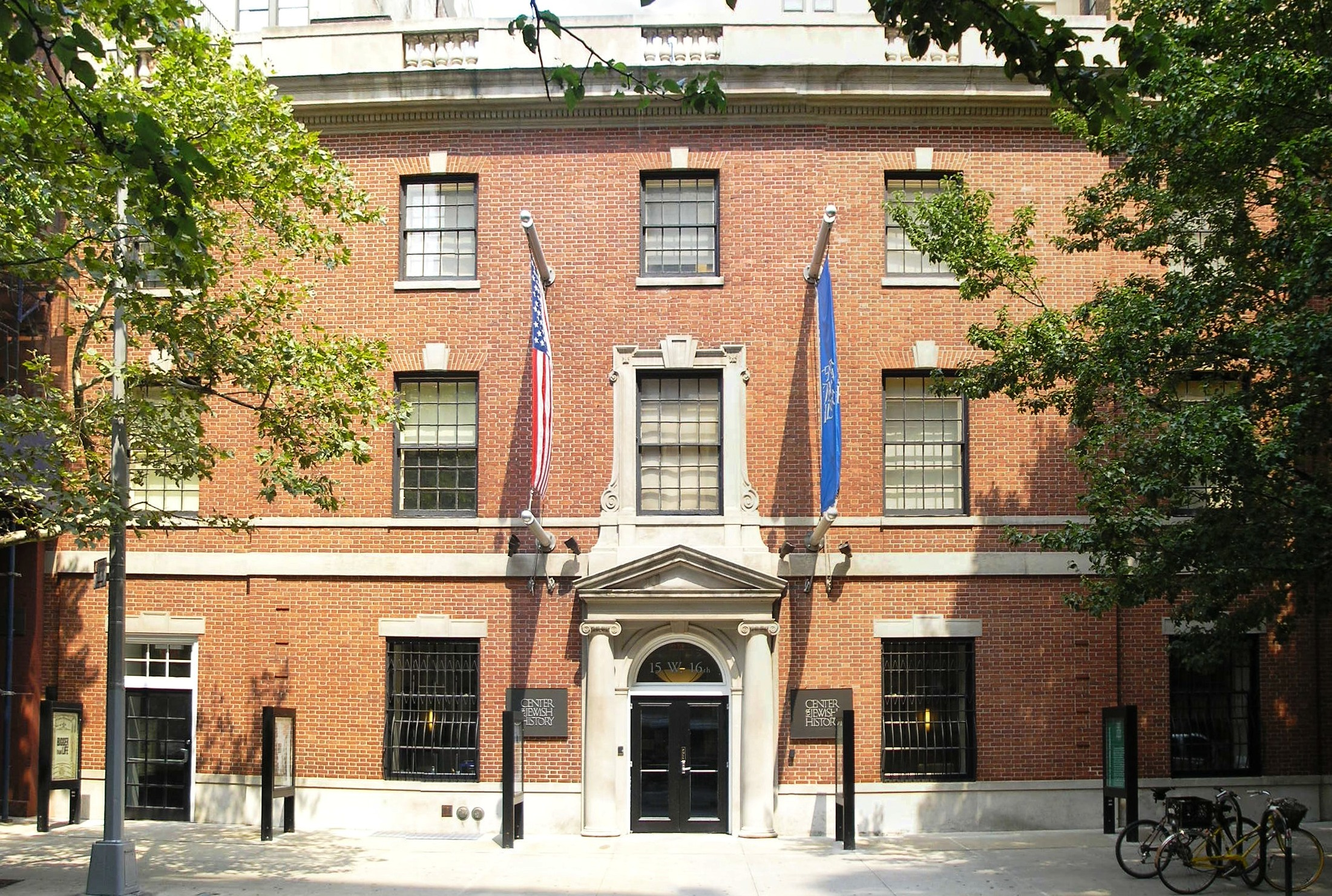
- The Center for Jewish History on 16th Street
- Established: 2000
- Location: 15 West 16th Street; Manhattan, New York 10011; United States
- Coordinates: 40.738047°N 73.993821°W
- Public transit access: New York City Subway: at 14th Street–Union Square; New York City Bus: M1, M2, M3, M55, M14A, M14D
- Website: cjh.org

The Center for Jewish History is a partnership of five Jewish history, scholarship, and art organizations in New York City, namely the American Jewish Historical Society, American Sephardi Federation, Leo Baeck Institute New York, Yeshiva University Museum, and YIVO Institute for Jewish Research. Together, housed in one location, the partners have separate governing bodies and finances, but collocate resources. The partners' collections make up the biggest repository of Jewish history in the United States. The Center for Jewish History also serves as a centralized place of scholarly research, events, exhibitions, and performances. Located within the center are the Lillian Goldman Reading Room, Ackman & Ziff Family Genealogy Institute and a Collection Management & Conservation Wing. The Center for Jewish History is also an affiliate of the Smithsonian Institution.

== History ==
In 2000, the Center for Jewish History was opened after a six year construction and planning phase. The center was created with the goal of creating synergies among the five member organizations, each offering a different approach to Jewish history, scholarship and art. This ambitious approach to building an archive dedicated to uniting different views of Jewish culture has formed the largest repository documenting the Jewish experience outside of Israel. The center's approach and large collection have led some to refer to it as the Jewish Library of Congress.

In the late 1980s, Bruce Slovin, then chairman of YIVO, originated the concept of a unified center where academic-focussed partner institutions could share resources. The idea was triggered when he realized that the then home of YIVO, a mansion located at 86th and Fifth Avenue, was not able to meet the needs of its visitors or the proper storage of archival materials. The YIVO facilities at the time were not temperature controlled and resulted in an environment that was hazardous to the collection, and ultimately made archival study difficult.

The Leo Baeck Institute was previously located at 129 East 73rd Street, and the American Jewish Historical Society, which had previously been a New York City-based institution prior to the early 1960s, was then located near Brandeis University in Waltham, Massachusetts. The Yeshiva University Museum was located in the Washington Heights neighborhood uptown.

When it opened its doors to the public in October 2000, the center struggled with financial problems. In 2007, there were preliminary talks about a partnership with NYU's Skirball Department for Hebrew and Judaic Studies to the benefit of both organizations. In the end, the center and Skirball decided not to move forward. In 2010, the Center for Jewish History was able to raise $30 million to retire its construction debt. The amount was raised and donated by the chairman and founder of the center, Bruce Slovin; co-chairmen William Ackman and Joseph Steinberg; the Fairholme Foundation; and 19 other donors. The fundraising efforts allowed the center to pay off its accrued debts.

In 2012, the center received a top rating of four stars from the Charity Navigator non-profit evaluation service.

In 2013, the Lillian Goldman Charitable Trust awarded the center a $1.5 million grant to establish a reference services division.

At its 25th-anniversary gala in December 2025, the Center for Jewish History announced a $25 million matching grant from Bill Ackman and Neri Oxman. The donors immediately pledged $16 million in response. Throughout the year, the center had welcomed almost 300,000 visitors.

=== Facilities ===
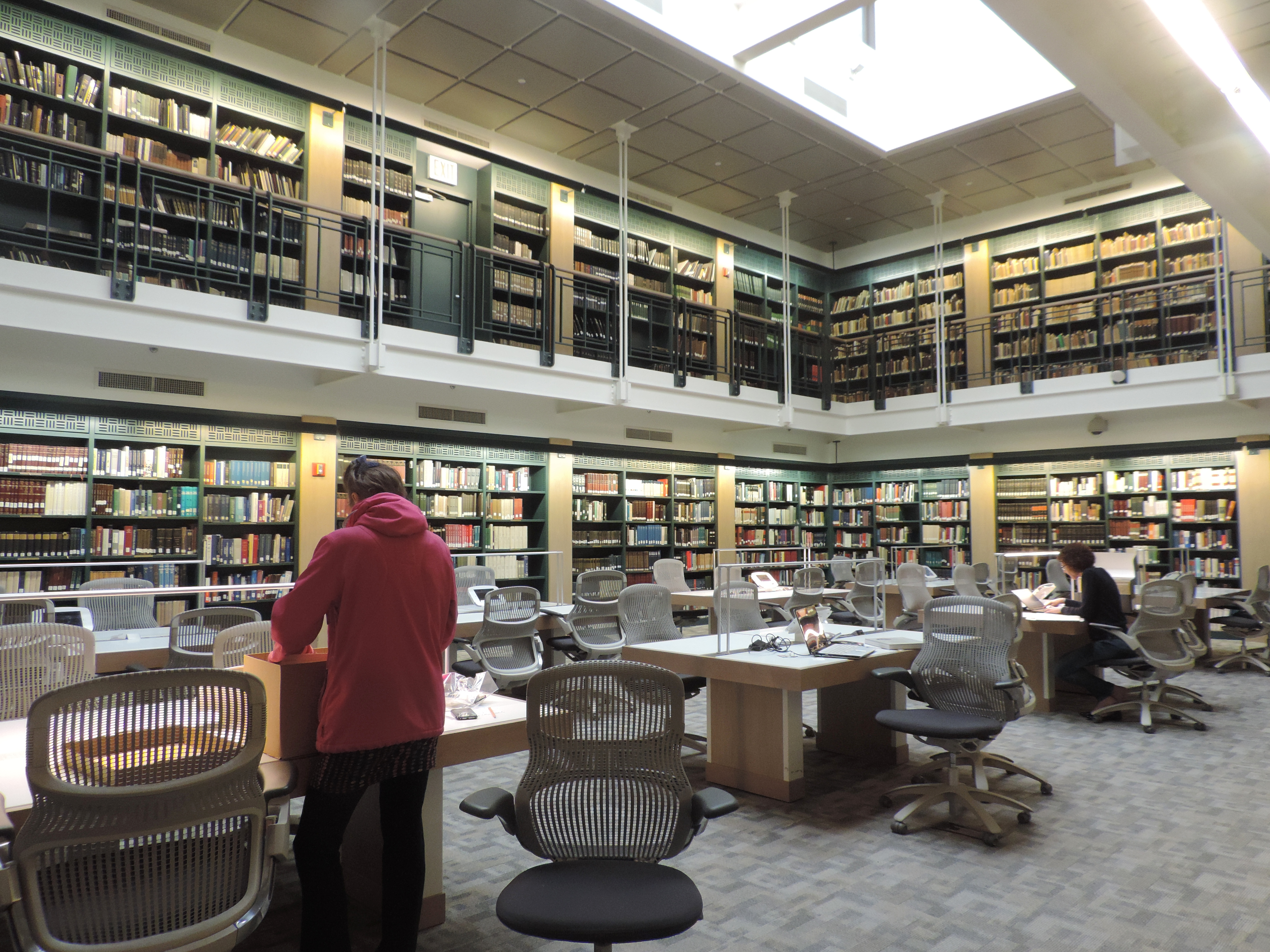
Reading room

The center is located in Manhattan's Chelsea neighborhood, and is a four-building 125,000 square feet (11,600 m^{2}) campus built around a courtyard that has a central entrance on 16th Street. The center is made up of four buildings from when the location served as the campus of the American Foundation for the Blind and two new buildings constructed by the center in 2000.

== Collections ==
The partners' collections include more than 100 million documents, 500,000 books, thousands of art objects, textiles, ritual objects, music, films, and photographs. Most of the materials held at the Center had previously been housed in the member institutions and were at risk of damage or destruction. The center is heavily involved with the preservation of records that define moments in Jewish immigration to New York City. A $670,000 grant awarded in 2007 helped to improve and crate a centralized catalog the all partner institutions' holdings.

The collections range from the early modern era in Europe and pre-colonial times in the Americas to present-day materials from across the globe. The center provides access to a comprehensive collection of historic archival materials, including those of: Franz Kafka, Theodor Herzl, Moses Mendelssohn, Sigmund Freud and Albert Einstein.

In addition to historical documents like the 1478 record of the trial of Simon of Trent, the center also includes holdings of artwork by Max Lieberman as well as Jewish ephemera like philosopher Moses Mendelssohn's eyeglasses.

=== Partner collection highlights ===
- Original handwritten copy of Emma Lazarus' 1883 poem, "The New Colossus" that was later inscribed on the base of the Statue of Liberty
- Sandy Koufax's Brooklyn Dodgers jersey
- Letter from Thomas Jefferson to New York's oldest Jewish congregation
- First Hebrew prayer books printed in America

=== Digital initiatives ===
- In 2011, the Center for Jewish History began a 2-year project called, "Illuminating Hidden Collections at the Center for Jewish History," with a $229,600 grant from the Council on Library and Information Resources
- In 2013, the Center for Jewish History donated 600 images to the Google Art Project, which is part of the Google Cultural Institute, an initiative that puts cultural material online. The center was one of four New York City-based institutions to donate at that time, joining eight others. The images are very high resolution and include rich metadata.
