= Leo Baeck =

German Jewish rabbi and theologian (1873–1956)

Rabbi Leo Baeck
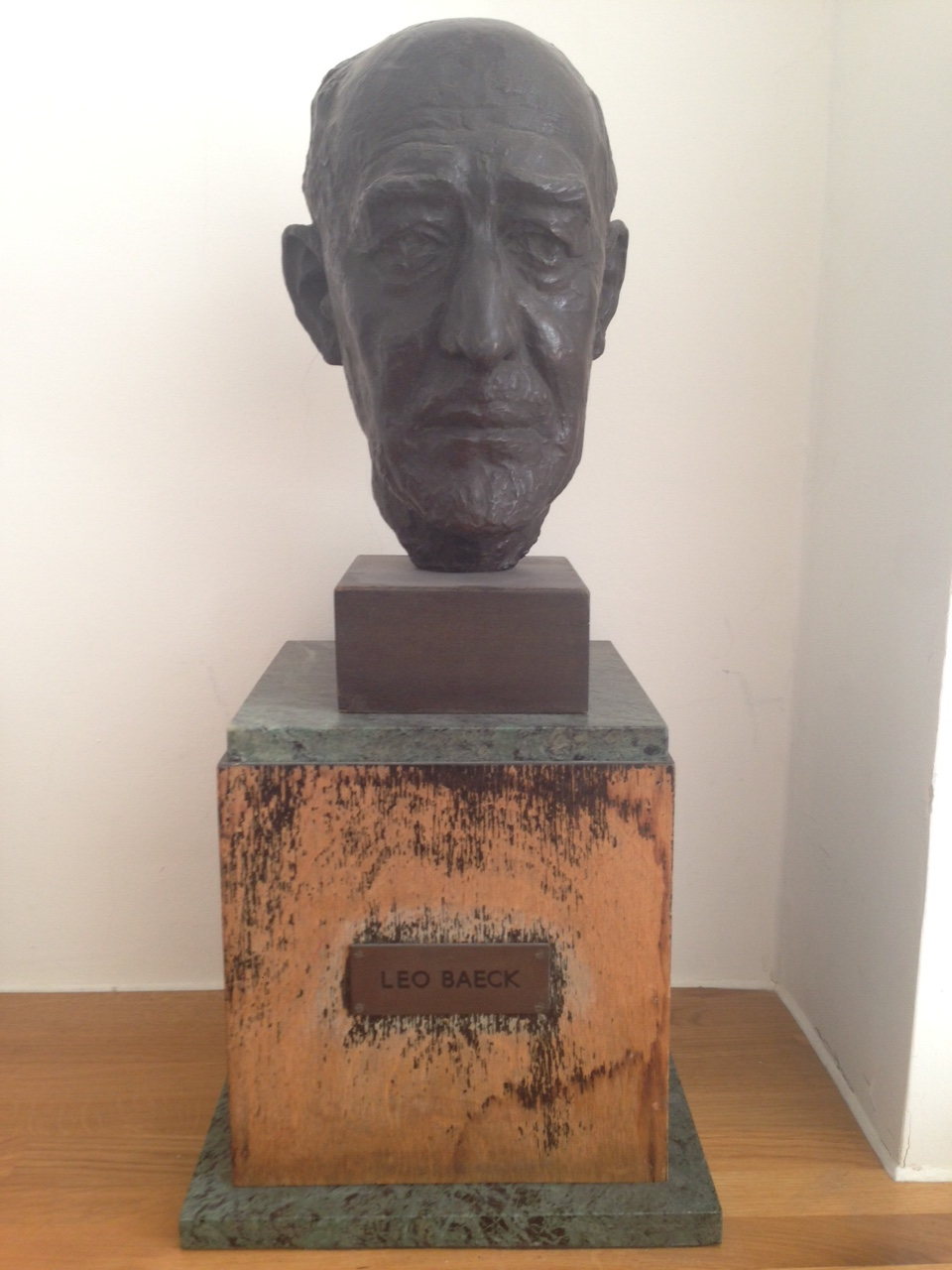
- Bust of Leo Baeck at the Wiener Holocaust Library

Personal life
- Born: 23 May 1873 Lissa, Province of Posen, German Empire
- Died: 2 November 1956 (aged 83) London, England
- Spouse: Natalie Hamburger

Religious life
- Religion: Judaism
- Denomination: Reform Judaism

Jewish leader
- Synagogue: Fasanenstrasse Synagogue
- Semikhah: Hochschule für die Wissenschaft des Judentums

Leo Baeck (German: [ˈleːo ˈbɛk]; 23 May 1873 – 2 November 1956) was a 20th-century German rabbi, scholar, and theologian. He served as leader of Reform Judaism in his native country and internationally, and later represented all German Jews during the Nazi era. After the Second World War, he settled in London, in the United Kingdom, where he served as the chairman of the World Union for Progressive Judaism. In 1955, the Leo Baeck Institute for the study of the history and culture of German-speaking Jewry was established, and Baeck was its first international president. The Leo Baeck Medal has been awarded since 1978 to those who have helped preserve the spirit of German-speaking Jewry in culture, academia, politics, and philanthropy.

== Early years ==
Baeck was born in Lissa (Leszno) (then in the German Province of Posen, now in Poland), the son of Rabbi Samuel Baeck and his wife Eva (née Placzek). He began his education at the Jewish Theological Seminary of Breslau in 1894. He also studied philosophy in Berlin with Wilhelm Dilthey. He served as a rabbi in Oppeln (now Opole), Düsseldorf, and Berlin. He also taught at the Hochschule für die Wissenschaft des Judentums (Higher Institute for Jewish Studies).

In 1905 Baeck published The Essence of Judaism, in response to Adolf von Harnack's What is Christianity?. This book, which interpreted and valorized Judaism through a prism of neo-Kantianism tempered with religious existentialism, made him a famous proponent for the Jewish people and their faith. During World War I, Baeck served as a chaplain in the German Imperial Army. Initially non-Zionist, he came to support Aliyah amid the rise in antisemitism in his home country, heading the German Keren Hayesod.

== Nazi persecution and deportation ==
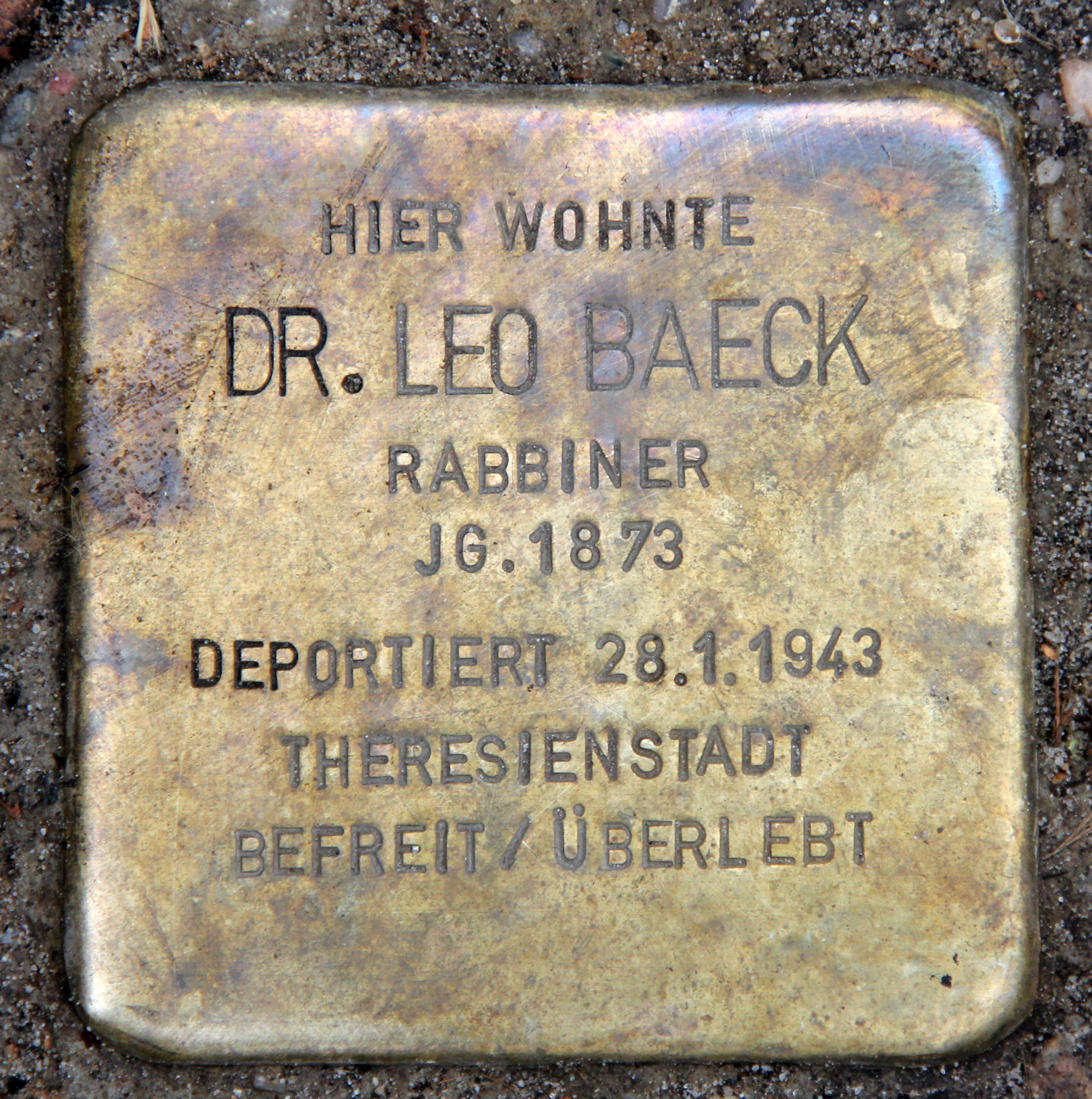
Stolperstein (stumbling block), Leo Baeck, Fritz-Elsas-Straße 15, Berlin-Schöneberg, Germany

In 1933, after the Nazis took power, Baeck worked to defend the Jewish community as president of the Reichsvertretung der Deutschen Juden, an umbrella organization that united German Jewry from 1933 to 1938. After the Reichsvertretung was disbanded during Kristallnacht in 1938, the Nazis reassembled the council's members under the government controlled Reichsvereinigung. Baeck headed this organization as its president until his deportation. On 27 January 1943, he was deported to the Theresienstadt concentration camp.

Baeck became the "honorary head" of the Council of Elders (Judenrat) in Theresienstadt. As such, he was protected from transports and with his protection list, could also save his relatives from transports, among others his grand-niece Ruth (b. 1925). Moreover, Baeck became "prominent", which meant that he had better accommodation, better food and could receive mail more often.

Hannah Arendt in her 1963 book Eichmann in Jerusalem examined Jewish cooperation with the Nazi authorities during the Holocaust, and names Baeck as one of those functionaries who withheld the truth from their communities of the end awaiting them, believing it more "humane" to bear the secret since "living in the expectation of death by gassing would only be the harder". Baeck, according to Arendt, also thought the existence of a Jewish police force within the camps would render the "ordeal easier" whereas in her view they turned out to be more brutal. Auschwitz escapee Siegfried Lederer testified to Baeck about the death camp, but Baeck believed that revealing the truth to the Theresienstadt prisoners could cause "catastrophe".

He gave lectures, was active in the interfaith dialogue between traditional Jews and Christians of Jewish origin, worked in the youth care sector, which he directed from November 1944 on, and was friendly with many of the functionaries. After liberation, he headed the Council of Elders; the last Elder of the Jews was the Czech communist Jiří Vogel. Baeck's lectures were credited with helping prisoners survive their confinement. Heinrich F. Liebrecht said Baeck's lectures helped him to discover wellsprings of strength and the conviction that his life had a purpose. "From here came the impulse to really endure, and the belief that we were able to do so."

Up until his deportation, numerous American institutions offered to help him escape the war and immigrate to the United States. Baeck refused to abandon his community and declined the offers. Nevertheless, he managed to survive the Holocaust, though three of his sisters perished in the ghetto.

== Post-war life and work ==
After the war, Baeck relocated to London, where he accepted the Presidency of the North Western Reform Synagogue in Temple Fortune. He taught at Hebrew Union College in the United States, and eventually became Chairman of the World Union for Progressive Judaism. It was during this time he published his second major work, This People Israel, which he partially penned during his imprisonment by the Nazis. His increased interfaith work also meant that he revised and, to an extent, reclaimed for Judaism, the founding figures of Christianity, Jesus and Paul.

He died on 2 November 1956, in London, England.

== The International Leo Baeck Institute ==
In 1955, the Leo Baeck Institute for the study of the history and culture of German-speaking Jewry was established, and Baeck was the first international president of this institute. The Institute now includes branches around the world including the Leo Baeck Institute New York, and the Leo Baeck Institute London.

There are institutions named after Leo Baeck, on every inhabited continent, including the Leo Baeck Centre for Progressive Judaism in Melbourne, Australia.

The asteroid 100047 Leobaeck is named in his honour, as is Leo Baeck College, the Reform/Progressive rabbinical college in London.
