= Robert Weltsch =

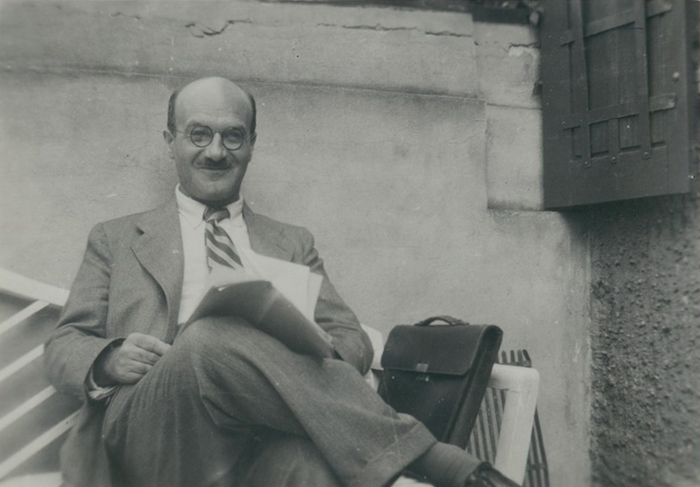
- Robert Weltsch
- Born: 20 June 1891; Prague, Austria-Hungary
- Died: 22 December 1982 (aged 91); Jerusalem, Israel
- Occupation: Journalist
- Relatives: Felix Weltsch (cousin)

Robert Weltsch (20 June 1891, in Prague – 22 December 1982, in Jerusalem) was a journalist, editor and prominent Zionist.

== Early life ==
Robert Weltsch was born on 20 June 1891 in Prague when it was part of Austria-Hungary. The city had a strong Jewish community which was culturally German. Weltsch fought in World War I on the German side. His cousin, Felix Weltsch, was a friend of Franz Kafka and Max Brod, and Robert was also lifelong friends with the latter; they shared a strong interest in idealistic Zionism.

From 1925 to 1933, Robert Weltsch was active in the Zionist organization Brit Shalom which advocated a binational solution in Palestine, with Jews and Arabs living together. In this cause, he was befriended by Martin Buber and Albert Einstein, among others.

After fleeing to Palestine in 1938, he continued asking for accommodation with the Arab population of Mandate Palestine. He was friendly with Chaim Weizmann, later the first president of Israel.

== Career ==
Weltsch was editor of the Jüdische Rundschau (Jewish Review), a newspaper published twice a week in Berlin, Germany during the years the Nazis were gaining support. The newspaper had a peak readership of 37,000. He edited and wrote for the Rundschau from 1919 through its demise under the Nazis in 1938. His best-known contribution was a reaction to the April 1, 1933 Nazi-led boycott of Jewish shops when in his editorial Weltsch used the phrase, "Wear it with pride, the yellow badge." This was a call for strength and solidarity, and a lone voice in reaction to the Nazi boycott. It was not a reference to the forced-wearing of yellow armbands, which the Nazis didn't force on Jews until 1941, but rather a call for unity to a German-Jewish community that had until then thought of itself as comfortably assimilated into German life.

Weltsch worked for many years as a correspondent for Haaretz, a major Israeli newspaper. In 1945 he moved to London, becoming Haaretz's London correspondent. In this capacity he covered the Nuremberg Trials. He was a major force in establishing the Leo Baeck Institute, named for a rabbi and leader of the German-Jewish community during the Nazi years. The Institute is a group dedicated to preserving German-Jewish history and culture and is still active. Weltsch edited the Institute's Yearbook from 1956 to 1978.

== Death ==
Weltsch died on 22 December 1982 in Jerusalem, Israel.
