= Leo Baeck Institute =

International Jewish research institute

The Leo Baeck Institute
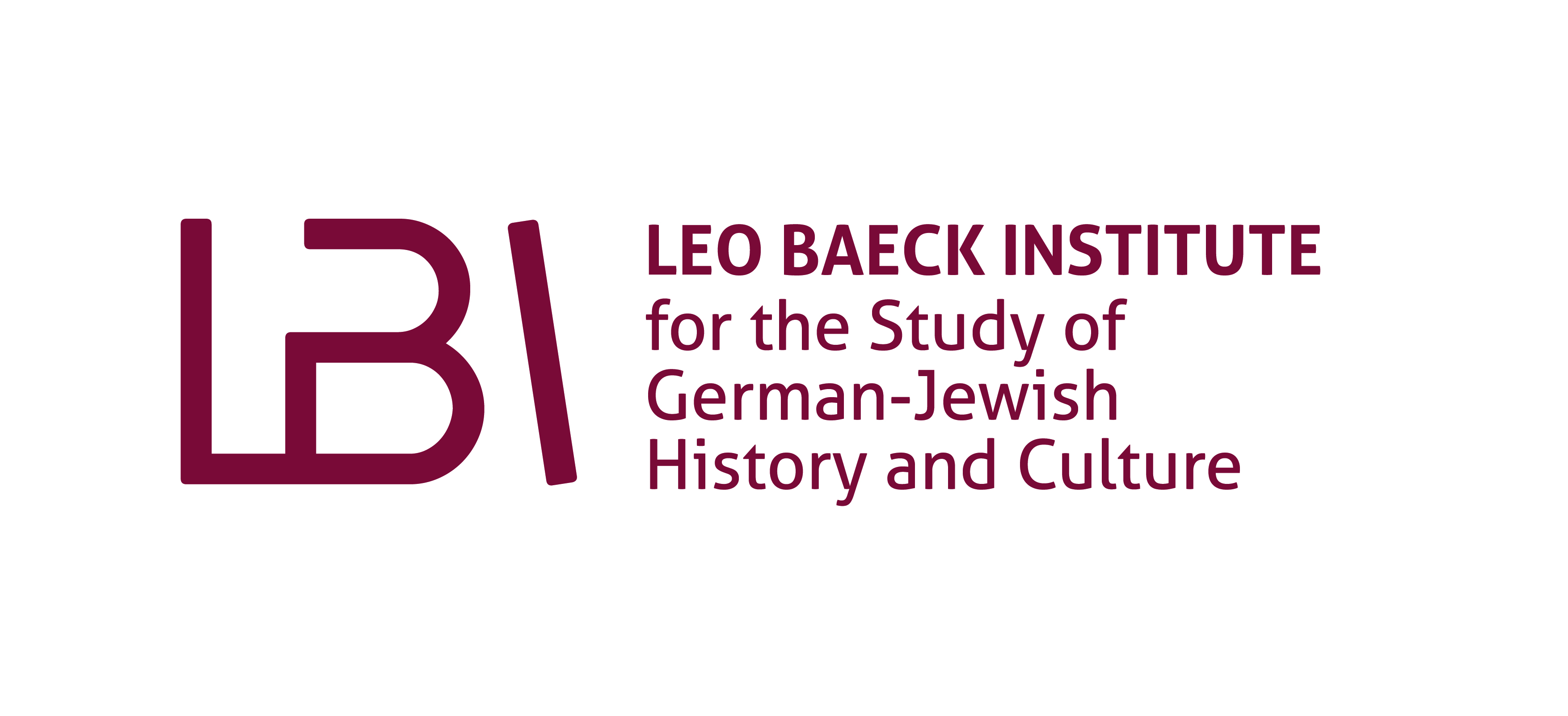
- Formation: 1955; 71 years ago
- Founders: Hannah Arendt; Martin Buber; Siegfried Moses; Gershom Scholem; Ernst Simon; Robert Weltsch
- Type: Research institute
- Location(s): New York City Jerusalem London
- International President: Michael Brenner
- Affiliations: Leo Baeck Institute New York, Leo Baeck Institute Jerusalem, Leo Baeck Institute London
- Website: Leo Baeck Institute: New York/Berlin; Jerusalem; London

The Leo Baeck Institute, established in 1955, is an international research institute with centres in New York City, London, Jerusalem and Berlin, that are devoted to the study of the history and culture of German-speaking Jewry. The institute was founded in 1955 by a consortium of influential Jewish scholars including Hannah Arendt, Martin Buber and Gershom Scholem. The Leo Baeck Medal has been awarded since 1978 to those who have helped preserve the spirit of German-speaking Jewry in culture, academia, politics, and philanthropy.

== Organizational structure ==
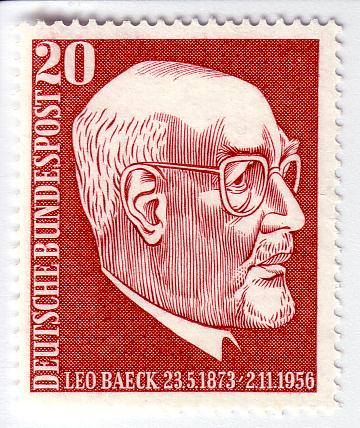
Commemorative stamp of Leo Baeck

The Leo Baeck Institute is made up of three independent international institutes, as well as two Berlin centres, and two Berlin working groups that are governed by the Leo Baeck Institute International board:

- Leo Baeck Institute New York/Berlin
- Leo Baeck Institute Jerusalem
- Leo Baeck Institute London
- Berlin centres:
  - Leo Baeck Institute New York – Berlin office
  - Leo Baeck Institute Archives at the Jewish Museum Berlin
- Berlin working groups:
  - Freunde und Förderer des LBI e.V.
  - Wissenschaftliche Arbeitsgemeinschaft des LBI in Deutschland

=== History ===
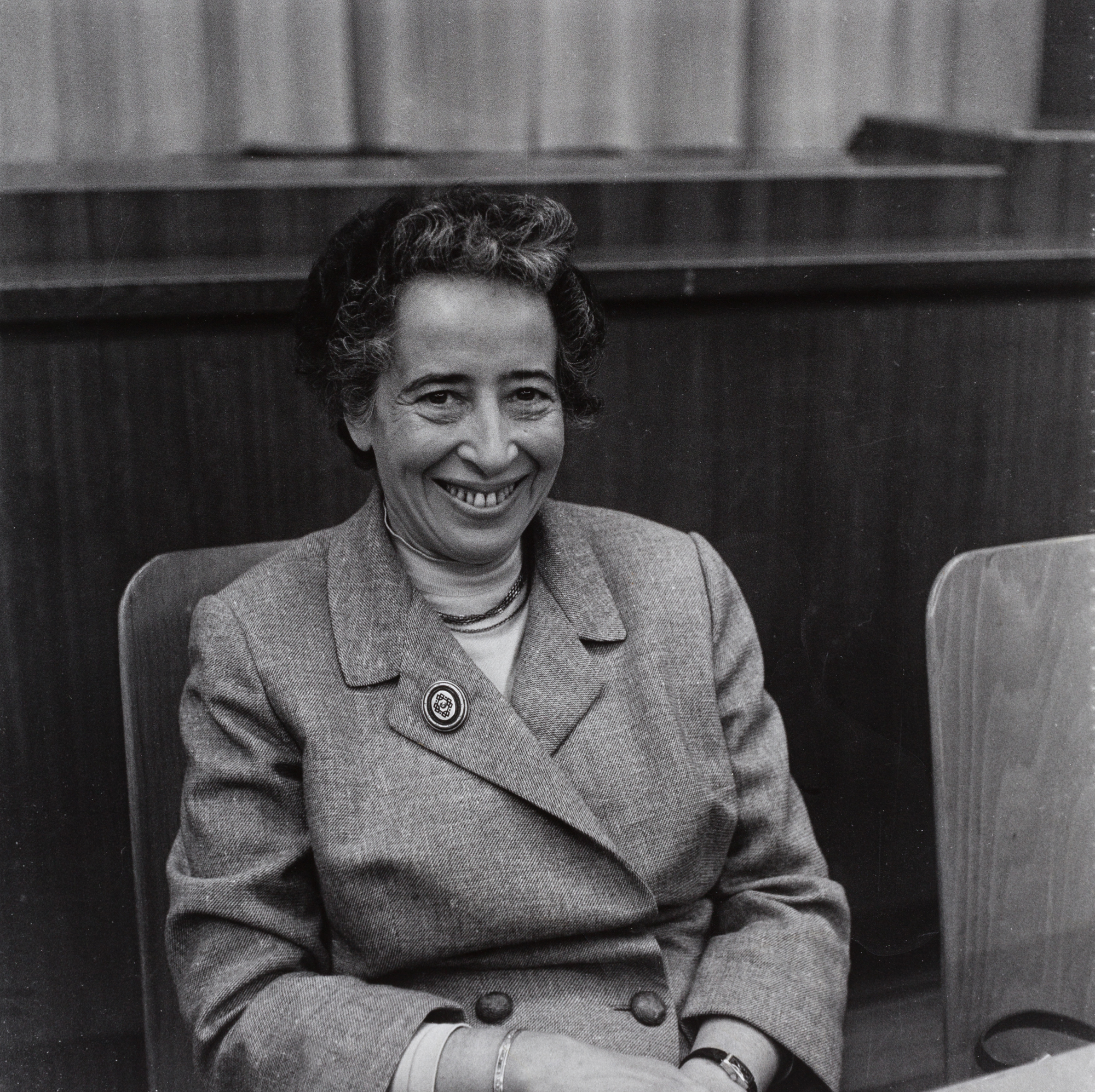
Hannah Arendt

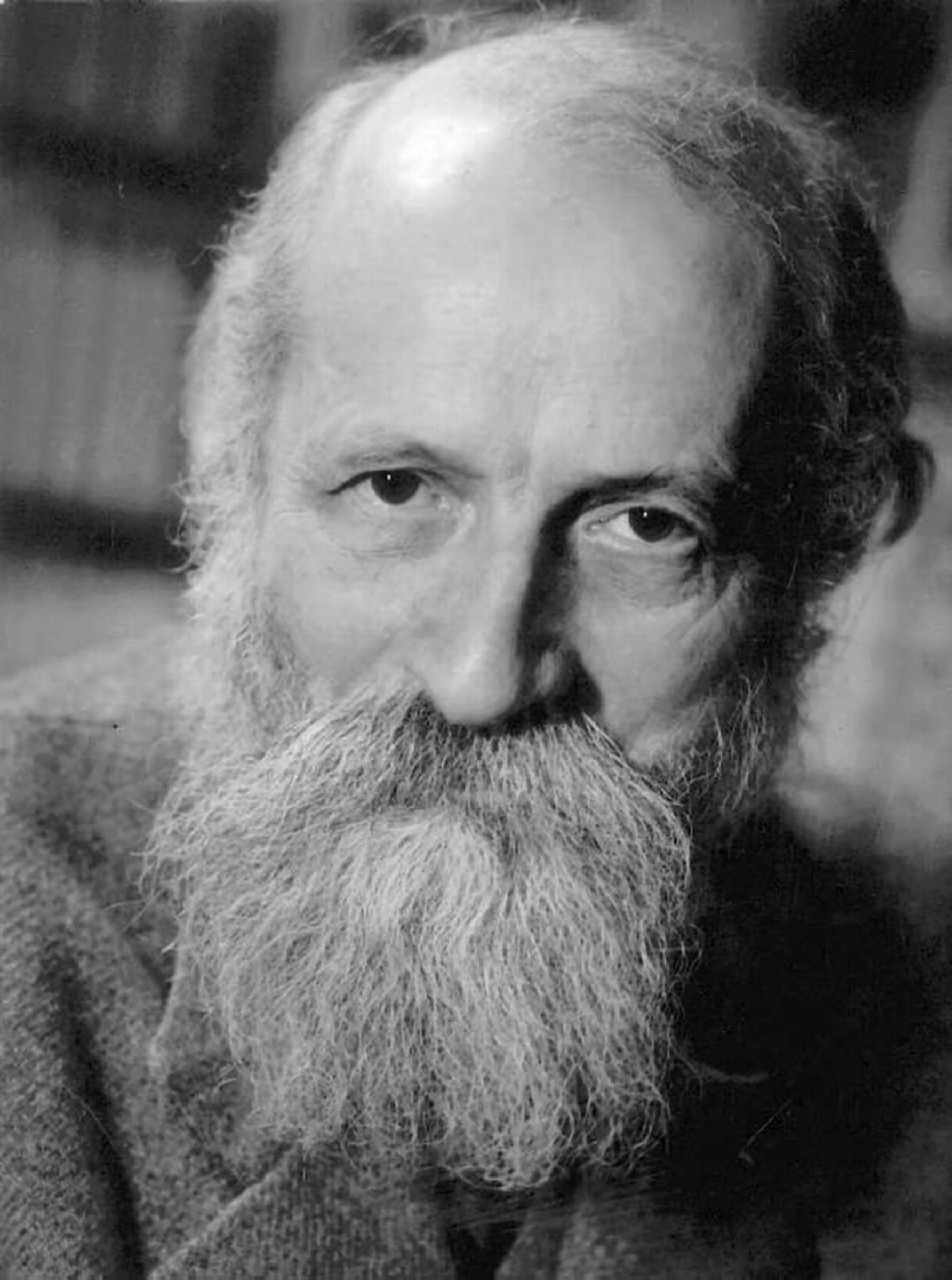
Martin Buber

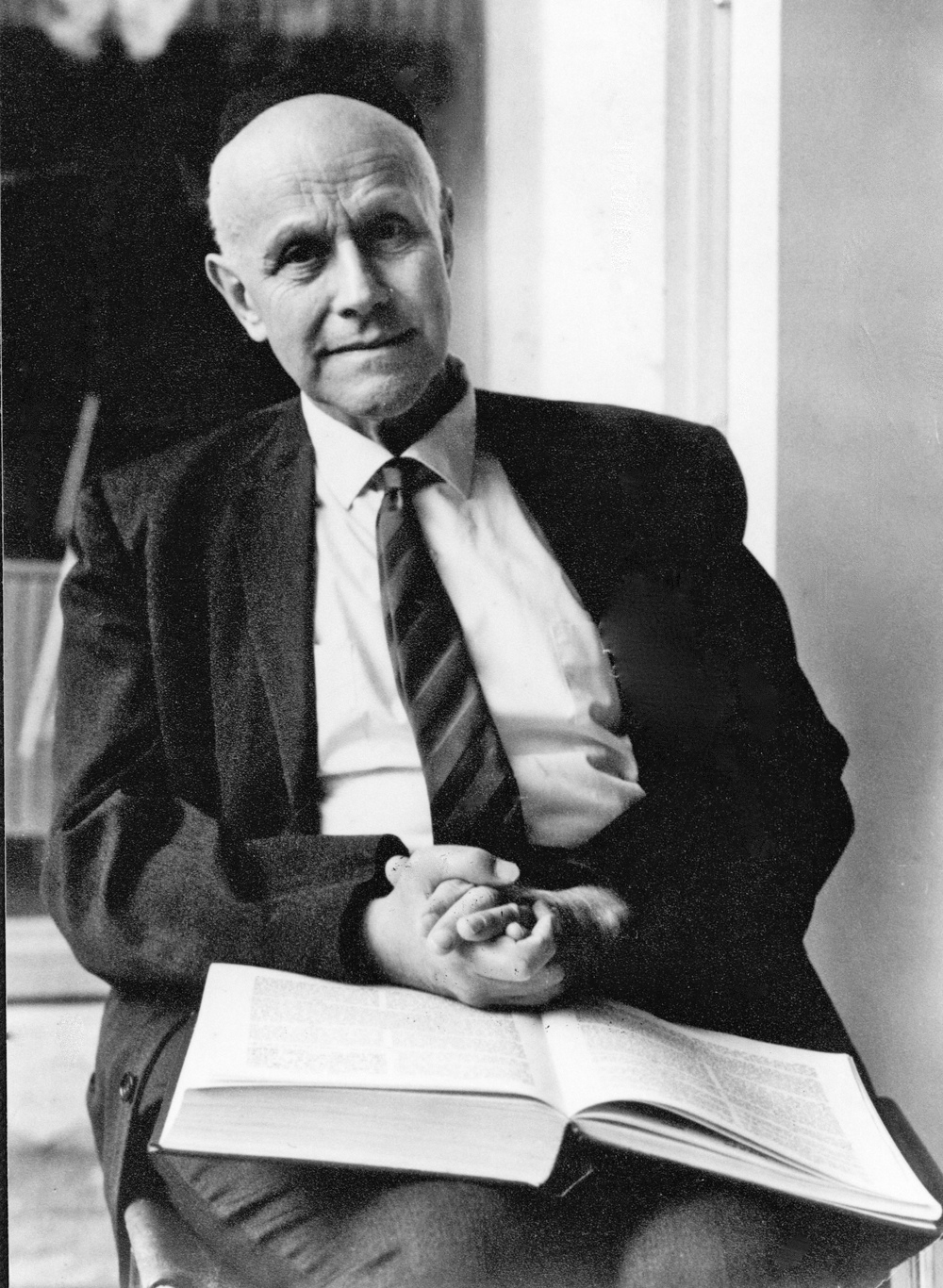
Ernst Simon

In the beginning of the 1950s some of the most influential Jewish scholars from Germany met in Jerusalem to discuss what form the Leo Baeck Institute would take. The founding conference took place from May 25–31, 1955; Martin Buber, Ernst Simon, and Gershom Scholem were some of the intellectual heavyweights present.

Most attendees as well as the personalities steering the institute had known each other before their flight from Germany through organizations such as the Central-Verein deutscher Staatsbürger jüdischen Glaubens and the Zionist Federation of Germany. Others had held positions with the Reichsvertretung der Deutschen Juden (formed under Leo Baeck's direction, and later renamed the Reichsvereinigung der Juden in Deutschland).

It was initially assumed that this project would take the form of a long-term historical project, preparing a comprehensive work on the history of German Jewry. With the expectation that this would not last more than a decade, institute members concentrated entirely on research projects and filling in the history of German-speaking Jewry from the Enlightenment to the Nazi seizure of power.

The Leo Baeck Institute was created in 1955 at the conference in Jerusalem. It was founded as a board that was made up of two governing bodies, a research and publication board, and an administrative board. It was founded internationally, with multiple locations made up of three independent branches. It is named in honor of its international president, Leo Baeck, the senior Rabbi of Berlin in Germany's Weimar Republic, and the last leader of the Jewish community under the Nazis. The Leo Baeck Institute, New York, was founded in 1955, at the same time as the parent organization, and is the United States branch of the organization.

It is now a central umbrella organization focused on the study of the history and culture of German-speaking Jewry. The Leo Baeck Institute International board coordinates the activities of all three branches, and each branch reports at annual international board meetings about their research and publication projects.

=== Leadership ===
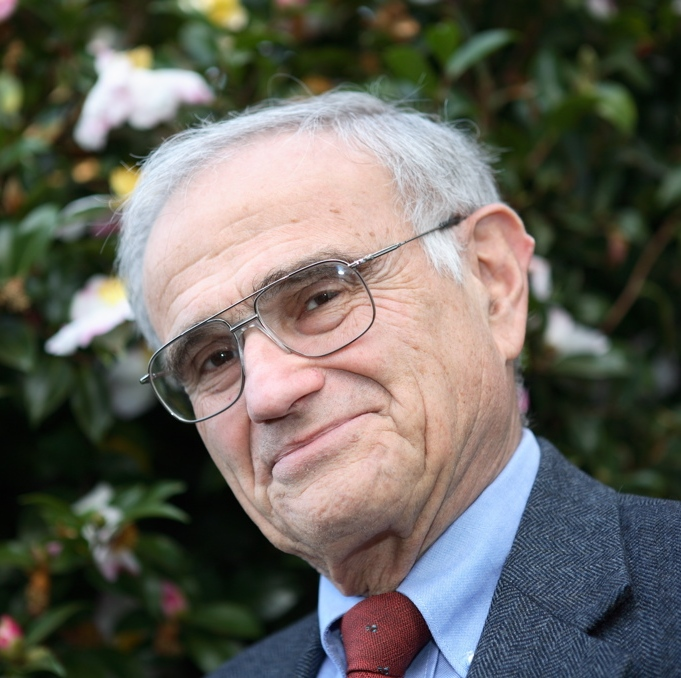
Michael A. Meyer

Presidents of Leo Baeck Institute International, the umbrella organization of the institute, have been:

- 1955–1956: Leo Baeck
- 1956–1974: Siegfried Moses
- 1974–1992: Max Grünewald
- 1992–2013: Michael A. Meyer
- 2013–present: Michael Brenner

== Leo Baeck Institute New York/Berlin ==
The Leo Baeck Institute New York in Manhattan includes a library, an archive, an art collection, and an exhibition centre. Its offices and collections are housed in the Center for Jewish History, a centralized partnership with other Jewish organizations that share one location, with separate governing bodies and finances, but collocate resources, in New York City.

- Leo Baeck Institute New York’s library collection: 80,000 volumes which range from collected works associated with the 16th century Reuchlin-Pfefforkorn debate over the banning of Jewish books to recent scholarship in the field of German-Jewish studies.
- Leo Baeck Institute archive: Over 4,000 linear feet of family papers, community histories, personal correspondence, genealogical materials, and business and public records of German-speaking Jews from the 18th century to the post-WWII era.
- Leo Baeck Institute art collection: 8,000 pieces of art that include works created or collected by German-speaking Jews from the 16th through the 20th centuries

Additionally, Leo Baeck Institute New York administers several fellowships for scholars working in the field of German-Jewish history, and produces exhibitions and public programming related to German-Jewish history.

It also awards the Leo Baeck Medal annually which is the highest recognition the institute bestows upon those who have helped preserve the spirit of German-speaking Jewry in culture, academia, politics, and philanthropy.

== Leo Baeck Institute Jerusalem ==
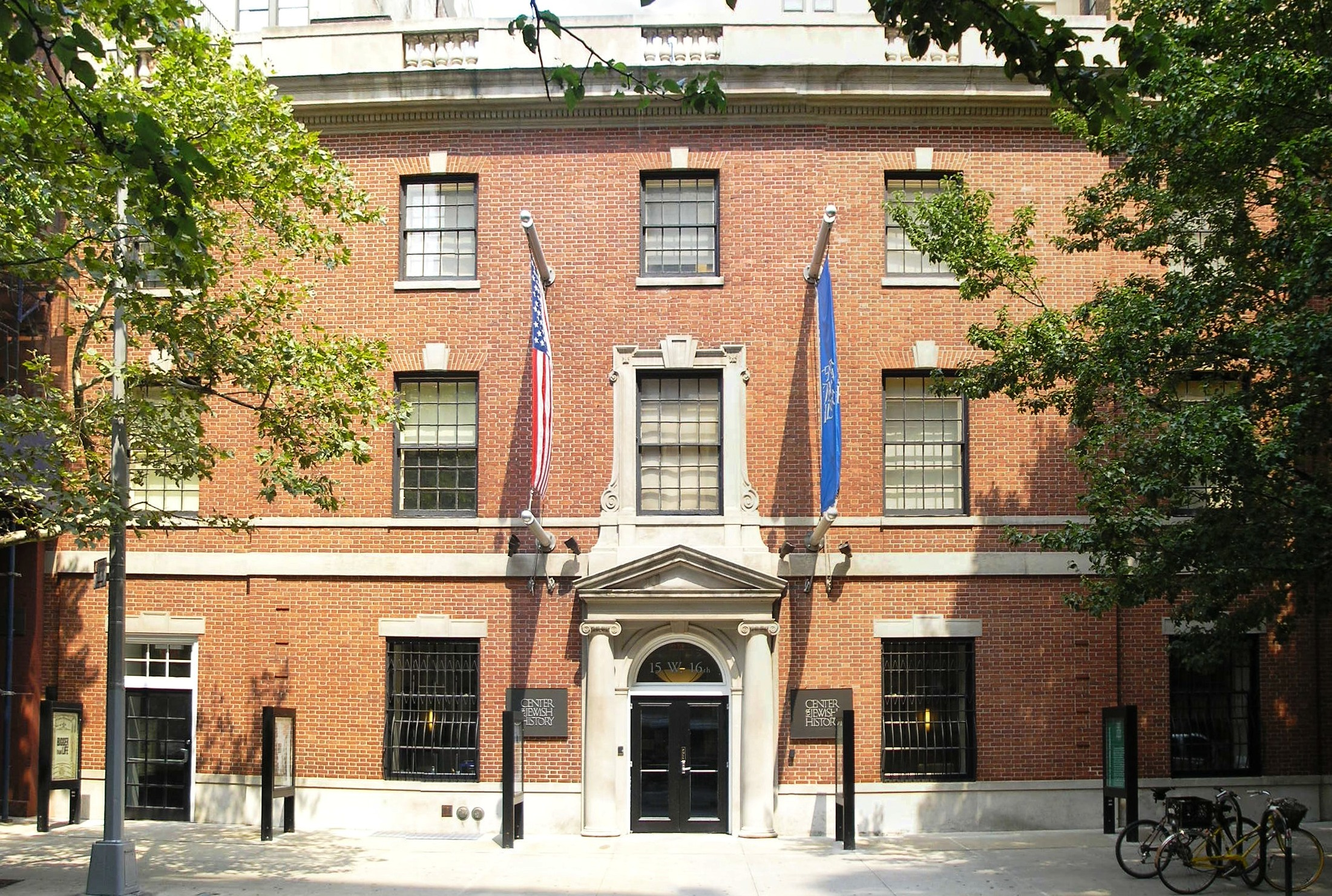
Center for Jewish History, which houses LBI New York

As the second generation took over, the LBI Jerusalem transformed from a memorial community to a research centre. Almost all members of the LBI Jerusalem’s second generation were professional historians. Most had left Germany as children or adolescents, and had either little or no share at all in the founders' memories. For this reason the “memorial function” of the historiography lost significance. In its place came more strictly scholarly aspirations.

Through publications, scholarly seminars, academic and cultural events, and an archive, the Leo Baeck Institute Jerusalem has been the leading venue for German-Jewish historiography and documentation in Israel. Its archives consist of a microfilm collection of Jewish newspapers from the 19th and 20th centuries, as well as a collection of family papers, genealogical materials, and community histories.

== Leo Baeck Institute London ==
The Leo Baeck Institute London, founded in 1955, researches the history and culture of German-speaking Jewry from the 17th century to the present day. It aims to facilitate academic exchange, and to use the German and Central European Jewish experience from the 17th to the 21st centuries to help understand contemporary socio-political debates concerning immigration, minorities, integration, and civil rights, in particular in the UK. Between 2011 and 2024, the LBI London was based at Queen Mary University of London. In 2024, the institute moved to a central London location, where it is now affiliated with Birkbeck, University of London. The LBI London remains an independent institute.

=== Publications ===
The institute’s flagship publication, the Leo Baeck Institute Year Book (since 1956), is a leading international publication in the field of the history and culture of German-speaking Jews. Published by Oxford University Press with a circulation of over 2,000 copies, it publishes original research on the cultural, economic, political, social, and religious history of German-speaking Jews. The Leo Baeck Institute Year Book Essay Prize is awarded annually to an early-career researcher writing on the history or culture of German-speaking Jewry. In addition to its Year Book, the LBI London publishes monographs and edited volumes in German and English. Its two series, Schriftenreihe wissenschaftlicher Abhandlungen des Leo Baeck Instituts, in German, and German Jewish Cultures, in English, cover the period from the Enlightenment to the contemporary era with a special focus on European Jewish history.

=== Academic programmes and events ===
The institute organises a range of events, such as international conferences and a public programme of lectures and workshops, often in collaboration with other UK or international organizations. Events are aimed at a broad audience.

A Leo Baeck Fellowship Programme (in collaboration with the Studienstiftung des deutschen Volkes) was created in 2005 to support doctoral candidates in German-Jewish studies. The programme includes bi-annual seminars during which Fellows discuss their research with senior academics in the field. Up to 12 fellowships are awarded each year.

== Digital collections ==
=== DigiBaeck ===
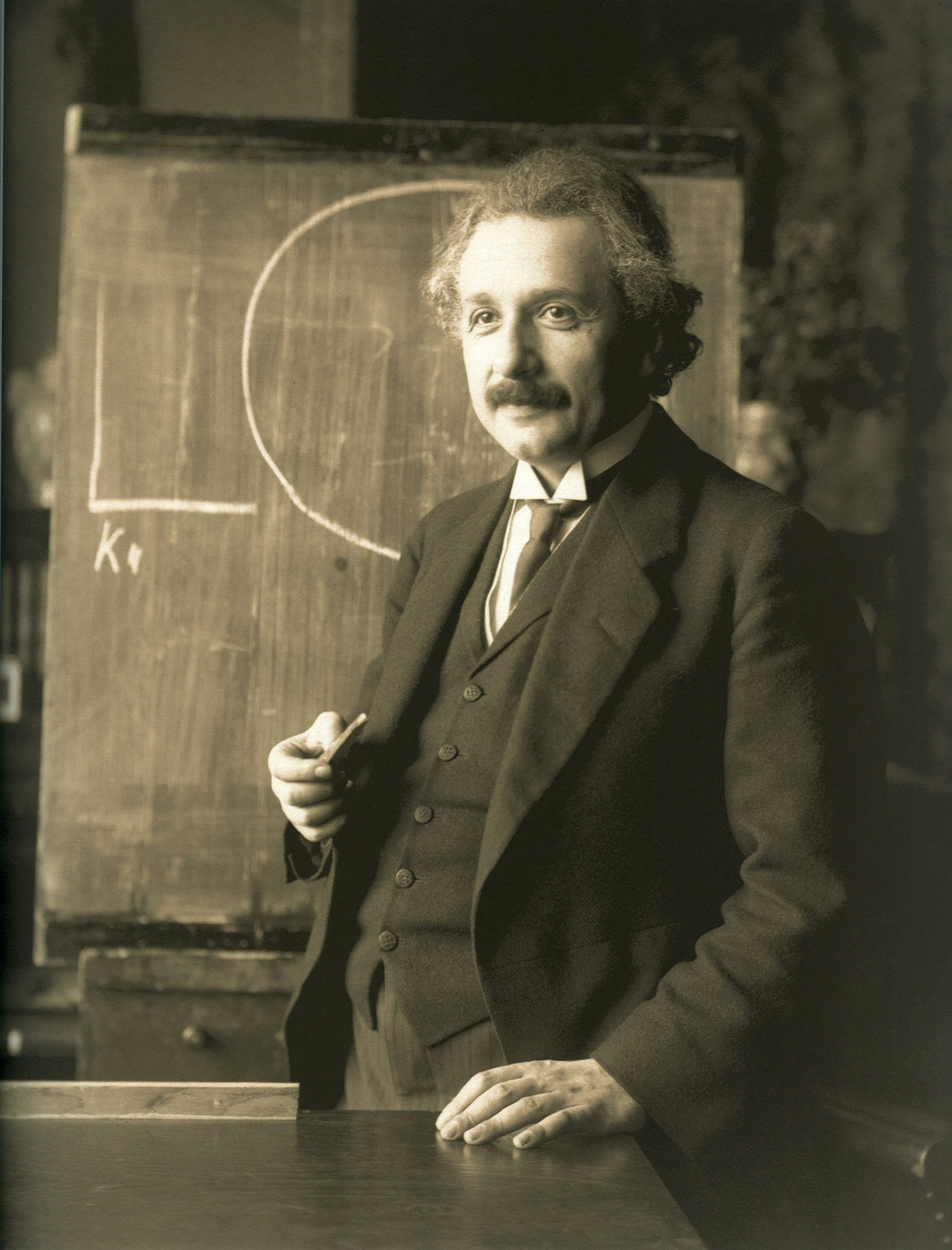
Albert Einstein

In 2012, Leo Baeck Institute New York announced that it had digitized the majority of its archival holdings, as well as large segments of its art and library collections. Among the over 3.5 million digital images available through the online catalog, known as DigiBaeck, include:

- Albert Einstein: Personal papers and photographs
- Franz Rosenzweig, philosopher and theologian: Diaries and correspondence including writings related to his landmark translation of the Hebrew Bible into German (1926-1929) with Martin Buber
- Joseph Roth, journalist and novelist: Original manuscripts
- Constantin Brunner, philosopher: Entire estate and periodicals including the émigré journal Aufbau

Leo Baeck Institute New York partnered with the Internet Archive non-profit digital library that offers permanent storage of and free public access to digitized materials to complete the project.

=== Freimann Collection ===
The Freimann Collection of books related to the Wissenschaft des Judentums (in English: Science of Judaism) is another digitization project. Working in coordination with Frankfurt University Library, the Leo Baeck Institute library located about 2,000 volumes in its collections that were missing from the Frankfurt Library’s collection of Judaica created by curator Aron Freimann in the 1920s, and were able to reconstruct the collection. The project was funded by a joint grant from the U.S. National Endowment for the Humanities and the German Research Foundation (Deutsche Forschungsgemeinschaft – DFG).

== Notable publications ==
- Arendt, Hannah, Richard Winston, and Clara Winston. Liliane Weissberg. Rahel Varnhagen: The Life of a Jewess. London: Leo Baeck Institute, 1957. Revised edition - Baltimore: Johns Hopkins University Press, 1997. ISBN 978-0-801-85587-0 OCLC 36485817
- Meyer, Michael A., Michael Brenner, Avraham Barkai, Paul Mendes Flohr, ed. German-Jewish History in Modern Times, Vol. 1-4. New York: Columbia University Press, 1996. ISBN 978-0-231-07478-0 OCLC 34473360 English translation of Deutsch-jüdische Geschichte in der Neuzeit.
- Meyer, Michael A., Mordekhai Broier, Mîk̲ā'ēl Greṣ, Michael Brenner, Steven M. Lowenstein, and Avraham Barḳai. Deutsch-jüdische Geschichte in der Neuzeit 1 1. München: Beck, 2000. ISBN 978-3-406-45941-2 OCLC 643081152

== See also ==
- Leo Baeck Medal
- Center for Jewish History
- American Jewish Historical Society

== Bibliography ==
- Hoffmann, Christhard, ed. (2008). Preserving the Legacy of German Jewry: A History of the Leo Baeck Institute, 1955–2005 (Schriftenreihe wissenschaftlicher Abhandlungen des Leo Baeck Instituts, Bd. 70.). Tübingen: Mohr Siebeck. ISBN 978-3-161-49668-4. OCLC 257584531.
  - Hoffmann, Christhard. "The Founding of the Leo Baeck Institute, 1945–1955". In Hoffmann (2008), pp. 15–58.
  - Nattermann, Ruth. "Diversity within Unity: The Community of Founders". In Hoffmann (2008), pp. 59–100.
  - Pomerance, Audrey. "Coordination, Confrontation and Cooperation: The International Board of the Leo Baeck Institute". In Hoffmann (2008), pp. 237–262.
