= American Sephardi Federation =

Sephardic jewish organization

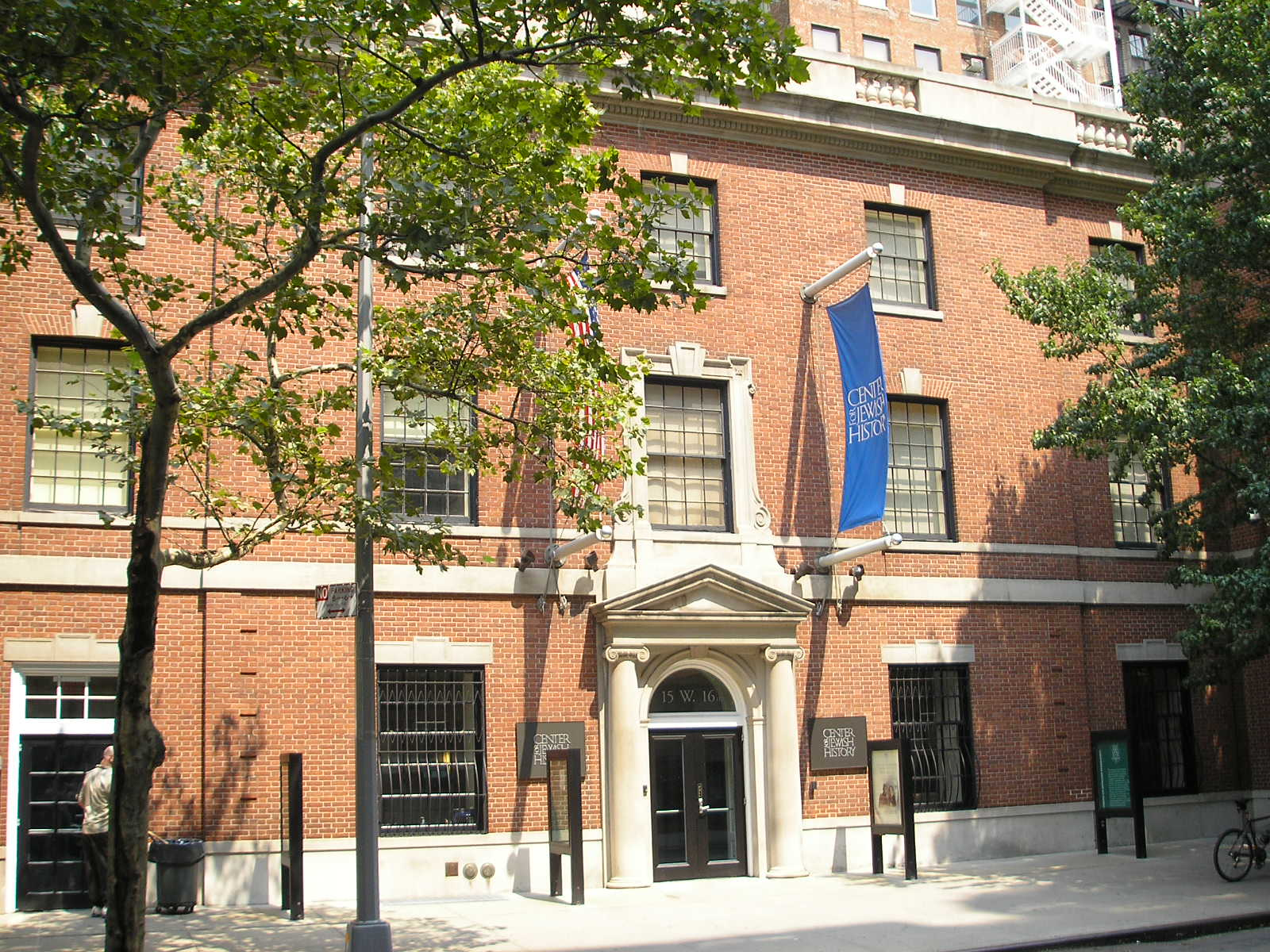
- ASF at the Center for Jewish History on 16th Street
- Formation: 1973
- Location: 15 West 16th Street, Manhattan, New York, United States
- Coordinates: 40.738047°N 73.993821°W
- Website: American Sephardi Federation

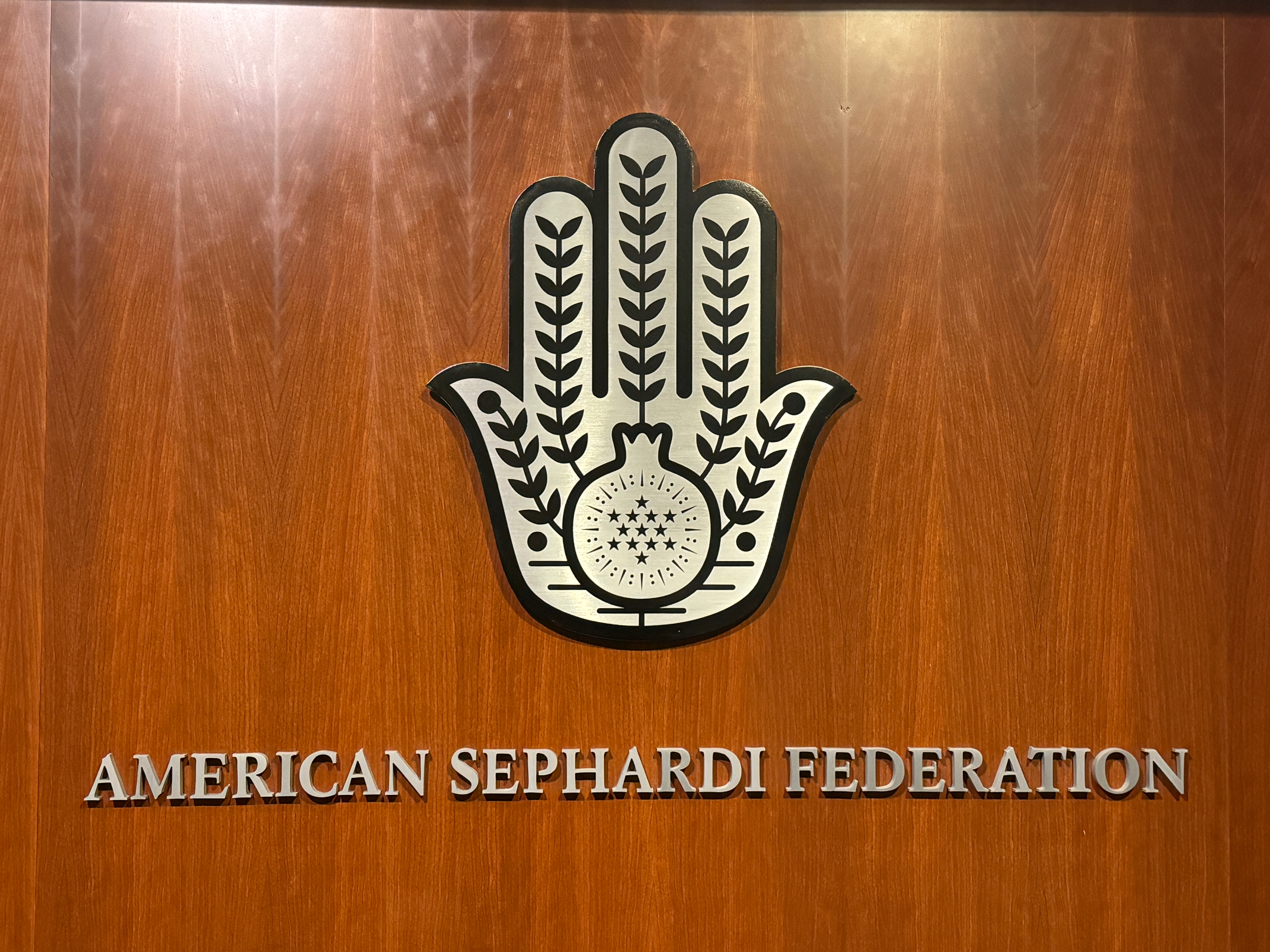
American Sephardi Federation

The American Sephardi Federation, a founding member of the Center for Jewish History, is a non-profit Jewish organization that strengthens and organizes the religious and cultural activities of Sephardic Jews, preserves Sephardic heritage, tradition and culture in the United States, and assists in the publication of books and literature dealing with the Sephardic culture and tradition. The federation also works to further awareness of the former existence of large Jewish communities in the Muslim and Arab world.

== Activities ==
The federation exists to "promote and preserve the spiritual, historical, cultural and social traditions of all Sephardic communities as an integral part of Jewish heritage" in the United States, and the goal of its founding conference was to "dedicate itself to revitalize the Sephardi culture and heritage in the U.S. and to aid the underprivileged population of the State of Israel". The federation's annual conferences, which also publish a number of reports about the work of the organization and issues related to Sephardic Jewry in the United States, are held in various locations throughout the United States and serve as a cultural reminder of the Middle East and African roots of the movement.

Its role in the Center for Jewish History is to serve as the only partner totally focused on the Jews of the Iberian Peninisula, North Africa, the Balkans, Middle East and Asia. In 2000, when the Center for Jewish History opened to the public, the federation opened what was then the only dedicated Sephardic exhibition space in North America in the center's new location.

One of the most important functions of the federation was its role in the lives of Sephardic youth. The first National ASF Youth Convention was held in Atlanta in November 1973, and was attended by more than 450 people. The federation's youth education programs also help to ensure the continued growth and vibrancy of the Sephardic culture.

When the U.S. Senate began to look into the issue of Jews fleeing Arab areas in the Middle East, the federation was involved with their research about the more than 800,000 Jews that chose to leave their homes at the time. In connection with a number of other groups worldwide, the federation has been involved with efforts to obtain information from those affected.

The American Sephardi Federation is the founder of the NY Sephardic Jewish Film Festival which honors important sephardic personalities with the Pomegranate Award. Since 2017, they have also been hosting the annual New York Ladino Day which "aims to celebrate and elevate Ladino culture in New York and throughout the world".

== History ==
Although formed in 1952 as a branch of the World Sephardi Federation, the American Sephardi Federation remained relatively inactive until it was officially organized in 1973, after which it was established as a national organization and was recognized exempt from Federal income taxation under §501(c)(3) of the Internal Revenue Code in May 1974.

In 2002, the Sephardic House, which had been sharing space with the federation at the Center for Jewish History joined with the federation. The two now operate as one under the name, American Sephardi Federation/Sephardic House (ASF/SH), as a national Jewish organization with local chapters. With this merger, ASF/SH has focused its activities on cultural events, scholarly endeavors and book publishing.
