= Schüler-Springorum =

Schüler-Springorum is a surname. Notable people with the surname include:

- Horst Schüler-Springorum (1928–2015), German professor of jurisprudence
- Stefanie Schüler-Springorum (born 1962), German historian

== See also ==
- Schuler
- Springorum
