= Gertrud Schubart-Fikentscher =

- Born: Gertrud Klara Rosalie Fikentscher; 23 December 1896; Zwickau, German Empire
- Died: 24 March 1985 (aged 88); Halle, East Germany
- Education: Friedrich Wilhelm University; Humboldt University of Berlin
- Known for: First professor of Law in Germany
- Spouse: Wilhelm Schubart (m. 1928; died 1960)

Gertrud Schubart-Fikentscher (23 December 1896 – 24 March 1985) became Germany's first female professor of Law in September 1948, and remained the country's only female university law professor - after 1957 an emeritus (retired) law professor - for seventeen years. She taught at the University of Halle. By the time she received and accepted her professorship she was a few months short of her fifty-second birthday, reflecting a somewhat indirect career trajectory, her having grown up in a country where the educational system was not set up to enable women either to study or teach at any university.

== Life ==
=== Provenance and early years ===
Gertrud Klara Rosalie Fikentscher was born into a Protestant family in Zwickau, where her father successfully ran a small family business in the manufacturing sector. Between 1903 and 1913 she attended the "Höhere Bürgerschule" girls' school in Zwickau, after which she received further tuition privately for the next few years. Meanwhile World War I broke out in 1914. In 1916 she left her parents' home and relocated to Berlin where she lived with relatives. She undertook a twelve-month traineeship in child welfare at the "Charlottenburger Seminar des Vereins Jugendhilfe". Over the next few years she worked as a school care-worker and in other child welfare jobs, alternating or combining her work with periods of training. Between 1919 and 1921 she was a student at the Alice Salomon Women's Social Work Academy (subsequently renamed) where in July 1921 she completed the national exams in welfare care, receiving a coveted "very good" commendation in respect of her exam results. Thus qualified, in September 1921 she accepted an appointment as head of the "Youth Court Assistance" ("Jugendgerichtshilfe") for central Berlin. Over the next few years her work gave her valuable hand-on experience of the youth justice system which awoke her interest in the Law more generally. Despite never having been entered for the Abitur (school leaving exams) which, once passed, opened the way for young men of her generation to move on to university-level education, the gender bias in the education system had been softened a little by the slaughter of war, and during the early 1920s Fikentscher was able to attend law lectures at Berlin's Friedrich Wilhelm University as a "guest attendee" ("Gasthörerin"). She passed the Prussian Culture Ministry "Culture Exam" which provided a belated alternative opening to university admission, and between 1924 and 1928, she studied Jurisprudence in Berlin.

In October 1928 she passed her Part I national law exams ("Staatsexamen") which under some circumstances might have preceded a traineeship with a law firm. It is not clear whether she ever contemplated that step. On 17 December 1928 she married her uncle, the leading scholar and internationally respected papyrologist, Wilhelm Schubart (1873-1960), whose first wife had died the previous April. Gertrud Fikenscher had known her uncle and his wife since moving to Berlin twelve years earlier, and it is likely that it was only on account of Schubart's encouragement that she had pursued her legal studies with such persistence. The newly married couple spent six months between April and November 1929 in Egypt together in connection with Wilhelm Schubart's papyrological researches. It was Wilhelm's sixth visit to Egypt and Gertrud's first (and only) stay in the country. Between 1929 and 1933, while her husband fulfilled his teaching contract at the university, Gertrud Schubart-Fikentscher pursued her own academic path.

=== Under National Socialism ===
She received her doctorate from the same university. Her doctoral supervisor was Ernst Heymann (whose entry in the Neue Deutsche Biographie she would subsequently contribute). Her dissertation was based on a study of the Brünner Schöffenbuch from which she had distilled a study of marriage law in the medieval period. She analysed the Roman Law basis for the medieval legal context and drew conclusions on the legal status of women as this had evolved in the Holy Roman Empire by and during the medieval period. Had she been pursuing a conventional academic career, her doctorate would have been followed a few years later by her Habilitation (higher academic degree). However, in January 1933 the Hitler government had taken power; they lost no time in transforming the country into a one- party dictatorship. There is no indication that Schubart-Fikentscher had been politically engaged up to this point, but sources nevertheless state that "on account of her political convictions" she was refused the opportunity to progress to a Habilitation degree.

Schubart-Fikentscher was nevertheless able to remain academically engaged. From 1935 she worked as a research assistant for the ambitious and scholarly Monumenta Germaniae Historica historical resources project, with which her doctoral supervisor Ernst Heymann was closely involved, and through which, that same year, her own doctoral dissertation was published in book form. Between 1935 and 1941 she established and led a working group in order to gather and catalogue "Bibliographical evidence on the legal status of women in the German Empire and Austria". Although she was closely involved with Berlin University, both on account of her work and through her husband, she appears to have been employed on a free-lance basis during this period. Between 1938 and 1940 she undertook research into "the development of German city privileges in East Europe". The resulting book, for which she received a prize from the Royal Prussian Academy of Arts and Sciences, was published in 1942 and became, according to at least one source, a "standard work" on the topic. Despite Schubart-Fikentscher's subsequent academic distinctions in the German Democratic Republic (1949-1989), it would remain banned there, however.

=== University of Leipzig ===
Between 1941 and 1943 Schubart-Fikentscher taught law studies at the so-called "Volkspflegeschule" (college) in Brandenburg. It was probably towards the end of 1943 that she moved with her husband back to Zwickau, where they stayed with relatives. The move was prompted by the destruction in of the library where Wilhelm Schubart, at this point in semi-retirement, was working and of their apartment in Berlin-Lichterfelde by British bombing. Between 1943 and 1946 she taught Civil Law and Legal History at the Leipzig University Law Faculty. Although she now had a teaching contract with a major university and was, to all intents and purposes, occupying a teaching chair, she was described as a "teaching chair representative" and did not, at this stage, hold a university professorship. One recurring explanation given for this was that the professorship in question was being held open for Hans Thieme who had been appointed to it in 1940 and then conscripted for Military service.

Her gender and evident lack of enthusiasm for the National Socialists was held against her, but Schubart-Fikentscher's record of academic research, following the publication of her doctoral dissertation in 1942, was nevertheless - at least in part - a matter of public record, and she enjoyed strong backing from Alfred Schultze (1864-1946 who, despite his age and virtual withdrawal from formal academic duties during the Hitler years, remained influential behind the scenes with members of the Leipzig University Law Faculty.

In May 1945 war ended and the Hitler dictatorship collapsed: after July 1945 Leipzig and the surrounding region were administered as part of the Soviet occupation zone. In May 1946, having joined the newly formed SED (party), Schubart-Fikentscher received from the University of Leipzig the habilitation (higher academic degree) that had not been available to her during the previous twelve years. A habilitation was normally only awarded in return for a new piece of academic research, but in this instance the university awarded her the degree on the basis of a monograph she had already written and published some years earlier during her further researches on the Brünner Schöffenbuch. German universities were by this time seriously run down, while the slaughter of war and mass emigration had left the entire region desperately short of working-age population. In 1948 Wilhelm Schubart was persuaded out of retirement to accept a professorship in Ancient History at the University of Leipzig. Hans Thieme, whose professorial chair she (informally) occupied, had ended the war as an army officer, and had in 1946 accepted a professorship at the University of Göttingen (in the British occupation zone), but still the Leipzig university authorities hesitated over how to manage his professorship and appoint in his place the woman who had been doing the job since 1943.

=== University of Halle ===
At around the same time as her husband accepted his Leipzig professorship, Gertrud Schubart-Fikentscher was offered a full professorship in Civil Law and Legal History at the University of Halle, a short train ride to the north-west of Leipzig (and also part of the Soviet zone). She took up her new appointment on 1 September 1948, becoming in the process the first female in German speaking Europe to occupy a professorial teaching chair in a university law faculty. (Note: The achievement, in 1948, of becoming a law professor in Germany despite being female was a remarkable one. It was only in 1965 that Anne-Eva Brauneck accepted the newly created teaching chair in "Criminal Law and Criminology" at the University of Gießen, becoming thereby the second female university law professor in Germany.) The Halle appointment meant turning down the offer of a professorship from the University of Heidelberg which she received at around the same time. Between 1948 and 1950 the university authorities at Leipzig now made strenuous efforts to persuade her to return and accept an equivalent position there, but Schubart-Fikentscher preferred to stick with her Halle professorship.

During the years till her retirement in 1957 Gertrud Schubart-Fikentscher had a successful teaching career at University of Halle, also taking her turn with administrative duties. She served as dean of faculty during 1950/51 and as Director of the Institute for Civil Law and Legal History from 1951. Those of her students who later achieved academic eminence on their own account included Rolf Lieberwirth, whose doctorate she supervised, and who in 1969 took over her former professorship at Halle.

=== Retirement and Thomasius ===
Her former student, Professor Rolf Lieberwirth, was invited by an interviewer to say a few words about Gertrud Schubart-Fikentscher

"Prof. Schubart-Fikentscher was an extraordinarily thorough woman. There could be no short-cuts when it came to academic research: everything had to be proven. One thing she did, which thank God I have continued: she directed us to the sources and said, 'That's the most important thing'".
"Frau Schubart-Fikentscher war eine außerordentlich gründliche Frau. In der wissenschaftlichen Arbeit durfte nichts übersehen, alles musste bewiesen werden. Sie hat eines getan, was ich Gott sei Dank auch fortsetzen durfte: Sie hat uns auf die Quellen hingewiesen und hat gesagt: 'Das ist das Wichtigste'."

Rolf Lieberwirth interviewed at Halle in 2007 by Albrecht Cordes

After her retirement Schubart-Fikentscher continued her research on legal history. Topics to which she turned included the legal status of fools and bastards. She was also able to devote more time to her long-standing interest in the enlightenment pioneer-philosopher Christian Thomasius, a study which she pursued well into her old age. Fortunately for her continuing researches, the university library, to which she remained a frequent visitor, had survived the destruction of war. In addition, after her promotion to a full professorship, she had found herself in the unusual position of being part of marriage that was in receipt of two professorial salaries/pensions. Although the slaughter of war forced East Germany to become a European pace setter in terms of the number of married women in full-time employment, it was highly unusual for both partners in a marriage to be as well paid as the Schubarts, and during the 1950s she wrote to second-hand bookshops across the country in search of books on topics that interested her. Second-hand books on legal history and philosophy were evidently cheap and plentiful, and she acquired a significant private research library. (The books subsequently found their way to the Halle university library as part of her literary estate.)

She also purchased a fine portrait of Thomasius from the Goltz family of Greifswald. It was not entirely clear how it had come into the hands of the Goltz family. The result of her purchasing activities during the 1950s meant that following her retirement, despite living modestly, she was well provided for, not just on account of her university pension. After her death the portrait of Thomasius was bequeathed to the university on the express condition that it would be kept on display in the department of Legal History.

By 1985 she was revered among legal academics colleagues as something of a "grand old lady". That year she suffered a serious accident as a result of which she was confined to bed. She died shortly afterwards.

== Memberships and recognition ==
In 1948/49 Schubart-Fikentscher was elected a corresponding member of the Monumenta Germaniae Historica. A year later she was elected to membership of the Saxon Academy of Sciences and Humanities.

More unconventionally, in 1951 she resigned her membership of the Socialist Unity Party which, since its inception in April 1946, had emerged as the ruling party in a new kind of German one-party dictatorship in June 1951. It was, in the judgment of one commentator, a risky move, which she explained as follows:

"As a grown woman in my mid-50s I formed my own convictions, which most likely did not always conform to the party's expectations"

At least one source also makes mention of her having stood up for students and other members of the university who were persecuted on political grounds. Her status as Germany's only female law professor, combined with the assessment that she was not a dissident activist by temperament, seem to have protected her even after her party resignation, and she continued to teach until she reached retirement age in 1956. Her husband died in 1960 and in 1962 she received the GDR Patriotic Order of Merit in Bronze.

== Selected works ==
- Das Eherecht im Brünner Schöffenbuch, Stuttgart 1935, zugl. Diss. Univ. Berlin 1933;
- Römisches Recht im Brünner Schöffenbuch. Ein Beitrag zur Rezeptionsgeschichte. In: ZRG GA 65 (1947), 86–176;
- Goethes 56 Straßburger Thesen (vom 6. August 1771). Ein Beitrag zur Geschichte der deutschen Rechtswissenschaft, Weimar 1949;
- Ein neues Thomasius-Bild?. In: 450 Jahre Martin-Luther-Universität Halle-Wittenberg, Bd. 2, Halle 1952, 27–30;
- Hallesche Spruchpraxis. Consiliensammlung Hallescher Gelehrter aus dem Anfang des 18. Jahrhunderts (Thomasiana 3), Weimar 1960;
- Untersuchungen zur Autorschaft von Dissertationen im Zeitalter der Aufklärung (Sonderbände der Sächsischen Akademie der Wissenschaften zu Leipzig, phil.-hist. Klasse 114,5), Berlin 1970;
- Studienreform. Fragen von Leibniz bis Goethe (Sonderbände der Sächsischen Akademie der Wissenschaften zu Leipzig, phil.-hist. Klasse 116,4), Berlin 1973;
- Goethes Amtliche Schriften. Eine rechtsgeschichtliche Untersuchung (Sonderbände der Sächsischen Akademie der Wissenschaften zu Leipzig, phil.-hist. Klasse 119, 2), Berlin 1977;
- Christian Thomasius. Seine Bedeutung als Hochschullehrer am Beginn der deutschen Aufklärung (Sonderbände der Sächsischen Akademie der Wissenschaften zu Leipzig, phil.-hist. Klasse 119, 4), Berlin 1977;
