= Monika Richarz =

German historian (born 1937)

Monika Richarz (born 8 June 1937) is a German historian. The focus of her work is on the social history of the Jewish minority in Germany, and the relationships between the Germans and the Jews. In talking about her area of expertise, she likes to explain that there is a whole lot more to "Jewish history" than Auschwitz.

Between 1993 and her retirement in 2001 she was the director of the Hamburg based "Institute for the History of German Jews" ("Institut für die Geschichte der deutschen Juden"). In 2022 Camden House published an English translation of her dissertation Der Eintritt der Juden in die akademischen Berufe under the title German Jews and the University, 1678–1848.

== Life ==
=== Childhood in wartime ===
Monika Richarz was born in Berlin, and spent the first part of her childhood in the relatively quiet Zehlendorf quarter. Her father (like his father before him) was a mechanical engineer. When World War II came, slightly more than two years after Monika's birth, he avoided conscription because of his health. He worked, instead, for the Technical Emergency Assistance Service ("Technische Nothilfe"), which involved reinstating gas, electricity and water supplies after air-raids on the city. He never joined the Nazi Party, although his daughter later described her parents as Nazi "fellow travellers", not actively involved in Nazi crimes, but not actively distancing themselves from the government either. Monika's mother was a teacher of domestic sciences, and was also involved in teacher training.

In 1943 she and her mother were evacuated to Neuruppin, a small town a short distance to the north of Berlin. Later they moved again, going to live with her grandmother at Meiningen in Thuringia. It was therefore not in bombed out Berlin, but in small town Germany that at the age of 7 the child first experienced the horror of air-raids, first saw dead bodies being pulled out of rubble, and was first terrified by dive bombers on the walk to school. When war ended in 1945 Monika was summoned back to Berlin by her father. Back in Thuringia her sister was born soon afterwards, and in 1946 the family were reunited in Berlin-Zehlendorf. Although much of Berlin and the surrounding countryside were by now administered as the Soviet occupation zone, the western part of the city was subdivided into occupation zones controlled by British, US and French forces. Zehlendorf was in the US zone. Although she would participate in the student riots of 1968, Monika Richarz nevertheless retained many positive memories of the US occupation forces. She wore clothes donated by American Quakers and, with other children, became accustomed to asking "chocolate please" after gathering in front of a house in the neighbourhood that had been commandeered, and identified itself with a "No loitering" sign. During the next few years, within Berlin, the family were obliged to relocate frequently. Economically, however, as the rubble was cleared away, her father's skills were much prized, and he worked on reconstruction of the energy infrastructure in the eastern part of Berlin, not yet separated by the political, economic and physical barriers that would later divide the city according to the occupation zones established in 1945.

After October 1949 the Soviet occupation zone was relaunched as the German Democratic Republic and political differences between the two new Germanys became progressively harder to ignore. Monika's father resigned abruptly from his work in East Berlin after deciding he no longer wished to be placed under sustained pressure to join the recently created Socialist Unity Party (SED) which by this time was well on the way to becoming the ruling party in a new kind of one-party dictatorship, under Soviet sponsorship and subject to Soviet political and social constraints. He appears to have had no difficulty finding well paid work in West Berlin, where he later obtained a position as the director of a gas works. Monika was educated at a private school in the city. There were no books, and history was taught using hectograph copied sheets. The twentieth century was carefully excluded from the syllabus, but various earlier periods were studied intensively. She passed her school final exams ("Abitur") in 1956, which in principle cleared the way for admission to university level education. However, her father had died in 1954 and her mother had thereby become acutely aware of the need for women to be able to support themselves financially. Monika Richarz was persuaded to apply to train as a school teacher. Inwardly Richarz was not keen on this plan, and it was probably as a result of what today would be termed "passive resistance" that she successfully avoided being accepted as a trainee teacher.

=== Student ===
On some of her fellow students at the Free University

"It was very important for my subsequent life, because from now on I had a "normal" relationship with Jews.... Importantly, we had [at the university] students who came from emigrant families, from England, from the USA and from Israel, who had received a double message from their parents: Germany is the land of the killers, and Germany is that land of a superior culture... And so they had said to their parents, we will now take time to go to Germany to see for ourselves what the problem is. The parents were in a quandary, because naturally for them this involved a taboo, which opened the way for a wonderful act of rebellion against the parents."

"Das war für mein (weiteres) Leben sehr wichtig, weil ich von dieser Zeit an ein „normales“ Verhältnis zur Juden hatte…. Vor allen Dingen hatten wir dort Studenten, die aus Emigrantenfamilien kamen, aus England, aus den USA und aus Israel, die von ihren Eltern die double Message bekommen hatten: Deutschland ist das Land der Mörder und Deutschland ist das Land einer überlegenen Kultur… Und dann haben sie zu ihrer Eltern gesagt, wir gehen jetzt mal nach Deutschland und gucken mal selbst, was da los ist. Die Eltern waren einsetzt, denn für die war das natürlich ein Tabu, und so konnten sie wunderbar gegen die Eltern rebellieren."

Monika Richarz (from Beate Meyer's lengthy interview with Richarz, dated 22 August 2003)

Instead she enrolled at Bonn University. After an "orientation term" she switched from Bonn to the Free University of Berlin where she studied history and, in particular, medieval history. Shortly after embarking on her student career, in 1958, Richarz undertook a student exchange visit to Poland. The trip included Warsaw, Kraków and the nearby former concentration camp at Auschwitz. She was much affected. One of the things that most struck her, in 1958, was the contrasting approaches in Poland and in West Germany to the residuum from the destruction of the war and the murder of the Jews.

Recalling her return in 1958 from a student exchange visit to Poland

"I had seen [in Poland] everything which, as you might say, was always swept under the carpet in the Federal Republic [of West Germany]. 1958 was the time when the economic miracle moved up a gear. No one spoke about it – not even in the world of academic research – but in Poland you saw everywhere garlands of fresh flowers for Polish soldiers or civilians who had been shot, massacred, brought down, tortured in Gestapo cells; we saw Auschwitz, still not a museum, but apparently just as [the Nazis] had left it. These were powerful impressions. It was a shock! Then when I came back I checked out the lecture list, and discovered that there was a professor teaching Jewish history, and so I came to the seminars of Prof. Adolf Leschnitzer, otherwise known as Dolfi."

"Ich habe sozusagen alles gesehen, was in der Bundesrepublik immer unter den Teppich gekehrt wurde. 1958, das war die Zeit, als der wirtschaftliche Wiederaufbau sehr dynamisch zu werden begann. Niemand sprach davon, auch in der Forschung nicht … doch in Polen sah man überall Kränze, frische Blumen für polnische Soldaten oder Zivilisten, die von Deutschen erschossen, massakriert, umgebracht, in Gestapokellern gefoltert worden waren; wir sahen Auschwitz, das noch kein Museum war, sondern wirkte, als hätte man es verlassen. Das waren starke Eindrücke, und es war ein Schock! Als ich zurückkam, habe ich im Vorlesungsverzeichnis entdeckt, dass es einen Professor gab, der jüdische Geschichte lehrte, und so kam ich ins Seminar von Professor Adolf Leschnitzer, genannt Dolfi. "

Monika Richarz (from Beate Meyer's lengthy interview with Richarz, dated 22 August 2003)

The Free University, where she studied till successfully completing her degree in 1962, had an unusual, albeit brief, history, reflecting Berlin's wider political postwar tensions. Berlin's Humboldt University had ended up in the Soviet occupation zone in 1945, and was hurriedly but thoroughly modernised along Soviet principles. Following a series of student arrests and even, some said, executions, in 1947 students at the Humboldt demanded a university free from political influence. After several more months of largely low level confrontation between the students and the Soviet-backed authorities, a number of Berlin academics and politicians, eventually with the necessary backing of the US governor, General Clay, created an alternative free university in the US administered sector. The Free University's first lectures were delivered in November 1948. By the time Monika Richarz enrolled there were already 10,846 students. The recent date of the university's foundation meant that, unusually in Germany, it was institutionally unencumbered by the shadows of a Nazi past. Its pioneering spirit attracted large numbers of overseas students and a number of returning high profile German academics who had been forced into exile for reasons of politics and race during the Nazi years. One of these was Adolf Leschnitzer (1899-1980), who after 1939 had built a successful academic career in New York, but who combined this, after 1952, with a post as a visiting professor at the Free University of Berlin, where he taught for one term each year over a period of twenty years. Between 1957 and 1972 Leschnitzer was Honorary Professor for Jewish History and Culture. One of his students was Monika Richarz. Indeed, she would continue to attend his seminars till 1972, one of just two women in his (never large) seminar group. Accurately summarizing Leschnitzer's career progression, she later described him as "a mixture of German secondary school teacher and American professor", while going on to add that for her, and for post war fellow students of Jewish provenance, he had unlocked the door to a completely new way of understanding Jewish culture.

In August 1961 Richarz was still studying for her history degree. That month the sudden appearance of the "Anti-fascist protection wall" had an immediate personal impact on fellow students from East Berlin who found their route to the Free University being blocked. Spontaneously the members of Prof. Leschnitzer's seminar group became people smugglers, organising false identity papers and smuggling friends, hidden under cars, into West Berlin. It was, Richarz later reflected, "all very very dramatic". The next year she completed her exams and embarked on a probationary year as a trainee teacher. Her mother's admonitions on the need for financial security had had their effect. However, after the excitement of university life, she found her days in school "deadly boring", and the pro-Nazi nostalgia ("braune Gesinnung") displayed by several colleagues she accompanied on a school expedition to Obersalzberg, "scandalous".

=== Academic and scholar ===
In 1964 she managed to negotiate a part time post at the Berlin Historical Commission ("Historische Kommission zu Berlin"), where she remained as a researcher till 1969.

Monika Richarz submitted her doctoral dissertation in 1969. She had visited no fewer than 26 archives. She was not always well received. Many archivists suspected that anyone researching German Jewish history was simply bent on gathering evidence of anti-semitism. She received her doctorate in 1970 for a piece of work on the entry of Jews into the academic professions ("Eintritt der Juden in die akademischen Berufe"). The qualification, awarded by the Free University of Berlin, came with a coveted "magna cum laude" citation. After this, for two years between 1970 and 1972, she was employed by the West German Bundestag (national parliament) as a researcher in connection with an exhibition being staged in West Berlin in the "old Reichstag building" (as it was known at that time). The exhibition, presented under the title "Questions on German history" ("Fragen an die Deutsche Geschichte"), was timed to coincide with the centenary of German unification.

On collecting memories from the German Jewish community in New York

"At The institute I lived mostly among the older emigrants. They were friendly and opened up to me, interested because for them I represented the younger generation of Germans. In turn I was fascinated by them, because they really did represent Weimar Germany. I sometimes felt that I was reliving the Weimar years, right there in the Leo Baeck Institute, starting with the way they used the language, and extending to the historical perspectives and evaluations."

"Ich lebte am LBI jetzt vorwiegend unter älteren Emigranten. Die öffneten sich mir freundlich und waren sehr interessiert, weil sie mich als Vertreterin der jüngeren deutschen Generation betrachteten. Ich wiederum fand sie faszinierend, weil sie für mich absolute Vertreter der Weimarer Republik waren. Ich hatte manchmal das Gefühl, ich lebte in Weimar dort im Leo Baeck Institut. Das begann bei der Sprache und ging bis zu historischen Perspektiven und Auffassungen."

Monika Richarz (from Beate Meyer's lengthy interview with Richarz, dated 22 August 2003)

This was followed by relocation to New York City, where Richarz worked as a research fellow at the Leo Baeck Institute between 1972 and 1979. She quickly found she had integrated herself into three contrasting worlds: she lived in the city's Lower East Side, "more or less a Puerto Rican slum" (Richarz) with empty houses, collapsed buildings, high crime and a developing fashion in the neighbourhood for Voodoo cult practices; she was also soon participating in a long string of animated discussions with members of the New York feminist movement, and each day she commuted to the Upper East Side for her work at Leo Baeck Institute, then located at East 73rd Street in Manhattan. One major result of her eight years in New York was a volume entitled "Jewish life in Germany: memoirs from three centuries" / "Jüdisches Leben in Deutschland: Selbstzeugnisse zur Sozialgeschichte" which, reflecting the trends in social history at the time, comprised a large collection of autobiographical memoirs. (The institute holds additional memoirs that she collected which never made it into print.) Collecting the many testimonies sometimes involved unconventional research methods, as she sought out written records inherited by their writers' heirs. She cultivated excellent relations with the book keeper of a firm of undertakers that numbered, among its clients, the families of a large number of German Jewish emigrants. Each of the three volumes in which the work eventually appeared included a lengthy introduction by Richarz, setting out her methods with clarity and providing readable insightful summaries which covered each of the three epochs of German Jewish history into which the volumes were arranged. The collection also highlights the extent to which many of the people whose writings it features lived in rural Germany which, as Richarz was quick to point out, comprehensively refuted the stereotyping of German Jews as inhabitants only of the large cities. That theme was one to which she returned after moving back to Germany. In 1993, working jointly with Reinhard Rürup, and again under the auspices of the Leo Baeck Institute, she produced a compilation entitled "Jewish life in the countryside: studies on German Jewish history" ("Jüdisches Leben auf dem Lande: Studien zur deutsch-jüdischen Geschichte").

In 1983 Richarz took over as director of the Germania Judaica in Cologne, a library concerned with the history of German Jews. She arrived at a difficult time, shortly after Prof. Hermann Greive had been shot dead by a firearms-obsessed former student called Sabine Gehlhaar, while delivering a seminar in the library. This had a traumatising impact on the institution. Richarz nevertheless acquired a new zest for teaching, taking on roles as a guest lecturer at the Academy for Jewish Studies in Heidelberg and at Zürich university. She retained her post at the Germania Judaica till 1993.

On 1 December 1993 she took up an appointment as director of the "Institute for the History of German Jews" ("Institut für die Geschichte der deutschen Juden"), in Hamburg, and was able, with the support of younger colleagues, notably Stefan Rohrbacher, Andreas Brämer, Ina Lorenz and Beate Meyer, both to improve its hitherto precarious finances and to raise significantly the level of activity. Richarz used her formidable network of contacts to raise the institute's profile internationally. She herself also continued with her teaching activities and, on 27 November 1996 accepted a professorship from the university.

Monika Richarz retired from her directorship of the institute formally in 2001, to be succeeded by Stefanie Schüler-Springorum.
