= Boehne =

Boehne is a surname. Notable people with the surname include:

- John W. Boehne (1856–1946), American politician
- John W. Boehne Jr. (1895–1973), American politician, son of John W. Boehne
- Rich Boehne (born 1958), American media executive

== See also ==
- Bohne
