= Springorum =

Springorum is a rare surname of German origin, first documented in the late Middle Ages in Bochum and the wider Westphalia region. From the 17th and 18th centuries onward, individuals bearing the name appear in records outside Germany, notably in Amsterdam, reflecting migration from German territories. The name remains uncommon and historically concentrated in western Germany.

Notable people with the surname include:

- Friedrich Springorum (1858–1938), German engineer and entrepreneur
- Fritz Springorum (1886–1942), German engineer, industrialist and politician; son of Friedrich
- Horst Schüler-Springorum (1928–2015), German professor of jurisprudence
- Stefanie Schüler-Springorum (born 1962), German historian, daughter of Horst
