= Friedrich Karrenberg =

German Evangelical-reformed social ethicist and professor

Friedrich Karrenberg (16 April 1904 – 28 November 1966) was a German Evangelical-reformed social ethicist and professor. He was a leading member of the Evangelical Church in the Rhineland.

== Life ==
Karrenberg was born in Velbert, a manufacturing town a short distance to the east of Düsseldorf. He came from an entrepreneurial family. Hugo Karrenberg, his father, owned a factory making barrels and rivets, in which Friedrich served an apprenticeship. He would take over the business when his father died in 1940. Early on he also involved himself in youth movement activities, one effect of which was to awaken an interest in socio-ethical questions. He was particularly influenced by the theology of Karl Barth. In the summer of 1925 Karrenberg enrolled at Frankfurt University where he studied practical economics ("Volkswirtschaft") and sociology. He emerged with a doctorate in political sciences in 1931 and returned home to Velbert and worked in his father's business.

During the next few years, his focus was on the family business, which he continued to run till his death in 1966. Meanwhile, during the Nazi years he served on the informal "fraternal council" of the Confessional Church. He embarked on a parallel academic career relatively late in life. In 1954 he produced the Evangelical Social Lexicon ("Evangelisches Soziallexikon") which grew to become a standard reference work, its ninth edition appearing in 2016. For Karrenberg recognition followed more swiftly, and in 1955 the Theology Faculty at Bonn University awarded him an honorary doctorate for it. In 1961 this was complemented with an honorary doctorate from Cologne University, which came with a newly established teaching chair in Social Ethics. Through his numerous publications and scholarly exchanges with contemporary social scientists he achieved recognition in the field. He was able to examine the interface between social problems and religious-ethical questions in the real-world context of his daily experience managing a mid-sized manufacturing business.

Karrenberg was also involved in church politics. He was a member of the regional synod and part of the leadership of the Evangelical Church in the Rhineland. From 1946 he served as chair of the Social Ethical committee of his church (which in May 1966 became its Social Sciences Institute). After intensive discussion, on 23 October 1946 he presented the "Wort zum Dienst der Kirche am Volk", making clear the belief that "supporting love" for those afflicted by need was not enough. It was necessary to take on a "guardianship role" ("Wächteramt") regarding *the destitution and confusion in the national life" ("der Not und Verwirrung des ganzen Volkslebens"). Between 1950 and 1961 he chaired the Society and Economy Working Group of the German Evangelical Church Assembly. He also chaired the "Social Order chamber" ("Kammer für soziale Ordnung") Evangelical Church (EKD) and in May 1966 became the first head of the newly launched EKD Social Sciences Institute.

Karrenberg's engagement in evangelical church matters was also reflected in the area of public relations. From 1949 till 1959 he served as a member of the original production team for "Community Voice" ("Stimme der Gemeinde"), a twice-monthly magazine produced for the post-war Fraternal Council of the Confessional Church. He was also a co-producer of the "Journal of Evangelical Ethics" ("Zeitschrift für evangelische Ethik").

Friedrich Karrenberg died in a Berlin hospital on 28 November 1966, following a heart attack.

== Publications ==
- Christentum, Kapitalismus und Sozialismus. Darstellung und Kritik der Soziallehre des Protestantismus und Katholizismus in Deutschland seit der Mitte des 19. Jahrhunderts. Berlin : Junker + Dünnhaupt, 1932 (Dissertation).
- Gestalt und Kritik des Westens, Beiträge zur christlichen Sozialethik heute. Stuttgart : Kreuz-Verl., 1959
- (together with Joachim Beckmann) Verantwortung für den Menschen : Beiträge zur gesellschaftlichen Problematik der Gegenwart. Stuttgart: Kreuz Verlag 1957.
- (together with Wolfgang Schweitzer) Spannungsfelder der evangelischen Soziallehre: Aufgaben und Fragen vom Dienst der Kirche an der heutigen Gesellschaft. Hamburg : Furche, 1960.
- (together with Klaus von Bismarck) Kontinente wachsen zusammen. Gesellschaftliche Auswirkungen der Industrialisierung in Europa, Asien und Afrika. Stuttgart: Kreuz-Verl. 1961
- (together with Wilfried Gottschalch and Franz Josef Stegmann) Geschichte der sozialen Ideen in Deutschland. produced by Helga Grebing. München : Olzog, 1969

As compiler-editor
Evangelisches Soziallexikon, 1954 ff.
