= Anne-Eva Brauneck =

German law professor

Anne-Eva Brauneck (born 9 December 1910 in Hamburg; died 6 March 2007 in Lich) became the first or second female (West) German professor of law in 1965. Brauneck studied law at the end of the Weimar Republic at the University of Heidelberg. She turned to studies on the family backgrounds of juvenile offenders. Her work was suspect to the National Socialists because it did not conform to the government mantras involving the "hereditary nature" of criminal proclivity.

== Life ==
=== Provenance and early years ===
Anne-Eva Brauneck was born in Hamburg, the second of her parents' two daughters. The girls' father, who was very much older than their mother, was a secondary school head.

She studied Jurisprudence at Heidelberg during the Great Depression in a period of socio-economic nemesis, political polarisation and parliamentary deadlock which led to the ending of democracy in Germany during 1933. At Heidelberg she was one of the last pupils of the criminal lawyer, legal philosopher and former Minister of Justice, Gustav Radbruch, before his government mandated dismissal from his post. A student contemporary who was also taught by Radbruch, and who subsequently became a life-long friend (and professional ally in the overwhelmingly male world of the West German criminal law) was Helga Einsele.

=== Hitler years ===
It was in 1933 that Brauneck passed her Level-1 national law exams: she passed the Level-2 (final) exams in 1937. During this period she was simultaneously working on her doctorate which would normally have been seen as a milestone on the path to a career in the universities sector. In 1936 she received her doctorate under the supervision of Rudolf Sieverts at Heidelberg. Her dissertation concerned "Pestalozzi's position on the problems of criminal law". Although she became, on paper, a fully qualified lawyer in 1937, women were still denied admission to the legal profession and higher judiciary during the period: there are indications that women's career options in the sector had actually been reduced under the Hitler government. Brauneck took, instead, a mid-level post with the police service, passing a further exam qualifying her as a "Kriminalassistent" in 1939, and allowing her a modest promotion to a higher-level grade.

In the women's criminal police department she was able to enjoy a certain Narrenfreiheit (Note: "Narrenfreiheit" refers to the freedom of late-medieval court jesters to mock their powerful masters and mistresses without being executed for sharing their insights. Although the idea is present in much Elizabethan literature, in the twentieth and twenty-first centuries the concept seems to feature more regularly as a metaphor in German language literature than in Anglo-American sources.) During the twelve Hitler years the authorities became progressively less tolerant of divergent opinions among public officials, and Brauneck turned down at least one promotion opportunity in order to retain the "special protection [she was able to enjoy] in the female service". She also found time to pursue her research interests, with a focus on young offenders and their family backgrounds. Her research findings did not necessary align with National Socialist theories on race and inheritance, however, and seem to have received little attention till after 1945.

While working in the Berlin criminal section of the police service, having been assigned to the Berlin department in 1939, Brauneck drafted a decree on "police treatment of children and young people". This amounted to a set of rules, which to her astonishment Reichsführer Himmler, whose wide accumulation of responsibilities included the police service, signed off without requiring any amendments. The decree, published by the Interior Ministry in July 1944, was later commended by no less a figure than her old doctoral supervisor, Gustav Radbruch, who thought it "humane". In 1942 she had been transferred to an all-women department that was mandated to focus on youth crime. Many of her colleagues had backgrounds in social work. Brauneck herself attributed the respect and relative professional freedom that she felt she enjoyed in the police service by this time to nothing more remarkable than her gender: "All the male criminal officials belonged to the SS: we could not do that, because as women we lacked certain essential characteristics, and so we did indeed have to greet every uniformed colleague we came across appropriately, but we were then left to follow old-fashioned human behavioural principles undisturbed [unlike our male colleagues]. Our superiors ... who secretly were no longer true believers in National Socialism, seemed often to find it entirely correct that, as women, we had certain 'innate weaknesses'".

=== Post-war years ===
After the Soviets captured Berlin in the early summer of 1945 members of the police department all found themselves dismissed without notice. She subsequently discovered that any accrued employment rights from her eight year of police service that she might have anticipated would in any case have been without effect, since under the Hitler government women police staff - unlike their male counterparts - only received "lifetime" contracts and the accompanying entitlements after reaching the age of 35. She was 34 when the war ended. She did not, in any event, re-apply for a job with the police service, since the only criminal investigation jobs open to women, even at this stage, were relatively low down in the organisational hierarchy, and poorly paid. Instead she worked "as a freelancer", at the same time devoting herself to studying aspects of Psychology. She supported herself initially with "gardening and cleaning work". Later she found tutoring jobs, also earning money with journalistic contributions.

With the western two thirds of Germany administratively divided and under military occupation, the future looked anything but certain. As the universities emerged from the rubble of military defeat, she evidently decided that for the next stage of her career she should try and return to the universities sector, and began to attend lectures in Psychology and Philosophy (broadly defined) at Berlin University and later also at Hamburg University in the British zone. She also participated in seminars and produced a substantial piece of academic work which she later described as "at the frontier" between her two chosen areas of study.

=== UNESCO report ===
Between 1950 and 1952/53 Brauneck was one in a three member team conducting an in-depth study on the relationship of young people in Germany with authority. The other team members were the youth psychologist Rudolf Abshagen and a Finnish sociologist called Knut Pipping. The report was commissioned by the UNESCO and the 3-person team operated under the theoretical supervision of an international board of trustees. On its completion it was published in 1954 (in German) Denmark by the Finnish Academy of Science and Letters. It earned one of the team members a "Habilitation" - a higher-level academic qualification normally awarded by a university), and it also appears usefully to have raised Brauneck's own profile in the German academic world. Looking back on her involvement Brauneck would recall the experience as "very interesting and instructive". She would recall later that she had written most of the report herself, and that the "Habilitation" had gone instead to Pipping, not because he was a man, but simply because he was the designated leader of the three person team.

=== Research assistant+ in Hamburg ===
Brauneck would look back on her five years working at Hamburg for Rudolf Sieverts with mixed emotions:

- "I fully accept that in this position [as both Youth Justice research assistant and DVJJ 'honorary head of business'] I experienced and saw a lot of professionally interesting things, but I did not like always having to be the one who made the coffee for departmental meetings, always having to take the minutes, look after travel money, and undertake all sorts of other [basic administrative] functions".
- "Ich leugne nicht, in dieser Rolle viel sachlich Interessantes erfahren und gesehen zu haben, mochte aber nicht, daß auf Arbeitstagungen neben Protokollführung, Reisegeldauszahlen und allerlei sonstigen Diensten auch das Kaffeekochen von mir erwartet wurde."

Anne-Eva Brauneck in conversion with Margarete Fahricius-Brand and others, 1982

The British military authorities released Brauneck's old tutor Rudolf Sieverts from the Neuengamme Internment Camp only in 1946. He was one of a number of people detained in the camp on account of suspicions that he could have been involved in Nazi crimes in the Hamburg area. As far as is known, nothing came of those suspicions, but it evidently took him some time to get his university career, but at some point during or before 1954 he accepted the teaching chair in Criminology at the University of Hamburg. Both Sieverts and Brauneck held firm views on the causes of youth crime, and in many respects those views - which at the time would still have been popularly characterised in North America and the Soviet Union as "progressive" - overlapped. In 1952 she accepted a position at Hamburg as research assistant at the Hamburg University seminar for Youth Justice. Sieverts led the department: colleagues included the jurists Herbert Jäger, Claus Roxin and Horst Schüler-Springorum. The research assistant role was an important step in Brauneck's career progression. She was less enthusiastic about the additional role she was obliged to accept as "ehrenamtliche Geschäftsführerin" (loosely in this context, "honorary head of business") for the German Association for Youth Courts and Youth Justice Support ("Deutsche Vereinigung für Jugendgerichte und Jugendgerichtshilfen" / DVJJ). Rudolf Sieverts had headed up the DVJJ from Hamburg since its 1953 reinstatement.

=== Habilitation ===
The conventional path to a life-long career in university-level education in West Germany was through a "Habilitation" (post-doctoral) degree, and during her five years working as an assistant for Sieverts awareness of this gap in her qualifications became increasingly pressing. She faced resistance to the idea both (she became convinced) on account of her gender and because Criminology, her speciality, had not yet been rehabilitated as an independent subject in its own right among the Hamburg academic community. It had been effectively downgraded in Germany during the 1940s, atrophied both by the simplistic inflexibility of National Socialist pseudo-science and by the enforced emigration, during the 1930s, of many of Germany's leading criminologists, most of whom seem to have ended up in the United States of America. By the later 1950s - partly as a result of the efforts of Rudolf Sieverts and his team - Criminology had regained a measure of academic respectability. Anne-Eva Brauneck completed her Habilitation dissertation in 1959 and finally received her Habilitation degree in 1961. It dealt with "Criminal Law and Criminal Law Support" ("Strafrecht und strafrechtliche Hilfswissenschaften") and was based on a catamnesistic investigation of around 300 convicted young offenders, and she had secured from Sieverts - who was by this time a senior member of the university - an assurance that in return for this work she should expect to receive a "venia legendi" ("permission to teach at the university").

=== Professor in Gießen ===
After securing her habilitation there is a sense in which Anne-Eva Brauneck had outgrown her various roles at Hamburg, and though her gender may still have counted against her, in 1965 she was able to accept the newly created teaching chair in "Criminal Law and Criminology" ("Strafrecht und Kriminologie" - subsequently re-focused as the teaching chair in "Criminology and Criminal Policy" - "Kriminologie und Kriminalpolitik") at the University of Giessen. This made her the first female to become a full professor in a German university law faculty according to at least one source, and it is perfectly correct to identify her as the first female to become a full law professor in a West German university law faculty. That is indeed how Brauneck herself described the position. However, the situation is complicated by the fact that the German Federal Republic (West Germany) and the German Democratic Republic (East Germany) were only launched as semi-autonomous states in 1949. Between 1945 and 1949 the western two thirds of what had previously been Germany were divided up into four occupation zones and administered by the military authorities of the Soviet Union, the United States, Britain and France. If those post-war occupation zones are thought of as "Germany", then first female to become a full professor in a German university law faculty was Gertrud Schubart-Fikentscher (1896-1985), appointed in September 1948 to a teaching chair in civil law and legal history at the University of Halle, then in the Soviet occupation zone (relaunched in October 1949 as the Soviet-sponsored German Democratic Republic). By applying this alternative assumption, or even simply by remembering that East Germany was a part of what became Germany in 1990 just as surely as West Germany was (since Gertrud Schubart-Fikentscher retired only in 1957), Anne-Eva Brauneck becomes not the first but the second female German professor of law to be appointed.

== Celebration ==
Anne-Eva Brauneck retired in 1975. Her successor at Gießen, Arthur Kreuzer, produced an affectionate tribute to her when she died aged 96 at her home in Lich (just outside Gießen), more than thirty years later. He was fulsome in his praise of her contribution to various professional (and other) associations, including the Deutscher Juristinnenbund (German Association of [female] jurists), the Deutsche Vereinigung für Jugendgerichte und Jugendgerichtshilfen (German Association for Youth Courts and Youth Justice Support), the 16-member "Alternative Professors" working group on comprehensive Criminal Law Reform and the Humanist Union. Kreuzer also commended, in particular, Brauneck's contributions over the years to the Monatsschrift für Kriminologie und Strafrechtsreform, a specialist journal devoted to criminology and criminal law reform.

== Published output (selection) ==
- Pestalozzis Stellung zu den Strafrechtsproblemen. (Doctoral dissertation, Hamburg 1936)
- with Knut Pipping and Rudolf Abshagen: Gespräche mit der deutschen Jugend. Ein Beitrag zum Autoritätsproblem, Helsingfors 1954
- Die Entwicklung jugendlicher Straftäter. (Habilitation text, Hamburg 1961)
- Allgemeine Kriminologie. (1970)
- Fühlen und Denken. (1997)
