= Hans Joachim Schneider =

German jurist, criminologist and psychologist

Hans Joachim Schneider (14 November 1928 - 18 June 2015) was a German jurist, criminologist and psychologist. He taught as Professor of Criminology at the University of Münster.

== Life ==
Hans Joachim Schneider was born in Biedenkopf, a small market town in the hills between Cologne and Kassel. From 1940 till 1949 he attended the Christian Rauch School at nearby Arolsen.

Between 1949 and 1955 he studied Jurisprudence at Marburg, Frankfurt and Cologne. He passed his national law exams in 1955 (Part I) at the Cologne district High court and 1961 (Part II) at Düsseldorf. During this period he received his doctorate in 1957 from Cologne University. For his dissertation he was supervised by Gotthold Bohne. Instead of pursuing a career based on his law qualifications, in 1961 he embarked on the study of Psychology, Sociology and Pedagogy at Basel and Freiburg, emerging in 1967 with a degree in Psychology from Freiburg University. Between 1967 and 1971 he worked with Rudolf Sieverts at the Faculty of Jurisprudence at Hamburg University, where he received his Habilitation (higher academic qualification) in 1971 for work on Criminology, Youth justice and Punishment strategy.

It was also in 1971 that Schneider transferred to the University of Münster where he was appointed Professor for Criminology, Legal psychology and Criminal law. He himself would later describe the post in English, slightly more succinctly, as a professorship in criminology and victimology. He remained at the university until his retirement in 1994, working as a researcher and a teacher, also travelling widely and employed as a visiting professor at various universities abroad. Between 1979 and 1985 he served as the founding president of the World Society of Victimology, the focus of his work being on causes and prevention of crime. After 1994 he continued to be based in Münster and retained close links with the university. He also taught, post retirement, as a guest professor at the University of Łódź, which had awarded him an honorary doctorate in 1987.

== Personal ==
Hans Joachim Schneider and his wife, Hildegard, had two recorded children:

- Dr. jur. Dipl.-Psych. Ursula Schneider (born 1956) who became a judge of the German Federal Court in Karlsruhe.
- Dr.-Ing. MBA Marvin Oliver Schneider (born 1973) who became a professor at a Business School in São Paulo.
