= Emil Schorsch =

Emil Schorsch (January 12, 1899, in Hüngheim, Germany – 1982 in Vineland (New Jersey)) was a German rabbi.

== Life ==
Emil was the son of businessman Isaak Schorsch. In 1907 he was placed in an orphanage, and from 1915 to 1920 he trained to be a teacher, with an interruption for war service.

Schorsch began to study philosophy, psychology, and oriental languages in 1922 at the Universities of Breslau and Tübingen. He simultaneously studied at the Jewish Theological Seminary of Breslau. In 1925, he completed his dissertation "Die Lehrbarkeit der Religion" (The Teachability of Religion).

In 1927 Schorsch was called to Hannover to be the second rabbi in the community, along with Samuel Freund. His tasks included working with Jewish youth, and he helped start Jewish school for secondary school students, the Lehrhaus.

Emil Schorsch was married to Fanny Rothschild, a daughter of Theodore Rothschild. Their children were Hanna Schorsch and Ismar Schorsch, who became a rabbi and was the president of the Leo Baeck Institute (LBI) New York and Chancellor of the Jewish Theological Seminary of America.

During the Kristallnacht in 1938, Emil was arrested and interned at the Buchenwald concentration camp. After his release, he and his family fled first to England, and in 1940 to the US. He was a rabbi in Pottstown, Pennsylvania, from 1940 to 1964.

== Works ==
- Die Lehrbarkeit der Religion (1925, Dissertation)

== Literature ==
- Ismar Schorsch: Rabbi Emil Schorsch za"l, 1982
- Guido Kisch: Das Breslauer Seminar. Jüdisch-Theologisches Seminar (Fraenkelsche Stiftung) in Breslau 1854–1939; Gedächtnisschrift, Tübingen 1963; p. 433
- Biographisches Handbuch der deutschsprachigen Emigration nach 1933, hg. von W. Röder und H. Strauss. München, 1980; p. 666
- Monika Richarz (Editor): Jüdisches Leben in Deutschland; Bd. 3: Selbstzeugnisse zur Sozialgeschichte 1918–1945; 1982; p. 183–188
