= Bohne =

Bohne is a North German variant of the German language occupational surname Bohn for a grower of beans. Notable people with the name include:

- Gotthold Bohne (1890–1957), German law professor
- Hermann Bohne (1890–1949), Norwegian gymnast
- Louis Bohne (died 1821), sales agent for Veuve Clicquot
- Nikki Bohne (1987), American singer, stage actress, and dancer
- Sam Bohne (1896–1977), professional Major League Baseball player
- Walter Bohne (1903–1944), German communist
- Werner Bohne (1895–1940), German cinematographer
