= Rudolf Sieverts =

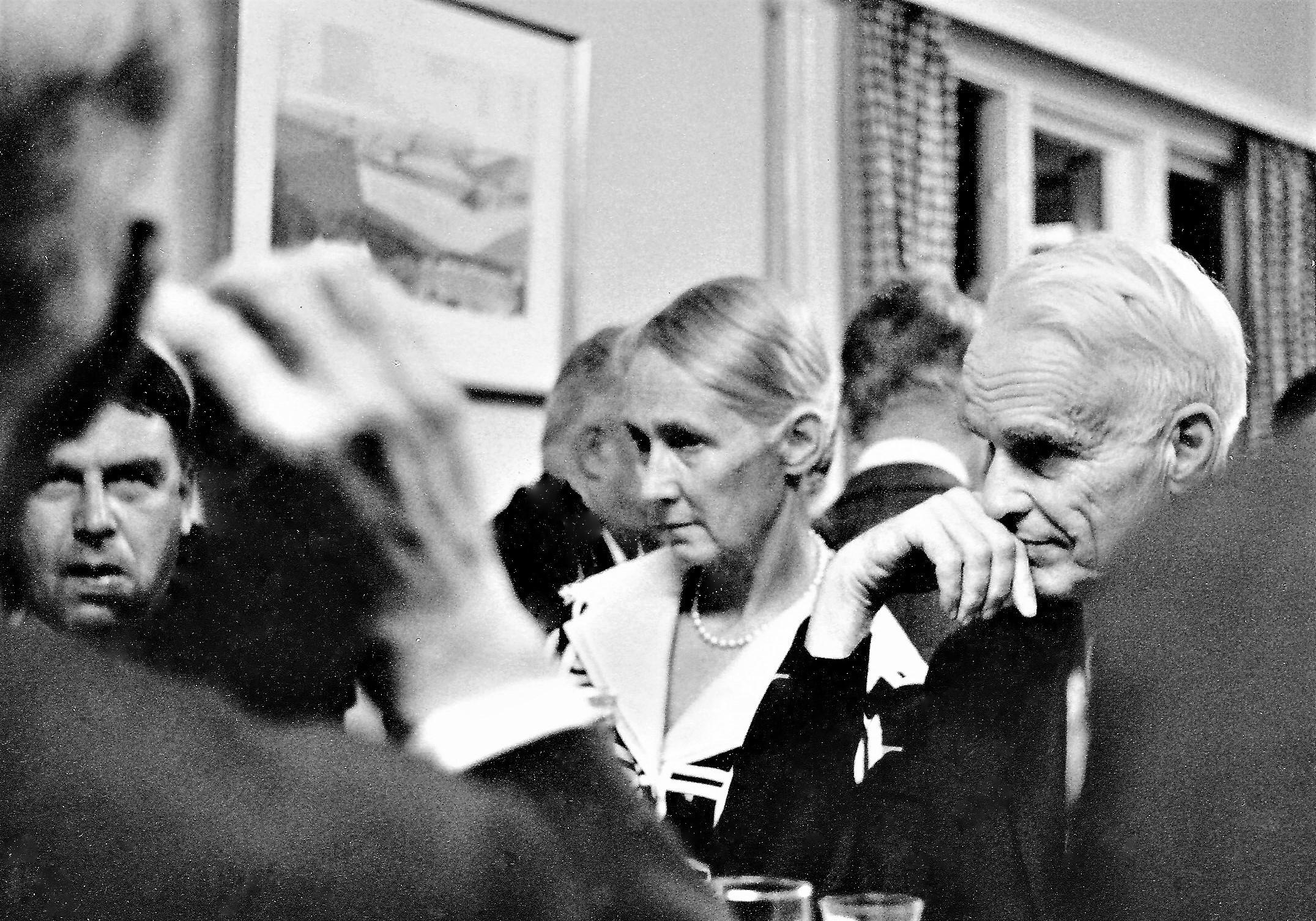
Rudolf Sieverts at the founding ceremony of the Danish-German Academy (January 1968).

Rudolf Sieverts (3 November 1903 – 28 April 1980) was a German Law professor and Criminologist.

== Life ==
Rudolf Sieverts was born in Meißen, a short distance down river from Dresden. His father, Adolf Ferdinand Sieverts, was a Chemistry professor.

He studied Jurisprudence at Greifswald, Frankfurt am Main and Hamburg, acquiring his Doctor of Law along the way. It was at Hamburg that he studied successfully for his habilitation (higher academic qualification) while working as a research assistant for Moritz Liepmann. The work was supervised by Ernst Delaquis. Sieverts received his habilitation in 1932, and two years later Ernst Delaquis was forced to resign from his academic posts at Hamburg. Delaquis was Jewish. Delaquis went on to pursue his career, successfully, in Switzerland. In Hamburg, Sieverts took over the professorship, holding between 1934 and his own retirement in 1971 the teaching chair for criminal law, criminology, youth law, forensic law and comparative law. Some of his more notable students over the years included Harro Otto and Hans-Dieter Schwind (whose doctorates he supervised), Horst Schüler-Springorum, Herbert Jäger and Hans Joachim Schneider (whose habilitations he supervised) and Anne-Eva Brauneck.

During the middle 1930s he also worked for the German Academic Exchange Service ("Deutscher Akademischer Austauschdienst" / DAAD), taking a leadership position with the DAAD London branch office in 1935/36. Visiting England, he took a particular interest in the education provision for youth offenders and in the borstal system, an area in which at that time the British system was seen as a standard setter. He had already concluded, while still a student, that most criminals had already embarked on their criminal careers while still children or teenagers.

Since taking power at the start of 1933 the Nazi government had rapidly transformed Germany into a one-party state. In 1937 Sieverts applied for Nazi Party membership: his application was accepted in March 1940. He served on the senate (governing council) of the Nazis' Tropical Medicines Academy ("Kolonialärztliche Akademie der NSDAP"). In October 1944 he also accepted a position involving the Hitler Youth. Sources are imprecise on the details and extent of Sieverts' involvement with the Nazi regime, but he was briefly interned after the war at the Neuengamme internment camp established in the British occupation zone to hold people suspected of involvement in Nazi crimes in the Hamburg area: he was released only in 1946.

Later on, Sieverts was a member of the expert committee on youth justice which had a decisive influence over the 1953 reform of the Juvenile Courts Act. In October 1953 he was appointed senior chair of the Youth Court in Munich. He was temporarily president of the regional High Court in Hamburg, and in 1960 he chaired the Working Group on Criminal Law reform. He spoke out in 1964 against a general amnesty for political crimes of the Third Reich era. In 1967 he was appointed to chair the West German Justice Ministry's Federal Justice commission.

Between 1961 and 1963 Sieverts served as Rector at the University of Hamburg. Between 1964 and 1967 he was president of the West German University Rectors' Conference. In 1964 he was a co-founder in Hamburg of the first West German Amnesty International group.
