= Ismar Schorsch =

German–American Jewish theological academic

Ismar Schorsch (born 3 November 1935) is the chancellor emeritus of the Jewish Theological Seminary (JTS) and the Rabbi Herman Abramovitz Professor of Jewish history.

Schorsch was born in Hanover, Germany. He served as the sixth Chancellor at JTS for approximately 20 years, from March 1986 until his retirement in June 2006. He was succeeded by Arnold Eisen.

== Books ==
- Jewish Reactions to German Anti-Semitism, 1870–1914. New York: Columbia University Press, 1972.
- From Text to Context: The Turn to History in Modern Judaism. Hanover, N.H.: University Press of New England, 1994.
- The Sacred Cluster: The Core Values of Conservative Judaism. New York: The Department of Communications of the Jewish Theological Seminary of America, 1995. (Outlining what he calls the seven clusters of Conservative Judaism.)
- Canon Without Closure: Torah Commentaries. New York: Aviv Press, 2007.
- Leopold Zunz: Creativity in Adversity. Philadelphia: University of Pennsylvania Press, 2016. ISBN 9780812248531

== Personal life and education ==
He is the son of Rabbi Emil Schorsch. Rabbi Emil Schorsch was arrested and interned in Buchenwald on Kristallnacht. The Schorsch family escaped to England in 1938 and emigrated to the United States in 1940.

Schorsch graduated from Ursinus College in 1957 and was ordained by JTS in 1962, holds master's degrees from JTS and Columbia University. He was awarded a PhD in Jewish History from Columbia University in 1969. He and his wife, Sally, have three grown children (Jonathan Schorsch, Rebecca Schorsch, and Naomi Stein) and eleven grandchildren (Ada, Livi, and Nathaniel Moses, Emanuel, Michal, Gedalia, Nava, and Jacob Schorsch, and Eve, Emmett, and Ruthie Stein).

== Honors ==
- Leo Baeck Medal (2015)
