= Franz Leschnitzer =

German journalist-commentator and peace activist

- Born: 12 February 1905; Posen (Poznań since 1945), Prussia, Germany
- Died: 16 May 1967 (aged 62); East Berlin, German Democratic Republic (East Germany)
- Education: Berlin
- Occupations: Political journalist-commentator Peace activist University-level teacher
- Political party: KPD; SED
- Spouse(s): 1. Hildegard Samson (1904–1974); 2. Josephine Boss-Stapenhorst
- Parents: Oscar Leschnitzer (1864–1934) (father); Natalie Fuchs (mother)

Franz Leschnitzer (12 February 1905 – 16 May 1967) was a German journalist-commentator, author and peace activist. In view of his Jewish provenance and communist politics, he was obliged to escape the country during 1933, and while living in Moscow was formally deprived, in absentia, of his German citizenship in 1939. He lived in the Soviet Union between 1933 and 1959, supporting himself as a political journalist and through teaching work in Moscow and Tashkent.

== Life ==
=== Provenance and early years ===
Franz Leschnitzer was born into a family of Jewish intellectuals in Posen, which at the time of his birth (and indeed till 1920) was part of Germany. Oscar Leschnitzer (1864–1934), his father, was a pharmacist who relocated with his family to Berlin in 1910. Franz had an elder brother, Adolf Leschnitzer, who would emigrate to New York City where for twenty years he was employed as a professor at the "City College". Franz Leschnitzer attended junior school locally, moving on later to the prestigious "Kaiserin Augusta Gymnasium", a "Humanist Gymnasium" (post-traditionalist secondary school) in Berlin-Charlottenburg.

On completing his schooling in 1924 he embarked on an apprenticeship with a Berlin-based oil company, but soon abandoned this. Between October 1924 and 1930 he attended the "Friedrich Wilhelm University" (as Berlin's principal university was known between 1810 and 1945), where his studies embraced Jurisprudence and "Nationalökonomie" (loosely, "Applied Economics"), with subsidiary credits in Germanistics and Philosophy.

=== Antimilitarism ===
While still at school, in 1922, Franz Leschnitzer became a member of the German Peace Society. In 1926 he joined the "Revolutionary Pacifists' Group", newly founded that year by Kurt Hiller. Since even before 1914 there had been a conspicuous overlap in Germany between anti-militarism and what became communism. It was in that context that in 1927 Leschnitzer joined the "Red Students' Group". He was an early member of the "League of Proletarian-Revolutionary writers" in 1928. Franz Leschnitzer joined the Communist Party itself in October 1931.

The extent to which Leschnitzer combined his Berlin student career with work as a political journalist is remarkable, even by the standards of those times. The most high-profile of the publications to which he contributed, probably, was "Die Weltbühne", which between 1925 and 1928 published 39 substantial pieces by him. During and after 1925 he also became a regular contributor to the satirical weekly "Der Drache" and to other radical and pacifist political journals including "Die Neue Generation" and "Die Friedenswarte".

Details of his university degree are unclear, but in 1930 Leschnitzer was officially blocked from sitting his national Level 1 Law Exams "on political grounds". This would have put an end to any career plans that he might have entertained to qualify as a lawyer or judicial official. At the end of 1930 he joined "Internationale Arbeiter-Hilfe" (IAH), a Berlin-based "international workers' welfare organisation", widely (and correctly) believed to have close links to the Soviet leadership. Between February and October 1931 he was employed as editor-secretary with "Der Rote Aufbau", the newspaper of the IAH. At the end of the year he took a trip through the Soviet Union as part of an IAH delegation, returning home early in 1932.

During 1932/33 Leschnitzer delivered lectures on Jurisprudence, Literature and History at the Marxist Workers' College (MASCH) in Berlin. Meanwhile, the intensifying political polarisation, which had been driven by the widespread austerity and record levels of unemployment that had followed in the Great Depression after the Wall Street crash, was seeping into the structures of government. Parliament was becoming deadlocked as the two extremist parties won increasing levels of support from voters, while refusing to cooperate either with each other or with the moderate parties which still retained a commitment to making democracy work. Leschnitzer expended his political energies between March 1932 and March 1933 to his work as secretary of the "German resistance committee against war and fascism" (Note: "Deutsche Kampfkomitee gegen Krieg und Faschismus") in Berlin. In August 1932 and December 1932 he participated at the anti-war congresses in Amsterdam and Paris.

=== Soviet exile ===
During March 1933, in the immediate aftermath of the Reichstag Fire, people with known communist connections were singled out by the government and its agencies for demonisation. Those with known links to Moscow and those identified as Jewish were at particular risk of persecution from the security services. It is reported that during March 1933 Leschnitzer was the target of three separate official investigations, and that month he escaped to Vienna which, before 1938, remained beyond the direct control of the German government. By May 1933 he had nevertheless moved on again, this time to Brünn (as Brno was known before 1945) and Prague. He remained in Brünn for a few weeks, where he stayed with his fellow political exile, Johannes R. Becher. Between 1933 and 1938 Czechoslovakia rapidly became a place of refuge for a large number of political refugees from Hitler's Germany, with a particular focus on Prague. Franz Leschnitzer was one of the first to contribute to "Der Gegen-Angriff", a newly launched fortnightly newspaper produced by and for German exiles.

Later that month Leschnitzer moved on again. By the end of May 1933 he was in the Soviet Union where he would live for more than a quarter of a century, surviving in peace and war through a succession of sometimes dramatic political and social shifts. He made his home in Moscow where, as a representative since 1928 of the German "League of Proletarian-Revolutionary writers", he already had some contacts. Moscow, like Prague, had a growing population of German refugees, driven from their homes by some combination of politics and race, and a corresponding number of opportunities were appearing for German-language journalism. As early as June 1933 Leschnitzer obtained an editorial position with the German-language pages of "Internationale Literatur", a publication to which he remained an important contributor, under editor in chief Johannes R. Becher (who had arrived in Moscow a few weeks earlier), until 1941. He wrote regularly for the Moscow-based German language Deutsche Zentral-Zeitung. During 1933/34 he also worked as a teacher at the Karl Liebknecht School, which had opened in Moscow in 1924 for the children of German-speaking emigrants and refugees (and would close in 1939 in the context of the Great Purge).

In 1934 Leschnitzer became a member of the newly launched Union of Soviet Writers. Two years later, in 1936, the semi-official comment that a German language "Literary-Historical Reading Book" for school use which he had compiled jointly with Jolan Kelen-Fried was underpinned by "vulgar sociological tendencies" served as a salutary reminder that published work in Moscow could always be subjected to a certain level of ill-defined and unpredictable supervision. During the later 1930s many of the German communists who had found sanctuary from Hitler's German in Moscow a few years earlier were caught up in the purges which were at their height between 1936 and 1938. Leschnitzer avoided being killed during that period, but he nevertheless came under intense if unspecified pressure from government agencies. He later reported having denounced his own wife, Hildegard, to the authorities. In November 1939 news was sent through from Germany that the German government had deprived him of his German citizenship "in absentia". It was in some ways a somewhat theoretical sanction. Nevertheless, for the next eight years, till 1947, he was officially "stateless".

=== War years ===
In September 1939 the invasion of Poland by Germany from the west and by the Soviet Union from the east marked the outbreak of the Second World War. In Moscow there was little effect on Franz Leschnitzer in the immediate term, and he continued to write for "Internationale Literatur". Between July and October 1941 he worked as a literary editor for "Meschdunarodnaja Kniga", a Moscow publishing business.

In June 1941 the German leadership unexpectedly (to some) renounced the non-aggression pact which the German and Soviet governments had concluded in August 1939, less than two years earlier, and launched a full-scale invasion of the Soviet Union. During the rest of 1941 the Soviet government undertook a mass-evacuation, unprecedented in scale. The first priority was the relocation of production. Between July 1941 and November 1941 plant and machinery and anything else movable from 1,523 industrial operations, including "1,360 large plants", was crated up, placed on railway wagons, and transported from Belarus, western Russia, Ukraine and the Soviet Union's other western territories, far to the centre and east of the country. The Soviet government left Moscow only in October 1941, by which time millions of Soviet civilians, some in response to government orders and others on their own initiatives, had also relocated to the east. It was also in October 1941 that Franz Leschnitzer was evacuated ending up, like most of Moscow's many German political refugees, in Tashkent. Between February 1942 and April 1943 Leschnitzer was employed as a teacher at the foreign languages division of the "Military Academy of Armoured Troops" ("Военная Академия Бронетанковых Войск"), a prestigious army college for mechanised and motorised warfare - notably involving the use of tanks - which had also relocated from Moscow to Tashkent.

By the summer of 1942 the German armies attacking Moscow had been beaten back, and the exiled leadership of the German Communist Party were reinstalled in the Soviet capital; but most of the other Germans who had been evacuated to Tashkent remained there. In August 1942 the Central Committee of the Communist Party of Germany expelled Leschnitzer from party membership "on account of insufficient vigilance in respect of anti-Soviet elements". (Note: "...wegen Mangels an Wachsamkeit gegenüber sowjetfeindlichen Elementen".) Leschnitzer's subsequent attempts to secure rehabilitation, while still based in Tashkent, failed.

=== Teaching in Tashkent ===
Still in Tashkent, between April 1943 and July 1948 Leschnitzer was employed as a senior teacher at the city's Pedagogical Evening College. In parallel, between September 1944 and September 1945 he was employed as a senior teacher at the Philology Faculty of the Mid-Asia State University of Tashkent. In October 1945 he joined the teaching staff at the "Pedagogic University" (Teacher Training College), where he continued to teach till he left Tashkent in 1948. In 1947 he became head of German-Language teaching at this institution. Additionally, between 1945 and 1947 he was employed in the local prisoner of war camps, mandated to teach Antifascism to the (mostly) German-speaking inmates.

=== Moscow ===
By 1947 Leschnitzer had evidently redeemed himself in respect of black marks acquired during the purge years. That year he was granted Soviet citizenship, a benefit he retained for twelve years, till 1959. Meanwhile, during the second half of 1948 he returned from Tashkent to Moscow. Between August 1948 and May 1957 he worked in Moscow as a translator for the Moscow German-language version of the young people's newspaper, "Neues Leben" and the monthly literary journal "Sowjetliteratur". He also applied for permission to return to the Soviet occupation zone of Germany, receiving his answer from the Soviet authorities in August 1949. His application was rejected. Between May 1957 and December 1959 he served as a member of the advisory committee for "Neues Leben" with Pravda. "Neues Leben" was a newspaper in the German language written for young people, production of which was transferred from Deutsche Zentral-Zeitung to Pravda in 1957. Its target readership presumably included large numbers of German men who had been captured as conscript soldiers before 1945 and then prevented from returning Germany. Following the death of Stalin in 1953 the numbers of Germans permitted to return to Germany had nevertheless accelerated, and in December 1959 Franz Leschnitzer himself was permitted to return to the German Democratic Republic (East Germany), the former Soviet occupation zone which had been rebranded and relaunched as a new kind of one- party dictatorship in October 1949. Leschnitzer was almost immediately welcomed into the ruling Socialist Unity Party ("Sozialistische Einheitspartei Deutschlands" / SED) which had replaced the Communist Party in East Germany in 1946, while he had been away in Tashkent. He would resign his party membership in October 1963, however.

=== East Berlin ===
Between 1959 and 1967 Leschnitzer lived out his final years in East Berlin, working as a self-employed author and translator. This meant becoming a member of the (East) German Writers' Association, which he did in 1960. He continued to contribute to "Sowjetliteratur", the monthly literary magazine published in Moscow.

In 1964, by this time aged 59, he received a doctorate from the University of Rostock for a study of "Goethe's Faust and Soviet Literature". He died in East Berlin on 16 May 1967.

== Personal ==
Leschnitzer's first wife was born Hildegard Samson (*30. 7. 1904 – † 5. 12. 1974), the daughter of a Jewish photographer. She was employed as a typist at various businesses. At one point she worked for "Die Weltbühne". It is likely but not certain that the couple were still living together in 1933 when they both escaped to Prague, and from there to the Soviet Union. Hildegard worked in Moscow for "Internationale Literatur" and "Das Wort". After that she found typing work with the "Profintern" and the "People's Commissariat for Foreign Trade". In 1941, when Franz Leschnitzer was evacuated to Tashkent, Hildegard was evacuated to Tomsk where she became a member of an agriculture co-operative. She was able to return to what was still administered as the Soviet occupation zone in 1947, and immediately joined the SED. She worked for a succession of publications including the party's principal daily newspaper, Neues Deutschland.

In 1940, having evidently broken with Hildegard, Franz Leschnitzer entered briefly into a fictitious marriage with Josephine Stapenhorst after the arrest of her husband, the physician Adolf Boss (1902–1942). (Later that year Stapenhorst escaped to Scotland via Murmansk.)
