= Wilhelm Schubart =

German historian

- Born: October 21, 1873; Liegnitz, German Empire
- Died: August 9, 1960 (aged 86); Halle, East Germany
- Occupations: Museum curator, college professor
- Employer(s): Royal Museum (Berlin) (1901–1937); University of Leipzig (1948–1952)
- Spouse: Gertrud Schubart-Fikentscher (m. 1928)

Academic background
- Education: University of Tübingen; University of Halle; University of Berlin; University of Breslau (PhD)

Academic work
- Discipline: Ancient history
- Institutions: Humboldt University of Berlin; Leipzig University

Friedrich Wilhelm Ludwig Schubart (21 October 1873 – 9 August 1960) was a German ancient historian. He was a leading authority in the field of papyrology.

Schubart was born on 21 October 1873 in Liegnitz, then part of the German Empire. He studied classical philology and philosophy at the Universities of Tübingen, Halle, Berlin and Breslau, earning his PhD at the latter institution in 1897. In 1900 he obtained his habilitation in ancient history at Berlin, becoming an associate professor in 1912. From 1931 to 1937 he was an honorary professor in Berlin, later serving as a professor of ancient history at the University of Leipzig (1948–1952).

From 1901 to 1912 he worked as an assistant director at the Royal Museum in Berlin. Afterwards, he served as curator and director of the Papyrussammlung (Papyrus collections) in Berlin (1912–1937).

On 17 December 1928, he married Gertrud Schubart-Fikentscher, who later became a professor of law at the University of Halle. Schubart died in Halle on 9 August 1960.

== Selected works ==
- Das Buch bei den Griechen und Römern, 1907 – The book of Greeks and Romans.
- Elephantine-Papyri (with Otto Rubensohn and Wilhelm Spiegelberg), 1907 – Elephantine papyri.
- Papyri graecae berolinenses, 1911 – Greek papyri in Berlin [collections].
- Einführung in die papyruskunde, 1918 – Introduction to papyrus studies.
- Papyri und Ostraka der Ptolemäerzeit, 1922 – Papyri and ostracon of the Ptolemaic Era.
- Palaeographie, 1925 – Palaeography.
- Justinian und Theodora, 1936 – Justinian and Theodora.
