= Samuel Freund =

Samuel Freund (born 24 September 1868 in Gleiwitz; died 28 June 1939 in Hannover) was the senior rabbi of Hannover and the Landrabbiner for the German state of Lower Saxony.

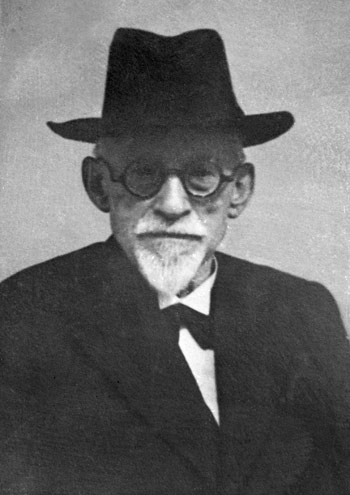
Rabbi Samuel Freund in 1930

== Life ==
The son of businessman Isidor Freund and his wife Caecilia, Samuel Freund studied philosophy at the University of Breslau from 1887 to 1890 while also completing his rabbinical training at Breslau's Jewish Theological Seminary. Freund continued his studies in philosophy at Heidelberg University, where he received his doctorate in 1892. Freund served as rabbi in smaller congregations in Czarnikau, and then Ostrowo, where he met and married Minna Feilchenfeld.

In 1907, Samuel Freund took a position as the junior rabbi of Hannover, where he ran the religious schools. The Romanesque synagogue in the center of Hannover served as the focal point of the city's Jewish community. Designed by Edwin Oppler of the Hanover school of architecture and completed in 1870, the building was the first large, free-standing synagogue in Germany.

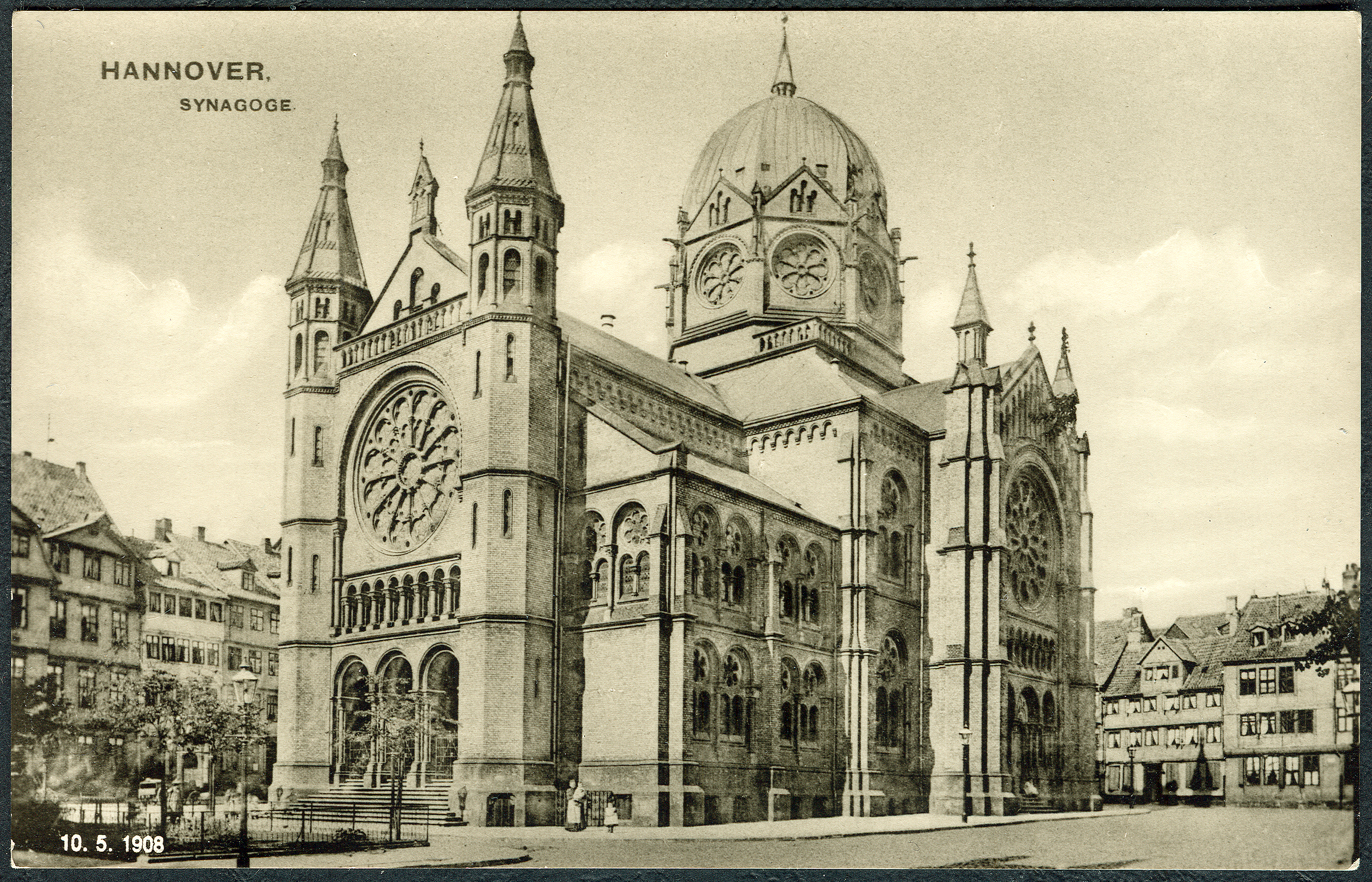
Hannover Synagogue

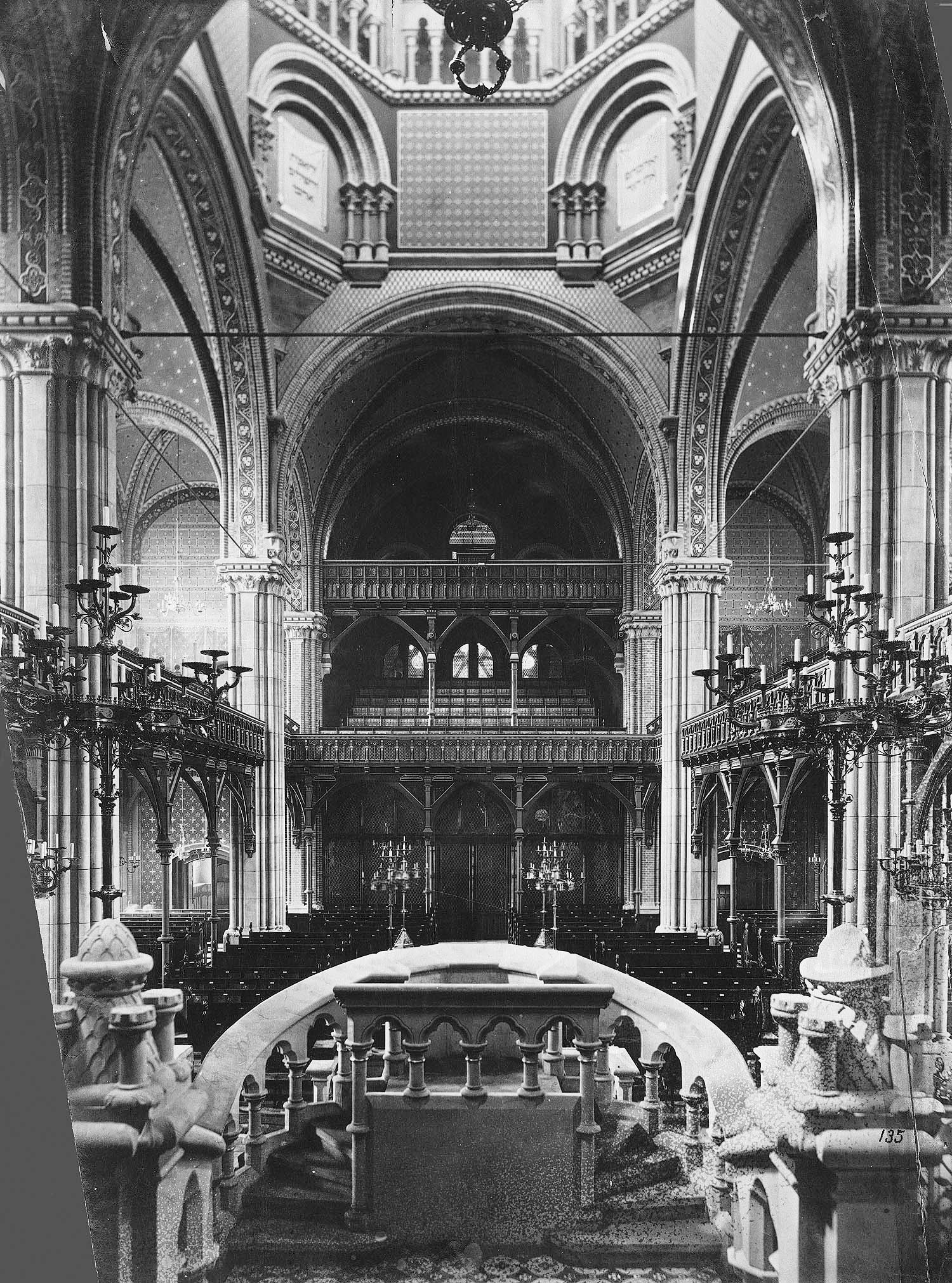
Hannover Synagogue Interior

During World War I, Freund enlisted in the army and served as clergy in German combat units. Returning from the war in 1918, Samuel Freund assumed the position of senior rabbi of Hannover.

== The Eckart Affair ==
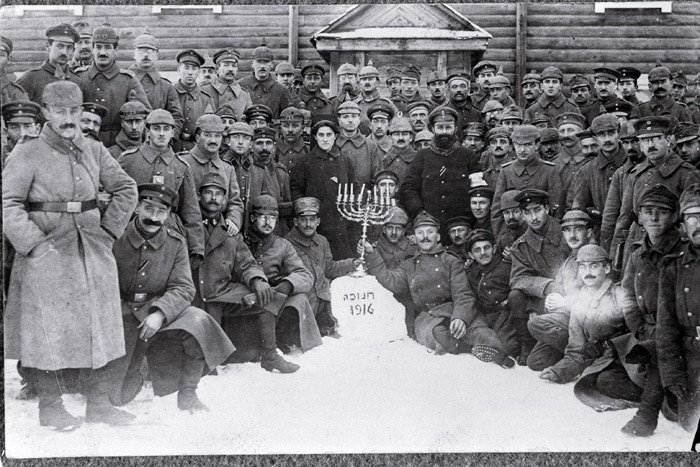
German Jewish soldiers celebrate Hanukkah, 1916

In 1921, Samuel Freund took a leading role in the German Jewish community's response to the anti-Semitic charges of Dietrich Eckart, editor of Auf gut Deutsch. Eckart, looking to spread the calumny that Jews had not contributed to the German war effort during World War I, offered a prize of 1,000 marks for proof that even a single Jewish family had sent three sons into the army to fight for more than three weeks.

"Rabbi Freund of Hannover immediately gave him a list of twenty families in his own community who sent three sons into the trenches for three weeks and more. Dr. Freund also presented a list of 50 families from various communities, some of which sent seven and eight sons to the trenches and had lost three sons in the service of their country."

Eckart refused to pay the 1,000 marks. The Patriotic League of Jewish Frontline Veterans brought a lawsuit against him and, in 1924, they prevailed. Ordered by a German court to pay 1,000 marks to the Jewish veterans group, Eckart complied.

== Landrabbiner ==
In 1924, while continuing his work as a local rabbi, Samuel Freund became Landrabbiner of Hannover. Landrabbiners were elected by the communities they represented, but they were officers of the state and could not be removed from office without the consent of the German government. Specifically, the Landrabbiner of Hannover was charged with supervising all publicly funded employees working in synagogues, Jewish schools, and Jewish charitable institutions throughout the German state of Lower Saxony. Samuel Freund was the last to ever hold the office of Hannover Landrabbiner and remained Landrabbiner until his death.

Freund was not just an officer in the Landrabbinat Hannover but also a student of the institution. In 1937, Freund published Ein Vierteljahrtausend Hannoversches Landrabbinat, 1687–1937 : Zur 250 jährigen Wiederkehr seiner Begründung dargestellt, a 20-page pamphlet on the history of, and rationale for, the office.

During Freund's time as rabbi and Landrabbiner, Hannover's Jewish population reached its peak of 5,521 members (1925), making the Hannover Jewish community the tenth largest in Germany.

== Liberal Judaism, German Patriotism, and Zionism ==
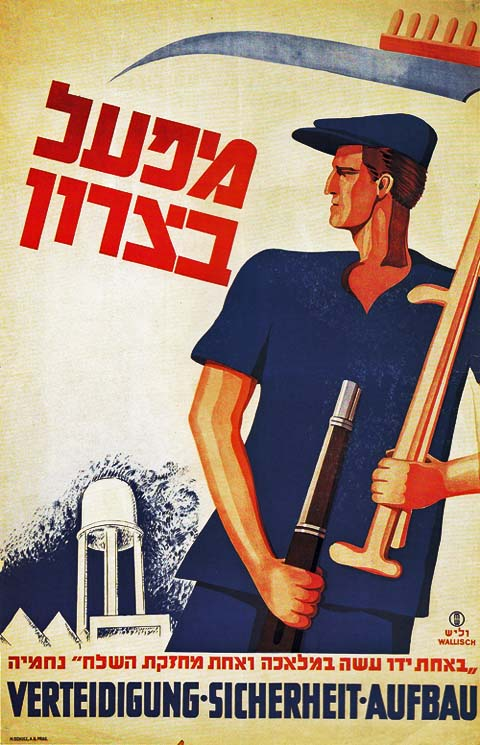
Zionist recruitment poster, 1930: 'Defense - Security - Construction'

Freund was a rabbi in the Liberal Jewish tradition. By the end of the 19th century, most Jews in Germany were members of Liberal or Neo-Orthodox congregations. Liberal Judaism in Germany was an evolving form of Jewish observance, distinguished from German Neo-Orthodox Judaism by the use of Cantors, mixed (male/female) seating, German-language segments of the service, and a common text used by the congregation for prayers. Furthermore, Liberal Judaism rejected (while the Neo-Orthodox accepted) the supremacy of rabbinical courts over the secular laws of Germany. Many Liberal Jews fought for Germany in the first World War, and they emphasized the compatibility of Judaism with German patriotism. Liberal Jews also tended to dress like other German citizens. Both traditions emphasized the religious and cultural aspects of Judaism while rejecting any claims about Jewish nationalism (also known as Zionism).

Samuel Freund, as a patriotic German, opposed the Zionist movement, which was gaining strength in Germany in the 1920s. German Zionists saw Judaism as a national identity first and foremost, albeit one with no physical country to call home. According to German Zionist leaders, it was not possible logically, and psychologically, to be both a Jew and a true member of any other nation. They viewed emigration to Palestine, and the establishment of a Jewish state there, as the only long-term solution to anti-Semitism and the only way for Jews to truly belong to a nation.

Opinions differed within the Freund family as well. Two of Samuel Freund's three adult children - Eduard and Lisa - moved to Palestine in the mid-1930s (Julius, the youngest sibling, moved 1938 to southern California). Samuel Freund visited his children in Palestine on two occasions, the last time in 1937. Each time, Freund chose to return to his congregation in Germany.

== Kristallnacht and the destruction of the Hannover Jewish community ==
Nazi paramilitary forces burned, then dynamited, the Hannover synagogue on 9 November 1938, Kristallnacht, reducing it to rubble. That night, Nazi authorities also arrested the junior rabbi of Hannover, Emil Schorsch, and sent him to Buchenwald concentration camp. German authorities later presented Freund's office with a bill for 26,000 reichsmarks (the current equivalent of $150,000 US) for the synagogue's demolition and clean-up costs.

Samuel Freund spent the last six months of his life tending to his congregation and trying to secure passage out of Germany for his wife and himself. Freund's health was poor, and in late June 1939 he died of heart failure, and was buried in the Jewish cemetery on the Strangriede in Hannover.

In December 1941, the Nazis began, in earnest, to move all of Hannover's Jews to concentration camps. Samuel Freund's wife, Minna, was sent to Theresienstadt on 23 July 1942.

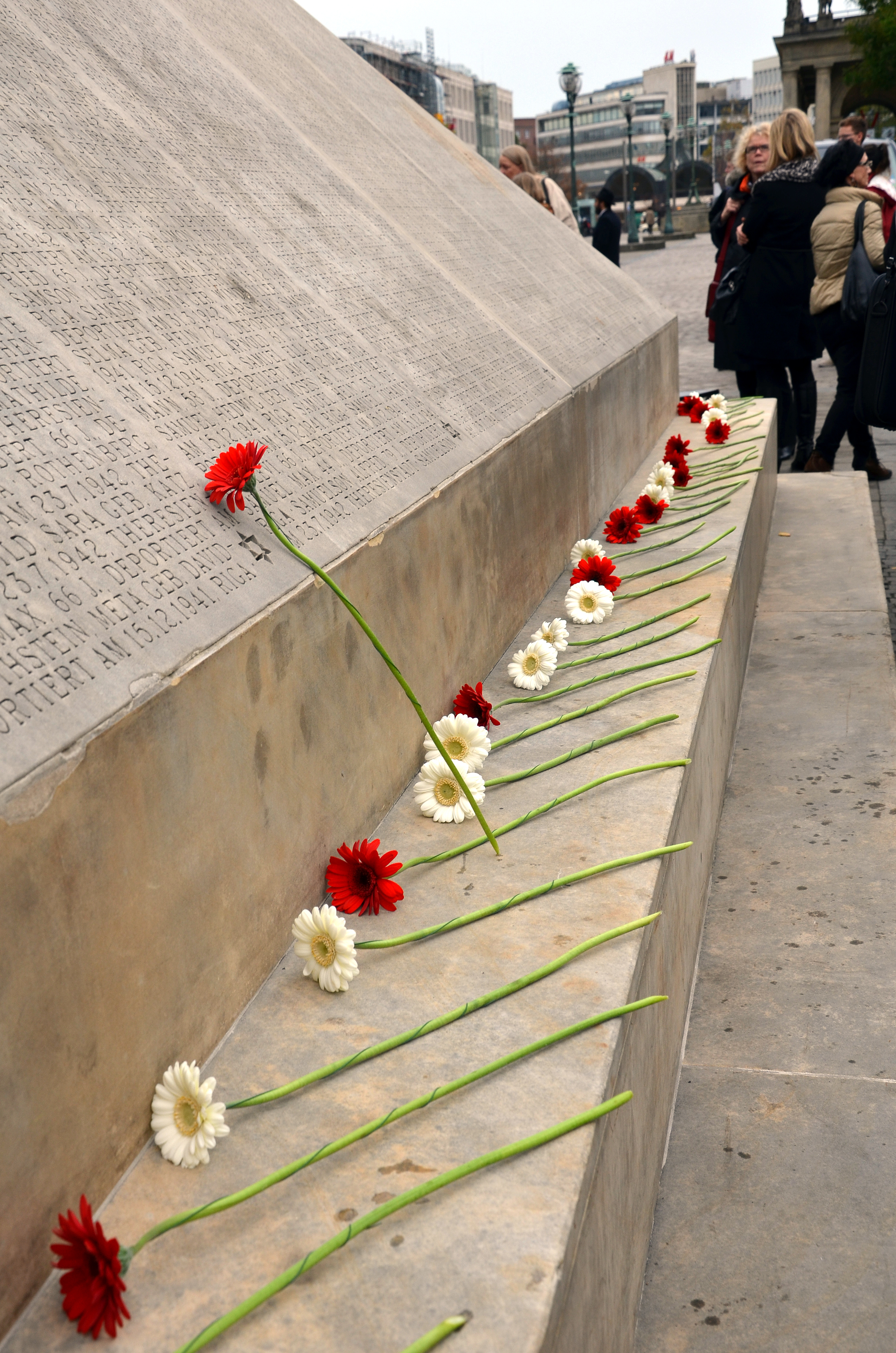
Memorial to the Murdered Jews of Hannover

The Memorial to the Murdered Jews of Hannover, constructed in 1994, lists the names of the 1,935 Hannoverian Jews known to have perished in the Holocaust. The 454th name on the memorial is Minna Freund. She was murdered by the Nazis in Minsk.

The city of Hannover named the street Freundallee in Samuel Freund's honor.
