= Heinz Schöch =

German law professor and criminologist (born 1940)

- Born: 20 August 1940; Sarata, Budjak, Soviet Union
- Education: Leibniz College, Tübingen; University of Tübingen; University of Hamburg
- Occupations: Law professor Criminologist
- Spouse: y
- Children: 3

Heinz Schöch (born 20 August 1940) is a German Law professor and Criminologist. He is an emeritus professor for Criminal law, Criminology, Youth law and sentencing at LMU Munich.

== Life ==
Schöch was born in Bessarabia where his family were part of the ethnic German community. The region had been incorporated into the Soviet Union in June 1940, a couple of months before his birth, as part of the territorial carve-up envisaged in the non-aggression pact concluded between Hitler and Stalin the previous summer. Following the ethnic cleansing of the early 1940s, he ended up in the US occupation zone of postwar Germany. In 1959 Schöch successfully concluded his schooling in Bad Cannstatt (Stuttgart). He moved on to undertake a General Studies course at Leibniz College in Tübingen. This was followed by work for his law degree at the University of Tübingen and the University of Hamburg. Between 1965 and 1969, he worked as a research assistant and lecturer at the University of Tübingen's Criminology Institute, passing Part 1 of the state law exams in 1965 and Part 2 in 1969. He received his doctorate for basic work on sentencing practice and traffic offences ("Strafzumessungspraxis und Verkehrsdelinquenz") in 1972.

Between 1974 and 1994, he held a full professorship in Sentencing and Criminology at the University of Göttingen, also serving as a temporary judge at the city's district court. In 1985 and 1986 he served as dean of the Law Faculty. During his two decades at Göttingen he turned down offers of university posts at Bielefeld University (1977) and the University of Zürich (1981). In 1994, he accepted an appointment at LMU Munich, however, where he succeeded Horst Schüler-Springorum as full professor for Criminology, Youth Justice and Sentencing. Between 1996 and 1998, he was sub-dean of the Jurisprudence faculty and a member of the university senate. Between 2001 and 2003, he was Dean of the Jurisprudence faculty and headed up the newly established "Jurisprudence Seminars" department. Heinz Schöch retired from the professorial post at LMU Munich on 1 October 2008.

In 1979, he was a founder member of the Lower Saxony Criminology Research Institute. Between 1994 and 2006, Schöch was a member of the German Jurists' Council, and between 2001 and 2003, he was president of the Criminology Association. From 2008, he chaired the advisory board of the Max Planck Institute for Foreign and International Criminal Law, based in Freiburg, having been since 1994 a board member of the victims' support organisation, Weisser Ring.

Between 2011 and 2015, he was a member of the long-standing "Evaluierungskommission Freiburger Sportmedizin" established to uncover the truth behind allegations of sports-doping. In his letter of resignation from the commission, which was published, he was critical of the commission chairman Letizia Paoli.
