= Hans Thieme =

German jurist and legal historian

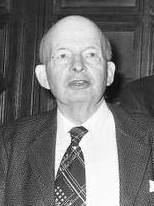
- Hans Thieme in 1985
- Born: 10 August 1906; Naunhof (Leipzig), Saxony, German Empire
- Died: 3 October 2000 (aged 94)
- Education: University of Basel; Ludwig-Maximilians-Universität München; Friedrich Wilhelm University of Berlin; Leipzig University
- Occupations: Jurist; Legal historian University professor
- Spouse: Ursel Rauch (1912–1997)
- Children: 5
- Parents: Karl Thieme (1862-1932) (father); Jenny Respinger (1879–1944) (mother)

Hans Thieme (10 August 1906 - 3 October 2000) was a German jurist and legal historian who became a university professor in 1938. His published output was, in aggregate, considerable, although he tended to prefer to present his research conclusions in articles - sometimes lengthy articles - published in learned journals, rather than in textbooks or monographs. Themes on which he focused included legal history in the context of German history, both medieval and modern, along with European humanism, law codifications and (German) Natural Law theory.

Within the universities sector Thieme was widely respected for the excellence of his teaching, reflected in the number of his students who themselves later achieved eminence as university professors and/or legal historians. He came to wider public attention as a result of a letter he wrote to the national news magazine Der Spiegel in 1957, in which he made public the alleged war crimes committed at the time of the Warsaw Uprising by former SS commander Heinz Reinefarth, who had been (indirectly) Thieme's commanding officer during the later war years. Reinefarth launched a legal action for insult and defamation against Thieme. The legal action failed, but the West German prosecuting authorities launched an investigation against Reinefarth which lasted several years: the accumulating weight of accusations and suspicion forced the former SS-officer to abandon the post-war political career on which he had by this time embarked.

== Life ==
=== Provenance and early years ===
Hans Thieme was born into a Protestant family in Naunhof, a small town just outside Leipzig. His father, Karl Thieme (1862-1932) was a Theologian who taught at Leipzig University. His mother, born Jenny Respinger, was the daughter of a businessman from Basel called Wilhelm Respinger by his marriage to a French woman called Emma Cécile His. His elder brother was Karl Otto Thieme, a German historian and political scientist. The Swiss connection was important to Thieme throughout his life. While still a schoolboy he spent a year attending a secondary school in Basel. With the exception of that year abroad, he received his secondary schooling between 1916 and 1925 at the "Humanist" (classically focused) Queen Carola Gymnasium (secondary school) in Leipzig. Between 1925 and 1928, he studied Jurisprudence at the University of Basel, the Ludwig-Maximilians-Universität München, the Friedrich Wilhelm University of Berlin, and Leipzig University. Early on in his student career, probably at the University of Basel, he came across Franz Beyerle, a young professor who taught Swiss civil law, legal history and commercial law at the university. Beyerle would exercise a lasting (and positive) influence on his subsequent career. He received his doctorate at Leipzig University in 1929 in return for a study on developments in International Arbitration procedure since the war. The work was supervised by Richard Schmidt or Franz Exner. (Sources differ.) It was now at the invitation of Franz Beyerle, who moved to the University of Frankfurt am Main in 1931, that Thieme also transferred to the west, receiving his Habilitation (higher postgraduate degree) from the Universit of Frankfurt am Main. His dissertation, supervised by Beyerle concerned Natural Law and the Historical School ("Naturrecht u. Historische Schule"). Some years, from 1936 to 1937, it was published in two articles. Other things being equal, the Habilitation degree opened the way to a life-long teaching career in the universities sector, and during the next few years Thieme worked at the University of Frankfurt am Main as a "Privatdozent" (university tutor). He combined his teaching work with a period of hands-on postgraduate training, working with the eminent Frankfurt based (till 1933) labour lawyer Hugo Sinzheimer and at the city's Chamber of commerce, where his tutor-mentor was Ernst E. Hirsch, only a few years older than he was, and who much later achieved eminence as a legal sociologist and commercial lawyer in Berlin.

=== Régime change ===
In January 1933 the Hitler government took power and quickly transformed Germany into a one-party dictatorship. To those who followed current affairs it quickly became apparent that antisemitism, hitherto a source of shrill mantras for populist street politicians, had become a core underpinning of government strategy. Thieme was not identified as Jewish, but many of his friends and professional associates were. In the universities and among law professionals there were many who were willing and able to believe that the National Socialists believed their own propaganda, both Sinzheimer and Hirsch left Germany during 1933, returning only after 1945. 1933 was also the year in which Hans Thieme passed his Level II State Law Exams, meaning that in professional terms he was fully qualified to work as a lawyer if necessary.

During 1935, he was also listed as a "Privatdozent" (tutor) at Leipzig University. There are suggestions that Thieme's lack of obvious enthusiasm for the Nation Socialists and the number of Jews among his associates counted against his career progression at Frankfurt. On the other hand, the rapid exodus opened up vacancies. Thieme was still only 28 early in 1934 when he accepted a "Lehrstuhlvertretung" - effectively a professorial teaching chair without the status and remuneration package of a full professor - at the University of Breslau (as Wrocław University was known before) 1945). The Breslau position became vacant through the dismissal of Eugen Rosenstock-Huessy, who by the end of 1933 had emigrated to North America, having secured a teaching post at Harvard. Thieme received an "Extraordinarius" (junior professorship) in 1935.

Despite making no secret of his distaste for the party, Hans Thieme responded to a direct request from the "NS-Dozentenbund" (party lecturers' association) by becoming a (quietly critical) party member in 1937. His Ordinary [full] University Professorship in Legal History, Civil and Commercial Law at the University of Breslau followed in 1938.

=== Ursel ===
During his time at Breslau Hans Thieme met Ursel Emming (born Ursula Rauch: 1912–1997), a law student originally from Kulm - and later a professional lawyer - to whom he taught commercial law. Their marriage was solemnised in 1937, conducted by the pastor of the Confessing Church at Rosenbach (Eulengebirge), a village in the mountains on the southern rim of western Silesia. It was followed by the births of the couple's five children and lasted for more than 60 years. A friend of the couple later recalled Ursel as "a courageous woman who towards the end of the war [by which time her husband had been conscripted for military service] walked with her children and a perambulator all the way from Stettin to Switzerland and safety".

=== War ===
Starting in Summer 1936 Hans Thieme found himself repeatedly conscripted for military training exercises during the summer months. At the end of August 1939 he was conscripted into the Silesian Militia as a "reserve officer". A couple of weeks later Poland was invaded from the west by Germany and sixteen days later, by the Soviet Union from the east and south. (It subsequently emerged that Europe's two leading dictatorships were acting in concert during this period.) Thieme was involved in the German military operation from the outset, although there is little surviving information as to the nature of his military involvement which was, in any event, of limited duration at this point. By the end of 1939 the Polish campaign was determined to have been completed. Early in 1940 Thieme was permitted to return to Breslau and resume his teaching. Still in 1940, he was offered and accepted a professorship in German Law, Civil Law, Commercial Law and Church Law at the University of Leipzig. The professorship was one that had been vacated a couple of years earlier by his dormer tutor and mentor Franz Beyerle. It was not the last time that Thieme would make a career move that involved following in Beyerle's footsteps. The transfer to Leipzig appears to have represented a promotion to a more all-encompassing professorship at a more prestigious university, located close to his childhood home. (His mother was still alive.)

After 1942, with a rapid reduction in the number of available fighting men underway, Thieme was recalled for military service. Between 1942 and 1945 he served as an army officer on the Russian front, though he continued to be listed as a Leipzig University professor throughout these years. Although outside the parameters of the rest of his published work, Thieme's recollections of the Warsaw Uprising of August 1944, for some of which he was present in the city, have attracted the interest of historians. By the time the European war ended in May 1945 Thieme was a British Prisoner of War. He was released relatively quickly in Konstanz, close to Switzerland where his wife and children had sought refuge from the British and American bombing of Leipzig during the closing months of the war.

=== Post-war ===
For the survivors 1945 was a time for new beginnings. In professional terms a new beginning arrived in the form of a "Lehrstuhlvertretung" (filling in a vacated teaching chair) offer from the University of Bonn which Thieme accepted, though he left Bonn in 1946. Shortly after accepting the offer from Bonn he received the offer of an ordinary [full] professorship from the University of Göttingen. This came with several advantages, not least of which was that the University of Göttingen authorities were content that he should take a study term at the University of Basel during the winter term of 1946–47 in order to complete a piece of work on which he had by this time embarked. He moved on again in 1953, this time to the University of Freiburg where, again, he was appointed to a full professorship in succession to Franz Beyerle. Hans Thieme remained at the University of Freiburg as Professor of Legal History between 1953 and 1974. His two decades at the University of Freiburg marked the high point of his academic achievements and reputation.

During 1960–61 Thieme served for a year as University Rector at the University of Freiburg. Among colleagues and students in the faculty he would be warmly remembered for the "Thieme-Seminar" teaching group which he created and which became known for the diverse range of challenging and stimulating topics which it addressed. It produced more than a hundred successful doctoral students over the years. Of these, 67 were supervised by Thieme himself. The more notable among Thieme's students include or included Karl Kroeschell, Bernhard Diestelkamp, Adolf Laufs, Clausdieter Schott and Gerhard Schmidt. He was, in addition, energetic in nurturing international ties among scholars, networked with legal historians from as far afield as Japan. It was a Belgian legal historian who wrote of his having "acted as a cultural ambassador of his country" after 1945, keen that Germany - or at least the western part of it in which he had made his home following partition - should be speedily and unreservedly readmitted to the "community of nations". He engaged actively as an executive committee member of the Paris-based "Société Jean Bodin" and the "Association internationale d’Histoire du Droit", and frequently delivered guest-lectures on both sides of the Rhine in German, French or English, according to his audience. It was a mark both of the esteem in which he was held by colleagues and of the effectiveness of his international networking that during his years as a Freiburg professor Hans Thieme also acquired honorary doctorates from the University of Granada, the University of Montpellier, the University of Basel, and the University of Paris. In 1974, aged 68, Hans Thieme retired from his professorial chair at the University of Freiburg.

=== Zeitschrift der Savigny-Stiftung für Rechtsgeschichte ===
For many years, between 1954 and 1977, Thieme was a co-editor of the (at that time) Vienna-based "Zeitschrift der Savigny-Stiftung für Rechtsgeschichte", described as "one of the oldest legal journals in the world".

== Recognition, celebration and memberships ==
Marks of appreciation for Hand Thieme were not restricted to his various honorary doctorates. In 1976 Yitzhak Nebenzahl, in his capacity as State Comptroller of Israel, planted 70 trees in the "Jerusalem Forest of Martyrs" (Ya'ar HaKdoshim), reportedly in Thieme's honour.

Hans Thieme was a member of the Heidelberg Academy of Sciences and Humanities and a corresponding member of the Austrian Academy of Sciences and Humanities.

State honours conferred on him included, in 1972, the West German Order of Merit and, in 1984, the Order of Merit of Baden-Württemberg.
