= Stefan Rohrbacher =

German Judaist

Stefan Rohrbacher (born 10 November 1958) is a German Judaist.

== Life ==
Stefan Rohrbacher was born in Bad Schwalbach, a small spa town a short distance to the northwest of Wiesbaden. He attended university at Cologne and Berlin, his field of work including Oriental studies, Jewish studies and Art history. He received his doctorate in 1991 from Berlin's (misleadingly named) Technical University. His doctoral dissertation, subsequently reworked for commercial publication, dealt with "violence in the Biedermeier period" in the context of an increase in antisemitic riots at that time. In 1991 he accepted a position as an academic research assistant with the Berlin Historical Commission, remaining there till 1993. Between 1994 and 1997 he worked with the Hamburg-based Institute for the History of German Jews ("Institut für die Geschichte der deutschen Juden" / IGdJ).

He moved on again in 1997, becoming Professor for Jewish studies at Duisburg till 2002. He then took a professorial post at the Heinrich-Heine University in Düsseldorf. He is a former chairman of the Association of Judaists in Germany ("Verband der Judaisten in Deutschland") and a member of the board of the Academic Working Group with the Leo Baeck Institute.

Rohrbacher's most important research themes included Jewish history in central Europe, focusing primarily on the early modern period. He has also worked in depth on the Jewish enlightenment and the evolution of antisemitism, again with a particular focus on central Europe.

== The case of Annette Schavan ==
Annette Schavan was a government minister, responsible till 2013 for the Education and Research portfolio. She received a doctorate from Düsseldorf university in 1980. In May 2012 allegations surfaced that Schavan's doctoral dissertation had been excessively plagiaristic. Although the allegations were anonymous, the case captured a place in the news agenda and the responsible "doctoral committee" at the University of Düsseldorf undertook a five-month investigation of the matter. The committee was chaired by the vice-dean of the university's Philosophy Faculty, Stefan Rohrbacher. Rohrbacher took the lead in drafting the committee's report: its conclusions were widely reported, giving Rohrbacher a hitherto improbably high public profile. Schavan's doctoral dissertation was determined to reflect a "plagiarising approach" (eine "plagiierende Vorgehensweise") and "intent to deceive" ("leitende Täuschungsabsicht"). The report's issuance was upstaged by its premature leaking, which unleashed a new wave of public discussion and criticism, some of it directed against Rohrbacher's committee. There were those who felt the extent of Schavan's plagiarism had been far less flagrant than that in the recent case of Karl-Theodor zu Guttenberg, and that she was being judged harshly more because of her own robust condemnation of zu Guttenberg than on the basis of analysis of her own work. Helmut Schwarz of the Alexander von Humboldt Foundation was critical of the procedure followed by university committee, complaining that there had been no "outsider" member of it, pointing out that Schavan had not been given sufficient opportunity to state her own case, and implying that Stefan Rohrbacher faced a clear conflict of interest in the matter, since he himself had first scrutinised the dissertation under discussion and then chaired the committee that evaluated his findings, while simultaneously holding a top position within the faculty for which the committee had prepared its report. Rohrbacher did not involve himself in the media storm, but others were less reticent in expressing support for the university's position. Bernhard Kempen, long-standing president of the German Universities Association ("Deutscher Hochschulverband"), insisted that Schavan, like anyone else confronting serious plagiarism allegations, deserved a fair process, and warned against a premature media acquittal orchestrated by "politicians and fringe academics". The leaking of the committee's draft report resulted from the actions of one individual and certainly could not be blamed on Rohrbacher. Factually unsupported criticisms and procedural recommendations plastered across the media displayed an unjustified lack of respect for the University of Düsseldorf.

Shrill media posturing directed against Rohrbacher and against the procedural practices of Düsseldorf University certainly did nothing to change the proper legal basis that underpinned the exercise, and if it was intended that the public criticisms should dissuade the university from revoking Schavan's doctorate, then the critics failed in their objective. Schavan's subsequent decision to appeal against the university's decision in the district administrative court also failed. The court ruled that she had failed to establish the procedural errors alleged. Without exception, the court backed the findings of plagiarism and Rohrbacher's assessment of them. The doctoral committee decision accordingly received judicial endorsement.

== Output (selection) ==
=== as author ===
- Juden in Neuss. Verlag Galerie Küppers, Neuss 1986, ISBN 3-9801294-0-3.
- mit Michael Schmidt: Judenbilder. Kulturgeschichte antijüdischer Mythen und antisemitischer Vorurteile (= Rowohlts Enzyklopädie. 498). Rowohlt, Reinbek 1991, ISBN 3-499-55498-4.
- Gewalt im Biedermeier. Antijüdische Ausschreitungen in Vormärz und Revolution (1815–1848/49). Campus-Verlag, Frankfurt/New York 1993, ISBN 3-593-34886-1 (zugl. Dissertation, TU Berlin 1990).
- Die jüdische Landgemeinde im Umbruch der Zeit. Traditionelle Lebensform, Wandel und Kontinuität im 19. Jahrhundert. Stadtarchiv, Göppingen 2000, ISBN 3-933844-33-9.
- Steine auf dem Paradies. Der jüdische Friedhof zu Ebern. Bürgerverein Ebern, o.O. 2016.

=== as editor-compiler ===
- with Michael Brenner: Wissenschaft vom Judentum. Annäherungen nach dem Holocaust. Vandenhoeck & Ruprecht, Göttingen 2000, ISBN 3-525-20807-3.
- Germania Judaica. Mohr, Tübingen 1995, 2003, 2009.
