= Adolf Leschnitzer =

German historian (1899–1980)

- Born: Adolf Friedrich Leschnitzer; 3 February 1899; Posen, Province of Posen, Prussia, Germany
- Died: 24 July 1980 (aged 81); Centerport, New York, Suffolk County, New York, U.S.
- Education: Heidelberg University, Germany
- Occupations: Writer; researcher; historian; teacher
- Spouse: Maria Elisabeth Bratz (1909–2005)
- Children: Michael Lesch (1938-2017)
- Parent(s): Oscar Leschnitzer (1864–1934); Natalie Fuchs

Adolf Leschnitzer (3 February 1899 – 24 July 1980) was a German-American writer-researcher, historian and teacher, specialising in Jewish and German studies.

== Biography ==
Adolf Friedrich Leschnitzer was born in Posen (as Poznań was known) before 1945). He was born into a Jewish merchant family of Polish provenance. Oscar Leschnitzer (1864–1934), his father, was a pharmacist who moved with his family to Berlin in 1910. Adolf attended the Frederick William Gymnasium (secondary school) in Posen and, then, after the family moved, the Empress Augusta Gymnasium (secondary school) in Berlin-Charlottenburg. He graduated from the school "cum laude" in 1917. However, the war was raging, and he was now conscripted into the army, serving till 1918.

Between 1918 and 1923 he studied Germanistics, History, Philosophy and Pedagogy at Berlin and Heidelberg. It was from Heidelberg University that in 1923 he received his doctorate, with a dissertation on Medieval interpretation of the Song of Songs ("Untersuchungen über das Hohelied in Minneliedern"). In or before 1926 he passed Levels I and II of the National professional exams for work in teaching. He had by then embarked on a career as a secondary school teacher of German and History in Berlin. He qualified as a "student assessor" (examiner) in 1927. Leschnitzer gained further promotions as he taught at a succession of Berlin secondary schools till 1933. During this period he was also involved in teacher training acted as a consultant in respect of the teaching of German literary history.

After several years during which politics had become ever more polarised and parliament gridlocked, the National Socialists took power in January 1933 and lost little time in transforming Germany into a one-party dictatorship. Public antisemitism, till now chiefly apparent through a succession of populist political slogans, now became a key underpinning of government policy. The so-called Law for the Restoration of the Professional Civil Service ("Gesetz zur Wiederherstellung des Berufsbeamtentums") passed in April 1933 provided expressly for the immediate dismissal of "non-Aryans" from a wide range of public-sector jobs. Adolf Leschnitzer was dismissed from his Berlin teaching post during 1933.

That same year he accepted an invitation from Leo Baeck, president of the "Reichsvertretung der Deutschen Juden" (loosely, "National representation of German Jews"), to work as an organiser of Jewish education. He was given charge of the schools department. This meant he was responsible for the education of approximately 38,000 school children in 130 schools. Critical decisions in respect of languages and education had to be addressed in the teaching schedules. He also found himself at the centre of heated debates on religious instruction, arbitrating between Liberal and Orthodox priorities. Between 1934 and November 1938 Leschnitzer published 29 text booklets for the Jewish schools. He himself authored booklet 10: "Das Judentum im Weltbild des Mittelalters" ("Judaism in the late medieval context"), published in 1935.

In 1939 Leschnitzer emigrated with his wife, the literature scholar Maria Bratz, and their baby son. They travelled via the Netherlands to their initial destination, which was England, where according to one source Leschnitzer supported himself undertaking library work in Cambridge. They moved on in 1940 to the United States where Leschnitzer immediately set about creating and organising the "American Institute of Modern Languages" in New York. From 1940 till 1952, with backing vfrom the "New World Club", he directed what was in effect a private language school for newly arrived immigrants, most of whom were refugees, often from political and/or race-based persecution in Germany and central Europe more generally. Alongside this work, in 1943 he took a teaching position just outside New York City on its southside at Rutgers University–New Brunswick. The United States had entered the war in support of Great Britain and the Soviet Union at the end of 1941. Leschnitzer taught foreign languages, which involved work for the German Section of the Foreign Area and Language Curriculum of the Army Specialized Training Program. He combined the teaching with work as a consultant to the US United States Department of War and to the United States Office of War Information.

The war in Europe ended in May 1945. The western two thirds of Germany were now divided into four military occupation zones, with the United States taking on control of most of the southern part of the country. 1945 was also the year in which Leschnitzer authored a memorandum entitled "An Immediate Program for the Reconstruction of the German School System". He was keen that the next generation of Germans should have a closer understanding of the interplay of German history with Jewish history and culture, as a way to bring "the two peoples together".

In 1946 he took a job as a languages teacher at the City College of New York where he continued to work till his retirement in 1966. Initially he was employed as Professor of Germanistics. In 1958 he took over as head of the department for German and Slavonic Languages. He was a member of various professional associations, serving as president of the "New York Society of Teachers of German" between 1957 and 1964. In 1955 he joined the executive board ("Vorstand") at the Leo Baeck Institute in New York, of which he had been a founding member. Starting in 1952 he also taught a succession of summer courses as a guest professor at the US-sponsored Free University of (West) Berlin (FU). Between 1955 and 1972 he combined his responsibilities in New York with an active role as Honorary Professor for the History and Culture of Judaism at the FU's "Institute for Jewish Studies" ("Institut für Judaistik"). The Shoah was still a recent trauma for millions of survivors, and during the 1950s only very few Jews, of whom Adolf Leschnitzer was one, felt able and willing to work regularly – albeit not permanently – in Berlin.

== Publications (selection) ==
Adolf Leschnitzer also published written contributions to magazines and journals on topics that included German-Jewish history, Anti-Semitism, Heinrich Heine (and other German-Jewish writers) and Goethe. Over the years he also produced one or two more substantial works:

- Untersuchungen über das "Hohelied in Minneliedern", ein Beitrag zur Historienbibel-Forschung. Inaugural-Dissertation – Universität Heidelberg 1924.
- Richtlinien zur Aufstellung von Lehrplänen für jüdische Volksschulen. Berlin: Reichsvertretung d. Dt. Juden, 1934
- Das Judentum im Weltbild Europas. Jüdische Lesehefte, 10. Das Judentum im Weltbild des Mittelalters. Berlin: Schocken 1935
- Zu Martin Bubers 60. Geburtstag, 8. Februar 1938: ein Rundbrief an die jüdischen Lehrer. Berlin: Reichsvertretung d. Juden in Deutschland. Schulabtlg, [1938]
- Saul und David. Die Problematik der deutsch-jüdischen Lebensgemeinschaft. Heidelberg: L. Schneider, 1954
- The Magic Background of Modern Anti-Semitism: An Analysis of the German-Jewish Relationship. New York: International Universities Press, 1956

== Awards and honours (selection) ==
- 1951 Bollingen Fellowship
- 1956 Order of Merit of the Federal Republic of Germany
- 1961 Fulbright Fellowship
- 1972 Honorary Doctorate Free University of Berlin

== Personal ==
Leschnitzer married Dr. Maria E. Bratz (1909–2005) in 1937. Their son Michael Leschnitzer (later known as Michael Lesch), who became a lawyer, was born in Berlin in 1938.

Adolf Leschnitzer's younger brother was the pacifist writer and Communist activist Franz Leschnitzer (1905–1967).
