= Helga Grebing =

German historian (1930–2017)

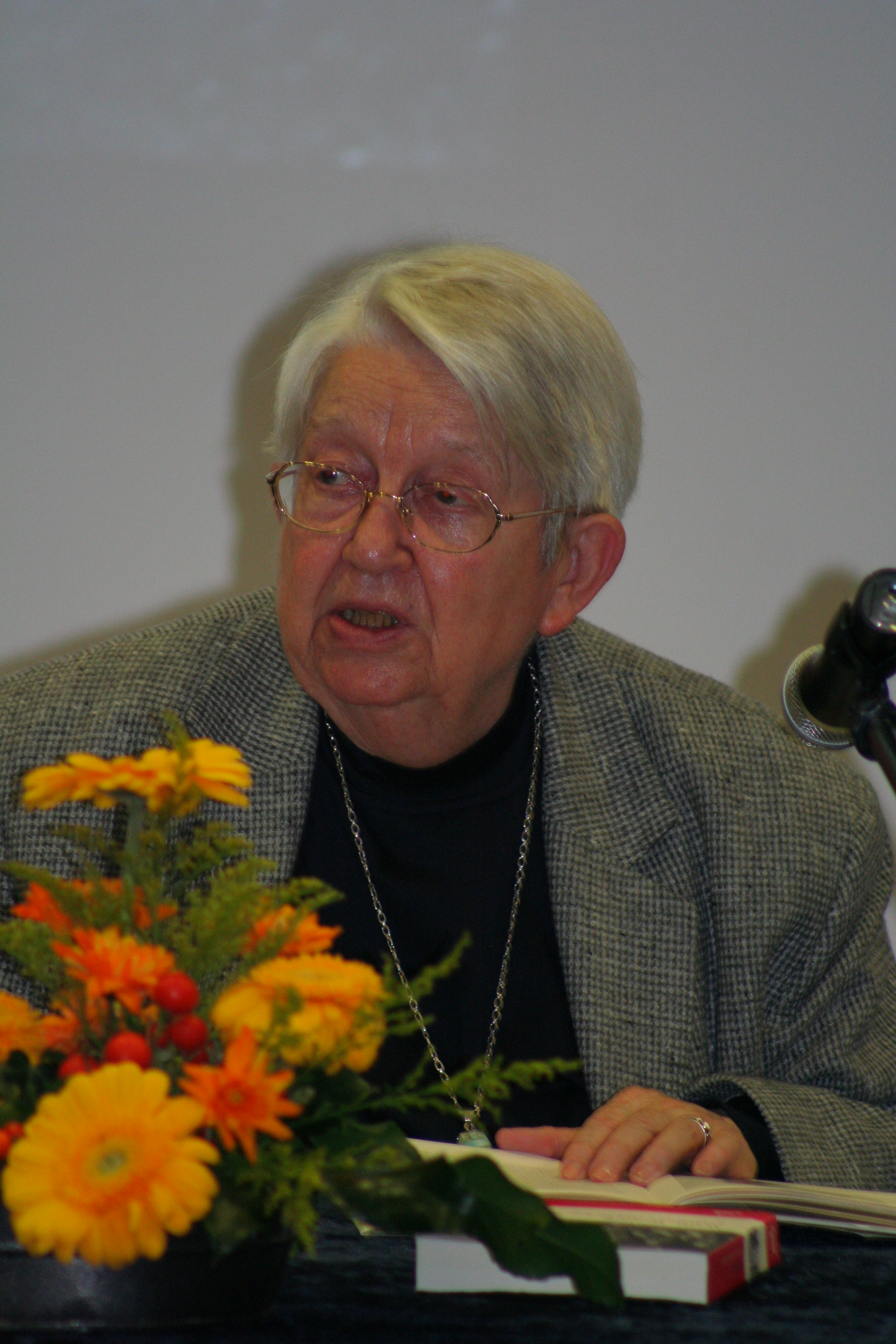
- Grebing at a book launch in 2009
- Born: 27 February 1930; Berlin, Germany
- Died: 25 September 2017 (aged 87); Berlin, Germany
- Political party: Social Democratic Party of Germany

Academic background
- Education: Free University of Berlin
- Doctoral advisor: Hans Herzfeld

Academic work
- Discipline: History
- Sub-discipline: Labour history; social history
- Institutions: University of Göttingen; Ruhr University Bochum
- Doctoral students: Stefanie Schüler-Springorum

Helga Grebing (27 February 1930 – 25 September 2017) was a German historian and university professor (Göttingen, Bochum). A focus of her work is on social history and, more specifically, on the history of the labour movement.

== Life ==
=== Provenance and early years ===
Grebing was born on 27 February 1930 in Pankow, Berlin, to a Roman Catholic father, who worked in the building trade, and a Protestant mother. She has referred to her paternal grandmother "without wishing to sound negative", as a "bigot catholic" ("eigentlich bigott-katholisch"). Her mother was a factory worker, who later switched jobs, moving into the food retailing sector. Grebing grew up in and around Berlin.

Her father was involved in a traffic accident when she was five, and was badly burned. A burn turned septic, and he died of the resulting blood poisoning. After this she relocated with her mother to live with relative in the nearby district of Miersdorf. She attended school in the area, including a spell at the commercially oriented secondary school (Handelsschule) in Berlin-Neukölln.

The Second World War provided the backdrop for her early teenage years: during the final two years of the war all the schools in the area were closed and she worked as an "armaments worker" in Wildau at the huge Schwartzkopff Locomotive Plant. She was also required at this time to belong to the BDM national youth organisation for girls. She later said that it was her experiences in the BDM which sensitised her very early on to the potential for a return dictatorship inherent in the circumstances surrounding and following the creation of the Socialist Unity Party (SED) in April 1946.

The war ended in May 1945. In 1946, she completed her schooling, emerging with a qualification for clerical work. Directly after that, now aged 16 and the youngest in her cohort, Grebing responded to a newspaper advertisement and enrolled at the Workers' and Farmers' Faculty, a department of Berlin University, where she received a more academically focused year of secondary schooling. In 1947, she earned her "Abitur", which opened the way for a university-level education. This was part of an unusual scheme that was expressly aimed at school leavers to whom the opportunity of a university education would have been denied during the Nazi years on ground of politics, race or social background. Admission to the course involved an exam: one of her examiners was Hilde Benjamin, a name which later came to wider prominence in connection with the East German show trials of the early 1950s.

Grebing moved on to the main university where she studied history, germanistics, philosophy and civil law. In 1948, she joined the Social Democratic Party (SPD). During the early postwar years a young activist in the Berlin SPD, recently returned from a wartime exile in Norway, was Willy Brandt, with whom at times Grebing found herself working closely on party matters. Much later she would publish a biography of Brandt. The war had ended with Germany divided into military occupation zones. Berlin itself was similarly subdivided. Berlin University had ended up in the Soviet occupation zone, and as NKVD activities within the university intensified, and the nature and extent of the Berlin's political and economic division continued to crystallize, in 1949 Grebing was one of several thousand able to transfer to the newly launched Free University of Berlin set up in the city's US ("western") sector. Here she pursued her studies.

For her doctorate, which she received at the end of 1952, she was supervised by Hans Herzfeld. Her dissertation concerned the Catholic Centre Party and the working classes in the Weimar Republic.

=== Professional career ===
Between 1953 and 1959 she worked as an editor for contemporary history and politics with the Munich publishers Olzog Verlag. She worked as an editor for the Munich-based academic journal Politische Studien. Starting in 1958, she taught at the Academy for Political Education in Tutzing and at other educational institutions operated by the West German Trades Union Confederation and the SPD (party). She was also involved in teacher training.

Between 1959 and 1961, she headed the "Hans and Sophie Scholl" International Student Accommodation Centre, and was at the same time active in the Working Group of Social Democratic Academics ("Arbeitsgemeinschaft Sozialdemokratischer Akademiker") in Munich. Between 1961 and 1965 she was a department chief at the massive Munich Popular Academy ("Münchner Volkshochschule"), with departmental responsibility for Politics, Sociology, Contemporary history, Economics and Law. Between 1964 and 1966 she undertook consultancy work for the Hessen State Political Education Centre.

In 1967, she started work on her habilitation dissertation in political sciences, which bore the title "Konservative Kritik an der Demokratie in der Bundesrepublik nach 1945". Her assessors were Iring Fetscher, Rainer Lepsius, and the supervisor of her doctorate back in 1952, Hans Herzfeld. The habilitation came through just two years later, in 1969.

=== University career ===
At the start of 1971 she was given a teaching post in Political Sciences at Frankfurt (Main), and in July 1971 this was upgraded to a professorship. Later the same year she was given a teaching chair at University of Göttingen, and in 1971 it was at Göttingen that she accepted a full professorship in modern history. The focus of her university based research at Göttingen was on social history during the nineteenth and twentieth centuries. She also involved herself in university administration, at some points being a member of the university senate.

In 1988 she switched to the Ruhr University Bochum where she took on a professorship for comparable history of the international labour movement and the social condition of the working classes. This was tied in with a position as head of the university's "Research Institute on the European Labour Movement" ("Instituts zur Erforschung der europäischen Arbeiterbewegung" - subsequently renamed). She retired from the university in 1995, but has continued to write.

=== Beyond university ===
Along with her university research and teaching, Helge Grebing was a member of the Historical Commission of the SPD Party Executive. For a time she was also a member of the party's Fundamental Values Commission ("Grundwertekommission"). She served on numerous other academic and arts related organisations and advisory bodies.

Grebing has worked as a biographer and as a literary executor. She co-edited a volume published of the writings of the art historian Wilhelm Worringer. Her biography of Willy Brandt appeared in 2008.

Grebig died on 25 September 2017.
