= Ernst Heymann =

German jurist

Ernst Heymann (6 April 1870 - 2 March 1946) was a German jurist from Berlin.

In 1889 he passed his matriculation examination at the Mary Magdalene School in Wrocław (then Breslau, in the German Empire). He then studied law at the Silesian Friedrich-Wilhelm University in Breslau until 1892. Heymann was appointed professor at the Friedrich Wilhelm University of Berlin in 1899. In 1902, he was appointed to the Chair of Law at the Albertus University of Königsberg, and two years later moved to the University of Marburg. In 1914, he returned to Berlin at the Friedrich Wilhelm University.

From 1918, Heymann was a regular member of the Prussian Academy of Sciences. From 1926 to 1938, he was secretary of the Philosophical and Historical Class of the Academy. He acted as vice president from 1939 to 1942. Heymann was longtime chairman of its commissions for the Deutsches Rechtswörterbuch ("German Law Dictionary"), Deutsche Kommission and Vocabularium Iurisprudentiae Romanae and acted as a justice expert at the Academy. Heymann was a Perpetual Secretary of the Prussian Academy of Sciences in 1933 when, on two occasions, he wrote missives castigating Albert Einstein following Einstein's resignation from the Academy.

Beginning in 1926, Heymann was scientific adviser to the Institute for Comparative and International Private Law of the Kaiser Wilhelm Society for the Advancement of Science, today known as the Max Planck Society. From 1937 to 1946, he was the director of the Institute and a Scientific Member of the Society. From 1929 to 1932, and again from 1943, Heymann was also a member of the senate of the Society. Heymann was the successor (initially acting successor) to Ernst Rabel until 1938, who had been forced by the Nazi regime to resign his post.

From 1931 to 1933, Heymann was President of the Law Society of Berlin. He was also a member of the Central Board and Director of the "Leges" section of Monumenta Germaniae Historica series. After the Nazis came to power, he was one of the founding members of the Committee on Legal Philosophy within the Nazi Academy for German Law in May 1934. In 1939 was Heymann was one of the authors of a Festschrift for Hitler's 50th birthday.

During the evacuation of Berlin in 1944, he moved with the staff of the institute of Tübingen.

== Literary works ==
- Englisches Privatrecht, 1904
- Das ungarische Privatrecht, 1917
- Handelsgesetzbuch, 1926
- Handelsrecht, 1938
