= Hugo Sinzheimer =

German academic and author

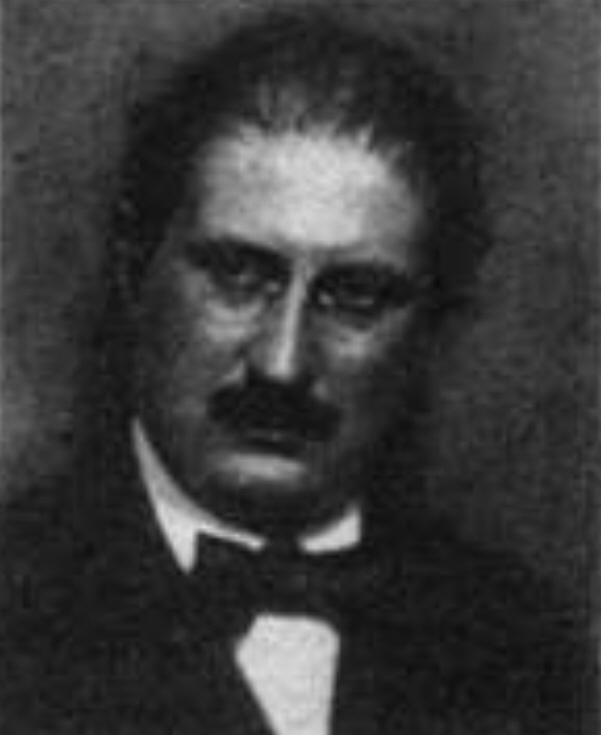
- Sinzheimer in 1919
- Born: 12 April 1875; Worms, Hesse, German Empire
- Died: 16 September 1945 (aged 70); Bloemendaal, Netherlands

Academic background
- Education: Heidelberg University

Academic work
- Discipline: Law
- Sub-discipline: Labour law; sociology of law
- Institutions: Goethe University Frankfurt
- Influenced: Franz Neumann

Hugo D. Sinzheimer (German: [ˈzɪntshaɪmɐ]; 12 April 1875 – 16 September 1945) was a German legal scholar who contributed to the writing of the Weimar Constitution. He was a leading proponent of the concept of social law.

== Biography ==
Sinzheimer was one of the first academics specialising in labour law; he published an introduction to this field (Der korporative Arbeitsnormenvertrag) in 1907. He was one of the members of the Weimar National Assembly, which promulgated the Weimar Constitution. As a major influence on the drafting of the labour law section of the constitution, he is considered to be "the father of labour law" in Germany. He was inspired by the ideals of the dignity and liberty of every human being, and was a humanist in the widest sense of the word.

As a lawyer, he frequently represented political and union-related groups. He joined the Social Democratic Party of Germany in 1914. From 1920 onward, he was professor of labour law and sociology of law at Frankfurt University.

In March 1933, with the rize to power of the Nazi's, Sinzheimer, was arrested, since he was a leading social democrat, a labour union advisor, and a Jew. After his release he emigrated to the Netherlands. When the Nazis conquered The Netherlands in May 1940 he was taken prissoner and spend a few months in jail in the German town of Kleve. After a few months he was released. In August 1942 with the help of Dutch friends his wife Paula and he went into hiding. After the liberation of the Netherlands in May 1945 he was exhausted and severely malnourished. He did not recover from his poor health and died several months later in September 16, 1945.

== Legacy ==
The Sinzheimer Institute of the University of Amsterdam's Law Department is named after him in his honour.

The Hugo Sinzheimer Institute for Labor Law and Social Security Law in Frankfurt is named after him.

There is a moot court competition named after Sinzheimer. 13 European universities compete in an annual case competition - the Hugo Sinzheimer Moot Court Competition. The Moot Court Competition is a competition in European Labour Law for law students across Europe.

Archival material relating to Hugo Sinzheimer's professional activity as a labour lawyer and professor is held by the Leo Baeck Institute in New York.

Personal archival material from the estate of Hugo Sinzheimer is held by the Archive of Social Democracy at the Friedrich Ebert Foundation in Bonn, source: www.hugo-sinzheimer-institut.de/sinzheimer-nachlass-68261.htm.

A more extended biography is to be found at the Sinzheimer Repository website.

A complete list of Hugo Sinzheimer's publications is to be found at the Sinzheimer Repository website.

== Publications ==
- Lohn und Aufrechnung. Ein Beitrag zur Lehre vom gewerblichen Arbeitsvertrag auf reichsrechtlicher Grundlage (Diss. Univ. Heidelberg, Berlin 1902)
- Der korporative Arbeitsnormenvertrag (1907)
- Brauchen wir ein Arbeitstarifgesetz? Rechtsfragen des Tarifvertrags (1913)
- Ein Arbeitstarifgesetz. Die Idee der sozialen Selbstbestimmung im Recht (1916)
- Grundzüge des Arbeitsrechts (1921)
- Der Kampf um das neue Arbeitsrecht (1924) Die Arbeit
- Das Problem des Menschen im Recht (1933)
- Jüdische Klassiker der deutschen Rechtswissenschaft (1938).
- Theorie der Gesetzgebung. Die Idee der Evolution im Recht (1949 postum)
- Otto Kahn-Freund und Thilo Ramm, Arbeitsrecht und Rechtsoziologie. Gesammelte Aufsätze und Reden (Europäische Verlagsanstalt 1976) 2 volumes

== See also ==
- European labour law
- German labour law
- United Kingdom labour law
