= Stefanie Schüler-Springorum =

German historian (born 1962)

- Born: Stefanie Schüler-Springorum; 1962 (age 63–64); Hamburg, West Germany
- Education: Ruhr University Bochum (PhD)
- Occupations: Historian; Writer
- Parent: Horst Schüler-Springorum

Stefanie Schüler-Springorum (born 1962) is a German historian.

Since June 2011 she has headed the Berlin-based Centre for Anti-Semitism Research (Zentrum für Antisemitismusforschung / ZfA).

== Life ==
Stefanie Schüler-Springorum was born in Hamburg, West Germany. Her father was the German Professor of Jurisprudence and Criminality, Horst Schüler-Springorum. She grew up in Hamburg, Gottingen, and Munich. Her university level studies covered Medieval and Modern History, Ethnology, and Political Science, taking her to Göttingen and Barcelona. She received her doctorate in 1993 from Bochum in return for a substantial piece of work on the Jewish minority in Königsberg between 1871 and 1945. Her doctorate was supervised by Helga Grebing (who did much to focus her choice of topic) and Hans Mommsen. The dissertation won her the distinction of a "summa cum laude" grading.

Between 1994 and 1995 she worked as a research assistant at the "Topography of Terror" ("Topographie des Terrors") Foundation in Berlin. where she remains a member of the advisory board. Since 1999 she has also held a teaching post at Technische Universität Berlin. In 2001, she took over from Monika Richarz as director of the Institute for the History of German Jews (Institut für die Geschichte der deutschen Juden / IGdJ) in Hamburg. She also, in 2009, took over as chair of the Leo Baeck Institute's Academic Working Group in Germany (Wissenschaftliche Arbeitsgemeinschaft des Leo Baeck Instituts in Deutschland), of which she had been a member since 1996. For many years she has taught at the history department of Hamburg University. In June 2011 Stefanie Schüler-Springorum succeeded Wolfgang Benz as director of the Centre for Anti-Semitism Research (Zentrum für Antisemitismusforschung / ZfA) at Technische Universität Berlin.

== Focus ==
Her work is centred on German history and German Jewish history in the nineteenth and twentieth centuries. She has also undertaken work on gender history and on twentieth century Spanish history, with a particular focus on the Spanish Civil War.
