= Gotthold Bohne =

German law professor

Gotthold Bohne (25 July 1890 - 28 August 1957) was a German law professor.

== Life ==
Gotthold Hermann Bohne was born in Burgstädt near Chemnitz. He studied at the universities of Greifswald, Jena und Leipzig a palette of subjects covering Theology, Philosophy, Medicine and Jurisprudence. His academic progress was interrupted by the First World War during which he undertook military service. After the war ended he received his doctorate in Jurisprudence from the University of Leipzig in 1920. His habilitation in criminal justice, from the same institution. followed just a year later, clearing the way for an academic career.

In 1922 he was working as a probationary judge ("Gerichtsassessor") before accepting an invitation to transfer to the University of Cologne in 1923 where he was given a professorship and directorship of the new Institute for Criminal Sciences. Plans existed for the institute to be expanded to take on all the Criminal Sciences Research in the Rhineland region, and to combine its expanded research role with operation as a police academy. Those expansion plans were thwarted by financial constraints, however.

His early published work covered criminal justice in the Italian city states during the later medieval period. He then turned to the relationship between criminal justice and psychoanalysis. A laboratory was set up and the institute to accommodate what became a major research project. During the winter semester 1926/27 and again during 1934/35 he served as dean of the Jurisprudence Faculty.

War and the Nazi dictatorship ended in May 1945 with what remained of Germany divided into four occupation zones. Cologne was in the British zone. The military authorities appointed Bohne to a three-man constitutional commission relating to the university. The other commission members were Ottmar Bühler and Hans Carl Nipperday. Following the commission recommendations, the university statutes from 27 May 1919 were now restored.

Between 1949 and 1951 Gotthold Bohne served as University Rector at Cologne in succession to Josef Kroll. He was elected president of the Madrid based "Centre international d'études sur la fausse monnaie", also becoming vice-president of the Cologne-based German Photography Society.

The focus of his work continued to be on criminalistics and criminology, taking an increasingly inter-disciplinary approach that combined ideas from jurisprudence, philosophy, psychology, historiography, sociology and natural sciences. He concerned himself, too, with hereditary aspects. His private interests included music, poetry and visual arts.
