= Horst Schüler-Springorum =

German legal scholar (1928–2015)

- Born: 15 October 1928; Tehran, Persia (now Iran)
- Died: 5 September 2015 (aged 86); Kleinmachnow (Berlin), Germany
- Occupation: Professor of Jurisprudence
- Children: Stefanie Schüler-Springorum (Historian)
- Parent(s): Werner Schüler (1894-1966); Ilse Springorum (1897-1987)

Horst Schüler-Springorum (15 October 1928 - 5 September 2015) was a German professor of jurisprudence. The focus of his work was on criminal justice.

When he died a tribute in the news magazine Der Spiegel asserted that throughout his [adult] life Horst Schüler-Springorum campaigned for prison reform and for an enlightened and intelligent approach to criminal justice. His best known publication, "Kriminalpolitik für Menschen" ("Criminal Justice Policy for Human Beings") appeared in 1991.

== Life ==
Horst Schüler-Springorum, whose father was a German export trader, was born in a village near Tehran and grew up in Berlin. After the end of the Second World War he studied Political Sciences at Baltimore for a year in 1950/51 before returning to West Germany where he studied Jurisprudence at Frankfurt and Marburg. He received his doctorate in International law from Marburg in 1956. An early post qualification job was as an assistant to Ludwig Erhard, at that time still better known as a celebrity-economist than as a politician. He switched his focus to Criminal justice, and in 1967 received his habilitation (academic qualification) from Hamburg University for work on the legal status of detainees and the prison system in transition. The work, which was supervised by Rudolf Sieverts, was subsequently published as a book, and supported reforms to the German penal system which Schüler-Springorum promoted, with some success, during the next couple of decades.

In 1967 Schüler-Springorum took a professorial post at Göttingen University. By the time he left, in 1971, he was being described as Göttingen's "Prisons expert" ("Strafvollzugs-Experte"). 1971 was the year in which he transferred to Hamburg. He moved again in 1975, this time to LMU Munich where he held the teaching chair in Criminology, Youth Justice and Prison matters ("Kriminologie, Jugendstrafrecht und Strafvollzug"). He retired from LMU Munich in 1993, the year of his sixty-fifth birthday, and was succeeded in the professorship by Heinz Schöch. In the summer term of 1996 he took the "Otto von Freising" visiting professorship at the Catholic University of Eichstätt-Ingolstadt.

In parallel with his work as a law professor, Horst Schüler-Springorum engaged in various activities that promoted more directly the ideas set out in his 1969 book "Strafvollzug im Übergang" ("Prison Policy in Transition"), which gained traction internationally and through which Germany's subsequent Rehabilitation as an objective of imprisonment strategy is anchored. His more recent book, "Kriminalpolitik für Menschen" ("Criminal Justice Policy for Human Beings", 1991), moved forward public discussion of decriminalisation more generally. As a Youth lawyer he became involved with the National Association for Youth Courts and Legal Youth Support ("Deutsche Vereinigung für Jugendgerichte und Jugendgerichtshilfen" / DVJJ), serving between 1962 and 1968 as the Association's chief executive, and then as its Chairman till 1986.

== Awards and honours ==
- 1991 Order of Merit of the Federal Republic of Germany

== Family ==
Horst Schüler-Springorum's maternal great grandfather, Carl Bechstein (1826-1900) achieved eminence as one of Germany's leading piano manufacturers. His daughter, Stefanie Schüler-Springorum, has achieved some eminence on her own account as an historian.
