= Eric Isenburger =

German Jewish painter, exiled to the USA

Eric Isenburger (born Erich Jacob Isenburger (German: [ˈeːʁɪç ˈiːzn̩ˌbʊʁɡɐ]), May 17, 1902, Frankfurt; died March 26, 1994, New York) was a German–Jewish artist who lived in France from 1933 and in New York from 1941.

== Life and career ==
=== European period ===
Erich Isenburger was born in Frankfurt am Main on May 17, 1902 as the son of Sally (Salomon) and Olga, née Neumond. Sally was described as an Ökonom (Note: Ökonom: "an archaic term referring to capital management within a family-run company".) working within Isenburger & Co. in Frankfurt, whose partners were Sally and two of his brothers; Olga, a housewife, was the daughter of a horse-trader, two of whose brothers ran a grain-trading firm, K. E. Neumond, that had offices in both Germany and the United States; in 1921 they founded a banking company, but the following year both died as the result of a car accident, whereupon their shares in the companies and various properties passed to Olga. Erich's slightly older brother Herbert was educated to join a Neumond company.

As a pupil of the Pestalozzi-influenced Musterschule Gymnasium für Jungen in Frankfurt from 1909 to 1921, Erich became a keen painter. Despite some reluctance from his parents, he enrolled at the Frankfurt Kunstgewerbeschule (school of applied arts). He also enrolled at Frankfurt University for courses in art history and archaeology. In 1923, while he was a student at the Kunstgewerbeschule, it merged with the Städelschule (art academy), Franz Karl Delavilla became a professor, and Isenburger ended his university studies. Delavilla's own artwork included commercial assignments, which required an ability in a variety of graphic applications as well as stage settings. Isenburger was a student in his graphic arts class, and decades later he described this education as "strict and traditional". He completed his studies at the Kunstgewerbeschule in 1925, after an extensive trip in 1924 to Italy: along the Italian riviera and to Milan, Venice, Florence, and Rome.

Isenburger had intended to stay in Paris for its malerische ('painterly') material; but on learning that visa extensions would be difficult for Germans, instead went in 1925 to Barcelona, staying there until 1927. He stated in the 1980s that he had studied during this time at the Real Academia Catalana de Bellas Artes, but a later search in the school records provided no evidence for this. What is certain is that he had his own studio (on Carrer d'Aulèstia i Pijoan, in the Gràcia quarter). A photograph of a wall within the studio shows twelve paintings: landscapes, nudes, portraits, and still-lifes.

Gregory Hahn and Karolina Hyży note that although one still-life among the twelve was at one time titled Zerfallendes Judentum ('Crumbling Jewish world'), it "shows no Jewish ritual objects"; and indeed "there are at this time [2018] no known works on Jewish themes recorded in the inventories [of Isenburger's works] or in other archival sources", aside from a single, much later, commissioned painting (The Prophet Moses): "Isenburger remained detached from historical, political, and religious themes". Rolf Jessewitsch broadly concurs, and points out that the title Zerfallendes Judentum was not applied by Isenburger himself but instead by the art collector Gerhard Schneider.

In the paintings of this period can be seen "Isenburger's procedure of not entirely covering over deeper layers of paint, but instead deliberately integrating them in new pictorial compositions. At times all motifs will be clearly demarcated next to each other."

In the spring of 1925, Isenburger had happened to meet Jula Elenbogen – then 17 and speaking only Polish and perhaps also Yiddish – who had been sent by her parents in Augustów to stay with relatives in Frankfurt. After his return from Barcelona in spring 1927 the two continued to meet, going on walks together and eventually making journeys to Dresden, Berlin, and Augustów. His mother (Note: Erich's father had died in 1922.) and family were opposed to marriage with Jula, who was not yet of marriageable age; her parents had met him before Jula had, but plans for a large wedding in Augustów were abandoned when her father suddenly died. They had a small wedding ceremony in Warsaw on December 1, 1927. Jula took classes in dance given by teachers as prominent as Gertrud Kraus, the dances were photographed by Martin Imboden and others, and "a wealth of new relationships opened up in this way".

Still disapproving of the marriage, Erich's mother reduced his allowance. As the cost of living was lower in Vienna, in 1928, the couple moved there, renting a studio apartment, first on Spittelauer Platz, and later on Weihburggasse, above the restaurant Zum Weissen Rauchfangkehrer, then popular among artists (broadly defined). During this period, Isenburger painted numerous portraits of such people, but many have since been lost. While Jula embarked on her career in dance, he worked as a freelance commercial artist and stage designer for a Jewish theater group, Vilna Truppe ('Vilnius Troupe'), when it, directed by Alex Stein, made guest appearances in Vienna in 1930.

Isenburger was short of money, as the theater was not paying him. His departure from the position of stage designer was already decided in October 1930 when his mother killed herself in Frankfurt. This resulted in the expectation of a considerable inheritance for each of her sons, but it was the estate of Erich's father that financed a move to Berlin, then a center for the arts. (Note: Jessewitsch is more circumspect: "An inheritance possibly allowed Erich Isenburger to have a studio built in Berlin....") The couple had the architect Joseph Munio Neufeld transform an apartment at Paulsbornerstraße 77 in Berlin-Halensee into "a sleek, modernist, all-birch studio and apartment"; Neufeld later said that "all of it was furnished by the leading shops and craftsmen of Berlin". The redecoration process would in 1931 have made it hard to use the apartment for its intended purposes, so the Isenburgers traveled to Italy. Their new home was habitable by spring 1932.

Jessewitsch describes Isenburger's techniques of the time:

[O]utlines are scratched into the painting surface ... [I]n 1931 Isenburger painted thin, glaze-like colour surfaces layered one above the other – first colours, then black on top – and then wiped away enough of the black to allow the colours below to shine forth.

He notes that Isenburger's techniques of the period had also been used by Max Ernst, Xaver Fuhr, and Oscar Kokoschka.

The gallery owner Wolfgang Gurlitt noticed Isenburger's participation in at least one joint exhibition in 1932 and was greatly impressed, asking to see more of his work. In January 1933, Isenburger had seven or more works exhibited at the Gurlitt's Berlin gallery. Although it was not a solo exhibition, Isenburger's works eclipsed those by other artists, which were shown "in the gallery's lesser spaces". His own were enthusiastically reviewed by Max Osborn, and others. Osborn remarked on the way that paint was subjected to scratches down to the canvas; another review compared these works to frescoes; a little earlier, Curt Glaser had compared them to mezzotints. Loving the music of Cab Calloway and Duke Ellington, and fascinated by the jazz dances of Josephine Baker, Isenburger placed paintings of dark-skinned dancers at the center of the works he exhibited. The exhibition "rocketed Isenburger to short-lived stardom"; "[t]his was Isenburger's break-through to a stellar career – and at the same time its end".

Not only did Gurlitt stage this exhibition, he also arranged to make Isenburger a monthly payment that would enable himself to have first-purchase rights to his work, got Isenburger to look for emerging artists that he, Gurlitt, might also exhibit, and appointed him managing editor of the annual Das graphische Jahr.

Isenburger painted numerous portraits while living in Berlin. Although most have been lost, a portrait of Gurlitt survives; it:

is remarkable on account of Isenburger's application of thin, glaze-like paint surfaces one on top of the other, for which reason a face can be discerned in a deeper layer of paint under Gurlitt's hands. Motifs of this kind are clearly to be seen in other paintings later on as well. In this Isenburger developed an approach to painting that was uniquely his own.

But after the Reichstag fire and a defamatory review of Isenburger's "degenerate, Jewish art" by the painter and SA Sturmbannführer Otto Andreas Schreiber in the National Socialist German Students' League newspaper Der deutsche Student, Gurlitt advised the Isenburgers to leave Germany and go to Paris for the time being; as he was on good terms with the French consul in Berlin (who had come to see the exhibition), Gurlitt was able to procure the needed travel papers very quickly.

The couple fled by train to Paris on March 31, 1933. In early April, armed men (Note: These resembled members of the Gestapo, which was founded later in April. Decades later, both Gurlitt and Isenburger described them as Gestapo; officials handling claims for restitution cited this anachronism for doubting the accounts' veracity.) raided the gallery and robbed it of all the works of Isenburger that they could find. With hindsight, Gurlitt blamed not only the most politically extreme Nazis but also artists with Nazi tendencies who resented Isenburger's success.

The Isenburgers were based in Paris for about four years. Erich participated in the eleventh Salon des Tuileries; writing for Le Temps, François Thiébault-Sisson criticized the use of color in one work, but praised the artist. Isenburger made a surreptitious one-day visit to Berlin on October 1, 1933, in order to retrieve some possessions (a plan abandoned as too dangerous), to establish a new address on Till-Wardenburg-Str (a genuine address, but one at which his residence was a fiction) in the hope that this would continue to allow money transfers, and to consult with Gurlitt.

One of Isenburger's paintings was exhibited in the 1933 Salon des Tuileries; and, thanks to the Comité français pour la Protection des Intellectuels juifs persécutés, two in the Salon d'Automne later the same year. (Note: The thirty German Jewish artists exhibited in the Salon d'Automne 1933 included Edith Auerbach, Eugenie Fuchs, Peter Lipman-Wulf, Käthe Münzer, Wolfgang Schülein, and Gert Wollheim.) The catalog for the latter gave the exhibitors' addresses; Isenburger's (46 Place Jules-Ferry) was the same as that of Gert Wollheim and Tatjana Barbakoff, and Peter Lipman-Wulf was living in number 44. Writing in Beaux-arts, (Note: Hahn and Hyży cite Raymond Cogniat and Philippe Diolé, "Le Salon d'Automne", Beaux-arts, no. 44 (November 1933), p. 11.) the critics Raymond Cogniat and Philippe Diolé were dismissive about all the exhibitors other than Isenburger, whose work they praised. Writing in Prager Presse, Paul Westheim singled out Wollheim, Wolfgang Schülein, Lipman-Wulf, and Isenburger, "who knew how to create his own signature style, a very striking light-dark of the surface, [and] has been experiencing what one calls a success in the press". (Note: Hahn and Hyży here translate Paul Westheim, "Ausstellung vertriebener deutscher Künstler in Paris", Prager Presse, November 17, 1933.)

In June 1934, Isenburger participated in the émigré exhibition – Exhibition of German-Jewish Artists' Work: Sculpture, Painting, Architecture, sponsored by the Jewish Refugees Committee and curated by Carl Braunschweig (Charles Brunswick) – at Parsons Galleries in London. Isenburger exhibited three works; Franz Landsberger, wrote that these, and especially Lady Sitting, "have something phosphorescent about them, a mysterious effect that is augmented all the more by the incised lines". (Note: Hahn and Hyży here translate Franz Landsberger, "Ausstellung deutscher-jüdischer Künstler in London", Jüdische Rundschau, vol. 47, June 12, 1934.) A short notice in The Manchester Guardian noted "the lively surrealistic eccentricities of Erich Isenburger and Yankel Adler". Helen Rosenau wrote of Isenburger's remarkable color palette.

In Paris, in summer 1933, the Isenburgers met and became friends with the Swedish dance and portrait photographer Anna Riwkin-Brick, who, with her brother Josef Riwkin, would arrange for an exhibition in Stockholm's Galerie Moderne. Running from late December 1934 into January, this was Isenburger's first ever solo show, most of whose exhibits came from Berlin. It brought mixed reviews, but Gregory Hahn and Karolina Hyży single out a perceptive and appreciative review by Gustaf Näsström as "[standing] out from all the rest". Two years later, Isenburger's second exhibition there was of paintings made in France. Judisk Krönika published a particularly appreciative review. (Note: Hahn and Hyży infer that this, signed "H.H.", was by Hans Weil, who had been a schoolmate of Isenburger's at the Musterschule and was now living in Sweden.)

While in France "the couple more or less managed to sustain themselves": Eric by group exhibitions, Jula by dancing. They were much photographed by Riwkin-Brick. By this time Isenburger was using only four pigments: red, Prussian blue, Indian yellow, and black. This lasted until he was settled in the United States, and it intrigued Henri Matisse. In many of his paintings "The paint is applied very thinly, with several transparent layers on top of each other and details ... engraved into the surface as though into a printing plate." In 1935, Isenburger is first known to have designed costumes, sometimes in collaboration with the Swedish artist Ise Morssing.

The Isenburgers moved from Stockholm to Nice in summer 1937. Erich had managed to procure a three-year French visa, but not a work permit, making it very hard to earn an income – and the duration of the visa was suddenly cut by two years. He asked Hans Weil, Anna Riwkin-Brick, and her brother Aminodow Riwkin to attempt to sell his works that were left in Stockholm, where storage was expensive and from where delivery to France would be prohibitively so. His French visa and carte d'identité both expired and his passport was suspended because of non-payment of inheritance taxes. He planned for a March 1938 exhibition in London, but had to cancel as he could not afford the expense either of his own travel (for which he anyway lacked the necessary documents) or of shipping works there from Stockholm. However, during 1938 he had small exhibitions in Nice, one at the Carroll Carstairs Gallery in New York, and participated in one at Stockholm's Galerie Moderne. (Note: However: "Exhibition of seven works in the Carroll Carstairs Gallery probable, details unverifiable.") At some time in the late 1930s, Isenburger met Pierre Bonnard in Le Cannet. He also met Matisse, admired the work of Édouard Vuillard, and was influenced by Paul Cézanne to change his technique:

[Isenburger] created surfaces in the image by means of slightly impasto, evenly covering applications of paint. Transparent over- or under-painting was no longer possible here, and in this way depth was lost, the scene has a flat appearance.

At some time in 1938 or 1939, the Isenburgers moved west from Nice to Grasse. Thanks to a friend, the sculptor Wolf Demeter, the Isenburgers got to know a well-off Swiss couple named Schurch, who provided plantations that could support people such as the Isenburgers who needed both an income and documents. Erich and the theater director Friedrich Schramm were on March 16, 1939 given shares in Société Le Cyprès; the Isenburgers cultivated peaches, apricots, grapes and jasmine; and the Schurchs also bought some of Erich's works, paying in Swiss francs.

On September 1, Erich learned that, equipped with enough food for a few days and some blankets, he had to report to a camp de rassemblement in Antibes the morning of the next day. He was interned as a German and thus an enemy alien in Fort Carré (Antibes), and soon moved to Les Milles (Aix-en-Provence). On December 30, 1939, Isenburger and Schramm faced a tribunal, in which each showed that they held shares in Société Le Cyprès. Many artists and intellectuals were interned at Les Milles; Isenburger, who had got on well with camp officials (as well as his fellow internees) by giving them pen and ink or pencil drawings of themselves, was released on February 10, 1940 on medical grounds; he returned to Grasse.

However, Isenburger was interned again on May 22, 1940, first at Les Milles and later in an open-air camp at Saint-Nicolas near Nîmes. (Note: These were (Vichy) French. Descriptions of them as German – for example by the unnamed editor of a letter sent in January 1937 by Charlotte Weidler – are mistaken.) (Having lost her Polish citizenship when she married and now having German nationality, Jula was interned in Gurs, west of Pau and close to the Pyrenees.) On August 8 Erich fled from Saint-Nicolas (where Jula had briefly joined him after escaping from Gurs) to the house of his friends Valeriu and Eva Marcu in Nice, where a feigned pulmonary disorder – too grave for a return to Saint-Nicolas – kept him in a private clinic, the expenses met by the Schurchs' payments for his paintings.

Valeriu Marcu ran a campaign, involving letters from André Gide, Matisse, and André Malraux, to have the prefect release Isenburger from internment. The campaign succeeded and he was released. But he and Jula were warned to stay away from Grasse, and therefore moved inconspicuously to the pension "Marie José" in mid-October 1940 – close to the October 18 publication of the Law regarding foreign nationals of the Jewish race (Loi du 4 octobre 1940 relative aux ressortissants étrangers de race juive), which allowed the prefect of a département to intern any Jewish resident. Meanwhile, in New York, Erich's brother and sister-in-law had the Museum of Modern Art's director Alfred H. Barr Jr. and New York Congressman Bruce Barton send letters to the US Consul in Nice; while the Emergency Rescue Committee and HICEM, in New York and Marseille respectively, also worked for the Isenburgers, who in late December were given temporary visitors' visas.

The couple were granted entry permits for the USA but lacked them for Spain. Helped by the Emergency Rescue Committee led by Varian Fry, they fled via Spain to Lisbon, from where they had arranged a passage to the United States on the S.S. Siboney, departing on April 11. They missed this; but Erich's elder brother Herbert paid for a second passage, on S.S. Ciudad de Sevilla, which on May 15 departed for Ellis Island.

=== American period ===
The Isenburgers arrived at Ellis Island on June 3 (and Erich had his name changed to Eric).

Four months later, Isenburger had a solo exhibition at the Knoedler Gallery in New York; this brought many favorable reviews in the New York press, and he could sell ten of the 23 paintings exhibited. This exhibition would be followed by eight more there, the last being in 1955. (Note: Possibly also yet another, in 1962.)

Isenburger's Girl with a Cat appeared in the Museum of Modern Art's show Recent Acquisitions late in 1942. Edward Alden Jewell, the New York Times' art critic, wrote that the painting, "fresh in its handling of decorative rhythms, may be thought to reveal, in a general way, the influence of Matisse." Isenburger seems to have been quickly accepted into New York's art circles, for example appearing with such artists as Chagall and O'Keeffe in an "Artists' Evening" in December 1943. (Note: "The Iranian Institute, 9 East Eighty-ninth Street, will hold an 'Artists' Evening' of informal discussion tomorrow at 8 P. M. Among those who will participate are Marc Chagall, Leon Dabo, Eric Isenburger, Nicolai Cikovsky, Georgia O'Keeffe, Mané-Katz, Arbit Blatas, Ossip Zadkine, James Lechay, Kurt Seligmann, Fernand Leger, Eugene Higgins, Milton Avery, Wallace Putnam and Wanda Gag.")

Jewell described the work that Isenburger exhibited at Knoedler's in 1947:

Retained in full force is the brush-stroke texture that in some mysterious fashion resembles silk or velvet. But the forms that emerge through this strange faintly blurring web are now more firmly defined, and the prevailing color key is quite a bit higher than before.

His expressionism is purely decorative, never "social". This work is decorative in the sense that Matisse's also is, though there the resemblance ends.

Isenburger makes always telling use of accents, with respect both to color and to design. Thus a singingly inventive interior or piece of still-life becomes, in its own right, dramatic.

Both the Isenburgers became U.S. citizens in 1949. (Note: Both certificates of naturalization are reproduced in Von Frankfurt nach New York.)

A New York Times review of a 1953 show at Knoedler's said:

Nature, that is plant forms and flowers, inspire most of Eric Isenburger's new oils and pastels at Knoedler's. This artist has abandoned his furry style of painting for a more or less straightforward account of what strikes his fancy.... Isenburger is a fresh and attractive colorist and the results are vivid. There is, however, an inscrutability to his work, which comes from an inability to order visual facts into an over-all design.

In 1956, Isenburger was admitted as an Associate Member ("ANA") of the National Academy of Design in New York, and was elected a full member a year later.

For some period from 1957 to 1959, Isenburger was a visiting professor of art in Mary Washington College (Fredericksburg, Virginia); and in the second semester of the 1972/1973 academic year, he was a visiting artist there.

In June 1962, Isenburger had another solo exhibition in Munich, in the Wolfgang Gurlitt Gallery.

Between the 1950s and 1980s, he created sketches, drawings, and pastels on numerous trips, especially to southern Europe, which often later served as studies for oil paintings.

Jürgen Kaumkötter contrasts Isenburger's work of 1933 with his work as an American. The former, he says, was innovative, with incised surfaces. But in New York (during the era of Rothko and Pollock), the one time avant-gardiste limited himself to the conventional and safe. Rolf Jessewitsch concurs, writing that in America Isenburger continued the approach to painting that he had adopted in France, ignoring developments in the art world of the 1950s to 1970s, and "[f]or this reason he declined in importance in the last decades of his life".

Isenburger died in New York City in 1994.

The German National Library possesses an archive of thousands of items related to Isenburger.

== Exhibitions ==
This list is selective. (Note: For a 2017 attempt at an exhaustive list, see the chapter on exhibitions within Von Frankfurt nach New York.)

- Erich Isenburger, Fritz Wagner, Gerda von Freimann, Kurt Günther, Robert Stieler, Karl May, Galerie Wolfgang Gurlitt, Berlin. January 8–31, 1933. Seven or more works. (Also, works by five other artists.)
- Exhibition of German-Jewish Artists' Work: Sculpture, Painting, Architecture, Parsons Galleries, London. June 5–22, 1934. Three works (among a total of 221 works). (Note: Sponsored by the Jewish Refugees Committee and curated by Carl Braunschweig (Charles Brunswick), "this precarious London exhibition held in the Oxford Street showrooms of a commercial paint manufacturer ... is rightful claimant to the distinction of having been the first presentation of modern German art in Great Britain".)
- Erich Isenburger. Galerie Moderne, Stockholm. December 29, 1934 – January 13, 1935. 31 works.
- Erich Isenburger. Galerie Moderne, Stockholm. December 19, 1936 – January 7, 1937. 43 works.
- Eric Isenburger. Galerie Milton, Nice. From April 12, 1938 (closing date unknown). 30 works.
- Eric Isenburger. Exhibition of Paintings. Knoedler Gallery, New York City. September 29 – October 18, 1941. 23 works.
- Paintings by Eric Isenburger. McClees Galleries, Philadelphia. March 16–28, 1942. 21 works.
- Exhibitions of Art for the Young Collector: Paintings by Eric Isenburger. Baltimore Museum of Art. November 20 – December 20, 1942. 20 works.
- Recent Acquisitions: Painting and Sculpture. Museum of Modern Art, New York City. September–December 1942.
- Recent Paintings by Eric Isenburger. Knoedler Gallery, New York City. October 4–23, 1943. 26 works.
- Recent Paintings by Eric Isenburger. Knoedler Gallery, New York City. March 5–24, 1945. 21 works.
- European Artists in America. Whitney Museum of American Art, New York City. March 13 – April 11, 1945. Four works.
- Eric Isenburger. De Young Memorial Museum, San Francisco. April 6 – May 9, 1945. 33 works.
- Exhibition of Paintings by Eric Isenburger. Francis Taylor Galleries, Beverly Hills, California. June 5–30, 1945. 28 works.
- Exhibition of Eleven Modern Painters. Parrish Museum of Southampton, Southampton, New York. July 12 – August 5, 1945. Four works.
- Paintings by Eric Isenburger and Sculptures by Henry Rox. Museum of Fine Arts, Springfield, Massachusetts. November 1–30, 1945. 22 works (also, works by Henry Rox).
- Paintings by Eric Isenburger. John Herron Art Institute, Indianapolis. March 12 – April 14, 1946.
- Paintings by Eric Isenburger. Knoedler Gallery, New York City. March 10–29, 1947. 24 works.
- Portraits, Flowers, Interiors, Water Colors. Parrish Museum Southampton, Southampton, New York. July 19 – August 10, 1947. Eight works.
- Eric Isenburger. Exhibition of Paintings. Closson Galleries, Cincinnati, Ohio. Two weeks in February 1948. 20 works.
- Eric Isenburger. Knoedler Gallery, New York City. September 27 – October 16, 1948. 20 works.
- Eric Isenburger. Associated American Artists Galleries, Los Angeles. June 2–22, 1949. 20 works.
- Eric Isenburger. Knoedler Gallery, New York City. November 27 – December 16, 1950. 20 works.
- Eric Isenburger. Knoedler Gallery, New York City. January 5–24, 1953. 21 works.
- Eric Isenburger. Country Gallery, Westbury, New York. June 15 – July 3. 1954. 22 works.
- An Exhibition of Recent Works by Eric Isenburger. Knoedler Gallery, New York City. September 19 – October 8, 1955. 13 works.
- Paintings by Isenburger. Gallery 100, Princeton, New Jersey. October 15 – November 15, 1960.
- An Exhibition of Drawings and Paintings by Eric Isenburger. Scarborough School, Scarborough-on-Hudson, New York. 30 works. March 11–23, 1962.
- Eric Isenburger. New York. Galerie Wolfgang Gurlitt, Munich, June 4–26, 1962.
- Eric Isenburger. Recent Paintings. Hammer Galleries, New York. 18 works. October 2–13, 1962.
- [Title and details unknown]. The Virginia Steele Scott Collection of Art, Knoll House Gallery, Pasadena, California. 1976. Seven works.
- Exhibition and Sale of Paintings by Eric Isenburger. Artistic Ventures Gallery, West Haven, Connecticut. July 1990.
- Eugene Speicher. 1883–1962 / Eric Isenburger. 1902–. Wooster Gallery, New York City. October 5 – November 18, 1990. 12 works (also, works by Speicher).
- Eric Isenburger 1902–1994. Ausgewählte Werke. Städtische Galerie im Rathausfletz, Neuburg an der Donau. May–June 1999.
- Dreams and Nightmares. Montanelli Museum, Prague. March–May 2012. Paintings (also, works by 24 other artists) from the Center for Persecuted Arts.
- Eric und Jula Isenburger. Von Frankfurt nach New York. Museum Giersch, Goethe University, Frankfurt am Main, October 2017 – February 2018. Kunstmuseum Bayreuth. June 10 – October 14, 2018. Accompanied by a catalogue.
- Der Angriff der Gegenwart auf die übrige Zeit. Künstlerische Zeugnisse von Krieg und Repression = The Assault of the Present on the Rest of Time: Artistic Testimonies of War and Repression. Brücke-Museum, Berlin. September 2023 – February 2024. Three works.
- Wolf's Gallery, Cleveland, Ohio.

== Awards ==
This list is selective. (Note: For more awards, see the "Timeline" on the Isenburger website, or a book chapter.)

- Prize of $1,000, 120th annual exhibition of the National Academy of Design, 1945. For the painting Still Life.
- "Painting in the United States, 1947", Carnegie Institute. Third prize ($700). 1947; for the painting Playing the Banjo.
- Medal of honor of the National Academy of Design, late 1940s.
- William A. Clark Award, Corcoran Gold Medal and $2000 (Corcoran Gallery of Art, Washington, D.C.), 1949; for the painting Romantic Figure.
- National Academy of Design: elected an associate, 1956; elected an academician, March 7, 1957.
- Edwin Palmer Memorial Prize (National Academy of Design) and $1500, for Beach through the Window, 1970.

== Collections ==
This list is probably incomplete.

- Pennsylvania Academy of the Fine Arts, Philadelphia
- Baltimore Museum of Art
- De Young Museum, San Francisco
- Museum of Modern Art, New York City (Note: MoMA later disposed of one painting ("sold to benefit its acquisitions program"). As of June 2026 its website shows nothing by Isenburger in its collection.)
- American University Museum, Washington DC (Note: One painting, previously at the Corcoran Gallery of Art, Washington DC.)
- Center for Persecuted Arts, Solingen
- Jewish Museum Frankfurt
- Nationalmuseum, Stockholm
- Museum of Applied Arts, Vienna

== Works cited ==
- Hahn, Gregory; Hyży, Karolina (2024). "Hiding the Works 1933: Eric Isenburger's Salzburg". The Journey of the Paintings: Hitler's cultural politics, art trade and storage during the NS era in the Salzkammergut (PDF). Linz: Lentos Art Museum. pp. 122–128. ("The text is an English translation of the original text 'Versteckte Kunst 1933. Eric Isenburgers Gemälde Salzburg' written in German language for the catalog of the exhibition Die Reise der Bilder ['The Journey of the Paintings'] pp. 271–280. Translation by the authors.")
- Roussel, Hélène (2015). "German-speaking artists in Parisian exile: Their routes to the French capital, activities there, and final flight – a short introduction". In Rotermund-Reynard, Ines (ed.). Echoes of Exile: Moscow Archives and the Arts in Paris 1933–1945. Berlin: Walter de Gruyter. pp. 1–26. ISBN 978-3-11-029058-5.
- Wartenberg, Susanne; Jessewitsch, Rolf, eds. (2017). Von Frankfurt nach New York: Eric und Jula Isenburger [From Frankfurt to New York: Eric und Jula Isenburger]. Petersberg: Michael Imhof. ISBN 978-3-7319-0626-1. (Also ISBN 3-935283-37-7.) Translations by Karl Gerhard Hempel and Edith C. Watts. Published for an exhibition.
  - Großkinsky, Manfred; Jessewitsch, Rolf; von Assel, Marina. "Preface and acknowledgements". In Wartenberg & Jessewitsch (2017), pp. 11–17.
  - Hahn, Gregory; Hyży, Karolina. "Beyond the irretrievable moment: Background notes on Eric and Jula Isenburger". In Wartenberg & Jessewitsch (2017), pp. 18–125.
  - Jessewitsch, Rolf. "A discovery: The painter Eric Isenburger". In Wartenberg & Jessewitsch (2017), pp. 126–141.
  - Wartenberg, Susanne (2017a). "Solo and group exhibitions". In Wartenberg & Jessewitsch (2017), pp. 275–289.
  - Wartenberg, Susanne (2017b). "Awards". In Wartenberg & Jessewitsch (2017), pp. 290–293.
