= Irmgard Schüler =

German-Israeli art historian

Irmgard Schüler (Hebrew: אירמגרד שילר; born July 12, 1907, in Bochum; died after 1962) was a German-Israeli art historian.

== Life ==
Irmgard Schüler was a daughter of the Bochum private banker Oskar Schüler (1879-1929) and Martha Liebhold. Her grandfather Hermann Schüler (1840-1926) came from Balve and founded a bank in Bochum during the Gründerzeit boom in 1872, which was managed solely by his older brother Paul Schüler (1876-1942) after Oskar Schüler's death.

Irmgard Schüler attended the municipal upper secondary school in Bochum and studied art history, archaeology and history in Heidelberg, Munich, Berlin and Bonn from 1927, completing her doctorate in Bonn in 1932 under Paul Clemen with a dissertation on the Master of the Gardens of Love. She found employment at the Suermondt Museum in Aachen, but was dismissed after the Nazis came to power in 1933 because she was Jewish. From 1934 to 1938, she worked as an assistant at the Jewish Museum in Berlin. She also worked as a librarian for the Jewish Community of Berlin. Together with Franz Landsberger, who had taken over the management from Erna Stein-Blumenthal in 1935, and the freelance curator Rahel Wischnitzer-Bernstein, she organized exhibitions and processed the collections despite anti-Semitic persecution. After the Nazi's anti-Jewish Kristallnacht pogrom in 1938, the museum was forced to close.

Schüler managed to emigrate to Palestine with her mother. From 1942, she was employed in the Jewish administration in the Mandate territory and became an administrative official when the state of Israel was founded. After her retirement in 1962, she devoted herself to art history again.

Her uncle Paul Schüler and his wife were murdered in the Holocaust in 1942; their two children were able to emigrate to the USA.

== Writings ==
- Der Meister der Liebesgärten. Ein Beitrag zur frühholländischen Malerei. Amsterdam : Munster, 1932
- Der jüdische Lederschneider Meis Jafe. In: Jüdische Rundschau. 1934, Nr. 78/79
- Das jüdische Museum. Zwanzig Jahre jüdische Kunstschau. In: Israelitisches Familienblatt, 25. Februar 1937, S. 16a
- A note on Jewish gold glasses. In: Journal of glass studies. The Corning Museum of Glass. 8.1966, S. 48–61, ISSN 0075-4250
- Ein unbekannter Stich des Meisters der Liebesgärten. In: Wallraf-Richartz-Jahrbuch, 30.1968, S. 345–348, ISSN 0083-7105
- Jewish gold glasses, early fragments of Jewish art. In: Jewish Art Journal, 1977, 1, S. 28–32, ISSN 0160-208X

== Literature ==
- Schüler, Irmgard, in: Ulrike Wendland: Biographisches Handbuch deutschsprachiger Kunsthistoriker im Exil. Leben und Werk der unter dem Nationalsozialismus verfolgten und vertriebenen Wissenschaftler. München : Saur, 1999, ISBN 3-598-11339-0, S. 626f.

== See also ==
- The Holocaust
- Nazi Germany
- Nuremberg Laws
- Emigration of Jews from Nazi Germany and German-occupied Europe
- Aryanization
