= Lechay =

Lechay is a surname. Notable people with the surname include:

- James Lechay (1907–2001), American painter
- Jo Lechay, Canadian painter

== See also ==
- Lachey, another surname
