= Otto Hirsch =

German and Jewish jurist and politician

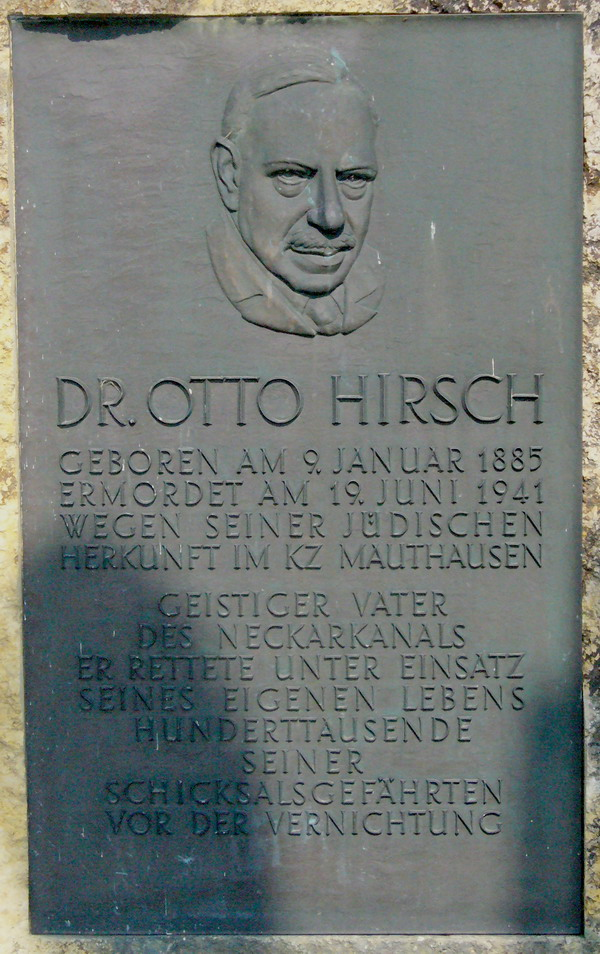
Memorial plaque on the Otto Hirsch Bridge

Otto Hirsch (January 9, 1885 – June 19, 1941) was a German Jewish jurist and politician during the Weimar Republic. He was born in Stuttgart, Germany and died in Mauthausen concentration camp.

== Biographical details ==
In 1930, Hirsch was elected president of the high council of the Jewish Religious Community in Württemberg. After the Machtergreifung when the Nazis seized power, he protested the Nazis' power grab and organized Jewish self-help.

Hirsch was one of the founders of the Reichsvertretung der Deutschen Juden and was named to its board of directors; the president was Leo Baeck. Hirsch moved to Berlin to devote himself to his duties, first taking a leave of absence and later resigning as president of the Württemberg Jewish Community's high council.

He was arrested the first time by the Gestapo in 1935, but was soon released. In 1938, he represented German Jews at the international Évian Conference in France, convened at the initiative of Franklin D. Roosevelt. Returning to Berlin, he continued his protests. Shortly after Kristallnacht, Hirsch was again arrested, this time for protesting the pogrom. He was sent to Sachsenhausen concentration camp for two weeks and was released, after which he devoted himself to helping Jews to emigrate.

In July 1939, the security police named Hirsch, Baeck and others to the board of the newly formed Reichsvereinigung der Juden in Deutschland, with which the Reichsvertretung was forced to merge. On February 16, 1941, Hirsch was again arrested, this time without explanation. On May 23, he was sent to Mauthausen and according to Nazi records, Hirsch died on June 19, 1941. The exact circumstances surrounding his death remain unknown.

At the opening of the Stuttgart port on March 31, 1958, the city of Stuttgart named a bridge after Otto Hirsch. On January 9, 1985, a memorial to Hirsch was unveiled on the bridge. Since 1985, a medal in Hirsch's name is awarded annually by the city, along with a Judaeo-Christian organization and the Jewish Religious Community. The medal is awarded to people who have devoted themselves to cooperative work between Christians and Jews.

== Bibliography ==
- Paul Sauer, Für Recht und Menschenwürde. Lebensbild von Otto Hirsch (1885-1941). Gerlingen 1985
