= Jewish athletics during the 20th century =

During the 20th century, specifically in the Interwar period, athletics became a point of social integration in Jewish communities throughout Europe. Specifically within German society, playing sports provided a chance for Jews to gain social standing and even notoriety for their accomplishments. Additionally, cheering for local area sports teams and clubs provided a common (secular) point of interest between Jews and non-Jews. While there are many instances of social integration and acceptance as a result of sports, antisemitism was common at sporting events in central Europe as well. Discrimination, provocation, and riots occurred at sporting events and in response to Jewish athletes, coaches, and managers. As such, the public perception of Jewish athletics was mixed, with notable examples of fame and antisemitism throughout the 20th century.

== Jews and sports in Germany ==
An example of the success that some Jewish athletes achieved in Germany can be seen through Daniel Prenn, a Russian-born tennis player who competed for the German national tennis team in the 1920s and 1930s. Through Prenn was a Russian citizen, his notable wins for Germany in the Davis Cup helped to bring him the acclaim and recognition that was primarily reserved for non-Jewish athletes in Germany. As a result of his numerous victories, Prenn was featured in an article in the Israelitisches Familienblatt (IF), a German newspaper. While the IF normally relegated articles on sporting events to the secondary sections of the publication, by 1932, sporting articles were often featured with large headlines—and even photographs of Jewish athletes—in primary sections of the newspaper. These changes were unprecedented in the IF, and provided hope that sports could become a path for Jews in Germany to reach social integration and equality.

Additionally, as Jewish athletes such as Daniel Prenn began gaining notoriety for their accomplishments, German publications and spectators became more favorable toward them. In another German publication, Vossische Zeitung, Prenn's success was well documented, with references to German spectators who began to accept Prenn as "Our Prenn" -- "Unser Prenn" in German. This acceptance of Prenn, a Jewish athlete, into German society was a large step forward for the Jewish hope to become equal and contributing members of German society.

== Antisemitism in sports ==
While Daniel Prenn had experienced the acclaim and recognition of success for the German national tennis team in multiple Davis Cup victories, he was not immune to the hate and discrimination that plagued Jews in Germany. After negotiations with a local tennis racquet supplier fell through, Prenn was accused of breaking the laws of amateurism, and was eventually taken to court over the matter. While Prenn was found innocent of these charges, the German Tennis Association still decided to suspend Prenn for a six-month period to resolve the baseless claims. This discrimination against the Jewish Prenn came as a large blow to a younger generation of Jewish athletes in Germany who admired Prenn and his accomplishments. As a result of these allegations and the unnecessary and unwarranted suspension by the German Tennis Association, Prenn ended up leaving the German association in favor of the Jewish sports club, Berlin Bar Kochba.

== Public perception of Jewish athletes ==
Despite the success seen by many Jewish athletes in German sports competitions, hateful and derogatory comments were still common among German spectators. An example of this rabid anti-semitism occurred during a sporting competition in Rostock, Germany which featured many sports clubs, including Berlin Bar Kochba, which was a primarily Jewish club. After Bar Kochba's athletes began winning many of the events at the competition, chants of "Hep Hep" were made throughout the crowd of spectators. These anti-Jewish chants (in reference to the Hep-Hep Riots of 1819) nearly pushed Bar Kochba to withdraw and leave the competition entirely.

Another example of the rampant antisemitism that plagued Jewish athletes across Europe came from the soccer matches played by Hakoah Vienna, a Jewish sports club in Austria. While derogatory comments were present in any soccer match, these same comments turned into antisemitic comments when Hakoah took the pitch. Comments of "Jew pig" or "dirty Jew"—translated from the German "Judensau" and "Drecksjude"—were common for Hakoah players and supporters. These actions against Hakoah Vienna were not limited to hateful comments, but extended into rioting as well. In August 1923, at a match between Hakoah Vienna and Ostmark, the Austrian news publication Wiener Morgenzeitung reported that these riots featured verbal abuse and constant antisemitic threats levied against the "Jewish pigs" of Hakoah. While this publication focused on the riots occurring at that particular match, it made mention of the constant barrage of threats and insults thrown toward Hakoah players and supporters at every match, even at their home field in Krieau.
