= Samson Schames =

German-American visual artist

Fritz Siegfried Samson Schames (December 31, 1898 in Frankfurt am Main – 1967 in New York) was a German-American visual artist.

== Biography ==
Samson Schames came from one of the oldest Jewish families in Frankfurt, Germany. He was a many-faceted artist, who worked as a graphic, set and textile designer and painter. He was trained in the Staedelschule.

Schames began his art studies at the Offenbacher Kunstgewerbeschule, but his studies were interrupted by his conscription for service in the First World War. After the war, he continued his studies at the Frankfurter Kunstgewerbeschule. After 1928 he devoted himself intensively to painting.

After the rise of the Nazis to power in 1933, he was only able to exhibit his works in exhibitions of the Jüdischer Kulturbund or in his own studio. In 1937, at least seven of his works were confiscated from public collections as part of the Nazi campaign against "Degenerate Art" .

Due to the increasing persecution of Jews by the Nazis, Schames left Germany with his wife, Edith, in 1939 and went to London, where he was active in the "Free German League of Culture in Great Britain." In 1948, he moved with Edith to New York, where he died in 1967.

== Works ==
=== Works confiscated from public collections as part of the 1937 campaign against "Degenerate Art" ===
- Landschaft (Watercolor; Kunstsammelstelle Frankfurt; destroyed)
- Florenz (Watercolor; Kunstsammelstelle Frankfurt; vernichtet)
- Straße (Print; Kunstsammelstelle Frankfurt; included in the 1937/1938 propaganda exhibition "The Eternal Jew" in Munich. whereabouts unknown.)
- Rückenakt (Print; Kunstsammelstelle Frankfurt; included in the 1937/1938 propaganda exhibition "The Eternal Jew" in Munich. whereabouts unknown.)
- Landschaft (Print; Kunstsammelstelle Frankfurt; included in the 1937/1938 propaganda exhibition "The Eternal Jew" in Munich. whereabouts unknown.)
- Bärtiger Kopf (Drawing; Kunstsammelstelle Frankfurt; destroyed)
- Sizilianische Küste (Watercolor; Städelsches Kunstinstitut Frankfurt/Main; destroyed)
