= Lachey =

Lachey is a surname. Notable people with the name include:

- Drew Lachey (born 1976), American singer and actor, the brother of Nick Lachey
- Jim Lachey (born 1963), American radio analyst for college football and former National Football League player
- Luke Lachey (born 2001), American football player
- Nick Lachey (born 1973), American singer-songwriter, actor, producer, and television personality
- Vanessa Lachey (born 1980), American television personality and beauty queen

== See also ==
- Lechay, another surname
