= Israelitisches Familienblatt =

Jewish newspaper in Germany

- Type: Weekly newspaper
- Founder(s): Max Lessmann; Leo Lessmann
- Founded: 1898
- Ceased publication: 9–10 November 1938
- Headquarters: Hamburg
- Country: Germany

Israelitisches Familienblatt (literally: Israelite Family Paper; originally: Israelitisches Familienblatt für Hamburg, Altona und Wandsbek) was a Jewish weekly newspaper, directed at Jewish readers of all religious alignments. Max Lessmann and Leo Lessmann founded the Familienblatt, which was published by the printing and publishing house Buchdruckerei und Verlagsanstalt Max Lessmann first in Hamburg (from 1898 to 1935), and then in Berlin (1935–1938). The Familienblatt was the only newspaper dealing with majorly Jewish issues in Germany which was run (at least until 1935) by a private business not aligned to a Jewish organisation of any kind. The editorial and printing offices were located in ABC-Straße 57 in Hamburg. The Hamburg agglomeration, consisting of the Free and Hanseatic City of Hamburg, the Danish-Holsteinian cities of Altona and Wandsbek as well as the Hanoverian city of Harburg upon Elbe, had been an important Jewish centre in Europe and in number with c. 9,000 persons, the biggest in Germany. Only by the first third of the 19th century did Berlin, Prussia's capital, overtake with Jews migrating from the former Polish provinces, which Prussia annexed in the Polish Partitions. Originally directed to readers in Hamburg's metropolitan area the Familienblatt gained more and more readers and spread nationwide in Germany. Israelitisches Familienblatt was prohibited to appear any further after the November Pogroms on 9–10 November 1938.

== History and characteristics ==
Herbert A. Strauss characterised Israelitisches Familienblatt "as the gemütliche, middle-brow journal written for the average petit-bourgeois family in city and country, the Sunday paper that wants to edify, educate and comfort, the Jewish equivalent to the (antisemitic) Gartenlaube." The Lessmanns kept the Familienblatt, politically rather conservative, out of the controversies on assimilation or Zionism, as fought between the Centralverein deutscher Staatsbürger jüdischen Glaubens (literally: Central Association of German Citizens of Jewish Faith, founded in 1893) with its C.V.-Zeitung (founded in 1922) and the Zionistische Vereinigung für Deutschland (founded in 1897 and chaired by Felix Rosenblüth (later Pinchas Rosen) from 1920 to 1923) with its Jüdische Rundschau.

The Familienblatt provided broad-scale information and news about life in the Jewish communities, Jewish celebrities, Jews around the world, Judaism, Jewish traditions and history, recipes for kosher cooking. In its cultural insert the Familienblatt presented music, performing and visual art by examples of creative works by Jewish artists. Esriel Carlebach, since 1931 permanently appointed to the Familienblatt, went to the theatre on four to five evenings each week and afterwards composed his reviews. Over time the Familienblatt spread and specific editions appeared for Hamburg, Berlin, Frankfurt am Main and one Reich's edition for the rest of Germany. In 1933 the circulation amounted to 25,000, which meant that about one-fourth of all Jewish families in Germany had subscribed to the Familienblatt.

Education took up much space in the Familienblatt. Another editorial emphasis was to strengthen Jewish identity and self-confidence by taking a positive attitude to Jewish matters. The Familienblatt covered the establishment of a Jewish museum in Berlin, directed by Karl Schwarz. In 1905, Albert Wolf (1841–1907), a jeweller from Dresden, donated his collection of Jewish art, at that time the biggest of its kind in Germany, to the Jüdische Gemeinde zu Berlin (founded in 1671). The community further enriched the art collection by its own possessions, acquisitions and donations and showed it the first time in 1917 and then with irregular frequency. In November 1929, an association established to found a Jewish museum. On 24 January 1933 Jüdisches Museum zu Berlin (1933–1938), run by the community, opened in Oranienburger Straße 31.

Later confronted with growing antisemitism the Familienblatt worked towards resolving and enlightening as to Jewish matters. Carlebach had unveiled that Joseph Goebbels, who so vehemently defamed Jews and their alleged detrimental influence, had studied with Jewish professors, to whom he owed his scholarship at that time. In the beginning of the 1930s the general atmosphere grew more aggressive. In November 1932 to January 1933 the Familienblatt published a series named 'Sowjetjudäa' (Soviet Judea) on Jewish life under communist reign, a report written by Carlebach on his journey through the USSR in summer 1932. He came to the conclusion that there were neither the possibilities nor an adequate milieu for a genuine Jewish life.

Albert Einstein occasionally brought the Sowjetjudäa series up for discussions, so that they had a much broader response than usual. Especially adversaries of Hitler, who relied on the USSR and who naïvely or willfully downplayed the crimes there, were incited to give thought to his arguments or to be angry with Carlebach. "The articles brought forth a flurry of anonymous threatening letters and a vile pamphlet attack upon him from Hamburg's 'Jewish Workers' Study Group'." The camouflage name of this group (in German: Arbeitsgemeinschaft jüdischer Werktätiger, Hamburg) aimed at disguising the harassing of Carlebach, the avowed Jew, by the Young Communist League of Germany, Hamburg branch.

On the night of 3 January 1933 the harassment culminated in an assassination attempt. A gunshot cut through his hat, barely missing him. Carlebach fell over, got concussed and lost consciousness. The police found him later senseless. Israelitisches Familienblatt offered a reward of 2,000 Reichsmarks for the capture of the person who did it. By February he had recovered so far that he could resume his work for the Familienblatt.

In January 1933, the Familienblatt still assumed that the German citizenry in its majority would refuse antisemitism. On 30 January 1933 Paul von Hindenburg appointed Hitler, only since recently German after his seventh attempt to get naturalised finally succeeded on 25 February 1932, chancellor of a coalition government of right-wing forces. On 2 February, the Familienblatt declared its dismay that an outspoken antisemite was appointed head of government, and expressed its hope that once in office the antisemitic movement of National Socialism would have to come to terms.

After the fire in the Reichstag on 27 February 1933, Hindenburg could be persuaded that this, and not his appointment of Hitler, caused an emergency situation, and that he thus needed to decree the partial suspension of the Reich's constitution, which he did by the Reichstag Fire Decree. The Nazis in the Reich's government, with Hermann Göring holding simultaneously the Reich's and Prussian ministry of the interior, could command executive forces of Prussia's police. Thus the Nazis could start to arrest political opponents. Also Carlebach, the Familienblatt's editor, was arrested. He attributed his arrest to Goebbels, who resented Carlebach for unveiling facts from the times, when Goebbels was still studying.

Carlebach was lucky, since the prison guards had not yet been brought into dictatorial line and still clung to constitutional practices. He was released from custody because no judicial warrant existed. Just out of prison, Carlebach had to go into hiding, for the Nazis meanwhile noticed that he had been released, and started to search for him. He found aides, who provided him with a hideout and forged papers and smuggled him out into Poland.

The last genuine election under Nazi rule on 5 March 1933 was heavily influenced by the Nazi party. All elected communists and many elected social democrats and liberals were arrested or hiding, so that the number of Nazi-opponent members of the Reichstag, able to attend the decisive sessions of parliament, was sufficiently reduced in order to create a parliamentary majority for the Nazi party, which it could not gain in the election itself. A law, the Enabling Act of 1933, was passed (only opposed by the few unarrested social democrats who risked attending the session) that empowered the Reich's government to rule without parliamentary legislation. Violent atrocities accompanied the Boycott of Jewish shops on 1 April 1933. On 7 April the Reich's government decreed the Law for the Restoration of the Professional Civil Service, which allowed to cleanse the public service from all unwelcome persons, such as liberals, social democrats, communists and persons of Jewish descent.

This law became the first official expression of the Nazi definition of Jewishness. The Nazis did not bother about halachic definitions and the individual creed of the concerned persons. The Nazis declared Jewishness in their view being a matter of inheritance, thus persons were discriminated against as Jews if they had three or four grandparents who were registered after their birth as members of a Jewish congregation. This was easy to detect, because mostly religious bodies were busy with the recording of births, marriages and deaths, before official recording became obligatory in 1875. Thus it happened that Gentiles, completely unaware of their Jewish descent, suddenly figured out that the Nazi government regarded them as Jews. The cleansing wasn't restricted to the public service only, but included also the withdrawal of public permissions or approvals for lawyers, physicians and professors.

In view of this development the Familienblatt aimed at new objectives. The paper now sought to collect Jewish Germans, converted by the Nazi government into a community of fate, to build up support for the new Reichsvertretung der Deutschen Juden (Reich's Deputation of German Jews seated in Berlin), the umbrella organisation established on 17 September 1933, which for the first time ever united all the quarrelling Jewish organisations and religious bodies on a nationwide range. The Reichsvertretung helped Jewish Germans to organise self-help, established central welfare organisations, occupational retraining for dismissed officials, preparation for emigration, built up schools and institution of elementary to higher education open for Jewish students and pupils. The Familienblatt promoted these activities, searched for employers still employing Jewish Germans, gave hints and tips to cope with discriminations and restrictions, reported on opportunities to emigrate.

Especially emigration was difficult, not only because after the Great Depression many countries restricted immigration, but because in 1931 the German government had introduced the Reichsfluchtsteuer, a tax at prohibitive tariffs against capital outflow. This tax made many German and foreign investors very hesitant to withdraw their capital from Germany. But in 1932 the Reichsfluchtsteuer did not really shy away German and foreign investors from withdrawing their capital from the country any more, so that the German government banned free marketing in foreign exchange in late 1932. From then on every sale and purchase of foreign exchange was subject to government approval. A great release was then the Haʿavarah Agreement initiated by Arlosoroff, which enabled about 50,000 Jewish German investors to withdraw capital at all, if they emigrated to Palestine, even though under the very costly prerogatives of the Reichsfluchtsteuer. The Familienblatt informed its readers about this little loophole in the German entrenchment against capital flight. Until 1935 the Familienblatt could increase its circulation to 36,500.

=== Move to Berlin in 1935 ===
In 1935, the Buchdruckerei und Verlagsanstalt Max Lessmann rented from Alfred Japha two stores in his business building in Lindenstraße 69 at corner with Jerusalemer Straße in Berlin, not far from today's Jewish Museum Berlin in Lindenstraße 14. From 1 April on, the Familienblatt appeared in Berlin and became the organ of the Reichsvertretung. New inserts were created 'Economy and Law', 'Youth and School', 'German Jew – where to go to!' covering the urgent problems of Jewish Germans under Nazi reign. Also the advertisements, such as 'situations abroad wanted' and 'advertisements for a marriage partner abroad' revealed this situation. After the exclusion of Jewish Germans and Gentile Germans of Jewish descent from participating in almost all organisations and public events, the Familienblatt tried to provide compensation, as tried the Kulturbund Deutscher Juden (Cultural union of German Jews; est. in 1933), which carried out theatrical performances, concerts, operas and lectures all over Germany, exclusively open for Jewish Germans and Gentile Germans of Jewish descent and their eventually Gentile spouses.

In September 1935, the Nazis fixed their definition of Jewishness, which until then had gradually emerged by laws dealing with specific cases, in the so-called Nuremberg Laws, which officially declassed Jewish Germans and Gentile Germans of Jewish descent to second-class state citizens, as opposed to other Germans being Reich's citizens.

Discriminatory laws had gradually impoverished Jewish Germans and Gentile Germans of Jewish descent by prohibiting them the performance of many businesses and professions. The circulation of the Familienblatt dropped to 26,500 in 1938 due to emigration and impoverishment. In 1938 the impoverishment accelerated after the November Pogroms on 9 and 10 November. Special taxes were levied, Jewish Germans and Gentile Germans of Jewish descent had to sell their property at ridiculous prices often never paid out to the vendors. The last edition of Israelitisches Familienblatt appeared on 3 November. The edition of 10 November could not appear anymore.

=== Jüdisches Nachrichtenblatt (1938–1943) ===
On 23 November 1938, the Jüdisches Nachrichtenblatt (Jewish news gazette) appeared the first time. It was an official gazette under Gestapo control, occupied to a large extent with announcing the ever-growing number of antisemitic regulations imposed by the Reich's government in the aftermath of the November Pogroms.

In order not to evoke more unease among non-persecuted Germans with the increasing antisemitic dictates, as secretly reported to the Reich's government the government preferred to limit public awareness of their injustices by announcing them exclusively in the Nachrichtenblatt, not freely available on sale, but by subscription only for Jews. Periodical Nazi secret service surveys on the German public opinion about antisemitic policies had revealed, especially after the November Pogroms, frequent discontent and disgust, more so in urban centres, in western and southern Germany than elsewhere, and the opinion that destroying other people's property, beating people in the streets, and setting synagogues on fire were criminal acts that should not go unpunished.

On 16 December Hans Hinkel, State commissioner for Prussian theatre affairs including the Kulturbund Deutscher Juden, in Goebbels' Propaganda Ministry, declared in front of Dr. Werner Levie (1903–1945), a Dutchman and therefore one of the few available members – not hiding or arrested – of the Kulturbund's executive board, that until the end of December all the still existing 76 Jewish publishing companies were to be shut down or sold to new owners. The few publications that would still be permitted to appear were to be directed by a publishing department to be formed within the Kulturbund.

In January 1939, the Kulturbund's publishing department opened in the offices formerly used by the Zionist Jüdische Rundschau, which had been shut down right after the pogrom, with its former editor, Erich Liepmann, being the manager of publishing department. The Kulturbund managed to save a great deal of the book stocks of the to-be-shut publishing houses from being pulped. Levie reached the concession, that Jewish publishers obliged to liquidate their companies, might export their book stocks on their own until April 1939 – only few succeeded, because the market for German books was narrow, since impoverished German emigrants could not buy but eventually flooded the western markets by selling their last belongings – if the pertaining purchaser would pay in foreign exchange to the Reichsbank, while the respective publisher would be paid in inconvertible Reichsmarks only. The Kulturbund's publishing department bought the remaining book stocks from their old proprietors at a discount of 80–95% of the original price and would only pay, once proceeds from sales abroad or to German or Austrian Jews and Gentiles of Jewish descent would materialise. Also Austria, annexed by Germany in March 1938, was covered by the Kulturbund's publishing department, and mid-January 1939 Levie arranged the production of an Austrian edition of Jüdisches Nachrichtenblatt, because Jewish Austrians and Gentile Austrians of Jewish descent were legally in an even more precarious situation than Jewish Germans and Gentile Germans of Jewish descent, because with Austria's annexation they lost their citizenship and turned stateless, since they were even denied the second-class status of state citizens.

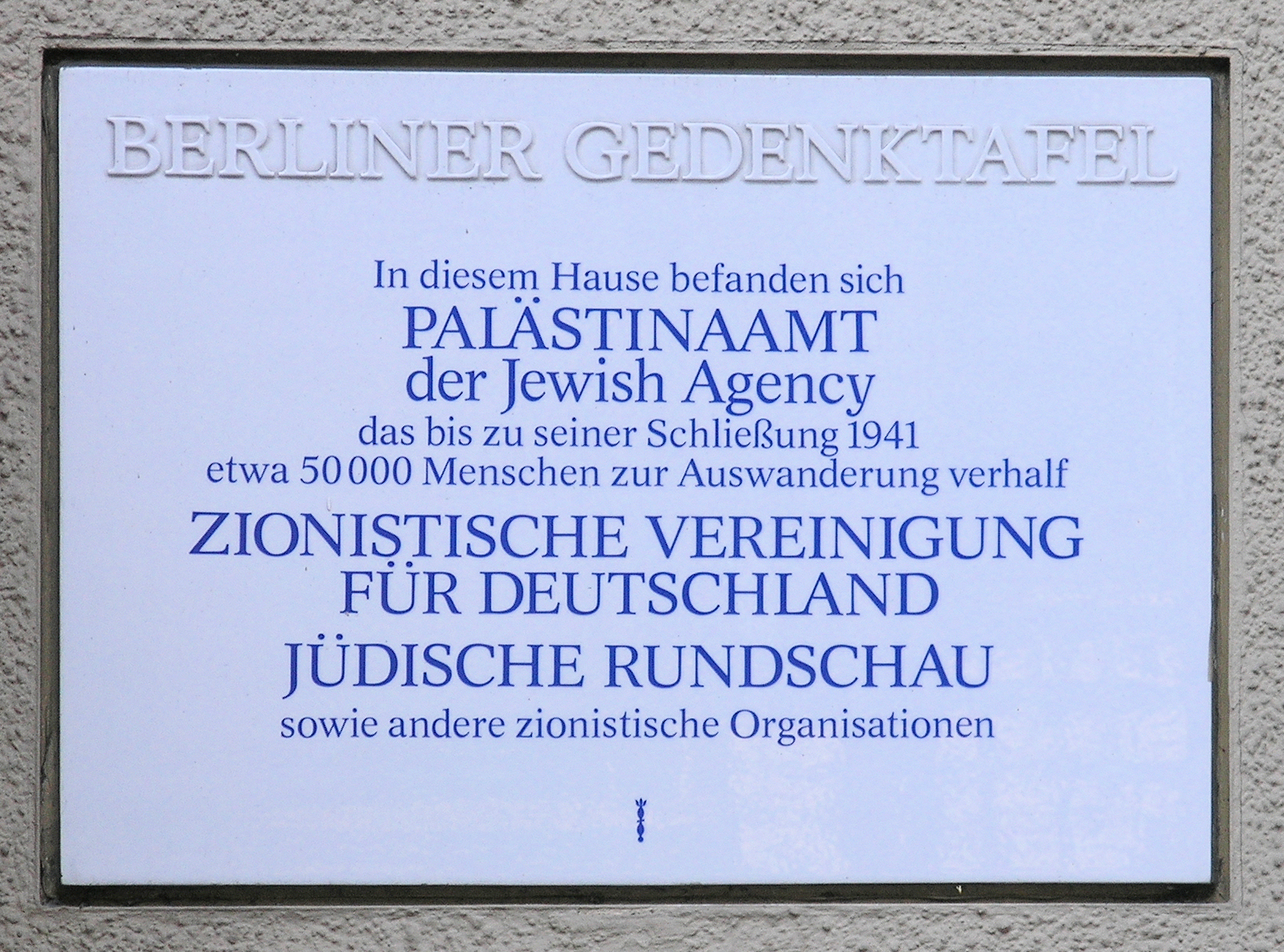
Memorial plaque for Jüdische Rundschau on the façade in Meinekestraße #10.

From January 1939 on the editorial offices of Jüdisches Nachrichtenblatt were located in Meinekestraße 10, Berlin, formerly used by the Jüdische Rundschau. The new paper was restricted to announce public orders and new restrictions and organisational changes as well as to promote emigration. In January 1939 Nova, a company of so-called Aryan owners, bought the Buchdruckerei und Verlagsanstalt Max Lessmann. On 21 March 1939 Alfred Japha, the proprietor, had to sell his house Lindenstraße 69 to the Papiergroßhandlung Ferdinand Flinsch, a paper wholesales company and proprietor of the neighboured house Lindenstraße 70. Also Japha counted as Jew according to the Nuremberg Laws.

The Reich's Propaganda Ministry only allowed the Kulturbund to continue to exist, if it would change its statutes to that effect that the minister (Goebbels) may – at any time – interfere in affairs of the executive board, dissolve the Kulturbund and dispose of its assets. The changed statutes came into effect on 4 March 1939. Levie was appointed executive secretary of the reorganised Kulturbund. Thus the ministry ordered that the Kulturbund's publishing department commissioned the company Nova, using Lessmann's former devices, to print the Jüdisches Nachrichtenblatt.

At the beginning of 1939 being the only organ occupied with matters of interest and information of concern for Jews and Gentiles of Jewish descent in Germany and annexed Austria, the circulation of the German edition reached 62,000 and the Austrian edition 14,000. By mid-1939 the circulation dropped mostly due to emigration by 5,000. And the prohibition to publish advertisements of hauliers and shipping companies of so-called Aryan owners in mid-1939, severed the income situation of the Kulturbund's publishing department. Nevertheless, a surplus remained, which partly covered losses in the cultural department and a considerable sum was transferred to the Central Office for Jewish Emigration, to pay emigration fees levied from lucky receivers of foreign visas, but who were too poor to pay them. Erich Liepmann, the executive manager of the publishing department emigrated to Palestine in summer 1939. The Kulturbund's executive secretary Levie remigrated to the Netherlands at the end of August 1939. He was first succeeded by Johanna Marcus, who soon also emigrated and then by Willy Pless.

In July 1939 the Reich's ministry of the Interior subjected the Reichsvertretung der Deutschen Juden (Reich's deputation of German Jews, renamed in February 1939 in Reichsvereinigung der Juden in Deutschland, Reich's association of Jews in Germany) to its influence and commissioned its subordinate Gestapo with the supervision. The Gestapo appointed by the end of 1939 Adolf Eichmann to chair its Judenreferat in Berlin's Kurfürstenstraße. By this reorganisation the Reichsvereinigung had become a device to better control and discriminate against German and Austrian Jews and Gentiles of Jewish descent. The Nazis counted all Germans and Austrians with three or four grandparents of Jewish community affiliation as Jews according to the Nuremberg Laws and forcibly enrolled them as members of the Reichsvereinigung, regardless if they were Jews according to the Halachah (roughly meaning: Jewish by birth from a Jewess or conversion), apostates, irreligionists or Christians. The members of the Reichsvereinigung's executive board were not elected anymore, but appointed in consent with the Gestapo. The Reichsvereinigung made the Nachrichtenblatt its organ, since all the other 64 papers of Jewish alignment had been forbidden after the November Pogroms.

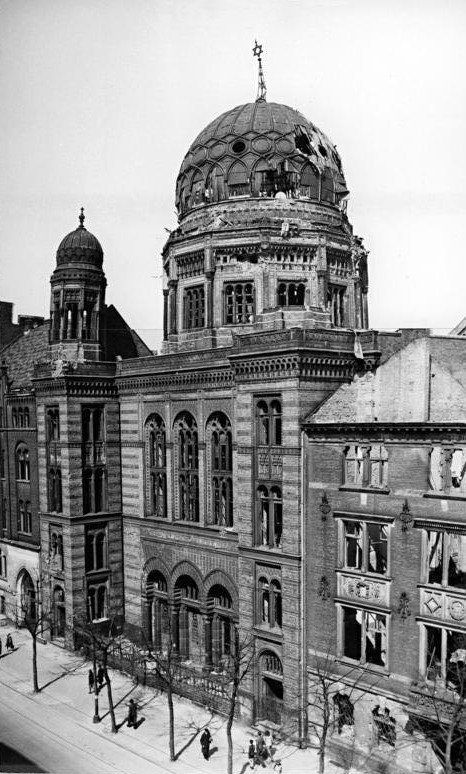
Ruins of Oranienburger Str. #29, last seat of Nachrichtenblatt from January to June 1943, destroyed in an allied air raid on 23 November 1943, left the ruins of the New Synagogue in #30, photo of April 1948

After Germany started the Second World War by invading Poland, the Nachrichtenblatt's two editions per week were both halved in their number of pages. Due to further emigration and impoverishment of the subscribers the circulation had dropped to 35,000 by August 1940. The offices in Meinekestraße had to be evacuated by 31 August 1941. The publishing department moved to Wilsnacker Straße 3 and the editorial offices of the Nachrichtenblatt to Oranienburger Straße 40/41, only to move again and reunite in Oranienburger Straße 29 in January 1943. On 11 September 1941 the Gestapo ordered the Kulturbund's closure, but excepted its publishing department, which was to be taken over by the Reichsvereinigung.

On 18 October 1941 systematic deportations from Germany started. The government agencies, busy with discriminating and persecuting Jewish Germans and Gentile Germans of Jewish descent, learned their lessons from public unease with the open terror in the November Pogroms. After the decision to murder all Jews and Gentiles of Jewish descent was taken, the involved government agencies were worried – whether well-founded or not – about the acceptance of murdering Jews and Gentiles of Jewish descent. In the Wannsee Conference they prepared, among others, huge logistical efforts to transport the deportees over long distances to the East, instead of killing them by mobile squads – as practised in the occupied East –, wherever they would find them. In the East in German-occupied Poland and Lithuania, where the local population was anyway subject to open terror and public executions. The Holocaust was then carried out, far away from most eyes and ears of the general German and Western European public.

The Nachrichtenblatt's chief editor Leo Kreindler died in a Gestapo interrogation in 1942. The Nachrichtenblatt ceased to appear in June 1943, when the Gestapo ordered the Reichsvereinigung's dissolution. The only Jewish organisations, which then continued, were the few hospitals such as the Jüdisches Krankenhaus zu Berlin and the Israelitisches Krankenhaus Hamburg, mostly taking care of Jewish Germans and Gentile Germans of Jewish descent, who were not deported due to a so-called mixed marriage with a so-called Aryan spouse. From the religious point of view, many of these couples were not mixed, because in many cases one spouse had converted to the other's faith.

== Editors and contributors ==
- Dr. Esriel Carlebach (1929–1933, first free-lance, from 1931 on under a permanent appointment)
- Moses Max Deutschländer (first chief editor from 1898 on)
- Rabbi Dr. Berthold Einstein, Landau
- Dr. Ludwig Freund
- Sally Großhut
- J. Guggenheim, Mannheim
- Leo Kreindler (1925–1938 with Familienblatt; 1938–1942 with Nachrichtenblatt)
- Dr. Alfred Kupferberg (pseudonym: Nechuschtan, 1933–1936)
- Julian Lehmann (until 1938)
- Senta Meyer
- Dr. Hubert Plack, Berlin
- Rabbi Hermann Schreiber, Berlin
- Dr. Martha Wertheimer (1890 – 1942), Frankfurt/Berlin
- Rabbi Dr. Georg Wilde, Magdeburg
- Hermann Zucker, Berlin

== Bibliography ==
- Geschlossene Vorstellung: Der Jüdische Kulturbund in Deutschland 1933–1941, Akademie der Künste (ed.), Berlin: Edition Hentrich, 1992, ISBN 3-89468-024-5
- Margaret Edelheim-Muehsam, "The Jewish Press in Germany", in: Leo Baeck Institute Year Book; vol. I (1956), pp. 163–176.
- David Flinker, The Jewish Press that was. Accounts, Evaluations and Memories of Jewish Papers in pre-Holocaust Europe, Tel Aviv-Yafo: World Federation of Jewish Journalists, 1980.
- Herbert Freeden, Die jüdische Presse im Dritten Reich: eine Veröffentlichung des Leo-Baeck-Institutes, Frankfurt am Main: Jüdischer Verlag bei Athenäum, 1987, 203 pp., ISBN 3-610-00401-0
- Maren Krüger, „Das »Israelitische Familienblatt« und die Nova-Druckerei“, in: Juden in Kreuzberg: Fundstücke, Fragmente, Erinnerungen …, Berliner Geschichtswerkstatt e.V. (ed.), Berlin: Edition Hentrich, pp. 363–370. ISBN 3-89468-002-4
- Martje Postma, „Das Israelitische Familienblatt“, in: Vierhundert Jahre Juden in Hamburg: eine Ausstellung des Museums für Hamburgische Geschichte vom 8. November 1991 bis 29. März 1992, Ulrich Bauche (ed.), Hamburg: Dölling und Galitz Verlag, 1991, (= Die Geschichte der Juden in Hamburg; vol. 1), p. 417, ISBN 3-926174-31-5
- Helga Krohn: "A Contest as an Attempt to Revive Jewish Tradition", Insa Kummer (trl.), in: Key Documents of German-Jewish History, 22 March 2017. doi:10.23691/jgo:article-177.en.v1
