= Reichsvertretung der Deutschen Juden =

Jewish advocacy group in Germany (1933-1943)

The Reich Representation of German Jews (German: Reichsvertretung der Deutschen Juden) was a Jewish umbrella organization founded in Germany on 17 September 1933. It was established to coordinate and represent the activities of Jewish political and religious groups, with headquarters in Berlin, and provide legal defence in the face of growing persecution of the Nazi era. The organization was constantly being reorganized and remained active in communities nationwide until after the Holocaust. It ceased to exist in June 1943. The Berlin Rabbi Leo Baeck was elected president of the Reichsvertretung with Otto Hirsch acting as its chairman.

== Mission ==
The Reichsvertretung provided administrative know-how for Jewish Germans to organize self-help. It established central welfare organizations, occupational retraining for dismissed officials (fired in accordance with the Law for the Restoration of the Professional Civil Service, passed 7 April 1933), preparation for emigration, built up schools and institution of elementary to higher education open for Jewish students and pupils. Thus the Reichsvertretung could develop – at least to some extent – a response to the Racial policy of Nazi Germany.

With the passing of the Nuremberg Laws in 1935, the Reichsvertretung was forced to rename itself as Reichsvertretung der Juden in Deutschland (Reich's Deputation of the Jews in Germany). In the same year Israelitisches Familienblatt, newly relocated to Berlin, became the press organ of the Reichsvertretung. After the November Pogrom in 1938 the Reichsvertretung had to rename into Reichsverband der Juden in Deutschland (English: Reich's Federation of the Jews in Germany), now adopting also many administrative tasks, which especially many of the smaller and impoverished Jewish congregations, reduced in their personnel by the arrests and emigrations, could not maintain any more. In February 1939, this organisation assumed the name Reichsvereinigung der Juden in Deutschland (English: Reich's Association of the Jews in Germany). This is to be distinguished from the new Reichsvereinigung der Juden in Deutschland, which emerged in July 1939, when the Reichssicherheitshauptamt subjected the old Reichsvereinigung, representing Jewish interests at a Reich's level, into a subordinate branch – using the same name and more or less the same personnel – of the state administration. This was then in charge of announcing the ever-growing number of anti-Semitic discriminations to its members, and supervising their obedience. In June 1943, the Reichssicherheitshauptamt forcibly dissolved the new Reichsvereinigung.
