= Paul Schüler =

German-Jewish banker and art collector who was murdered in the Holocaust

Paul Schüler (1876-1942) was a German Jewish banker and art collector murdered in the Holocaust.

== Early years and family ==
Paul Schüler (January 21, 1876- 1942 (Retroactively declared dead on 31.12.1945.) was born into a German Jewish family in Bochum. His father was the banker Hermann Schüler. His brother was Oskar Schüler (d. 1929). In 1905, probably shortly after his marriage to Chlothilde Lazard (born October 8, 1880, in Saarbrücken), Paul Schüler moved out of his parents' house in Saarbrücken and built a new house at Kanalstraße 62.

== Banking ==
Schüler owned Bankhaus Hermann Schüler, jointly with his brother Oskar Schüler, until his death in 1929, after which he became the sole owner (until 1932) Bankhaus Hermann Schüler was hit hard by the financial crisis in 1931 and ceased business operations in 1932 with bankruptcy.

== Art collection ==
Schüler owned an important collection of paintings by contemporary artists, including art that was considered degenerate art by the Nazis. Schüler owned Picasso's 1903 blue period painting The Tragedy (Die Armen). Until recently, art historians misspelled his name as "Schubert" based on faulty information from the art dealer Paul Rosenberg. The painting is currently at the National Gallery of Art in Washington D.C.

Schüler's art collection was part of the bankruptcy estate and, much of it was sold by 1939. The remnant of the collection that remained in the possession of the family was sold piece by piece under Nazi pressure or looted by the German police. The whereabouts of most of the collection are unknown.

== Nazi-era persecution, deportation and death ==
When the Nazis came to power in Germany in 1933, Schüler was persecuted because of his Jewish heritage. His trading license was revoked in 1938. Paul Schüler and his wife Clothilde were deported from Gelsenkirchen-Dortmund to the Riga ghetto. They were retroactively declared dead by the Bochum district court on 31.12.1945.(27.01.1942)

His niece, Irmgard Schüler (1907- after 1962), the daughter of his brother, survived the war and became a German-Israeli art historian.
