= The Tragedy (Picasso) =

1903 oil on panel painting by Pablo Picasso

- Artist: Pablo Picasso
- Year: 1903
- Medium: Oil on panel
- Movement: Picasso's Blue Period
- Dimensions: 105.3 cm × 69 cm (41.5 in × 27 in)
- Location: National Gallery of Art, Washington D.C.

The Tragedy, also known as Poor People by the Sea (French: Des pauvres au bord de la mer), is an oil on panel painting made in 1903 by Pablo Picasso. It is currently in Washington, DC, in the National Gallery of Art.

== Description ==
A painting from Picasso's Blue Period (1901-1904), the painting depicts a family of poor people by the sea. The three figures are rendered in an almost monochrome palette in different shades of blue. The three figures, barefoot and cold, allude to the Holy Family and reflect a sense of melancholy and closure in their silent despair.

Nevertheless, the individuals stand out for their majestic dignity. In particular, the austere figure of the mother portrayed from behind references the firm volumetric rendering of the anatomical modeling of the bodies of some Giottesque figures. Despite the use of the almost monochrome palette, Picasso manages to clearly separate the three constituent elements of the universe: water (the sea), air (the sky) and earth (the beach).

== Exhibition and ownership history ==
The painting was exhibited for the first time in 1912 in Cologne, Germany at the Internationale Kunstausstellung des Sonderbundes Westdeutscher Kunstfreunde und Künstler zu Cöln, Städtische Ausstellungshalle, no. 210, as Die Armen am Meer. According to the National Gallery of Art it was previously owned by Alfred Flechtheim [1878-1937], Düsseldorf, Professor Kreis, Düsseldorf, Paul Schüler [1876-1942] Bochum, Germany, Paul P. Rosenberg et Cie., Paris, and Chester Dale [1883-1962], New York, who bequeathed it to the NGA.

== Bibliography ==
- Gillo Dorfles (2016). Capire l'arte 3. Dal Neoclassicismo a oggi. Atlas. p. 200. ISBN 978-88-26-81420-9.
- Giorgio Cricco (2021). Itinerario nell'arte 3. Zanichelli Editore. p. 213. ISBN 978-88-08-34199-0.
