= Jüdischer Kulturbund =

Voluntary association

Jüdischer Kulturbund, or (with the definite article) Der Jüdische Kulturbund, was a cultural federation of German Jews established in 1933. It hired over 1,300 men and 700 women artists, musicians, and actors fired from German institutions. According to Jonathan C. Friedman, it grew to approximately 70,000 members, while Saul Friedländer tallies its roster as high as 180,000.

== History ==
=== 1933–1937 ===
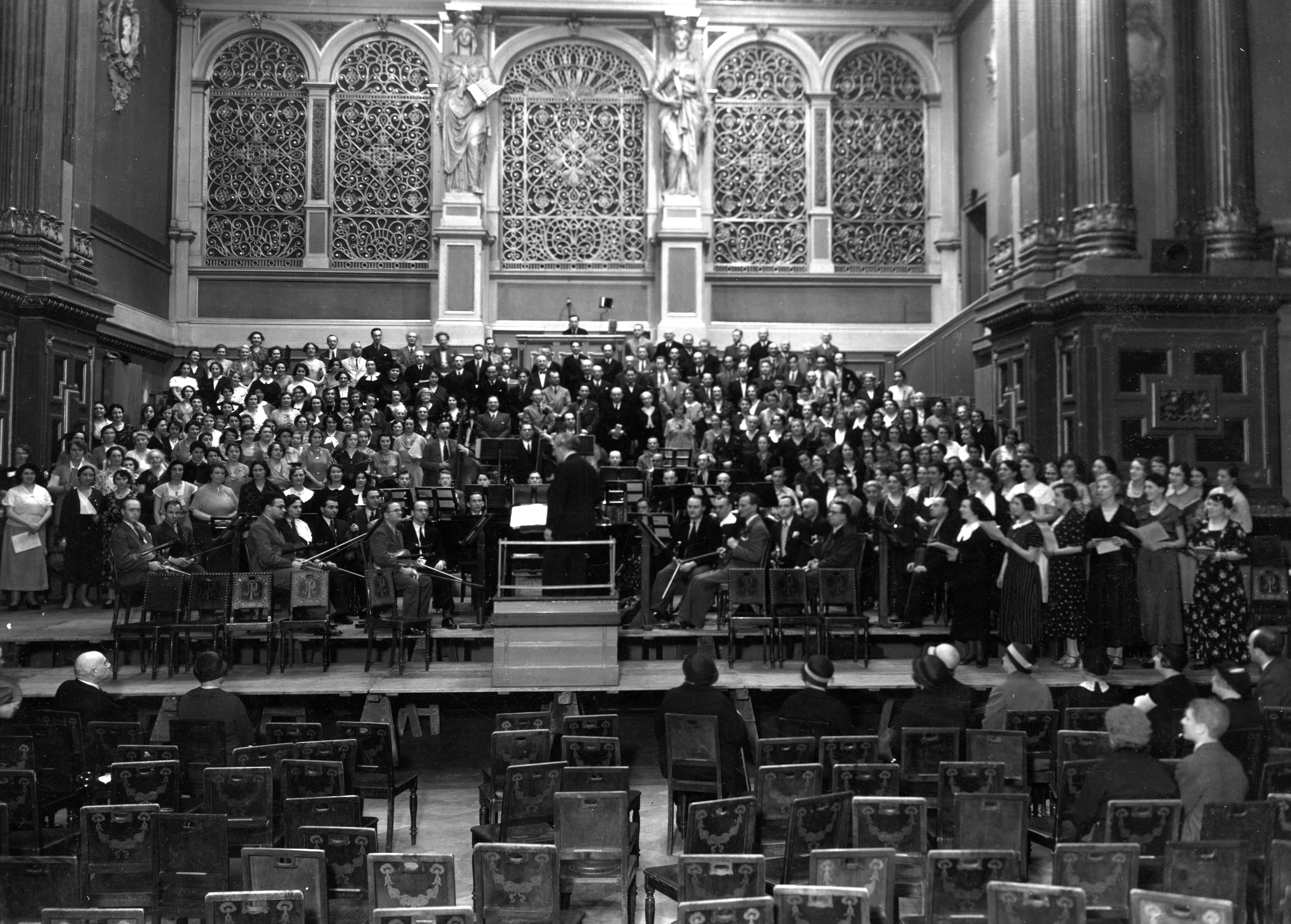
The Kulturbund Deutscher Juden orchestra with conductor Kurt Singer rehearsing for a performance of Handel's Judas Maccabaeus in May 1934

Founded by Kurt Singer, the organization was originally named Kulturbund Deutscher Juden (Cultural Federation of German Jews) in 1933, but in April 1935 the Nazi authorities – forcing the organization to delete the term German from the name – imposed a change of the name into Jüdischer Kulturbund (Jewish Cultural Federation). The Nazi authorities objected to "German" in the organization's prior name. Also known as the Kubu, the Kulturbund was an institution created by unemployed Jewish performers with the consent of the Nazis for the Jewish population. The Kulturbund was one of the most famous examples of Jewish creativity in response to cultural exclusion. It provided a semblance of leisure for its 70,000 members in forty-nine different locals.

In June 1933, Kurt Singer sent a detailed proposal for the Kulturbund to police and various high-ranking officials within the Ministry of Propaganda. The original proposal stated that the organization would employ only Jewish artists and staff, consist of one theatre troupe and one opera ensemble of approximately 15 members each, a choir of 12 singers, and a chamber orchestra of 25 musicians. The proposal also detailed Singer's repertoire plan, costs, organizational structure, advertising plan, and technical and personnel issues. Hans Hinkel, the newly appointed State Commissioner in the Prussian Ministry of Culture at the time, initially rejected the idea for the organization. Singer engaged in persistent negotiations with Hinkel, culminating in a face-to-face meeting in which Hinkel agreed to approve the organization under the conditions that the Kulturbund programming engaged only Jews and occurred in closed quarters.

The Kulturbund became the center of a debate within Berlin's Jewish community when Singer began to advertise the organization to the public. Zionist journalists wrote about the importance of the theatre to include Jewish nationalist themes in its repertoire and serve as a political outlet for the Jewish population. However, Singer strongly believed that the Kulturbund should remain above politics and focus on art creation and performance. The artists of the Kulturbund grew up as Germans and viewed the organization as a place of work and economic advantage rather than a place to further their Jewishness. In its early development, the Kulturbund battled with choosing repertoire, facing censorship from the Nazi government as well as differing ideological opinions within the local Jewish community. From the perspective of the Nazi authorities, tolerating the Kulturbund provided support for the pretense of Nazi respect for "Völkisch" (a term originally meaning "national", adopted by the Nazis in a usage with ethnic and racial connotations) and Zionist Jews as a separate people.

In 1933, the Vocal Music Union (Gesangsverein) began excluding Jews. Jews were excluded from theater performance in 1934. Nazi authorities purged Jews from the Reich Chamber of Culture (Reichskulturkammer) in mid-1935. In September 1935, the race laws deprived Jews of their citizenship and political rights. After the exclusion of Jewish Germans and gentile Germans of Jewish descent from participating in almost all organizations and public events, the Kulturbund Deutscher Juden tried to provide some compensation, as tried Israelitisches Familienblatt.

From 1933 to 1937, the Kulturbund put on theatrical performances, concerts, exhibitions, operas and lectures all over Germany, performed by Jewish entertainers, artists, writers, and scientists who were no longer permitted by the Nazi Party regime to appear before non-Jewish audiences. Thus, Jewish performers could again earn their livelihood, however scarce. The performances took place at authorized segregated venues with "Jewish only" attendance, meaning Jewish Germans and gentile Germans of Jewish descent.

=== 1938–1941 ===
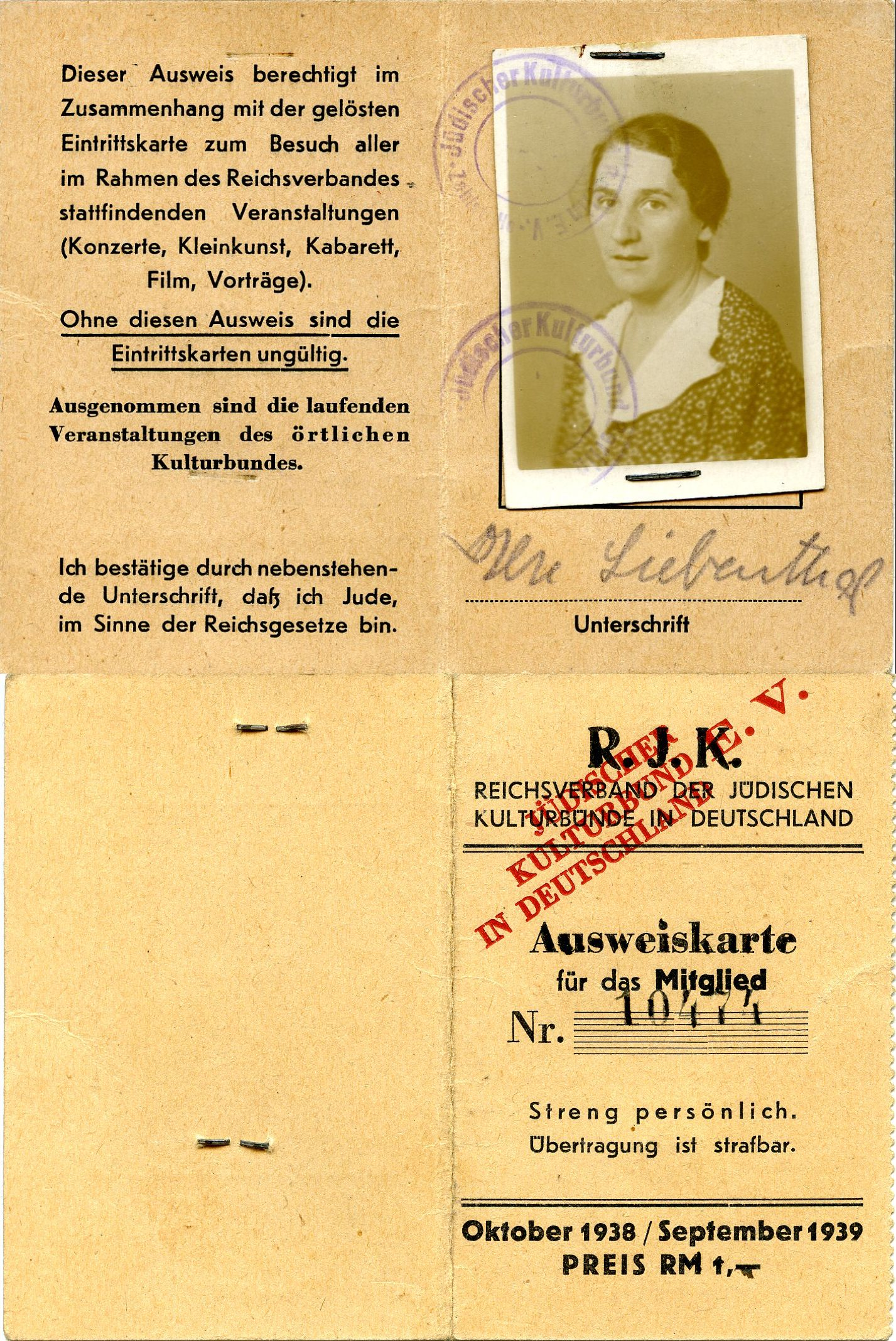
Jüdischer Kulturbund - Ilse Liebenthal's member ID card (1938-9)

Following the Kristallnacht pogroms on November 9/10, 1938, the Kulturbund was allowed to continue its activities; however, the discrimination and persecution of Jews had driven many into impoverishment. The number of venues and of ensemble members was reduced.

On December 16 Hans Hinkel, State commissioner for Prussian theatre affairs including the Kulturbund, in Goebbels' Reich's Propaganda Ministry, declared in front of Dr. Werner Levie (1903–1945), a Dutchman and therefore one of the few available members – not in hiding or arrested – of Kulturbund's executive board, that until the end of December all the still existing 76 Jewish German publishing companies were to be shut down or sold to so-called Aryan owners. The few publications, which would still be permitted to appear, were to be directed by a publishing department to be formed within Kulturbund. In January 1939 the Kulturbund's publishing department opened in the offices formerly used by the Zionist Jüdische Rundschau, which had been shut down right after the Pogrom, with its former editor, Erich Liepmann, being the manager of the publishing department. The Kulturbund managed to save a great deal of the book stocks of the to-be-ceased publishing houses from being pulped. Levie reached the concession, that Jewish publishers obliged to liquidate their companies, might export their book stocks on their own until April 1939 if the respective purchasers would pay in foreign exchange to the Reichsbank. However, the publishers would be paid in inconvertible Reichsmarks only.

The Kulturbund's publishing department bought the remaining book stocks from their old proprietors at a discount of 80% to 95% of the original price and would only pay, once proceeds from sales abroad or to German or Austrian Jews and gentiles of Jewish descent would materialise. Also Austria, annexed by Germany in March 1938, was covered by the Kulturbund's publishing department.

In November 1938, the Propaganda Ministry ordered the Kulturbund to close its theater.

The Propaganda Ministry only allowed the Kulturbund to continue to exist, if it would change its statutes to the effect that the minister (Goebbels) may – at any time – interfere in affairs of the executive board, even dissolve the Kulturbund and dispose of its assets. The changed statutes came into effect on 4 March 1939.

The Kulturbund's executive secretary Levie remigrated to the Netherlands at the end of August 1939. He was first succeeded by Johanna Marcus, who soon also emigrated and then by Willy Pless. The Kulturbund's performing activities nonetheless were embraced by the Jewish population who previously were barred from all cultural and entertainment events.

In 1939, Nazi authorities required the Kulturbund Berlin to take over all local Kulturbund bodies. The Kulturbund then changed its name to the Jüdischer Kulturbund in Deutschland.

On September 11, 1941, the Gestapo ordered the closure of the Kulturbund, but excepted its publishing department, which was to be taken over by the Reichsvereinigung der Juden in Deutschland.

== Fields of activity ==
Kulturbund activities included theater, opera, concerts, and lectures.

=== Publishing ===
The Kulturbund's publishing department sold books from its stock to Jewish Germans and Austrians and thus created a surplus, which partly covered losses in the performing department. A considerable sum was transferred to the Central Office for Jewish Emigration, to pay emigration fees levied on lucky receivers of foreign visas, who, however, were too poor to pay them.

=== Music ===
The conductor Joseph Rosenstock led the opera department. The first opera was The Marriage of Figaro, 14 November 1933. Its last musical performance occurred for a Verdi Night before it was shut down in 1941.

=== Theater ===
The inaugural performance was of Gotthold Ephraim Lessing's Nathan the Wise on 1 October 1933 at the Berliner Theater on Charlottenstraße. Director Karl Loewenberg ends the play differently than Lessing's explicit stage directions, which direct the Jewish Nathan (played by actor Kurt Katsch), the Muslim Sultan Saladin, and the Christian Templar (played by Ernest Lenart) to embrace and exit festively together. Instead, Loewenberg leaves Nathan alone and isolated on the stage, with a pulpit and menorah visible.
