= Erna Stein-Blumenthal =

Erna Stein-Blummethal
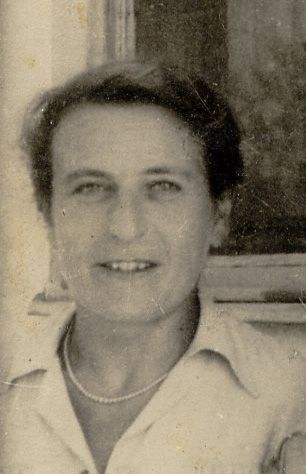
- Born: September 23, 1903; Emden
- Died: June 5, 1983 (aged 79); Emek Chefer
- Education: University of Breslau
- Occupation: Art curator at Jewish Museum (Berlin)
- Years active: 1933-1939

Erna Stein-Blumenthal (September 23, 1903, in Emden, Germany – June 5, 1983, in Emek Chefer, Israel) was a German-Israeli art curator at the Jewish Museum in Berlin starting in May 1933.

== Education ==
She had gone to the University of Breslau in Silesia and studied art history. She then got a doctorate for a dissertation in baroque columns.

== Works ==
Before she was an art curator, she had written articles for the General Lexicon of Fine Arts from Antiquity to the Present and had written a piece for the first volume of the Real Lexicon on German Art History which came out in 1937. In 1930 Blumenthal started working as an assistant of Karl Schwarz, who was creating a collection for the Berlin Jewish community by opening the Jewish Museum on January 24, 1933. Shortly after Adolf Hitler became Reich Chancellor, Schwarz received an offer to establish the Tel Aviv Museum of Art, so he assigned Blumenthal to run and direct the Jewish Museum in May 1933.

== Exhibition ==
Stein-Blumenthal's only recorded exhibition, Führer durch das jüdische Museum (Guide to the Jewish Museum), described relics, paintings, and sculptures made at the time.
