= Ise Morssing =

Swedish visual artist

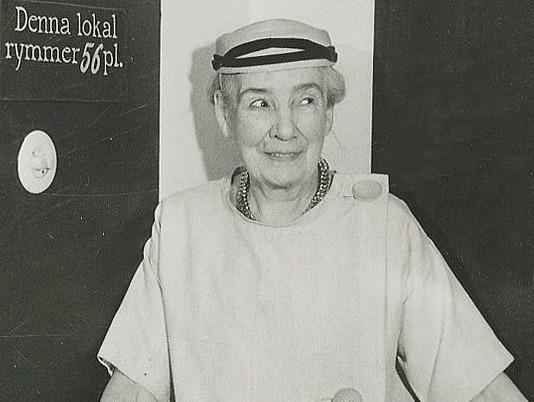
Ise Morssing (1960)

Louise "Ise" Morssing (1878–1969) was a Swedish visual artist, sculptor, scenographer and theater director.

== Biography ==
Morssing was born in Östersund to major J. G. Lilliesköld and Marie-Louise Didron. She studied at the Royal Swedish Academy of Fine Arts in Stockholm between 1901 and 1904 and then traveled to Denmark, Germany, Austria, France and England. In 1904, she married the architect Gunnar Morssing, the part-owner of the architectural firm Höög & Morssing that designed about 140 buildings in the Stockholm area.

Ise Morssing worked within several different fields in the visual arts including sculpture, landscapes paintings in watercolour and oil paint. She sculptured portraits and created with decorative reliefs for several buildings, some designed by her husband Gunnar Morssing. Among her work is the 1912 entré to Karlavägen 11 with several wooden sculptures and a decorative magpie for the upper floor of the building.

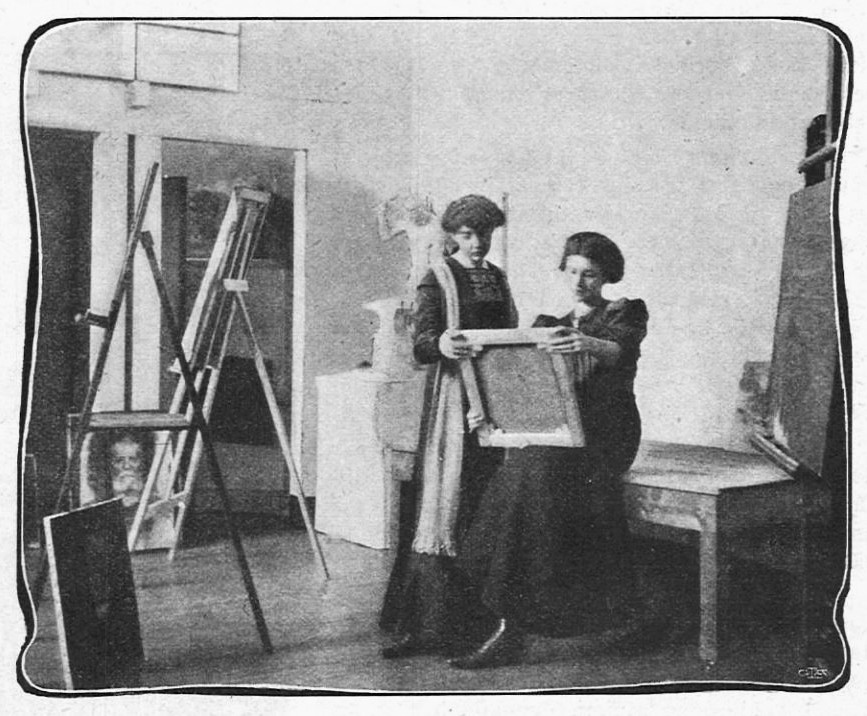
Ise Morssing (standing) and Martha Rydell at her studio at Strandvägen 3, 1907.

Morssing had her own studio in Paris where she created stage costumes, including costumes for the artist Birgit Åkesson. In Stockholm she had her studio on the top floor of Strandvägen 3 where she along with a friend ran a croqui school. In 1953, she started the Marsyasteatern at Österlånggatan 13 in Gamla stan.

Morssing died in Stockholm.
