= Jewish Hospital in Hamburg =

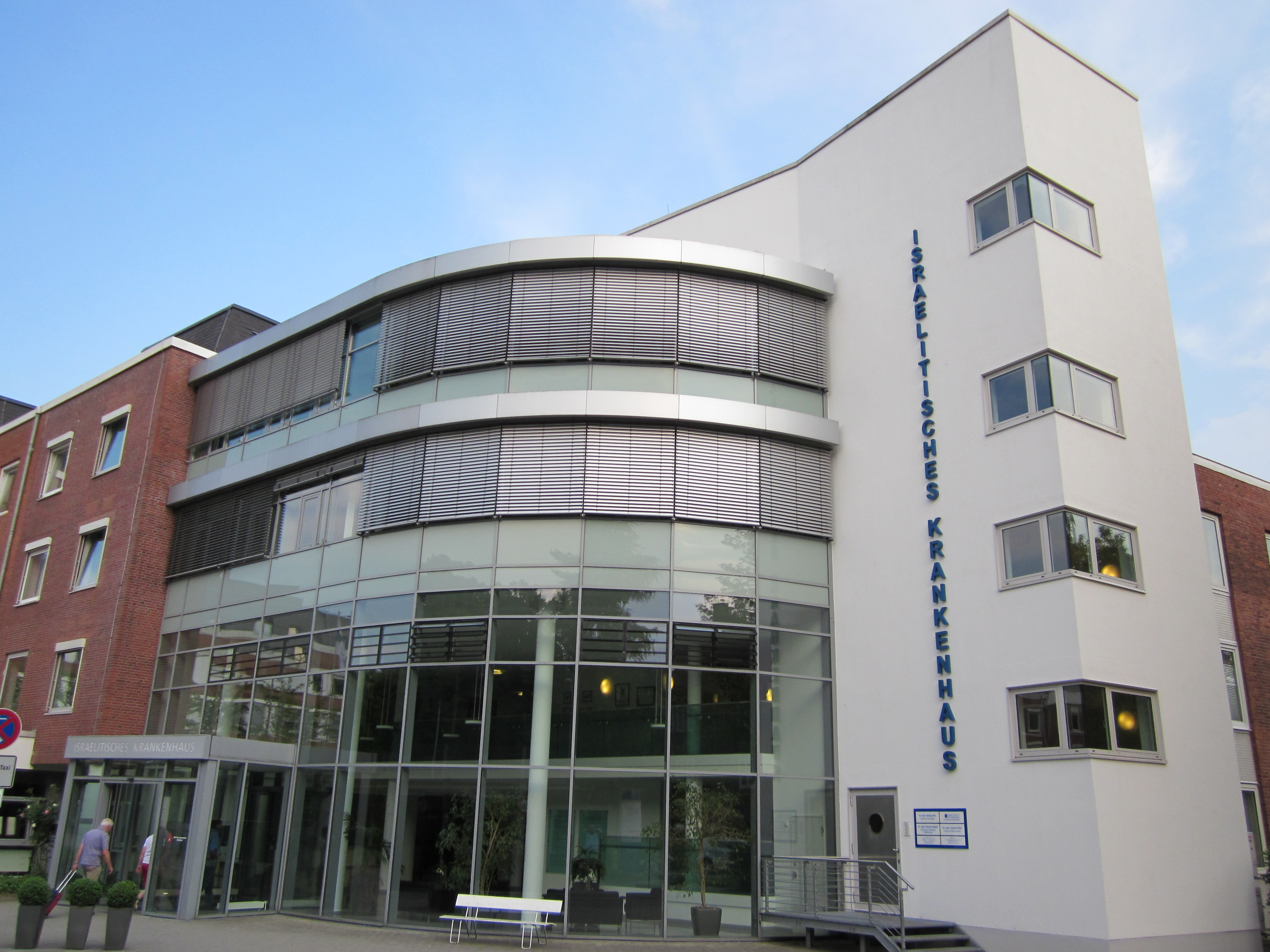

Geography
- Location: Hamburg, Germany
- Coordinates: 53.6058°N 9.9904°E

Organisation
- Type: Community

Services
- Beds: 138

History
- Opened: 17 June 1843

Links
- Website: www.ik-h.de
- Lists: Hospitals in Germany

The Jewish Hospital in Hamburg (German: Israelitisches Krankenhaus Hamburg) is a Jewish medical institution in Hamburg, Germany. It is particularly renowned for its treatment of gastric and bowel cancer.

== History ==
The Israelite Hospital of Hamburg opened in 1843. The city council donated land in the St. Pauli suburb, and building costs were entirely funded by Salomon Heine, a local Jewish banker. He made two stipulations regarding his 80,000 Mark donation: The hospital was to be named for his late wife Betty, who died in 1837; and a Personal lectern should be designated for him in the in-house synagogue.

A poem by Heinrich Heine, the nephew of Salomon Heine, was dedicated to the Hospital following Salomon Heine's death, whose first verse is:

Ein Hospital für arme, kranke Juden,
Für Menschenkinder, welche dreifach elend,
Behaftet mit den bösen drei Gebresten,
Mit Armut, Körperschmerz und Judentume!

A hospital for Jews who’re sick and needy,
For those unhappy threefold sons of sorrow,
Afflicted by the three most dire misfortunes
Of poverty, disease, and Judaism.
(translation by Edgar Alfred Bowring)
