= Franz Landsberger =

German-American art historian

Franz Landsberger (June 14, 1883 – March 17, 1964) was a German-American art historian.

== Family ==
Born into a Jewish family in Katowice in 1883, Landsberger's father, Adolf Landsberger, was a banker and city councillor in Katowice in Upper Silesia. Landsberger passed his school-leaving examination at the Maria-Magdalenen-Gymnasium in Breslau in 1903 (together with the future historian Richard Koebner) and then studied art history, philosophy and literature at the universities of Berlin, Geneva, Munich and Breslau, where he also gained his doctorate in 1907.

== Art scholarship ==
After an extended stay in Italy and travels through Germany, England and France, and after further studies with Heinrich Wölfflin in Berlin, Landsberger habilitated in Breslau in 1912. This marriage produced a daughter. After his habilitation, Landsberger taught as an associate professor at the University of Wroclaw until 1933. Many of his German-language works appeared during this period, which show that he worked in almost all areas of art. Early publications included Wilhelm Tischbein (1908), the St. Gallen Folchart Psalter (1912), Impressionism and Expressionism, already in its 6th edition in 1921, and Vom Wesen der Plastik (1924).

== Nazi era persecution, arrest and exile ==
After his venia legendi was revoked by the National Socialists, he took over the management of the Jewish Museum in Berlin in 1935, assisted by Irmgard Schüler. Landsberger was particularly associated with Max Liebermann, whom he honored with the first memorial exhibition in 1936. In addition to the catalog for this exhibition, he also published a selection of Liebermann's letters in 1937. As director of the Jewish Museum, he was sent to Sachsenhausen concentration camp in 1938, but was able to leave for Oxford after a few weeks as he had received an invitation from the university there. In 1939, he was appointed to the Hebrew Union College in Cincinnati, United States. From then on, he devoted all his energy to researching Jewish art.

== Postwar ==
With his book History of Jewish Art, published in 1946, and other specialist articles on this subject, he became a recognized authority in this field. After the death of his first wife, he entered into a second marriage in 1946.

Landsberger was friends with the rabbi Leo Baeck, the writer Emil Ludwig, the writer Mechtilde Lichnowsky and, until the last years of his life, with the Jewish painter Ludwig Meidner, who came from Silesia.

Landsberger died in Cincinnati on March 17, 1964, at the age of 80.

== Literature ==
- Thomas Lersch (1982). "Landsberger, Franz". Neue Deutsche Biographie (in German). Vol. 13. Berlin: Duncker & Humblot. pp. 517–518. (full text online).
- Kürschners Deutscher Gelehrten-Kalender, 1931.
- Lotte Pulvermacher: Franz Landsberger. In: Jüdisches Nachrichtenblatt [Ausgabe Berlin]. Nr. 26, 31. März 1939, S. 7.
- Jahresbericht Ostern 1904 des städtischen evangelischen Gymnasiums zu St. Maria-Magdalena, Breslau.
- Ulrike Wendland: Biographisches Handbuch deutschsprachiger Kunsthistoriker im Exil. Leben und Werk der unter dem Nationalsozialismus verfolgten und vertriebenen Wissenschaftler. Teil 2: L–Z. Saur, München 1999, ISBN 3-598-11339-0, S. 411–416.
- Werner Röder, Herbert A. Strauss (Hrsg.): International Biographical Dictionary of Central European Emigrés 1933–1945. Band 2,2. Saur, München 1983, ISBN 3-598-10089-2, S. 688
- Hermann Simon: Liebermann-Ausstellung im Centrum Judaicum. In: Berlinische Monatsschrift (Luisenstädtischer Bildungsverein). Heft 4, 1997, ISSN 0944-5560, S. 93–96 (luise-berlin.de – Erwähnung).
