= Hans Hinkel =

Nazi Party official and SS-Gruppenführer (1901–1960)

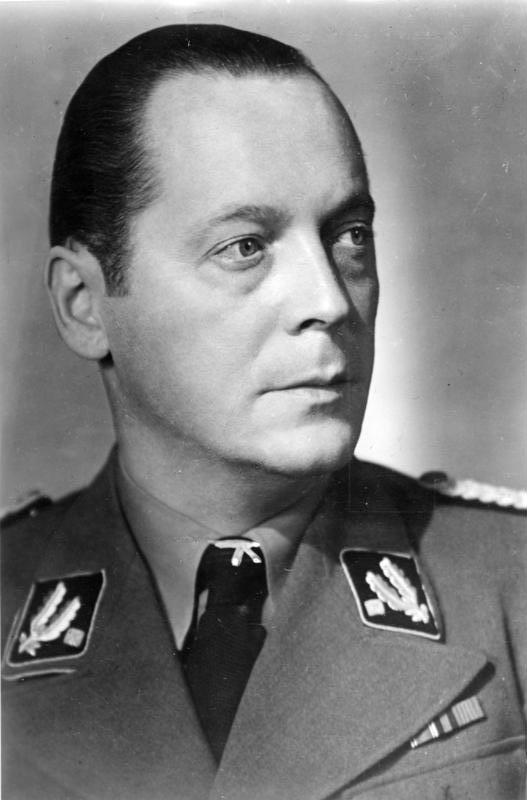
- Hans Hinkel in the uniform of an SS-Brigadefuhrer

Reich Film Superintendent Reich Ministry of Propaganda
- In office April 1944 – 8 May 1945

General Secretary Reich Chamber of Culture
- In office July 1941 – April 1944

Department Head Reich Ministry of Propaganda
- In office April 1938 – July 1941

Reich Cultural Administrator Reich Chamber of Culture
- In office 8 May 1935 – April 1938

State Commissioner Prussian Ministry of Science, Culture and Public Education
- In office January 30, 1933 – 8 May 1935

Personal details
- Born: June 22, 1901 Worms, Grand Duchy of Hesse, German Empire
- Died: February 6, 1960 (aged 58) Göttingen, Lower Saxony, West Germany
- Education: University of Bonn
- Occupation: Journalist
- Awards: War Merit Cross, 1st class without Swords

Johann Heinrich "Hans" Hinkel (22 June 1901 – 8 February 1960) was a journalist, Nazi Party official and politician in Nazi Germany. He mainly worked in the Reich Chamber of Culture and the Reich Ministry of Propaganda. He was involved in executing the policy of excluding Jews from German cultural life, and headed the Ministry's film division. He was also an SS-Gruppenführer, and was imprisoned in Poland for several years after the end of the Second World War.

== Early life ==
Hinkel was born in Worms, the son of a master butcher. After obtaining his Abitur from the Realschule in Worms, he studied political science and philosophy at the University of Bonn from 1919, where he joined the Sugambria Bonn Burschenschaft, a nationalist student association. In 1920 he joined the Freikorps Oberland and, on 4 October 1921, the Nazi Party (membership number 4,686). As an early Party member, he would later be awarded the Golden Party Badge. Also in 1921, he became a member of the Sturmabteilung (SA), the Party's paramilitary organization. After a confrontation with French occupation soldiers, he was expelled from the Rhineland in March 1923 and continued his studies in Munich, but did not complete his degree. In November 1923 he took part in the Beer Hall Putsch and then fled to Lower Bavaria to avoid arrest. As a participant in the failed coup, he would later be decorated with the Party's Blood Order. From June 1924 to November 1926 he was the editor of the Völkische Innwacht in Neuötting.

In September 1926, Hinkel became the business manager of Gau Hesse-Nassau in Kassel. He formally was re-approved for membership in the Party on 20 December 1926 (membership number 48,945), after the ban on it had been lifted. In 1927 he was involved in setting up the Kampfverlag publishing house with the brothers Gregor and Otto Strasser in Berlin and became an editor there. In the 1930 German federal election, he was elected as a deputy of the Reichstag from the Nazi electoral list and he would continue to serve until the fall of the Nazi regime, representing electoral constituency 3 from 1932 onward (Potsdam II, reconfigured as Berlin-East in 1936). That year he also became the press chief for Gau Berlin, working for Gauleiter Joseph Goebbels. There he became editor of the Deutsche Kultur-Wacht and, from 1930 to 1932, editor for the Berlin edition of the Völkischer Beobachter, the main Nazi Party newspaper. He was also active in the völkisch and antisemitic Militant League for German Culture, founded by Nazi ideologue Alfred Rosenberg, and would go one to become its Organisationsleiter (Organizational Leader). Hinkel joined the SS in 1931 (SS number 9,148).

== Career in Nazi Germany ==
Following the Nazi seizure of power on 30 January 1933, Prussian Minister President Hermann Göring appointed Hinkel Staatskommissar (State Commissioner) in the Prussian Ministry of Science, Culture and Public Education under Minister Bernhard Rust, where he was charged with eliminating Jewish participation in German cultural life. Hinkel was soon also give oversight of the Jüdischer Kulturbund (Jewish Culture Federation) which was composed of eight-thousand Jewish artists, musicians, performers and writers. Hinkel set about separating Jewish cultural life from that of the nation as a whole. He banned the Federation from performing plays by German playwrights and music by German composers. This "cultural ghettoization" resulted in the Federation being allowed to produce only Jewish works for Jewish audiences, as non-Jews were not allowed to attend these performances.

On 8 May 1935, Goebbels appointed Hinkel as business manager of the Reich Chamber of Culture and Reichskulturwalter (Reich Cultural Administrator) in the Reich Ministry of Public Enlightenment and Propaganda and, in 1938, he became the department head of the Ministry's Department II.A., the so-called "Jewish Department". In these positions, he continued to be responsible for the displacement of Jewish Germans from the cultural sector, in the process of Aryanization. This culminated in November 1938 when Jews were banned from attending German theaters, cinemas, concerts, lectures, exhibitions and all other cultural events. In 1940, Goebbels was making plans to make Berlin Judenfrei by deporting all 62,000 Jews still living there. Hinkel was involved in this action, reporting that they had already worked out a removal plan with the police and that all could be deported within four weeks of the anticipated end of the war. Hinkel was also given responsibility as Goebbels' Sonderbeauftragter (Special Representative) for cultural personalities, in charge of keeping such individuals under observation. In this capacity, Hinkel was the driving force behind the pressure exerted on the popular theater and film actor Joachim Gottschalk to divorce his Jewish wife. Upon his refusal, she was threatened with being sent to the Theresienstadt Ghetto, and he with the end of his acting career and conscription into the Wehrmacht. This resulted in their joint suicide along with their eight-year-old son on 6 November 1941.

Meanwhile, Hinkel's career continued to advance. In 1939, Göring appointed him a member of the Prussian State Council. In the Propaganda Ministry bureaucracy, he was promoted to Ministerialdirigent in October 1940 and rose to Ministerial Director and Generalsekretär (General Secretary) of the Reich Chamber of Culture in July 1941. As the hardships of the war mounted, Goebbels sought to improve public morale by introducing more entertaining material to German radio broadcasts. In February 1942, he gave Hinkel overall responsibility for artistic and entertainment programming on German radio, to mainly consist of light orchestral music. On 20 April 1943, Hinkel attained his last SS promotion to the rank of SS-Gruppenführer. In April 1944, he took charge of the Ministry's film department and was appointed Reichsfilmintendant (National Film Superintendent). In July, he was also made Vice President of the Reich Chamber of Culture. In his new posts he was charged with continuing the politicization of the film industry and keeping up wartime production of films into the last days of the war. Hinkel also organized test screenings of films before propaganda experts, institutions, and authorities. Since antisemitic film propaganda touched on one of Nazism's core issues, these test screenings served as a way to commit the whole propaganda apparatus to a common, radical line. He also had to ensure that during the final phase of the war more than half of the members of the German film industry fulfilled their duty to serve as soldiers in the Wehrmacht or in the Volkssturm, the Nazi Party militia.

== Post-war life ==
After the defeat of Germany in May 1945, Hinkel was first interned by the Americans in Dachau and then transferred to Poland in 1947 to face charges for his involvement in the theft of Polish cultural treasures. In 1949, a denazification procedure was opened in absentia by the Munich Hauptkammer (Main Chamber) against Hinkel, who was still incarcerated in Mokotów Prison in Warsaw. It resulted in Hinkel being classified as a "main offender" and receiving a sentence of two years imprisonment in a labor camp, taking into account his previous time served. Meanwhile, all of his works, published under the titles Manual of the National Cultural Chamber and Jew Quarter of Europe, were put on the list of proscribed writings in the Soviet zone of occupation. Hinkel was finally able to return from Poland to the Federal Republic of Germany in 1952 where, in a new trial by the Hildesheim denazification tribunal, he was re-classified as a "lesser offender" and he served no prison time in Germany. Hinkel died in Göttingen on 8 February 1960.

== SS ranks ==
SS ranks
Date	Rank
15 September 1935	SS-Sturmbannführer
30 December 1935	SS-Obersturmbannführer
20 April 1936	SS-Standartenführer
30 January 1937	SS-Oberführer
9 November 1940	SS-Brigadeführer
20 April 1943	SS-Gruppenführer

== Sources ==
- Evans, Richard J. (2005). The Third Reich in Power. New York: Penguin Press. ISBN 978-0-143-03790-3.
- Hans Hinkel entry in the Files of the Reich Chancellery
- "Hans Hinkel: Abteilungsleiter im RMVP". Beamte Nazisozialisticher Reichsministerien (in German). 29 March 2019.
- Hull, David Stewart (1973). Film in the Third Reich: Art and Propaganda in Nazi Germany. Simon and Schuster. ISBN 978-0-671-21486-9.
- Klee, Ernst (2007). Das Personenlexikon zum Dritten Reich. Wer war was vor und nach 1945. Frankfurt-am-Main: Fischer-Taschenbuch-Verlag. ISBN 978-3-596-16048-8.
- Lilla, Joachim (2005). Der Preußische Staatsrat 1921–1933: Ein biographisches Handbuch. Düsseldorf: Droste Verlag. ISBN 978-3-770-05271-4.
- Longerich, Peter (2015). Goebbels: A Biography. Vintage. ISBN 978-0-099-52369-7.
- Zentner, Christian; Bedürftig, Friedemann, eds. (1997) [1991]. The Encyclopedia of the Third Reich. New York: Da Capo Press. ISBN 978-0-306-80793-0.
