= James Lechay =

American painter

- Born: July 5, 1907
- Died: August 11, 2001 (aged 94)
- Education: University of Illinois, B.A. 1928; Study for M.A, never graduated
- Known for: Painting
- Style: Abstract Impressionism

James Lechay (July 5, 1907 – August 11, 2001) was an American painter who described himself an "abstract impressionist".

== New York years ==
One of five children born to Russian Jewish immigrants, Lechay grew up in the Bronx and in Joliet, Illinois. He earned a B.A. in psychology from the University of Illinois in 1928 and was a week from completing his M.A. when he quit school to return to New York to study painting with his older brother, the painter Myron Lechay (1891–1972). He rented a studio in a building on 16th Street and Sixth Avenue, where he met Raphael Soyer, Moses Soyer, Mark Rothko, and several other painters who had studios in the same building. Soon he was immersed in the aesthetic, social, and political struggles of New York City's Depression-era art world. In 1934 he married Rose Davidowitz. Their daughter, Jo Lechay, was born in 1936 and a son, Daniel, in 1945.

For a short time in the 1930s, Lechay was a social realist, taking part in exhibitions protesting such injustices as homelessness and racism. Though he soon removed politics from his painting, he remained politically active and became a leader of the Artists Union, an organization of artists employed in the Works Progress Administration (WPA). In 1938 the WPA sent him to Las Vegas, New Mexico, where he organized a gallery and set up exhibitions of work by Milton Avery, Max Weber, and other WPA artists. Back in New York, he was once arrested along with several other artists for demonstrating at WPA headquarters. When the police asked for his name, he answered with "James Picasso". Following suit, the others called themselves after their favorite artists – Manet, Cézanne, Matisse, etc. Ultimately, they were all released, the police never having caught on to the deception.

== Iowa City years ==
In 1945, Lechay came to teach at Iowa at the suggestion of his friend Philip Guston. There he joined a group assembled by art department chairman Lester Longman. The group included Mauricio Lasansky, Humbert Albrizio, Carl Fracassini, and Byron Burford, among others. Lechay remained on the art faculty till 1975, continuing to paint and exhibit his work in Iowa, New York, and around the country.

In 1966 a commissioned portrait of J.W. Maucker, president of the University of Northern Iowa (UNI), brought controversy. When the portrait was unveiled, many at UNI were outraged by its failure to look like a typical portrait of a college president – an abstracted portrait study in shades of blue, brown, and gray. A UNI English professor, Josef Fox, suggested burning it. Controversy raged, and Lechay traveled to UNI to debate the portrait’s merits with Professor Fox before a large audience. His defense of the portrait, and of free expression, won over the crowd and ended the opposition.

While teaching at Iowa, Lechay led summer workshops at various American art schools and at institutions in Hong Kong and Samos, Greece. Many of his students went on to distinguished careers as artists and teachers.

== Wellfleet years ==
In 1959, the builder-architect Hayden Walling, in close consultation with the Lechays, designed and built a summer home and studio for the couple in Wellfleet, MA. These are now considered important examples of domestic Cape Cod Modern architecture. The Lechays moved to Wellfleet year-round in 1972; for the next three decades Lechay showed regularly in New York, Provincetown and Wellfleet, taught privately, and painted daily. Rose Lechay died in 1995, James six years later at the age of 94.

James Lechay was represented in New York by Kraushaar Galleries from 1955 to 2001, and later by the Spanierman Gallery; in Provincetown by Berta Walker Gallery; and in Wellfleet by the Cherry Stone Gallery. As of 2017, much of his work is owned by the Ashley John Gallery in Palm Beach.

== Reception ==
At a time when many of his contemporaries were embracing complete abstraction, James Lechay never abandoned figuration, and retained images and suggestions of: people; cities; seascapes; and various still lives. His imagery was never directly representational or literal, but within its abstraction, the figure remained as a defining characteristic. He maintained that every painting, no matter what the subject, is essentially a self-portrait in that it expresses the inner being of the artist. Though he acknowledged influences as diverse as Giorgio Morandi, Max Beckmann, Milton Avery, and Henri Matisse, he "...realized early on that the richest source of inspiration and challenge was inside his own persona, which brought about pure, process-driven painting, unhampered by the demons of careerism and trendiness".

The University of Iowa Museum of Art owns an extensive collection of Lechay's work. According to the museum’s director, James Leach, "Lechay stands out as one of the most significant American artists of an innovative era who has been insensitively overlooked." The Provincetown painter Megan Hinton has written that "Lechay’s masterful works are simultaneously expressionistic, impressionistic, abstract, minimal, and realistic. He executed a confident and expressive painting approach through his entire career, and left us with an array of work that appears timeless and effortless. According to Hinton, "When I see a really great painting, I see the connection between the confidence that went into making the mark, and how that is portraying a particular image. In Lechay we see that confidence, and that economy of mark-making.”

== Exhibitions and awards ==
=== Solo shows (partial list) ===
- Another Place, New York NY (1936)
- Artists' Gallery, New York NY (1938, 1940)
- Ferargil Galleries, New York NY (1942, 1943)
- Toledo Museum of Art, Toledo OH (1943)
- Kraushaar Galleries, New York NY (1955–2001)
- Macbeth Gallery, New York (1946, 1947, 1950)
- University of Iowa, Iowa City IA, (1951–1972)
- Provincetown Art Association, Provincetown MA (1997)

Others in Trieste, Italy; Dartmouth college; and SUNY Binghamton A retrospective show at the Provincetown Art Association, curated by painter Megan Hinton, opened in July 2017.

=== Group shows ===
- Metropolitan Museum of Art
- Pennsylvania Academy of Fine Arts
- Brooklyn Museum
- Corcoran Gallery
- Whitney Museum
- Smithsonian National Collection of Fine Arts

=== Awards ===
- Norman Wait Harris Medal (1941)
- Art Institute of Chicago (1943)
- American academy of Arts and Letters
- Walker Art Center (1947)
- Childe Hassam Prize (1974)
- Benjamin Altman Prize (1977, 1991)
- Ranger Fund Purchase Prize (1979)
- Edwin Palmer Award (1981)
- Obrig Prize (1992, 1995)

=== Collections ===
- National Museum of American Art (Smithsonian) - 2 works
  - Self-Portrait with Cat (1959)
  - Trapeze Artist (1940)
- Pennsylvania Academy of Fine Arts
- Brooklyn Museum - 1 work
  - New York Dock (1939–40)
- Chicago Art Institute
- National Academy of Design
- Grinnell College
- Skidmore College
- Coe College
- University of Iowa Museum of Art
- University of Arizona
- Syracuse University
- University of Northern Iowa
- Sheldon Museum, University of Nebraska
- Illinois Wesleyan University
- Danforth Museum (Framingham MA)
- Memorial Art Gallery (Rochester NY)
- Hunter Museum of Art (Chattanooga)
- Philbrook Museum (Tulsa)
- Wichita Art Center
- Joslyn Museum (Omaha)
- Memphis Brooks Museum of Art
- Des Moines Art Center
- Figge Museum (Davenport)
- Grout Center (Waterloo)
- MacNider Museum (Mason City)
- Springfield Art Museum
- Westmoreland Museum
- New Britain Institute of Art
- Cape Cod Museum of Art (Dennis)
- St. Mary's College (MD)
