= Jüdische Rundschau =

Jewish periodical in Germany

Jüdische Rundschau (Jewish Review) was a Jewish periodical that was published in Germany between 1902 and 1938. It was the biggest Jewish weekly publication in Germany, and was the origin of the Zionist Federation of Germany.

== History ==
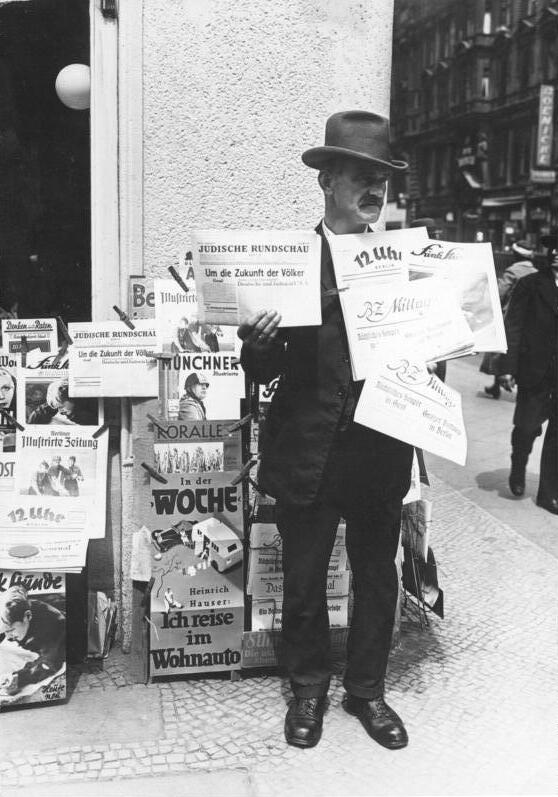
Street seller of Jüdische Rundschau in 1934

The Jüdische Rundschau was published in Berlin from 1902 until it was banned in 1938. As the organ of the Zionist Federation of Germany it represented German Zionism to the outside world. Significant debates about the function and task of Jewish politics in the sense of the Basel program that were held at the first Zionist congress in 1897 were presented on their pages. In addition, from 1933 onwards it reported on the difficult living conditions for Jews in Germany and provided readers willing to emigrate with detailed information on emigration options.

Along with the CV Zeitung and the Israelitisches Familienblatt, it was one of the defining Jewish periodicals in Germany. The magazine emerged from the Berliner Vereinsbote (1895–1901) and the Israelitische Rundschau (1901–1902). It was published by Heinrich Loewe. The editors-in-chief throughout the history of the magazine included Julius Becker, Felix Abraham, Hugo Hermann, Leo Hermann, Fritz Löwenstein, C. Z. Klötzel, Robert Weltsch and Hans Bloch.

The Jüdische Rundschau was initially published weekly from 1902, and mostly twice a week from 1919. After the Reichspogromnacht in 1938, the magazine had to stop its publication. The successor was the Jüdische Welt-Rundschau, which was printed in Paris and from there distributed to 60 countries, until the German Wehrmacht marched in in 1940. It was designed in Jerusalem by numerous emigrated members of the editorial team of the former Jüdische Rundschau and published by Siegmund Kaznelson.

The co-editor Robert Weltsch was one of the most influential and important journalists of the Jüdische Rundschau. His cousin Felix Weltsch, a close friend of Franz Kafka, published the Czechoslovak central organ of the Zionists, the German language Self-Defense (1907–1938), in Prague from 1919.

After mass deportations, massive expansion of concentration camps and manifold forms of discrimination, the last edition of the Jüdische Rundschau appeared on 8 November 1938, one day before Kristallnacht.

=== Circulation ===
- 1926: 10,000
- 1931: 15,000
- 1934: 37,000
- 1935: 37,000
- 1937: 37,000
- 1938: 25,300

== Jüdische Rundschau published by J.B.O. ==
Since the beginning of July 2014, a German-language monthly newspaper has been published under the title Jüdische Rundschau by Jewish Berlin Online (JBO) with an initial circulation of 7,000 prints.

The only thing that it has in common with the historical edition is its name.

The editor of the newspaper is the Berlin entrepreneur Rafael Korenzecher. The Russian-language edition "Jewrejskaja Panorama" is also published by the same house. In the reporting, "conservative, orthodox as well as liberal currents" should be taken into account. One of the objectives of both magazines is to "counteract a media image of Israel that is often distorted and incomplete today".

== Literature ==
- Katrin Diehl: Die jüdische Presse im Dritten Reich: zwischen Selbstbehauptung und Fremdbestimmung. Niemeyer, Tübingen 1997. ISBN 3-484-65117-2. Zugl.: München, Univ., Diss.
- Michael Nagel: Die "Kinder-Rundschau", Beilage der „Jüdischen Rundschau" zwischen 1933 und 1938. In: Michael Nagel (Hrsg.): Zwischen Selbstbehauptung und Verfolgung: deutsch-jüdische Zeitungen und Zeitschriften von der Aufklärung bis zum Nationalsozialismus. Olms, Hildesheim 2002. ISBN 3-487-11627-8, S. 315–350
- Arndt Kremer: „...wir Juden machen jetzt eine ähnliche Bewegung durch wie Deutschland in den Jahren 1770 bis 1870." Das Konzept der sprachbestimmten deutschen Kulturnation und das kulturzionistische Sprachprojekt in der Zeitschrift‚ ‚Jüdische Rundschau'. In: Eleonore Lappin (Hrsg.): Deutsch-jüdische Presse und jüdische Geschichte: Dokumente, Darstellungen, Wechselbeziehungen. Band 1: Identität, Nation, Sprache – jüdische Geschichte und jüdisches Gedächtnis – der Westen im Osten, der Osten im Westen – Konzepte jüdischer Kultur, 2008, S. 319–336. ISBN 9783934686595
- Michael Nagel: Jüdische Rundschau. In: Dan Diner (Hrsg.): Enzyklopädie jüdischer Geschichte und Kultur (EJGK). Band 3: He–Lu. Metzler, Stuttgart/Weimar 2012, ISBN 978-3-476-02503-6, S. 253–255.
- Sabrina Schütz: Die Konstruktion einer hybriden‚ jüdischen Nation'. Deutscher Zionismus im Spiegel der Jüdischen Rundschau 1902 – 1914. Mit 3 Abbildungen (Formen der Erinnerung, Bd. 68). Göttingen 2019. ISBN 978-3-8471-0930-3. Zugl.: Regensburg, Univ., Diss.
- Simon Justus Walter: Kein Sonderweg des deutschen Zionismus. Die arabische Frage in der ‚Jüdischen Rundschau'. Düsseldorf, Univ.-Diss. 2019
