= Reich Association of Jews in Germany =

Jewish umbrella organisation formed in Nazi Germany

The Reich Association of Jews in Germany (German: Reichsvereinigung der Juden in Deutschland, RvD), also called the new one for clear differentiation, was a Jewish umbrella organisation formed in Nazi Germany in February 1939. The Association branched out from the Reich Representation of German Jews (Reichsvertretung der Deutschen Juden) established in September 1933. The new Association was an administrative body concerned predominantly with the coordination and support of the emigration and forcible deportation of Jewish people, subject to the Reich government's ever-changing legislation enforced by the Reich Security Main Office (Reichssicherheitshauptamt or RSHA). The legal status of the new organisation was changed on 4 July 1939 on the basis of the Nuremberg Laws, and defined by the 10th Regulation to the Citizenship Law issued by the Reich's ministry of the Interior. The Association assumed the so-called old Reichsvereinigung der Juden in Deutschland, which was the name under which the Reichsvertretung der Deutschen Juden (Reich's deputation of German Jews) had been operating since February 1939.

The new Reichsvereinigung assumed the staff, installations and buildings of the old Reichsvereinigung. The RSHA subjected the new Reichsvereinigung to its influence and control, and confirmed Rabbi Leo Baeck as president, who had been elected as president of the old Reichsvereinigung. By the end of 1939 the RSHA appointed Adolf Eichmann as its Special Referee for the Affairs of the Jews (German: Sonderreferent für Judenangelegenheiten), officiating in a bureau in Kurfürstenstraße #115–116, Berlin; his department was later known as RSHA Referat IV B4. Eichmann had come to dubious fame for expelling 50,000 Jewish Austrians and Gentile Austrians of Jewish descent within the first three months after the Anschluß. Thus he was commissioned to expel Jewish Germans and Gentile Germans of Jewish descent from within the old Reich borders. The local supervision of the Reichsvereinigung was commissioned to the local Gestapo branches.

== Compulsory membership ==
While its corporate members, such as Jewish congregations and Jewish associations, were gradually dissolved, and their tasks partially incorporated into the new Reichsvereinigung, it also included natural persons. All persons identified as Jews according to the arbitrary Nazi practice (cf. the Nuremberg Laws and the Racial policy of Nazi Germany) were compulsorily enlisted as members. Mainstream Nazi anti-Semitism considered that Jewry formed a group of people bound by close, so-called blood ties, forming a unit which one could neither join nor secede from. Jewish influence was declared to have had a detrimental impact on Germany. To be spared the discrimination and persecutions visited upon Jews, affiliation with the so-called Aryan race had to be proved. It was paradoxical that racial features never determined one's affiliation, although the Nazis often discussed physiognomy: the only decisive factor was the religious affiliation of one's grandparents. While grandparents at an earlier date were able to choose their religion, their grandchildren in the Nazi era were compulsorily categorised as Jews, if three or four grandparents were registered as members of a Jewish congregation, regardless of the Halachah. According to Halachah, one was Jewish by being born of a Jewish mother, or by conversion.

The Nazi categorisation of Jews, and thus compulsory membership, comprised

1. mostly Jews and apostates of Jewish descent, but also many
2. Gentiles of Jewish descent, such as Catholics, irreligionists, and Protestants, who happened to have three or four grandparents belonging – according to the records – to a Jewish congregation.
3. all persons of Jewish faith were included, as indicated by their membership of a Jewish congregation as of 1935 (passing of the Nuremberg Laws), even if they had fewer than three Jewish grandparents.
4. persons with one or two Jewish grandparents, who were married with an enrolled member of a Jewish congregation (the latter two were called Geltungsjuden; literally, Jews by legal validity).

Not included were persons, who observed no or other than the Jewish religion, who had only up to maximally two grandparents who were enlisted in a Jewish congregation (so-called Mischlinge). Also those persons, with three or four Jewish grandparents were excluded, who were married with a person classified as a so-called Aryan in a so-called racially mixed marriage (the couple did not necessarily have to be an interfaith marriage, because only the grandparents' religious affiliation counted, not the possibly common faith personally confessed by both partners). Later this exception was restricted to persons living in a so-called privileged mixed couple, characterised by the fact that either the Gentile partner was the husband, having no children, or children who were brought up as Gentiles, or that in a couple, where the Gentile was the wife, they had children, who were brought up as Gentiles. A male spouse, classified as a Jew, in a childless couple, suffered all discriminations.

All persons included as compulsory members had to pay contributions for the maintenance of the bureaucracy and its tasks. They also all underlay the full discriminations and persecutions imposed by the Nazis and were publicly labelled by the Yellow badge from 1 September 1941.

== Emigration efforts ==
The Reich Association of Jews in Germany was responsible for supporting the emigration of German Jews; one of the main ways the association fulfilled this duty was through an emigration training farm in Gross-Bressen. The Reich Association of Jews in Germany created the emigration training farm in 1936 in order to teach German Jewish youth the necessary skills for emigration. This training farm was necessary because the Jewish youth often lacked the education and experience required to emigrate as a result of limited educational opportunities and a scarcity of German businesses willing to take on Jewish apprentices. When the camp was initially created, there were 125 trainees aged from fifteen to seventeen. These trainees learned basic housekeeping, artisan, farming, animal husbandry, and foreign language skills during a two-year program. Receiving countries valued the skills taught in the program and thus perceived the trainees as more qualified to immigrate into their country.

Initially the training camp at Gross-Bressen planned to send trainees abroad in order to establish various settlements. While the Reich Association created plans for a settlement in Brazil, their only successful settlement was in Virginia, United States. The Virginia settlement was made possible by William Thalhimer Sr., a business owner from Richmond, VA, who donated land for the trainees to settle on upon emigration to the U.S. This farm became known as Thalhimer's Hyde Farm and served as a communal farm where 37 trainees from the Gross-Bressen training farm successfully emigrated to. Despite the success at the U.S. farm, after Kristallnacht, Nazi authorities arrested many of the trainees and staff at the German farm and sent them to the Buchenwald concentration camp. The remaining trainees and staff continued operations at Gross-Bressen until 31 August 1941, when Gestapo officials dissolved the training farm and compelled the personnel into forced labor.

== Reichsvereinigung controlled as an organ of the RSHA ==
Different from the old Reichsvereinigung, which had been an umbrella of all different kinds of Jewish associations and congregations, representing their interests and organising self-help for Jews and Jewish organisations, the new Reichsvereinigung was meant to be a device to better control and discriminate against German and Austrian Jews and Gentiles of Jewish descent.

The new Reichsvereinigung had no internal autonomy. Members of its executive board were not elected, but appointed according to the wishes of the Gestapo. The Reichsvereinigung made the Jüdisches Nachrichtenblatt its press organ, since all the other 64 papers of Jewish alignment had been forbidden after the November Pogroms in 1938.

The government agencies occupied with the discrimination and persecution of German Jews (and Gentile Germans of Jewish descent), learnt their lesson from the public unease following the open terror during the November Pogroms. In order not to evoke unease among the general German population, the Reich government preferred to hide its activities. The Reichsvereinigung was charged with announcing the ever-growing number of anti-Semitic ordinances to its persecuted members, and supervising their obedience.

The decision to murder the Jews was made official policy at the Wannsee Conference (January 1942) which discussed its implementation. Government agencies involved were concerned about the acceptability of their actions. A huge logistical effort was made to transport the deportees over long distances to the East, instead of killing them by mobile squads – as practised in the occupied East – wherever they would find them.

Repeated deportations of German Jews to the East started on 18 October 1941.

After the Gestapo announced the date and the number of deportees, the Reichsvereinigung sometimes had to choose who was to be deported. Gestapo officials then collected the deportees from one of its premises, before loading them onto a train for transport. This could take up to a week of waiting. It is claimed by some Germans today that the Holocaust was carried out far away from the eyes and ears of the general German population and that therefore they had no idea of what was going on.

After most of its members had been deported, the RSHA forcibly dissolved the new Reichsvereinigung in June 1943 and its remaining employees—with the exception of Walter Lustig, the medical director of the Jewish Hospital of Berlin—were deported to Theresienstadt.

Following the dissolution, a new organization called the Rest-Reichsvereinigung was created, which was headed by Lustig and was located in the administration building of the Jewish Hospital. The organization maintained contact with "full Jews" in protected "mixed marriages," "legal Jews" (Geltungsjuden), and those who were protected by or claimed to be necessary by government organizations and high-ranking individuals.

Other than the Rest-Reichsvereinigung, the only Jewish organisations still in existence after June 1943 were the few hospitals such as the Jewish Hospital of Berlin and the Israelite Hospital of Hamburg, which mostly cared for Jews in mixed marriages.

== Card index of the Reichsvereinigung ==
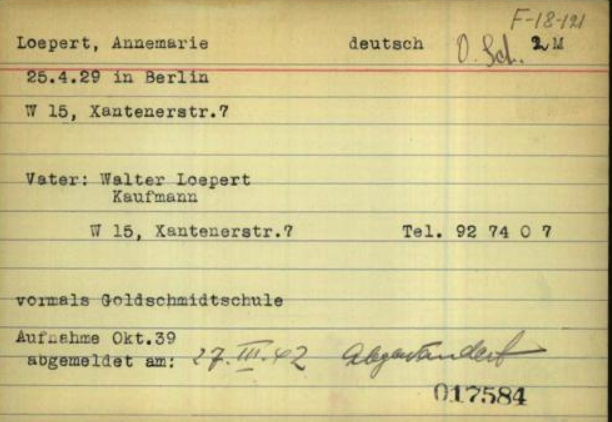
RvD index card with details of Annemarie Loepert: date of birth (1929), address, father's name, job, address and telephone number. Both Annemarie and her father were murdered in Piaski Ghetto in 1942.

Only a small proportion of the card index of the Reichsvereinigung has survived. Between 1947 and 1950, 32,000 index cards were given to the International Tracing Service (ITS). Apart from a "Deceased card file", an "Emigration card file" and a so-called "Foreigner card file", there was also the "Berlin pupil card file" with more than 10,000 cards that testify to the life of the Jewish children during the period of Nazi persecution. In 2017, the ITS has published the card index in its online archive.
