= Schottengymnasium =

Catholic school in Vienna

Coordinates: 48°12′46″N 16°21′52″E

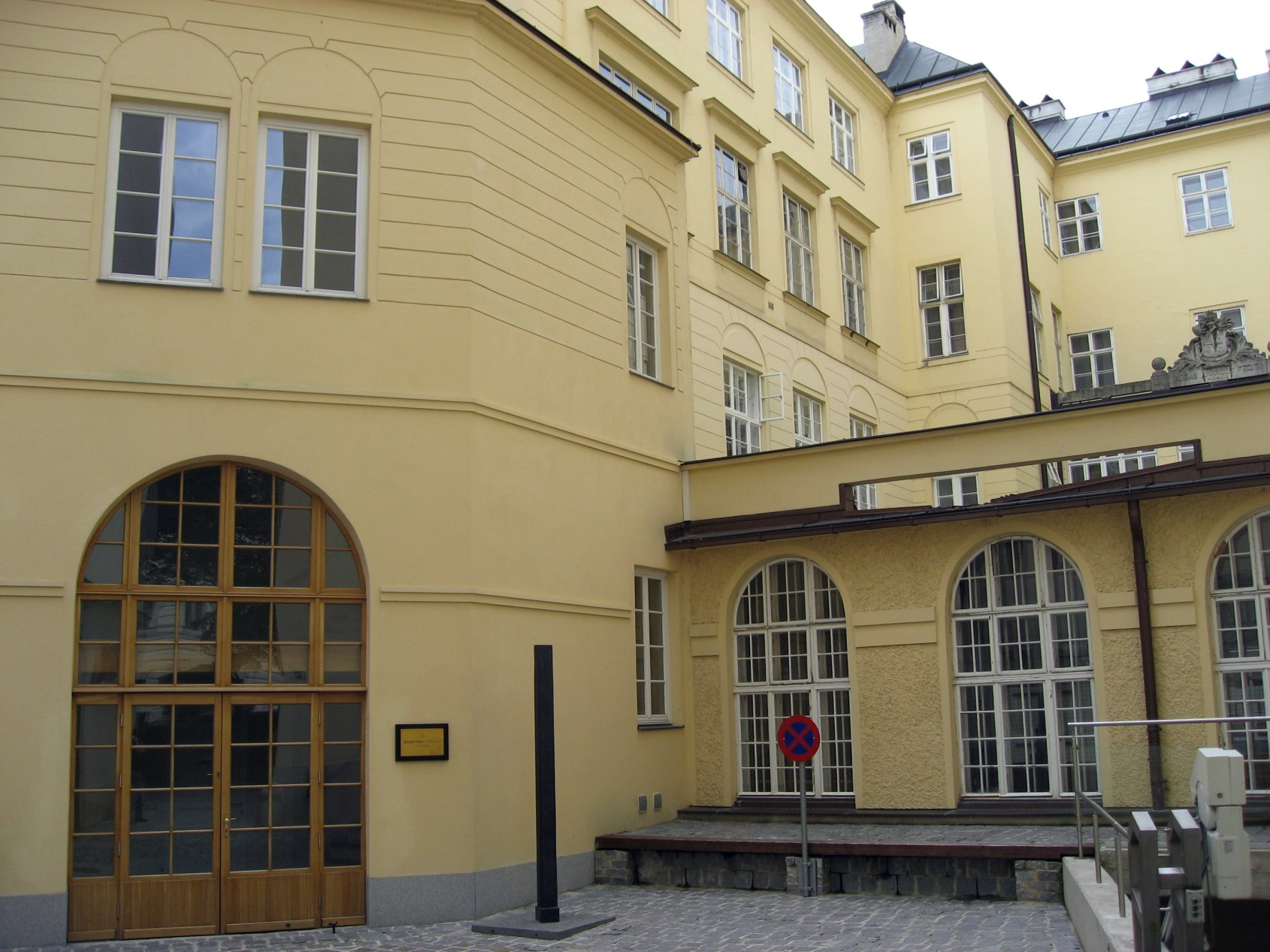
Schottengymnasium

Schottengymnasium (officially the Öffentliches Schottengymnasium der Benediktiner in Wien) is an independent Catholic gymnasium with public status in the First District of Vienna. The school was founded in 1807 by imperial decree, and is considered one of the most prestigious schools in Austria. Alumni of the school include three Nobel laureates, several notable politicians, monarchs, artists and scientists.

== Notable alumni ==
=== Politicians ===
- Anton von Doblhoff-Dier (1800–1872), Austrian Minister-President
- Lajos Batthyány (1807–1849), the first Prime Minister of Hungary
- Othmar Helferstorfer (1810–1880), Abbot of the Schottenstift, Landmarschall of Lower Austria
- Josef von Bauer (1817–1886), member of the Lower Austrian Landtag
- Eduard Herbst (1820–1892), Justice Minister of Cisleithania
- Franz Coronini von Cronberg (1833–1901), President of the Austrian Chamber of Deputies
- Heinrich von Wittek (1844–1930), Minister-President of Cisleithania
- Aloys von Liechtenstein (1846–1920), Landmarschall of Lower Austria
- Hugo von Glanz-Eicha (1848–1915), Minister of Trade of Cisleithania
- Guido von Call (1849–1927), Diplomat, Minister of Trade of Cisleithania
- Engelbert Pernerstorfer (1850–1918), Vice President of the Austrian Chamber of Deputies
- Alfred III. zu Windisch-Grätz (1851–1927), Minister-President of Cisleithania
- Victor Adler (1852–1918), founder of the Social Democratic Party of Austria
- Heinrich von Lützow (1852–1935), diplomat
- Heinrich Lammasch (1853–1920), last serving Minister-President of Cisleithania
- Franz I, Prince of Liechtenstein (1853–1938)
- Franz Klein (1854–1926), Justice Minister of Cisleithania
- Karl Beurle (1860–1919), Member of the Upper Austrian Landtag (Deutsche Volkspartei)
- Konrad zu Hohenlohe-Schillingsfürst (1863–1918), Minister-President of Cisleithania
- Viktor Kienböck (1873–1956), Austrian finance minister
- Prince Karl Aloys of Liechtenstein (1878–1955), Austrian Rittmeister and Governor of Liechtenstein
- Charles I of Habsburg-Este (1887–1922), last Emperor of Austria
- Karl Appel (1892–1967), member of the National Council (SPÖ)
- Franz Josef II, Prince of Liechtenstein (1906–1989)
- Leopold Guggenberger (born 1918), Mayor of Klagenfurt (ÖVP)
- Hans Tuppy (born 1924), Austrian Science Minister (ÖVP), Biochemist
- Manfred Mautner Markhof (1927–2008), member of the Federal Council (ÖVP), entrepreneur
- Franz Hums (born 1937), Austrian Labour and Social Affairs Minister (SPÖ)
- Michael Graff (1937–2008), general secretary of the Austrian People's Party (ÖVP)
- Peter Marboe (born 1942), Vienna city councillor for cultural affairs (ÖVP)
- Hans Adam II, Prince of Liechtenstein (born 1945)
- Wolfgang Schüssel (born 1945), former Chancellor of Austria (ÖVP)
- Rudolf Scholten (born 1955), former Austrian Minister of Science and Education (SPÖ)
- Christoph Chorherr (born 1960), former head of the Austrian Green Party
- Johannes Peterlik (born 1967), Austrian diplomat

=== Arts ===
- Franz Wild (1791–1860), opera singer
- Johann Nestroy (1801–1862), actor, playwright
- Eduard von Bauernfeld (1802–1890), poet
- Nikolaus Lenau (1802–1850), poet
- Moritz von Schwind (1804–1871), painter
- Friedrich Halm (1806–1871), poet, playwright
- Anastasius Grün (1806–1876), poet
- Gustav von Franck (1807–1860), writer
- Alexander von Bensa (1820–1902), artist
- Ferdinand Kürnberger (1821–1879), writer
- Johann Strauss II (1825–1899), composer
- Josef Strauss (1827–1870), composer
- Robert Hamerling (1830–1889), poet
- Karl Julius Ebersberg (1831–1876), writer
- Franz von Jauner (1831–1900), actor, theatre director
- Otto Bach (1833–1893), church musician, director of the Mozarteum
- Ferdinand von Saar (1833–1906), writer
- Josef von Doblhoff-Dier (1844–1928), writer, diplomat
- Alfred von Berger (1853–1912), dramaturge, director of the Burgtheater (Imperial Court Theatre)
- Max von Ferstel (1859–1936), architect
- Max Kurzweil (1867–1916), artist
- Maximilian Liebenwein (1869–1926), artist
- Leopold Andrian (1875–1951), writer, diplomat
- Alfred Neugebauer (1888–1957), writer
- Otto Friedländer (1889–1963), writer
- Georg Terramare (1889–1948), playwright
- Paul Elbogen (1894–1987), writer
- Eduard Volters (1904–1972), writer
- Franz Stoß (1909–1995), actor, director of the Burgtheater (Court Theatre) and the Theater in der Josefstadt
- Otto Ambros (1910–1979), writer
- Ernst Haeusserman (1916–1984), theatre director, stage director, writer and film producer
- Ernst Jandl (1925–2000), poet
- Wilfried Seipel (born 1944), former director of the Kunsthistorisches Museum
- Peter Planyavsky (born 1947), organist, composer
- Friedrich Dolezal, cellist of the Vienna Philharmonic Orchestra
- Clemens Hellsberg (born 1952), violinist, member of the board of the Vienna Philharmonic Orchestra
- Herbert Föttinger (born 1961), actor, director of the Theater in der Josefstadt
- Konstantin Reymaier (a.k.a. Erich Konstantin Reymaier) (born 1969), organist, composer, Catholic priest
- Rainer Frimmel (born 1971), photographer, film director
- Xaver Bayer (born 1977), writer
- Gottlieb Wallisch (born 1978), pianist

=== Science ===
- Adalbert Nikolaus Fuchs (1814–1886), director of the Polytechnic Institute
- Ernest Hauswirth (1818–1901), historian
- Karl Friesach (1821–1891), astrophysicist
- Franz von Hauer (1822–1899), geologist
- Sigismund Gschwandner (1824–1896), physicist
- Hugo Mareta (1827–1913), Germanist
- Vincenz Knauer (1828–1894), philosopher
- Hugo Kremer von Auenrode (1833–1888), Rector of the University of Prague
- Anton Mayer (1838–1924), historian
- Karl Exner (1842–1914), physicist
- Heinrich Obersteiner (1847–1922), neurologist
- Cölestin Wolfsgruber (1848–1924), church historian
- Hans von Chiari (1851–1916), pathologist
- Heinrich Friedjung (1851–1920), historian, journalist
- Ernst Fuchs (1851–1930), ophthalmologist
- Franz von Liszt (1851–1919), jurist, criminologist, politician
- Sigmund Adler (1853–1920), historian
- Friedrich Becke (1855–1931), mineralogist
- Jakob Minor (1855–1912), scholar
- August Sauer (1855–1926), scholar
- Joseph Seemüller (1855–1920), Germanist
- Alexander Dedekind (1856–1940), Egyptologist
- Julius Wagner-Jauregg (1857–1940), psychiatrist
- Heinrich Swoboda (1861–1923), pastoral theologian
- Lothar von Frankl-Hochwart (1862–1914), neurologist
- Albert Starzer (1863–1909), historian
- Eduard Zirm (1863–1944), ophthalmologist
- Ivo Pfaff (1864–1925), historian of law
- Ernst Kalinka (1865–1946), classical philologist, rector of the University of Innsbruck
- Albert Hübl (1867–1931), historian
- Carl von Kraus (1868–1952), Germanist
- Michael Maria Rabenlechner (1868–1952), scholar
- Maximilian Bittner (1869–1918), orientalist
- Karl Inama von Sternegg (1871–1931), genealogist, scholar of heraldry
- Clemens von Pirquet (1874–1929), immunologist
- Carl Furtmüller (1880–1951), psychologist
- Franz Exner (1881–1947), criminologist
- Karl von Frisch (1886–1982), ethologist, Nobel Prize in Physiology or Medicine 1973
- Franz Borkenau (1900–1957), Geschichtsphilosopher, Soziologe
- Konrad Lorenz (1903–1989), ethologist, Nobel Prize in Physiology or Medicine 1973
- Peter Beck-Mannagetta (1913–1998), geologist
- Michael Mitterauer (born 1937), historian
- Günter Virt (born 1940), theologian
- Herbert Laszlo (1940–2009), scholar in happiness economics
- Georg Braulik (born 1941), biblical scholar (Old Testament)
- Kurt Gschwantler (born 1944), classical archaeologist
- Wolfgang Lutz (born 1956), demographer
- Matthias Scheutz (born 1966), researcher in artificial intelligence and cognitive science
- Michael Schaefberger (born 1967), opinion pollster
- Drehli Robnik (born 1967), scholar in film studies

=== Others ===
- Urban Loritz (1807–1881), minister
- Sebastian Brunner (1814–1893), theologian, writer
- Anton von Petz (1819–1885), admiral
- Hermann Schubert) (1826–1892), minister
- Clemens Kickh (1827–1913), Hofprediger (preacher at court)
- Adolf Kern (1829–1906), minister
- Sigmund Mayer (1832–1920), businessman
- Alexander von Dorn (1838–1919), publicist, economist
- Leopold Rost (1842–1913), abbot of the Schottenstift
- Albert Figdor (1843–1927), banker, art collector
- Karl Graf Lanckoroński (1848–1933), patron of art
- Eugen Böhm von Bawerk (1851–1914), national economist
- Friedrich von Wieser (1851–1926), national economist
- Wilhelm Janauschek (1859–1926), missionary
- Julius Meinl III (1903–1991), entrepreneur (Julius Meinl)
- Heinrich Treichl (born 1913), general manager of the Creditanstalt Bank
- Otto Schönherr (1922–2015), journalist, editor-in-chief of the Austria Press Agency
- Fritz Molden (1924–2014), journalist, publisher
- Gustav Harmer (born 1934), beer brewer (Brauerei Ottakringer, Grieskirchner)
- Heinrich Ferenczy (born 1938), abbot of the Schottenstift and Stift St. Paul in Lavanttal
- Hans-Georg Possanner (1940–2006), Pressesprecher der Ständigen Vertretung Österreichs bei der EU
- Franz Hlavac (born 1948), Wirtschaftsjournalist (ORF)
- Johannes Jung (born 1952), abbot of the Schottenstift
- Andreas Treichl (born 1952), general manager of the Erste Bank
- Christoph Herbst (born 1960), Constitutional Court judge
- Nikolaus Krasa (born 1960), vicar general of the Roman Catholic Archdiocese of Vienna
- Rudolf Mitlöhner (born 1965), journalist, editor-in-chief of the Die Furche magazine
- Lothar Tschapka (born 1966), elocutionist
- Georg Spatt (born 1967), director of the Hitradio Ö3 radio channel at the ORF (broadcaster) (Austrian Broadcasting Corporation)
- Niki Zitny (born 1973), golfer
