= Julius Mannaberg =

Hungarian physician and researcher of Jewish heritage

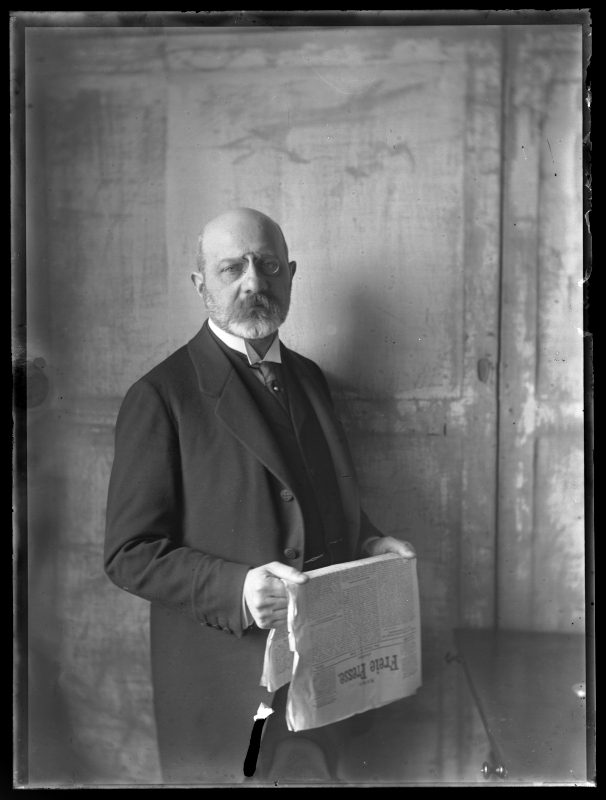
- Born: 9 May 1860
- Died: 17 August 1941 (aged 81)

Gyula Mannaberg, in German: Julius Mannaberg (Pest, 9 May 1860 – Vienna, 17 August 1941) was a Hungarian physician and researcher of Jewish heritage, and cousin of Rózsi Mannaberg (1895–1986), a pianist.

== Life ==
Mannaberg was born the son of Mihály Mannaberg (1829–1903), a merchant, and Róza Gutman (1830–1904). Between 1870 and 1878, he studied at the Royal Hungarian Teacher Training Institute's Practical High School. He continued his studies at the University of Vienna, where he was awarded a doctorate in medical sciences in 1884. His first job was in the dermatology department headed by Mór Kaposi. In 1891 he became assistant to the world famous internist Hermann Nothnagel. In 1890, he was awarded an Oppolzer Fellowship and was commissioned to detect the causative agent of malaria and to study the infection. He published a report on his research in 1893. He wrote the introduction and a chapter on bacteria for Nothangel's work on intestinal diseases, published in 1898. In March 1902, he was made an extraordinary professor by the University of Vienna, and in 1909 he became a member of the Supreme Medical Council. In the book Urologie by Frisch and Otto Zuckerkandl, he wrote the chapter on "Diseases of the kidneys and renal pelvis". In 1912 he was appointed deputy director of the Polyclinic, and after 1918 he was appointed director. In 1921 he presented a new clinical picture called 'Stenonephrie', in which he dealt with internal changes in the kidney. He was also concerned with the effects of hypertension on the internal secretory glands. He retired in 1930. His grave is in the Döbling cemetery.

He wrote articles on medical bacteriology for the Prague Vierteljahrschrift für Dermatologie (1887. Über die Mikroorganismen der normale Urethra sat.), the Zeitschrift für klinische Medicin (XVIII. Zur Aetiologie des Morbus Brightii sat.), and the Centralblatt für klinische Medicin (1891. Beiträge zur Morphologie des Plasmodium malariae tertianae) and other publications and was translated into English.

In 1936, he married Leopoldine Mannaberg. They had a daughter born in 1933.

== Art collection ==
Mannanberg collected art.

== Nazi era ==
When Austria merged with Nazi Germany in the Anschluss of 1938, Mannanberg was persecuted due to his Jewish heritage despite his conversion to Catholicism. In accordance with Nazi anti-Jewish laws he had to declare his assets so that they could be valued and confiscated. By 12 November 1938 he had sold much of his art collection. On 6 February 1939, he was ordered to pay a special tax that targeted Jews, the Jewish Asset Levy (Judenvermögensabgabe) of RM 22,000.

Julius Mannaberg died in Vienna on 17 August 1941. His bank account was seized on the pretext that he still owed part of the Jewish asset tax.

In 1944, his widow Leopoldine Mannaberg attempted raise cash by selling art from their collection. According to the restitution decision rendered by the Austrian authorities in 2014, "Nebehay stated that Leopoldine Mannaberg 'lived in dire straits and was more or less reliant on the sale of her affairs'. One of the sales involved an artwork by Cecil van Haanen which she sold through Antiquariat V. A. Heck to Hermann Voss’ art consultant Gottfried Reimer. After the war the artwork was recovered by the Allies and then transferred in 1963 via depots of the Federal Monuments Office to the Albertina Museum in Vienna, where it was inventoried in 1965.

== Restitution of looted art ==
In 2014 the Austrian authorities recommended restitution of the artwork that Mannaberg's widow had been obliged to sell.

== Works ==
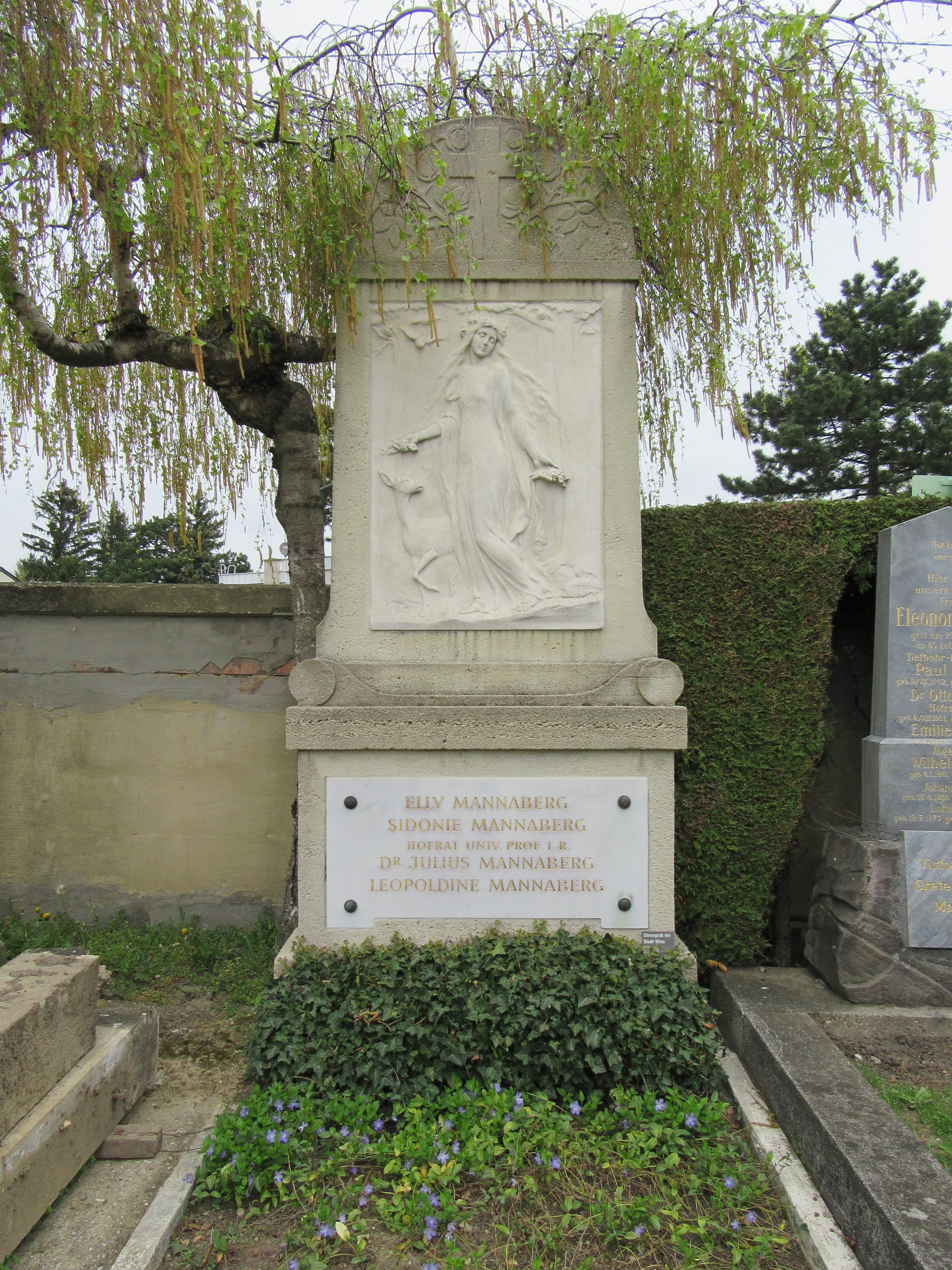
His grave in the Döbling cemetery

- Die Malaria-Parasiten (Wien, 1893)
- Die Malaria-Krankheiten (Wien, 1899)

== See also ==
- Aryanization
- The Holocaust in Austria
- History of the Jews in Austria

== Sources ==
- Szinnyei, József (2000), Magyar írók élete és munkái [Life and Works of Hungarian Writers] (in Hungarian), Budapest: Arcanum, ISBN 978-9638602992
- Dr. Emed Alexander: Emlékezés Mannaberg Gyulára. (1861-1941)
- Österreichisches Biographisches Lexikon 1815-1950, Bd. 6 (Lfg. 26, 1973), S. 55
- Wien Geschichte Wiki

== More information ==
- Eisenberg, Ludwig, Das geistige Wien. Wien, 1893. 325. old.
- Győry Tibor, Magyarország orvosi Bibliographiája. Budapest, 1900. 18., 93. old.
