= Franz Exner (criminologist) =

Austrian-German criminologist and criminal lawyer

- Born: 9 August 1881; Vienna, Austria
- Died: 1 October 1947 (aged 66); Munich, Bavaria, US occupation zone (Germany)
- Education: "Schottengymnasium", Vienna; University of Vienna; Heidelberg University
- Occupations: Lawyer/Jurist; Judge; Criminologist; University professor Author & law journalist
- Spouse: Marianne von Wieser (1888–1920)
- Children: Adolf Exner (20 April 1911 – 22 September 1941); Liselotte Exner (29 December 1912 – 2 January 1913); Nora Exner (22 September 1914 – 10 August 1999)
- Parent(s): Adolf Exner (1841–1894); Constanze Grohmann (1858–1922)

Franz Exner (9 August 1881 – 1 October 1947) was an Austrian-German criminologist and criminal lawyer. Alongside Edmund Mezger, Hans von Hentig and Gustav Aschaffenburg, he was a leading and in some respects a representative of the German school of criminology (which at that time tended to treat criminology as a branch of Jurisprudence, rather than as a branch of the Social sciences) in the first half of the twentieth century. During the 1920s and 1930s, Exner produced work on the interface between Criminology and Sociology. He became a controversial figure among subsequent generations because of the extent to which during the 1930s and 1940s his ideas evolved towards National Socialist ideology, notably with regard to so-called "criminal biology", which, by more recent criteria imputed excessive weight to the role of hereditary factors (as opposed to environmental influences and pressures) as causes of criminal actions.

== Life ==
=== Family provenance ===
Franz Exner was born in Vienna. On his father's side he came from a family of intellectuals and high achievers. His grandfather, Franz Serafin Exner (1802–1853), had been a professor of philosophy at Prague and, through his Herbartian advocacy and writings, one of the architects of important Austrian school reforms in the later nineteenth century. His father, Adolf Exner (1841–1894), was a Law professor. His uncles Karl, Sigmund and Franz achieved notability in the fields, respectively, of Physics, Psychology and (again) Physics, while his aunt was both the mother of a future Nobel Prize winner and the wife of a leading Viennese urologist. His mother, born Constanze Grohmann (1858–1922), was the daughter of a factory owner. The Grohmanns were a family of bankers, formerly from Saxony. Links between the Exner and Grohmann families went back several generations. Franz Exner later identified his evidently formidable Anglo-Irish maternal grandmother Fanny Grohmann-Reade (1831-1907), a gregarious free-spirited woman who had grown up - despite aristocratic connections - in relative poverty, as the most significant woman in his life.

=== Early years ===
Exner covered the first four years of the school curriculum through private tutoring provided by his mother and by Gisa Conrad, a close family friend. He was then enrolled at the "Schottengymnasium", a private Catholic secondary school in the heart of Vienna. He successfully completed his schooling in 1900. Still not quite 19, he now took what amounted to a gap year, which he spent as an army volunteer in the Salzburg-based 41st field gun regiment. He then studied Jurisprudence at Vienna and Heidelberg between 1901 and 1905. He passed the three usual national law exams between 26 October 1905 and 19 February 1906. (Note: The standard national law exams were: * The "judizielle Rigorosum" which Exner passed on 26 October 1905, * The "staatswissenschaftliche Rigorosum" which he passed on 12 January 1906 and * The "rechtshistorische Rigorosum" which he passed on 19 February 1906.) It was from the University of Vienna that he was awarded his doctorate in law on 20 February 1906. (Note: At this time submission of a doctoral dissertation was not one of the requirements for a doctorate from the University of Vienna Law faculty.) This was followed on 5 April 1906 by Exner's legal traineeship, which enabled him to gain his first practical experience of the judiciary in Vienna, leading to his being listed as an "Auskultant" (candidate for judicial office) on 31 December 1906. During this period he was also retaining the military connections he had established during his year as an army volunteer in 1900. He undertook thee 28 day stretch of weapons training with the Austro-Hungarian Army in 1902, 1904 and 1906, thereby rising to the militia rank of "Austrian Landsturm Oberleutnant". He was able to delay his traineeship by a year in order to spend a year in Berlin during 1907/08, undertaking research work at the Criminology Seminar run by the Austrian-born reformer Franz von Liszt. (Note: The composer Franz Liszt was a cousin (and an informal Godfather) to the criminologist Franz von Liszt.) Von Liszt's influence on Exner's own later work would be enduring.

=== Marianne von Wieser ===
Franz Exner married Baroness Marianne von Wieser in March 1910. Marianne was the daughter of Friedrich von Wieser (1851-1926), an economist and (briefly) imperial Trade minister. Two of the young couple's children, Adolf and Nora born respectively in 1911 and 1914, grew to adulthood. Their second daughter, Lieselotte Exner, died in January 1913 after just five days, following which Marianne fell into a deep and lasting depression. On 18 December 1920, Marianne Exner committed suicide. Exner was devastated by the loss of his younger daughter and then of his wife: there would be no second marriage.

=== War ===
War broke out, from an Austrian perspective on 2 August 1914. As a Landsturm Oberleutnant in the army reserve, Franz Exner was immediately drafted into the Salzburg regiment with which he had been associated during the years of peace (by this time the 8th field gun regiment) and sent to the Dolomites front. He took part in several intense battles between 1915 and 1916 and received a number of medals. It is apparent from his letters home that by the end of 1916 he was nevertheless becoming increasingly pessimistic over the likely outcome of the war. He was released from service with the rank of Oberleutnant on 11 December 1916 and for the final one and a half years of the war returned to his work as a Law Professor at the University of Prague. It is clear that his war-time experiences influenced him decisively and repeatedly in respect of his subsequent career decisions.

=== Professor ===
==== Habilitation ====
Franz Exner received his habilitation (higher post-graduate degree) from the University of Vienna in 1910, which, other things being equal, opened the way to a life-long teaching career in the universities sector. He received his habilitation after submitting a dissertation on "The essence of negligence" ("das Wesen der Fahrlässigkeit ") which is, according to one admirer, an object lesson in dogmatic structural clarity, and amply demonstrated his suitability for a legal career, based on his insightful approach to the realities of life, his instinct for the balance of justice and his sober objectivity. He remained at Vienna between 1910 and 1912, employed as a university tutor (Privatdozent), also undertaking judicial work at the Vienna District High Court. In addition, during these two years he was making frequent visits to Berlin, but the purpose and nature of those trips remains unclear.

==== Czernowitz ====
In 1912 he accepted his first professorship, which meant moving to Czernowitz University (as Chernivtsi was then known), just 12 km (7 miles) from the Russian fronter, in the Duchy of Bukovina: Bukovina was at that time one of the Cisleithanian crown lands of Austria. In 1920, Bukovina became part of Romania. Even in 1916, Czernowitz felt exotic, and a very long way from Vienna, and in professional terms many of his younger colleagues regarded their professorships as stepping stones rather than permanent postings. In a personal note from 1922, found in his personal papers long after his death, he likens the journey to travelling "in the wild east". The Exners had originally intended that their second child should be born at Czernowitz, but in the end this was deemed "too dangerous" and Marianne remained in Vienna for the birth, which took place on 28 December 1912, and was followed by the baby's death a few days later. Increasingly during this period Exner was separated from Marianne and the two (after 1914) surviving children who preferred to remain safely in Vienna or stay with Franz Exner's mother at the family estate surrounding Schloss Matzen. The separation was intensified when Exner was called away to fight between 1914 and 1916. Marianne wrote every week, sending copious supplies of food and cigarettes. Her letters contain abundant detail of her mundane life with the children, their nanny "Pepi" and "Lord", the dog. They also show how desperately affected the couple were by their continuing enforced separation.

==== Prague, Tübingen, Leipzig ====
In 1916, he switched to Prague where between 1916 and 1919 he held a full professorship. He moved on to the University of Tübingen in 1919. The 1920s were a particularly productive decade in terms of his published output. His next move was to Leipzig University where he remained between 1921 and 1933 and where he served, between 1926 and 1928, as dean of the Law Faculty. On 1 April 1933, Exner transferred to the Ludwig-Maximilians-Universität München, accepting the professorship in criminal law, criminal process and criminology.

==== Munich ====
In January 1933, the Hitler government took power and quickly transformed Germany into a one-party dictatorship. Franz Exner had no enthusiasm for the National Socialists, but he had evidently been unwilling (or unable) to dissuade Adolf and Nora, his two children, from joining The Party during or before 1932. Exner had still been at Leipzig University when Hitler took over from Chancellor von Schleicher, but arrangements for his move to the Ludwig-Maximilians-Universität München were already well advanced. During his first term at the Ludwig-Maximilians-Universität München, it became apparent that he would not be able to provide the "Aryan certificate" which public sector workers - including those in the education sector - were required to give their employers under the Law for the Restoration of the Professional Civil Service of 7 April 1933. However, at the insistence of President von Hindenburg the law underwent a last minute modification whereby it contained an exemption for "Frontkämpfer" (World War veterans). The race laws were progressively further tightened during the ensuing twelve Nazi years, but somehow Franz Exner would retain his professorship at the Ludwig-Maximilians-Universität München throughout (and beyond) the Hitler years. He joined the "Nationalsozialistischer Rechtswahrerbund" (loosely, "National Socialist Association of Legal Professionals") which had superseded the former professional lawyers' associations and he suffered no immediately obvious professional disadvantage as a result of not having been able to demonstrate the non-Jewish provenance of one of his grandmothers. Nevertheless, his personnel file at the university included notes both of his "distanced relationship" with National Socialism and of his "Jewish ancestry". He remained under the constant threat of being reclassified as a Jewish "Mischling" (loosely, "Half-caste") and ejected from teaching work until May 1945, when military defeat was accompanied by the collapse of the régime. In March 1941, Franz Exner underwent another follow-up investigation into his "racial purity", and although he retained his professorship, he was removed from the Ludwig-Maximilians-Universität München's Governing Council ("Verwaltungsrat") shortly afterwards.

After 1945, Exner was unusual among his colleagues in retaining his professorship under the military occupation. He had kept his job under the Hitler government but had never been a "Nazi Party" member. During the "Denazification programme" that followed, the new rulers determined that he was "politisch unbelastet" ("politically unencumbered"). By the time he died in 1947 he was one of a very small number of well known criminologists to have studied and taught under no fewer than four contrasting ruling establishments: the (1) Danube Monarchy until 1918, the (2) German Republic until 1933, the Populist-nationalist Dictatorship until 1945 and the (4) Stalinist annexations and military occupation that followed. After the launch of the German Federal Republic (West Germany) in 1949 it transpired that his reputation would remain, if not untarnished, at least broadly intact under a fifth ruling establishment.

During the 1920s and 1930s, Exner's international contacts, notably with professional colleagues in the United States were of particular significance. He conducted a lengthy correspondence with the Sociologist-criminologist and Symbolic interactionist Edwin Sutherland at Minnesota (after 1930 at Chicago). During 1934 during the long vacation he undertook a visit to the United States lasting several months and was able to meet up with Sutherland face-to-face. He also met up with others in the field, including Ernest Burgess (also at Chicago) and Thorsten Sellin at Philadelphia. On his return he shared his experiences of the American system of Penology and his researches into the latest associated academic literature, publishing his "Kriminalistischen Bericht über eine Reise nach Amerika" ("Report on Criminology from a visit to America") in 1935 in the quarterly specialist journal Zeitschrift für die gesamte Strafrechtswissenschaft.

=== Nuremberg ===
In 1946/47, Exner teamed up with another law professor, Hermann Jahrreiß, to appear at one of the Nuremberg military tribunals as the defence team representing General Alfred Jodl in his trial for war crimes. Jodl, who had served as the Chief of the Operations Staff of the German Armed Forces High Command throughout World War II, was convicted and was hanged on 16 October 1946.

== Memberships and learned journals ==
Franz Exner was a member of the Austrian regional group of the International Criminology Association ("Internationale Kriminalistische Vereinigung" / IKV) from 1911. He was editor-publisher of the journal "Kriminalistische Abhandlungen" between 1926 and 1941. In 1936, he teamed up with fellow-jurist Rudolf Sieverts and the physician-psychiatrists Johannes Lange, Hans Reiter and Hans Bürger-Prinz to co-produce the "Monatsschrift für Kriminalpsychologie und Strafrechtsreform" (rebranded in 1937, out of deference to National Socialism, as the "Monatsschrift für Kriminalbiologie und Strafrechtsreform"). In 1937, he became deputy vice-president of the "Criminal Biology Society", an interdisciplinary collaboration between academic criminology, those investigating the pseudo-science of "criminal biology" and "the [government] authorities".

== Works ==
=== Overview ===
Franz Exner's contributions to Crime science stand in the tradition of his two academic criminal law teachers, the "modern" or "sociological" school represented, above all, by Franz von Liszt and the Swiss Criminal law professor, Carl Stooss. Exner built on and progressed the ideas of both these mentors. After completing his Habilitation in 1910 at Vienna, with a dissertation on "The essence of negligence" ("das Wesen der Fahrlässigkeit "), for which he was supervised by Stooss, he dedicated himself primarily to themes involving Criminal Policy and Criminology.

He actively backed the implementation of criminal law reforms, inspired by von Liszt and Carl Stooss. He distanced himself from von Liszt's concept of a one-tracked structure of "preventive and protective punishment" ("präventiven Schutzstrafe"), favouring instead a two-pronged criminal justice model based on ideas elaborated by Stooss. The system of repressive punishment should be a separate and completely independent from a structure of special preventive "security measures" ("Sicherungsmittel"). In this respect, Exner anticipated the twenty-first century approach to criminal law (in Germany) which is based on a very clear distinction between "penalties" and "measures" (termed by Exner as "security measures" / "Sicherungsmittel").

As a criminologist, Exner views criminal behaviour both on the macro level, as a broadly observable social phenomenon and on the micro level, created by personality traits of the individual perpetrator(s). The criminal act was, therefore, a result derived in a complex manner from a combination of opportunity, inherent predisposition and environmental factors. What derived from inherent predisposition on the part of an individual was on the one had a function of the contextual environment in which the individual exists and on the other hand a situationally defined course of action, which in turn was influenced significantly by those broader contextual factors. There is also a clear evolution in his thinking over time: during the republic years there is an emphasis on prioritizing social causes of criminal behaviour including, notably, the impact of wartime experiences on individuals. Later those "inherent predisposition" elements were very much more to the fore, though he never completely excluded the impact of "social factors".

=== Exner as criminal-sociologist ===
During the Weimar years Exner emerged as a leading representative of the new academic discipline of Criminal Sociology in the German-speaking world. Exner's first significant published work dealing with sociological aspects of criminology, appearing in 1919, was his long essay / short book "Gesellschaftliche und staatliche Strafjustiz". That was followed in 1926 by his lengthy treatise "Krieg und Kriminalität in Österreich" as well as critical studies on the preventive effects of the death penalty, published by "Monatsschrift" in 1929 in an influential article headed "Mord und Todesstrafe in Sachsen". His 1931 work, "Studien über die Strafzumessungspraxis der deutschen Gerichte" summarized the results of related empirical judicial research. Exner then prepared a summary of his work on Criminal Sociology since 1919, probably during 1932/33, which appeared only in 1936 as a substantial contribution in the second volume of the (at that time still) authoritative "Handwörterbuchs der Kriminologie". In the context of the times, he presented a surprisingly broad vision of Criminal Sociology in this piece, expressly highlighting a distinction between "Criminal Sociology in the narrow sense" and "Criminal Sociology in a broader sense".

Exner's definition of "Criminal Sociology in the narrow sense" can already be seen as quite innovative for the 1930s: his vision of criminal sociology was as a value-free facts-based discipline. Its purpose was to define crime as a social phenomenon and to explain and contextualise it in sociological terms. It was an approach that corresponded with the paradigm of an aetiological (causal) approach to criminology. Although the concept was not wholly novel internationally, Franz Exner was the first academic criminologist in the German-speaking world to define Criminology purely in terms of the social causes of crime. For instance his old mentor during his year in Berlin, Franz von Liszt, described crime as a "social phenomenon" early on in his career. But for Liszt Criminal Sociology was a form of umbrella discipline, and one that embraced "Criminal Anthropology". Nor did the idea of Criminal Sociology as a value-free discipline among more contemporary scholars of the subject. Wilhelm Sauer, a near contemporary who, like Exner, combined a full legal background with a career as an academic criminologist, always saw it as the mission of the Criminal Sociologist to add a layer of "ethicalisation" to the criminal justice apparatus. Criminal Sociology, for Sauer, existed "not to support but to oppose the criminal": this placed him unambiguously in opposition to the idea of Criminal Sociology as a value-free academic discipline.

Exner then distanced himself further from von Liszt when it came to criminal sociology in the broader sense. Part of his purpose was to extend the discipline, so that it no longer merely stopped after investigating the perpetrator and the crime, but also concerned itself with the social and governmental-legal framework impacting the phenomenon of criminality. Aspects of "social control" and of "society" more generally were legitimate objects of criminological research, of equal importance with the actions of criminals. This proposed broadening of the criminological field was unheard of at that time in the German-speaking world.

The sub-discipline of the "Sociology of Criminal Prosecution" incorporated empirical research into the functioning of the criminal justice system and of the people who were part of it (judges, prosecutors and court staff). This included research into sentencing practices in the German courts, and can be regarded as an early contribution to forms of criminological research that became more mainstream only after 1945. Exner undertook a statistical analysis of records from the justice system covering the years from 1880 and 1927 and identified both significant changes in the penalties imposed and a substantial (and growing) divergence between legislative and judicial approaches. Exner attributed the difference between the legislative and judicial approaches to the fact that judges, unlike legislatures, believed themselves called upon to incorporate, in their sentencing approaches, a moralistic focus based on the ethics of "everyday life". Referencing a verdict attributed to Max Weber, Exner concluded that judicial action in this respect was essentially "tradition-based, and not based on reason". Additionally, a "sociology of the perception of crime" was necessary, to examine how "society" judges crime and reacts to criminal actions, in order to be able to provide a fully thought through comparison between the approach taken by state agencies and the approach taken by specialist academics. Exner had already addressed this concern in 1919, in his essay "Gesellschaftliche und Staatliche Strafjustiz" (loosely, "Social justice and state justice"). At that time he had concluded that society's evaluation and the state's evaluation of some classes of crime - especially, but not exclusively, those involving political delinquency and negligence - differed very substantially. Unlike the state, society tended to prefer a moralistic and retaliatory approach to justice in these instances. Society is far more concerned with the details of the planning and arrangements of the criminal act(s) alleged - covering matters concerning which the state can in most instances afford to be indifferent - sometimes to the point at which society can be persuaded to take a more "indulgent" view than the state.

Through opening up such a broad research field as part of Criminal Sociology in the early 1930s, Exner anticipated the emergence of "Critical criminology" and "Labelling theory", which really only became mainstream in West Germany during the 1960s. This has led at least one commentator to conclude that Exner must already have been aware of the "partially social construction of the phenomenon of criminality". That view does not go uncontested, however. Exner never lost interest in the practical application of his research findings. For Exner, throughout his life, Criminal Sociology remained an auxiliary discipline - albeit in many ways a free-standing one - to Criminal Justice. Exner's "broad understanding of Criminal Sociology" should not necessarily be seen as having intended criticism of the ways in which the complementary and overlapping disciplines involved were seen in his own day.

During the Hitler years Exner no longer returned to questions involving "Criminal Sociology in a broader sense". The relevant chapters in his major book of 1939 on "Criminal Biology" restrict themselves to the Aetiological issues concerning "Criminal Sociology in the narrow sense". He went further, by dropping references to "gesellschaftliche Bedingtheit" (loosely, "social conditioning") and substituting the far less precise term "umweltliche Bedingtheit" (loosely, "contextual conditioning"). What might otherwise have been seen as his contribution in developing "Criminal Sociology" was accordingly set aside for more than a generation.

=== Exner's methodology and philosophy of justice ===
In terms of methodology, Exner based his approach both on the Neo-Kantianism associated with the so-called South-west German school and on the ideas of the sociologist Max Weber, who was also heavily influenced, especially in his earlier years, by Kantian ethics.

The influence of Neo-Kantianism is particularly apparent in Exner's insistence on a fundamental "Is–ought dichotomy", whereby an "ought" can never be derived from an "is". This underlying thesis implicitly requires a methodological autonomy separating the discipline of Criminology (concerned with what "is") and that of Criminal Justice (concerned with what "ought" to be). In this connection, Exner expressly references the teaching of the Neo-Kantian philosopher Heinrich Rickert: as a discipline that strives to identify generally applicable legal precepts, Criminology is, in terms of Rickert's insights, "Nomothetic" (objectively knowledge and fact based).

Keen to apply a "comprehending sociology" to Criminal Sociology and Psychology, Exner explicitly linked his work to Max Weber's epistemology. In his 1939 text book on "criminal biology", he emphasizes the need to "understand a crime empathically", grasping the subjective elements attached by the perpetrator to the crime. That is very far from being the only respect in which Exner invokes Weber. The divergence between tradition-based judicial action and the more reason-based approach favoured by legislators, discussed briefly above in connection with the sentencing practice of German courts, is another case in point. Exner's efforts in this regard appear, nevertheless, to stop short of a natural conclusion. Whole areas of "comprehending sociology" had simply never been followed through by him at the time of his death.

In referencing Neo-Kantian base theses, Exner became almost unique among criminologists in Germany during the National Socialist years. Hans Kelsen, whose "pure legal theory", self-evidently built on Neo-Kantianism, emigrated to the United States. Gustav Radbruch, another brilliant representative of Neo-Kantian theories of justice, lost his professorship on "political [and presumably race-based] grounds" in 1933 and took great care, between 1933 and 1945, to deal only with topics deemed "politically non-contentious". Most of the Nazi law professors, such as Hans Welzel, Karl Larenz and Georg Dahm, rejected Neo-Kantianism, insisting that "the essence of the German peoples' community" (corresponding to the Neo-Kantian "is") and its "order" (corresponding to the "ought") had come together. A separation between "is" and "ought" was, according to this interpretation, an "un-German" and thereby "artificial" construct, which should on that basis be rejected.

In terms of his "philosophy of justice", Exner's approach was essentially utilitarian. One of his core contentions was that, at least in the long term, justice and expediency will tend to coincide. But he introduced an important time-based qualification. Things that contemporaries might consider "just" might have been considered "mere expediency" in the past. In such instances, today's "justice" becomes yesterday's "expediency". Where criminal justice fell back on moral precepts, the impetus for the approach should never rest on simple moral grounds, but should be firmly based on "considerations of expediency". A criminal justice that simply ignored the moral views of society could not, by definition, be adequately "expedient", because such an approach would fail the necessary test of social acceptability. In this sense, as early as 1914, Exner was setting out unambiguously the need for a simple broadly-applied preventative strategy, rejecting any connection between punishment and retribution. Despite the political changes through which he lived, most obviously after 1933, Exner remained consistent on this aspect of Criminal Justice throughout his life.

=== Under National Socialism ===
After 1933, Exner tended to move away from criminal-sociological theses and towards criminal-anthropological (race-based) theses. His arguments during the Hitler years never entirely ignored the sociological aspects of criminology, however. He still presented the phenomenon of criminality as resulting both from inherent and contextual factors. Furthermore he insisted that even where an "inherently criminal predisposition" ("anlagebedingten ...") to commit crime was identified, that was in itself also contextually defined to the extent that it resulted from the impact of external factors on members of previous generations. In 1939, in a review of the first edition of Exner's major work "Kriminalbiologie", Edmund Mezger felt able to share his insight that Exner's preferred discipline was obviously Criminal Sociology [rather than "Criminal Biology"]. It is interesting to note that Exner's book "Kriminalbiologie" was reviewed in the specialist journal "Kriminalbiologie in der Zeitschrift für die gesamte Strafrechtswissenschaft" not in the "Criminal Biology" section but in the Criminal Sociology section. With respect to his attitude on specific aspects of National Socialist criminal policy, secondary literature of the period cites Exner judiciously. He remained critical of unqualified references to the "healthy gut feeling of the people" ("gesunde Volksempfinden"), preferring to see the concept applied, if at all, only where empirically supported. He continued to advocate a rational basis for criminal policy and was critical of purely "emotional" and thereby irrational direction of the party criminal policy endorsed by Dahm, Schaffstein and the politician-judge Roland Freisler.

He nevertheless increasingly relegated criminal sociological arguments below "racist" ones that ascribed criminal acts to genetically derived "criminal-anthropological" causes. This clearly contradicted his work in the 1920s which had given primacy to environmental factors and contextual changes as the primary causes of criminality. In his 1938 essay "Volkscharakter und Verbrechen", he attributed what he called "Negerkriminalität" (Note: The term would have been less offensive to pink skinned German language readers and English language readers in 1938 than it has since become.) not to social factors but to "racial causes", dismissing the option of interpreting the phenomenon in terms of social environment as an "insufficient explanation". The corresponding chapter in his principal work on "Criminal Biology", the first edition of which appeared in 1939, though slightly more carefully differentiated, rehearses what are essentially the same arguments.

==== Criminology textbook: "Basics of Criminal Biology" ====
Exner's textbook on "Criminal Biology" was first published in 1939. According to Richard Wetzell and Karl Peters it was the most important German language criminological textbook since Gustav Aschaffenburg's "Das Verbrechen und seine Bekämpfung", of which the most recent (and third) edition had appeared back in 1923. From a twenty-first century perspective, many view "Criminal Biology" as something of a "pseudoscience". Exner's textbook summarized the state of criminology research at the time and was divided into five sections: (1) "Inherent and environmental [causes of criminality]", (2) "The crime in the life of the people's society", (3) "The Perpetrator", (4) "The deed" and (5) "Applied criminal-biology". There was also an introductory chapter in which Exner affirmed - not for the first time in print - the independence of Criminology from Criminal Justice as two separate academic disciplines. He also acknowledged a core problem of Criminology which continues to trouble scholars: the difficulties arising for Criminology, when viewed as an academic discipline, that arise from constant changes in the definition of "crime". The example he singled out involved homosexuality, under certain justice systems treated as a matter for the individual but treated as a crime under other jurisdictions. Having highlighted the problems of the shifting definition, he went on to insist that the problems were soluble because it remained possible to distil a largely immutable core definition, while separating off for discrete evaluation any shifting outer elements of interest.

Early criticism came from the psychiatrist Hans Walter Gruhle who objected to the book's title. By calling his book "Criminal Biology" Exner was giving credence to politicising trends that enjoyed no academic credibility. The title was also misleading in terms of the book's contents and conclusions, since Exner at no point equates "criminal biology" with "criminal anthropology", regarded by most criminologists as a more reputable academic discipline. For readers able to progress beyond the title, it was quickly evident that Exner was using the term "criminal biology" very broadly, including in it the whole spectrum of criminal sociological, criminal anthropological and criminal psychological research, thereby embracing the entirety of the discipline that has subsequently become widely known as Criminology. He took trouble to define the problem of whether precedence should be given to "inherent factors" or "context and environment" as causes of crime and included the judgment that the issue was a very complex one, but he also took care to avoid arbitrating conclusively on the matter. (Note: "...Das Verhältnis von Anlage und Umwelt ist also durch ein „sowohl als auch“ gekennzeichnet, nicht durch ein striktes „entweder-oder“ ...")

There were three editions of "Basics of Criminal Biology", published in 1939, 1944 and (posthumously) 1949. They all included racist passages. The 1939 and 1944 editions devote a chapter on "Jewish criminality", which the author repeatedly tracks back to "immutable disposition" ("unveränderbares Wesen"). The passages in question are characterised as antisemitic even by the historian Richard Wetzell who otherwise stresses the "moderate character" of the book. In all three editions - including that which appeared in 1949 - he also writes of a "waywardness of the Gypsy race" ("Verwahrlosung der Zigeunerstämme"). The 1949 edition nevertheless appeared under a new title: "Criminology" in place of "Criminal Biology", and with the passages concerned with "Jewish criminality" removed. Even this post-war expurgated version nevertheless retained explicit reference to the racist research of Robert Ritter, the man whose "hereditary-historical" research had been used by the Hitler government to justify persecution and murder of Roma people. The 1949 edition also still described the Yenish people as "wandering good-for-nothings and vagabonds" whose "antisocial actions - even where perpetrators are of mixed blood (mixed racial provenance) - is not to be denied". However, the racist passages in the 1949 edition only occupied a small part of the overall work. In addition, the chapters that dealt with the "inherent criminal disposition" ("Anlage") of perpetrators dealt primarily with discussion of individuals' inherited characteristics in which the concept of "race" played no part.

==== Community Foreigners Act ====
Franz Exner was one of two academics involved in drafting the so-called "Community Foreigners Act" ("Gemeinschaftsfremdengesetz") on behalf of the Ministry for Justice. The other was his colleague Edmund Mezger at the Ludwig-Maximilians-Universität München. The purpose of the new law was to provide legal cover for the "transfer to the SS" of various classes of citizen deemed by the authorities to be non-German. Given that the government actions provided for were already being implemented, it was a piece of retrospective legislation. "Transfer to the SS" was a widely understood euphemism for placement in one of the country's concentration camps. Those whose detention was provided for were Jews, Roma, Sinti, Russians, Ukrainians, Poles and those "non-Jewish Germans" who had been sentenced to jail terms in excess of eight years. The legislation had been under discussion within government circles for some years, and a detailed proposal had been drafted by officials in the Interior Ministry under the direction of Reichsführer Heinrich Himmler as far back as 1939; but following the appointment in 1942 of Otto Georg Thierack as Justice Minister, objections had been lodged (and accepted) that it needed to be redrafted in order to avoid a situation whereby the security services could detain citizens without the involvement of any court. The law itself was intended to come into force on 30 January 1945, following the "final victory" for which the government were preparing. The roles of Exner and Mezger were advisory, and there is no settled view between commentators over how far their advice was reflected in the final draft for the law. Exner's involvement can be reconstructed from his exchange of letters, between March 1943 and June 1943, with Otto Rietzsch, a top government lawyer working in the Ministry for Justice. In his letters Exner comments on the existing draft legislation, comments on the comments provided by his professorial colleague Mezger and introduces some suggested wording of his own. The criminology historian Francisco Muñoz-Conde concentrated on Mezger's contributions in his analysis, but nevertheless raised serious allegations against both Exner and Mezger in connection with their work on the new law. It was precisely because they were both highly respected in their field, they brought to the exercise a wholly inappropriate cloak of legally framed respectability to the internecine eugenicist intentions of the actual "legislators".

A relatively recent study confirms Exner's involvement in drafting the law, but emphasizes the extent to which Exner - in contrast to Edmund Mezger - maintained a critical and distanced position to the entire project His exchange of letters with the Ministry lawyer shows that he was "diligent in terms of the language, but critical of the matter", expressing doubts over the unlawyerly imprecision and conceptual vagueness of the government proposals that provided the starting point for the legislation. He criticised not just the "scope for whimsical and arbitrary interpretation opened up by the imprecision of the language employed", but also the excessive nature of the sanctions envisaged in the draft law. The authors of this new study emphasize the "astonishingly sharp tone" of Exner's criticisms. Importantly, this was the first significant study undertaken following a thorough - albeit still provisional - evaluation of Exner's personal papers, which surfaced only in 2004. It therefore benefitted from a more thorough scrutiny of his correspondence with the Justice Ministry than had hitherto been possible.

Despite his criticisms of the formulation of the draft legislation, it is apparent that Otto Rietzsch, the ministry lawyer responsible for the "Community Foreigners Act" was happy with Exner's work on it. Exner and Mezger were both seen to have suggested valuable improvements to the draft law that the Justice Minister had previously approved. Accordingly, in a letter dated 24 May 1943, Rietzsch approved two payments, each of 1,000 ℛ︁ℳ︁ to each of the two men, in order to cover their expenses incurred by virtue of the work they had contributed. In the same letter Rietsch described Mezger and Exner as "currently our best experts on Criminal Biology".

==== Criticism ====
Exner's role under National Socialism has been evaluated in strikingly disparate ways. In the 1980s, when serious discussion began concerning Criminology and the roles of individual criminologists under National Socialism, the accusation was criticised for having misleadingly entitled the 1939 and 1944 editions of his book on "Criminal Biology" (renamed in the 1949 "Criminology") in order to accommodate the political climate, and in the process conflate Crominology with the pseudoscience of Criminal Biology to satisfy the perceived needs of the criminal justice system. In this context Exner was also accused of having set aside academic self-criticism when preparing, before he died, for the 1949 edition, in which the adjustments for the post-fascist era were confined to the simple omission of the overtly racist passages about the "criminality of the Jews".

Ina Pfennig is an Exner critic. Given the background socio-political demands of other participants in the "discipline" of "criminal biology", it is certainly possible to see Exner as a relatively harmless figure. He did attempt to hang on to the connection between upbringing, environment and personal disposition. His academic work nevertheless displayed a disturbing progression from his earlier focus on criminal justice and criminal-sociology to his later "régime-compliant" statements on "criminal biology". The direct uses and abuses of criminological theories by Hitler's Germany can not and must not remain concealed.

Richard Wetzell comes to a completely different set of conclusions. Exner always prioritized academic objectivity, and he always took care to balance the aetiological factors of "personality" and "environment" in his criminological evaluations. Like many German academics during the twelve Nazi years, Exner succeeded in "doing normal research", uninfluenced by the political currents of the period.

More recently, in rejecting Wetzell's "normal research" thesis, Imanuel Baumann moves a stage further. It was precisely by pursuing a strict academic methodology without actively adhering to "crude biological determinism" that Exner made himself of interest to the Nazis. Baumann is particularly critical of what he sees as Exner's membership of the "criminal biology society", which in its turn aspired to closer collaboration with the "criminal science mainstream" which, from the perspective of government authorities, Exner represented.
