= Franz Exner (disambiguation) =

Franz Exner (1849–1926) was an Austrian physicist.

Franz Exner may also refer to:

- Franz Serafin Exner (philosopher), 1802–1853, see Universal science
- Franz Exner (criminologist), 1881–1947
