= Maximilian Renner =

German zoologist and chronobiologist

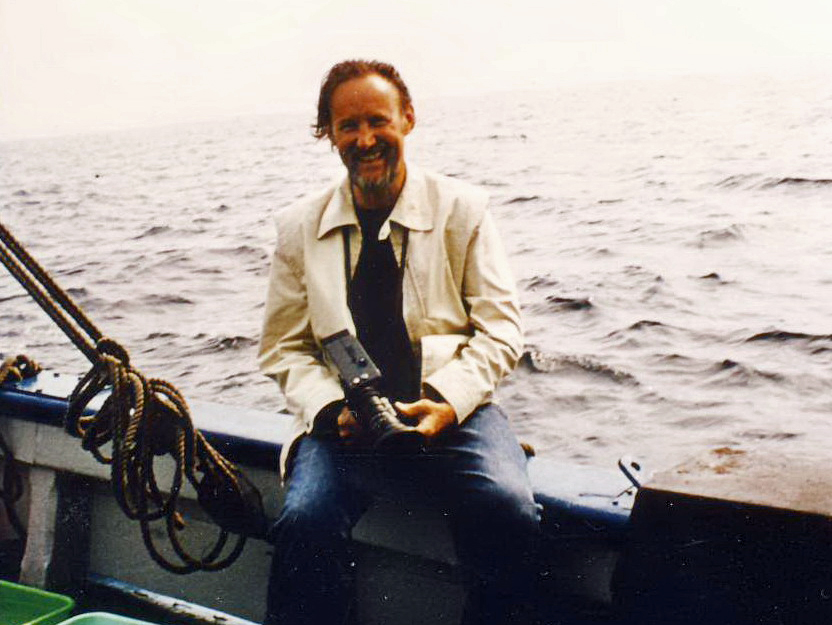

Maximilian Renner (4 November 1919 – 20 March 1990) was a German zoologist and chronobiologist. He worked as a researcher and professor at LMU Munich focusing on "Zeitsinn," or time sense, in bees. His biggest contribution to chronobiology was an experiment in which he explored the concept of “Zeitgedächtnis,” or time memory, by flying bees to different time zones and examining their activity. He continued his research efforts and made various publications on the topic of bee physiology and behavior.

== Life ==
Maximilian Renner was born in Munich on 4 November 1919, and completed his education there. In 1960, he began teaching at LMU Munich. While there he researched the chronobiology in animals, with a particular focus on honey bees (Apis mellifica). In 1967, he became an adjunct professor (außerplanmäßiger Professor), then retired in 1985 as a Professor (C2). Even after his retirement, he still regularly undertook excursions with students to bring them closer to the beauty of nature.

Renner was married and had two daughters. He died at the age of 70 on 20 March 1990.

== Prior research in the field ==
Previous work by other chronobiologists set the stage for Renner's own research. His mentor, Karl Von Frisch won a Nobel Prize in 1973 in Physiology or Medicine for his investigations of sensory perceptions in honey bees. This led Renner's peer, Ingeborg Beling, to study time memory in honey bees. The work done by Von Frish and Beling paved the way for Renner's main discovery of time sense in honey bees.

== Research ==
=== Scientific achievements ===
==== Bee translocation experiments to answer the following questions ====
How is time sense behavior accomplished? Is it through Endogenous or Exogenous mechanisms?

In 1955 Max Renner trained bees in Paris by consistently giving them food at the same time every day. He then flew these bees to New York, in a constantly illuminated environment to see if time sense (coming back to the same spot in 24 hour intervals) could happen without constant exogenous factors, i.e. external factors like sunlight or temperature. The experiment examined whether the change in geographic latitude and different time zones impacted what time the bees would come back for food. He found that bees returned to the same place in roughly 24 hour intervals even in the new location, indicating the presence of an endogenous clock, that is, a regulator intrinsic to the organism independent of the environment.

The next experiment looked at whether the exogenous contributions had an effect on the exogenous clock, looking specifically at how it might have impacted how often bees returned to the same spot. The experiment was conducted by training bees in Long Island, New York and then translocating them to Davis California. This was not done in constant light, to ensure that the position sunlight was not regulating the bee's behavior. There were two time periods where the maximum number of bees returned to the spot after arriving in Davis. Numerous bees returned after of 24 hours, but numerous bees also returned at another time point illustrating an interaction between exogenous and endogenous factors. Max Renner concluded that if the two contributors, internal and external regulators, were in phase they reinforced each other and if they were off phase they competed with one another and impacted behavior.

Is astronomical orientation time compensated?

Max Renner wanted to examine how animals use the position of the sun to orient themselves. He used the experiment of translocating bees from Long Island to Davis to see how bees changed their orientation angle due to the position of the sun even when it was not consistent with their original time zone. He found that bees oriented themselves to figure out what direction to first fly using the sun-azimuth, which takes into account the change in sun speed as it changes position throughout the day.

==== The function of the antenna cleaner of the honey bee ====
With Klaus Schonitzer, another zoologists at LMU Munich, Renner described the antenna cleaning activity of the worker honey bee (Apis mellifica). He discovered they have a structure on their forelegs that they used to clean their antennae with. With a single stroke and only one antenna at a time, these bees used the ipsilateral foreleg to clean the antennae.

==== Secretion glands and the attractiveness of the queen bee ====
In another paper, “The significance of the secretion of the glandular glands for the attractiveness of the bee queen against young workers,” Renner assayed the biological significance of the terit gland secretion of the queen honey bee. He found that worker bees were attracted to the abdominal gland secretion, but it was only effective in conjunction with mandibular gland secretion, at distances over several centimeters. Together they were found to be responsible for the attraction effect.

=== Contributions to science ===
Renner, along with the chronobiologists before him, built a foundation that allowed Collin Pittendrigh to describe the biological clock of Drosophila, and come up with a model of entrainment of circadian rhythms, on the basis of which Pittendrigh was named the father of modern chronobiology.

Some of Renner's other work gave valuable insights into maintenance and behavior of a honey bee, allowing for advancements in beekeeping.

== Publications ==
=== As author ===
==== In German ====
- Analyse der Kopulationsbereitschaft des Weibchens der Feldheuschrecke Euthystira brachyptera Oesk : Beziehgn zum Zustand d. Geschlechtsapparates (German for “Analysis of the Willingness to Copulate in Female Field Grasshopper Euthystira brachyptera: Relations to the Condition of the Sexual Apparatus”) [1951]
- Die Bedeutung des Sekretes der Tergittaschendrüsen für die Attraktivität der Bienenkönigin gegenüber jungen Arbeiterinnen (German for “The Significance of the Secretion of the Glandular Glands for the Attractiveness of the Bee Queen Against Young Workers”)
- Der Zeitsinn der Arthropoden (German for “The Time Sense of Arthropods) [1958]
- Von Biene zu Honig: kleien Kulturgeschichte der Bienenkunde und Imkerei (German for “From Bee to Honey: A Short Cultural History of Apiology and Beekeeping”)[1975]

==== Translated from German ====
- The Scent Gland of the Honey Bee and the Physiological Significance of its Attractant (In German: Das Duftorgan der Honigbiene und die physiologische Bedeutung ihres Lockstoffes) [1960]
- Honey Bee's "Clock" ("Uhr" der Bienen)
- Honey Bee's Time Sense (Zeitsinn der Bienen)
- Keeping of Bees in Closed and Artificially Lighted Rooms (Über die Haltung von Bienen in geschlossenen, künstlich beleuchteten Räumen) [1955]
- New Enquiry into the Physiological Effect of the Scent Glands of the Honey Bee (Neue Untersuchungen über die physiologische Wirkung des Duftorganes der Honigbiene) [1955]
- Time Sense and Astronomic Orientation of the Honey Bee (Zeitsinn und astronomische Orientierung der Honigbiene)

==== Published originally In English ====
- The Contribution of the Honey bee to the Study of Time-Sense and Astronomical Orientation. Cold Spring Harb Symp Quant Biol. 1960;25:361-7.
- With Klaus Schonitzer. The Function of the Antennae Cleaner of the Honey Bee. Apidologie 15 (1984) 23-32

=== As editor ===
- Kükenthal, W. G. Leitfaden für das zoologische Praktikum (German for Handbook for the Zoological Practicum“) [1980]
- Jacobs, Werner. : A Pocket Lexicon Biologie und ökologie der Insekten: ein Taschenlexikon (German for “The Biology and Ecology of Insects”) [1988]
