= Franz Wild =

Austrian opera singer

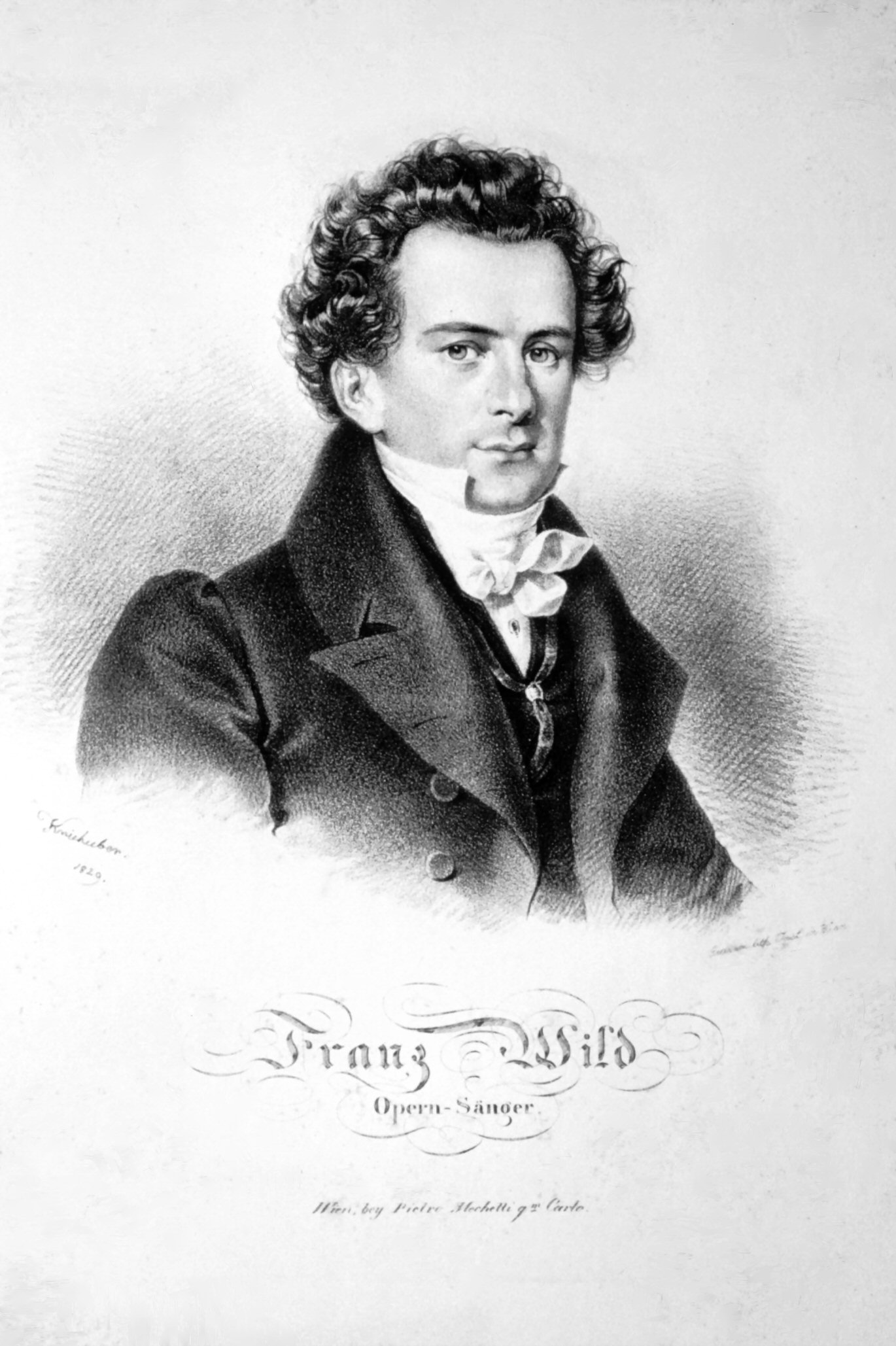
- Lithograph by Josef Kriehuber (1829)
- Born: 31 December 1791; Niederhollabrunn, near Vienna
- Died: 1 January 1860 (aged 68); Vienna
- Resting place: Gräberhain Währinger Park
- Occupation: Operatic tenor

Franz Wild (31 December 1791 – 1 January 1860) was an Austrian operatic tenor. In a successful career he appeared in operas and in concerts in Austria and Germany, and was engaged for many years at the Theater am Kärntnertor in Vienna.

== Life ==
=== Early life and career ===
Wild was born on the New Year's Eve of 1791 in Niederhollabrunn, near Vienna. From 1799 he sang in the choir of Klosterneuburg Monastery, where his musical talent was noted. In 1804 he became a singer in the Wiener Hofmusikkapelle, sent there by Antonio Salieri from whom he received lessons. He attended the Schottengymnasium in Vienna, and was a member of the chorus of the Theater in der Josefstadt, the Theater in der Leopoldstadt, and later in the Theater am Kärntnertor (the Royal Court Theatre) where he was given small solo parts.

Through the mediation of Johann Nepomuk Hummel he was engaged in 1810 with the court orchestra of Nikolaus II, Prince Esterházy at Eisenstadt. In 1811 he was engaged by Ferdinánd Pálffy at the Theater an der Wien, where his debut was as Ramiro in Cinderella by Nicolas Isouard. From 1814 he was also in the court theatre. He had success in many operas including Mozart's The Magic Flute (as Tamino) and Don Giovanni (as Don Ottavio, later as Don Giovanni). In 1814 he married Maria Josepha Theresia von Kirchstetten, an actress at the Theater an der Wien.

=== Darmstadt and Kassel, and return to Vienna ===
He toured Germany with great success in 1816, and in the following year was engaged at the court theatre in Darmstadt, remaining there until 1825, when he became a singer at the court theatre in Kassel. He returned to Vienna in 1829, where he was given a permanent engagement with the court theatre. He subsequently appeared in operas including Hérold's Zampa, Rossini's Otello and William Tell, Donizetti's Belisario, Bellini's Norma and Auber's Fra Diavolo. In the 1840s he was stage director.

He was also active as a concert singer. He appeared elsewhere in Austria and Europe, including St Petersburg in 1839 and London in 1840, where he appeared as Max in Weber's Der Freischütz.

He retired from the court theatre in 1855, and he died in Vienna on the New Year's Day of 1860, one day after his 68th birthday. A statue of Wild, by the sculptor Raimund Novak, was unveiled in May 1865 at a ceremony at his grave in Währinger Cemetery.

== Meetings with Beethoven ==
In his autobiography Blätter der Erinnerung, published in 1860, Wild reminisces about encounters with Ludwig van Beethoven. Wild's performance of Beethoven's song "Adelaide" impressed him such that he was willing to accompany him, and intended to orchestrate the accompaniment; instead he composed for Wild the song "An die Hoffnung" ("To Hope") Op. 94, which he accompanied at a concert.

== Description ==
His biographer in the Biographisches Lexikon des Kaiserthums Oesterreich (1888) wrote: "His sounds were praised for rare tonal beauty, strength and fullness; they always flowed easily, naturally and unforced from his mouth. Although not tall, he was handsome and firmly built, he had eyes full of fire, an expressive face and all the capabilities necessary to make his movements effective, which in themselves were always natural, full of life and quite without exaggeration." His biographer in the Allgemeine Deutsche Biographie (1897) wrote: "Wild's voice had no equal. An indescribable melting and harmonious sound was combined with a strength and fullness, which gave to his voice that pithy timbre that penetrated to the heart with irresistible power, and the ear that heard it once never again forgot it."
