= Ingeborg Beling =

German ethologist (1904–1988)

- Born: 6 March 1904
- Died: 15 January 1988 (aged 83)
- Education: LMU Munich
- Known for: Researching biological clock of the honeybee
- Scientific career
- Fields: Ethology, chronobiology

Ingeborg Beling (6 March 1904 – 15 January 1988) was a German ethologist from the early 20th century who worked in the field of chronobiology. She studied at the Ludwig-Maximilians-Universität München (LMU) under the direction of Karl Von Frisch and is known for her research on the time sense of honey bees. In her research, in 1929, she trained bees to come to a feeding station at a specific time of day, day after day. This contribution ultimately led to the discovery of the bees’ 24-hour biological clock. Because of this achievement, she was regarded as one of the first female chronobiologists. Beyond honeybees, much of Beling's work involved studying behaviors of wasps, fly pupae, etc. Finally, she also did some research in pest control.

== Bee-feeding experiment (1929) ==
A figure in Beling's original publication, which illustrates that bees showed up at the feeding dish only at the trained time. The black box indicates the trained time ("Dressurzeit"). Note that some bees appeared a little early before the trained time, indicating anticipation of food.

Beling wrote in her widely cited 1929 paper, titled "Über das Zeitgedächtnis der Bienen" (“On the Time Memory of Bees”) published in the Journal of Comparative Physiology, that the early observations of Forel, v. Buttel-Reepen and Dobkiewicz promoted her to study the intriguing behavior of bees, termed Zeitgedächtnis, or time memory. In her pioneer experiments, Beling trained a group of individually marked foraging bees to fly to a feeding dish, which was filled with sugar water only at certain times of the day (for example, between 4 and 6 PM). During the testing phase, the dish was empty throughout the day and every visiting bee was recorded. She found that the bees only visited the feeding station at trained time, even when the sugar water was removed. Specifically, Beling found that the bees can anticipate the food by showing up just a little early every morning. Furthermore, she found that bees could be trained to show up at the feeding station at any time of the day, and even for multiple times a day. However, Beling did report that the bees could only be trained to a period close to 24 hours, but not 19 or 48 hours as she tested. These results were still present when Beling controlled potential environmental cues such as humidity, temperature, light and radiation.

== Contributions to chronobiology ==
Beling was able to show that bees have an astonishing memory of time. She found that this time memory is both rigorous (the bees consistently show up at the expected time) and flexible (the bees can be trained to show up any time of night or day, even two or three times a day). Beling found that bees could only train to periods close to 24 hours. This 24-hour rhythm in bees has biological significance in that it is evolutionarily advantageous, helping the bees coordinate with flowers when they are gathering nectar and helping them avoid flying at dangerous predator-filled times of day. The bees' anticipation of the feeding is also advantageous - by knowing the time of day, the bees can prepare themselves for the meal and enable a faster response. Beling's research was unable to conclusively show whether bees have some kind of internal biological clock that is controlling this behavior or if there is some external cue acting as a Zeitgeber that she did not account for in her experiments.

== Related terms ==
Much of the early work in chronobiology was done in Germany, so publications were largely written in German. Some terms created at this time are still being used or often referred to today. The father of chronobiology, Colin Pittendrigh, critiqued these terms, saying that researchers at LMU Munich have trouble letting go of these terms. He argues that ‘training’ and ‘memory’ do not capture the innate components of the behavior.

Word	Meaning	Creator
Dressurzeit	"Training time"	Ingeborg Beling
Zeitgedächtnis	"Time memory"	Auguste Forel
Zeitsinn	"Time sense"	Hugo Berthold von Buttel-Reepen

== Related chronobiologists ==
Beling was one of the earliest chronobiologists who studied the rhythms of bees. Her work grew from the observations of previous scientists (Forel, Buttel-Reepen, von Frisch) and helped inspire further experimentation (Wahl, Renner). Standing on the shoulders of these researchers, Pittendrigh took the field of chronobiology to the modern era by studying biological clocks in fruit flies and is regarded as the father of modern chronobiology.

Researcher	Description
Auguste Forel	Observed honeybees visiting his patio breakfast at same time each day, even when eating indoors
Hugo Berthold von Buttel-Reepen	Observed that bees would show up to buckwheat field at same time each morning
Karl von Frisch	Mentor of Beling, who studied the sensory perception of bees
Oskar Wahl	Colleague of Beling's at LMU Munich, expanded on her work
Max Renner	A chronobiologist also at LMU Munich in the 1960s who flew bees from Paris to New York.
Colin Pittendrigh	Father of modern chronobiology
