= Albert Figdor =

Austrian banker and art collector

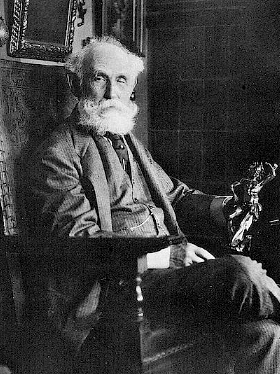
Albert Figdor around 1920

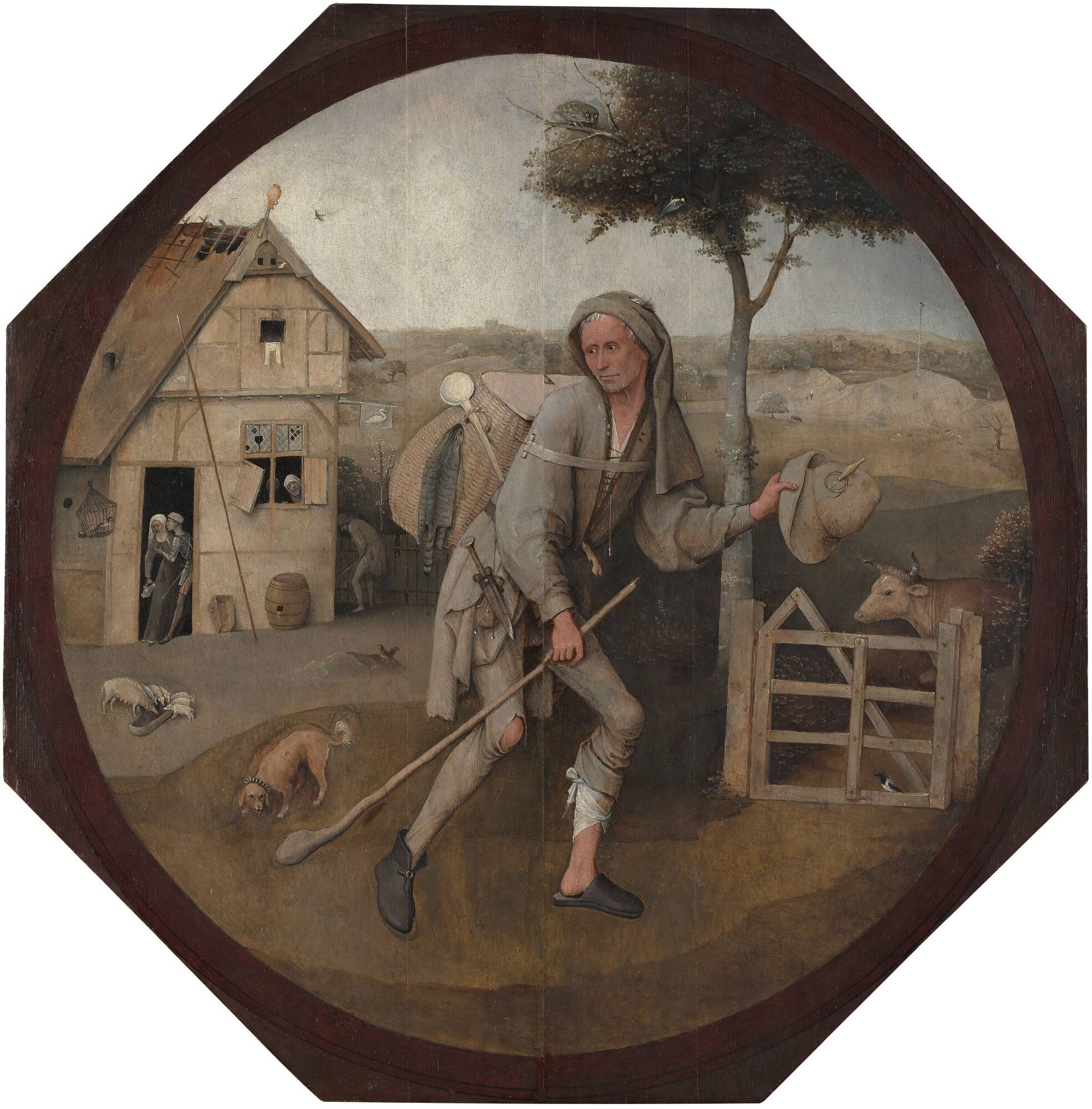
Hieronymus Bosch: The Wayfarer (The Prodigal Son), from the collection of Albert Figdor, purchased at auction in Berlin in 1930 by Jacques Goudstikker.

Albert Figdor (16 May 1843 – 22 February 1927) was an Austrian banker and art collector.

== Life ==
Figdon was born on 16 May 1843 in Baden. Son of the Jewish Viennese merchant and banker Ferdinand Figdor (1805–1876), Albert Figdor studied law, earned a doctorate, and entered his family's banking business, participating, among other ventures, in the financing of the Gotthard Railway. The violinist Joseph Joachim was his cousin. He died on 22 February 1927 in Vienna.

== Art collection ==
Figdor collected a wide range of artworks, with a particular focus on decorative arts. His collection was regarded as one of the most significant private art collections in Europe. He was a member of the supervisory board of the MAK from 1893 to 1898. A planned donation to the Kunsthistorisches Museum in Vienna, which opened in 1891, did not materialize. Figdor bequeathed his collections to Heidelberg; however, export restrictions prevented their removal. Auctions in Vienna and Berlin in 1930, necessitated by these export prohibitions, resulted in only a small portion of the collection entering Viennese museums.

== Legacy ==
Art from the Figdor collection can be found in museums around the world, including the Nelson-Atkins Museum, the Art Institute of Chicago, the Carnegie Museum of Art, and the Metropolitan Museum of Art.

== Literature ==
- Die Sammlung Dr. A. Figdor, Auktionskatalog, 5 Bände, Vienna/Berlin 1930 (online UB Heidelberg)
- "Figdor Albert". In: Österreichisches Biographisches Lexikon 1815–1950 (ÖBL). Vol. 1, Austrian Academy of Sciences, Vienna 1957, p. 313.
- Gustav Otruba (1961). "Figdor, Albert". Neue Deutsche Biographie (in German). Vol. 5. Berlin: Duncker & Humblot. pp. 143–144. (full text online).
- Dr. Albert Figdor und seine Sammlung von Gustav Glück. Zeitschrift für bildende Kunst, 1928, Jahrgang 61 Digizeitschriften e. V.
- Felicitas Heimann-Jelinek, Daniela Schmid: Judaica in der Sammlung Albert Figdor. In: Dies.: "Eine Krone mit verschiedenen Verzierungen samt Glöckl und Steinen". Judaica-Sammlungen in Österreich. Böhlau, Vienna 2024, ISBN 978-3-205-22105-0, pp. 25–38.
