= Otto Zuckerkandl =

Austro-Hungarian urologist and surgeon

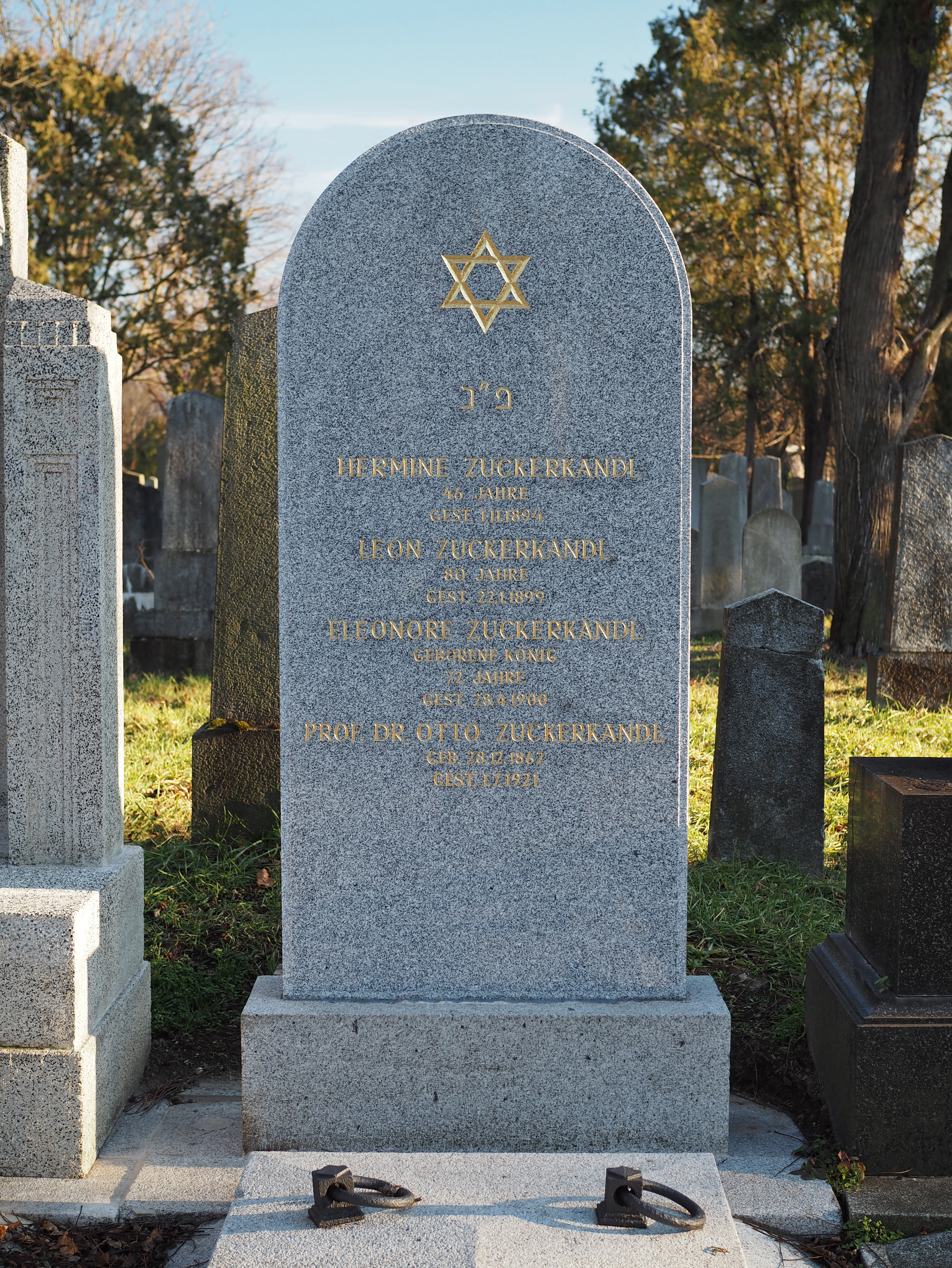
Otto Zuckerkandl family grave, Vienna

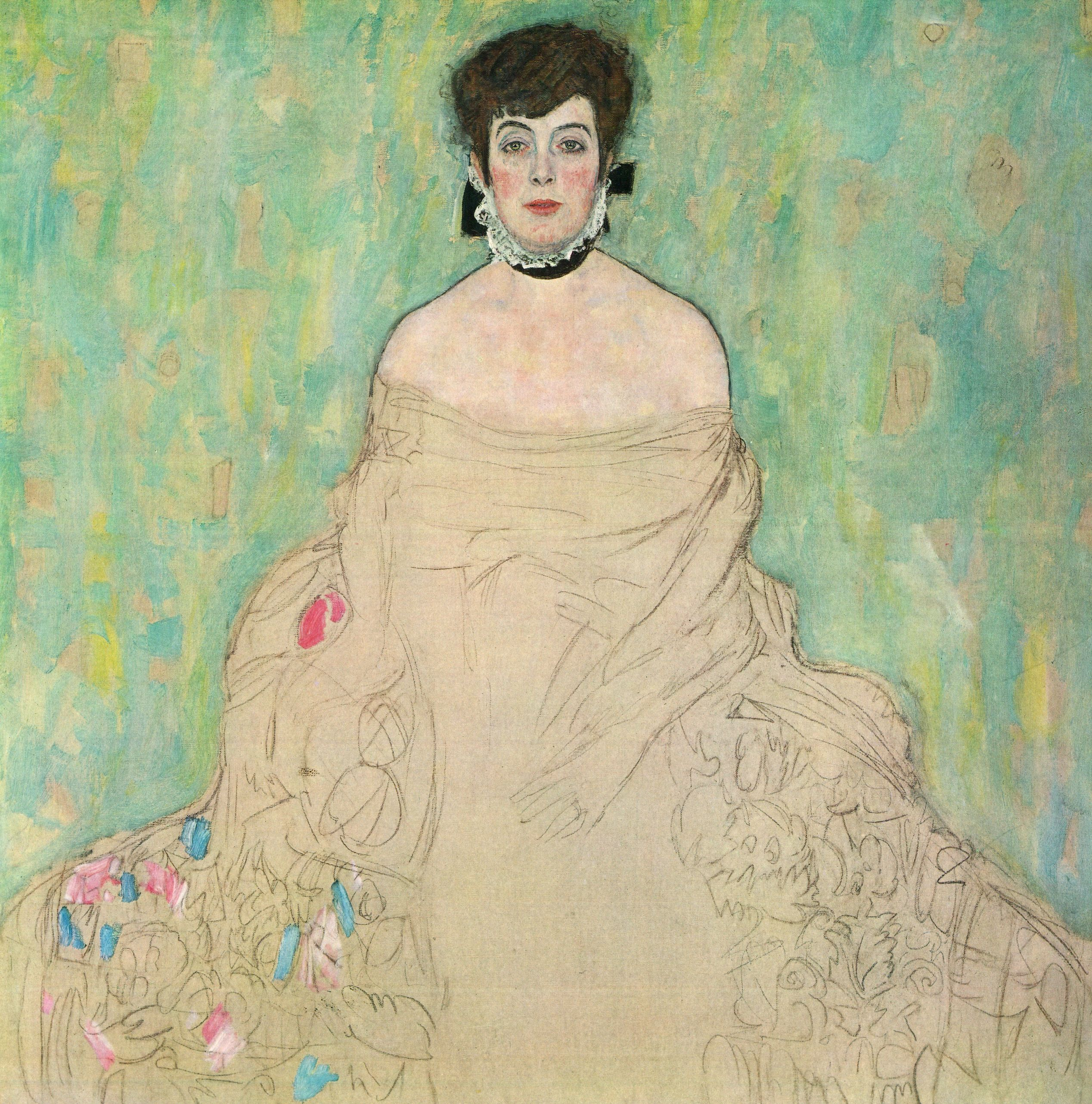
Gustav Klimt, Portrait of Amalie Zuckerkandl

Otto Zuckerkandl (28 December 1861, Raab – 1 July 1921, Vienna) was an Austro-Hungarian urologist and surgeon. He was a younger brother of anatomist Emil Zuckerkandl (1849–1910).

In 1884 he obtained his medical doctorate from the University of Vienna. Beginning in 1889, he became an assistant to surgeon Eduard Albert (1841–1900) in Vienna, two years later serving at the Vienna General Hospital under the guidance of Leopold von Dittel (1815–1898). In 1892 he became a lecturer in surgery, afterwards gaining promotions as an associate professor (1904) and full professor (1912). From 1902 onward, he was associated with the Rothschild-Spital in Vienna.

Zuckerkandl specialized in diseases of the urethra, bladder, and prostate. In 1919, he was a founder and first president of the Wiener Urological Society (in 1936 renamed the Österreichische Gesellschaft für Urologie, Austrian Society of Urology). The "Zuckerkandl Preis" is an award for special achievements in the field of urology.

An unfinished portrait (1917–1918) of his wife Amalie, painted by Gustav Klimt, is now kept at the Belvedere in Vienna. Amalie was a Christian who converted to Judaism to marry Zuckerlandl. The couple were divorced after the First World War. During the Second World War she and her daughter Nora were deported by the Nazis to the Bełżec extermination camp where they were murdered.

== Writings ==
He was the author of Atlas und Grundriss der chirurgischen Operationslehre (1897), an influential manual/atlas on surgery that was published over numerous editions. It was translated into English in 1898 as "Atlas and epitome of operative surgery". His other principal works include:

- Handbuch der Urologie, 1904–06 (with Anton von Frisch) – Textbook of urology.
- Die lokalen Erkrankungen der Harnblase, 1899 – Local diseases of the urinary bladder.
- Studien zur Anatomie und Klinik der Prostatahypertrophie, 1922 (with Julius Tandler) – Treatise on prostatic hypertrophy.
