= Anton von Frisch =

Austrian urologist

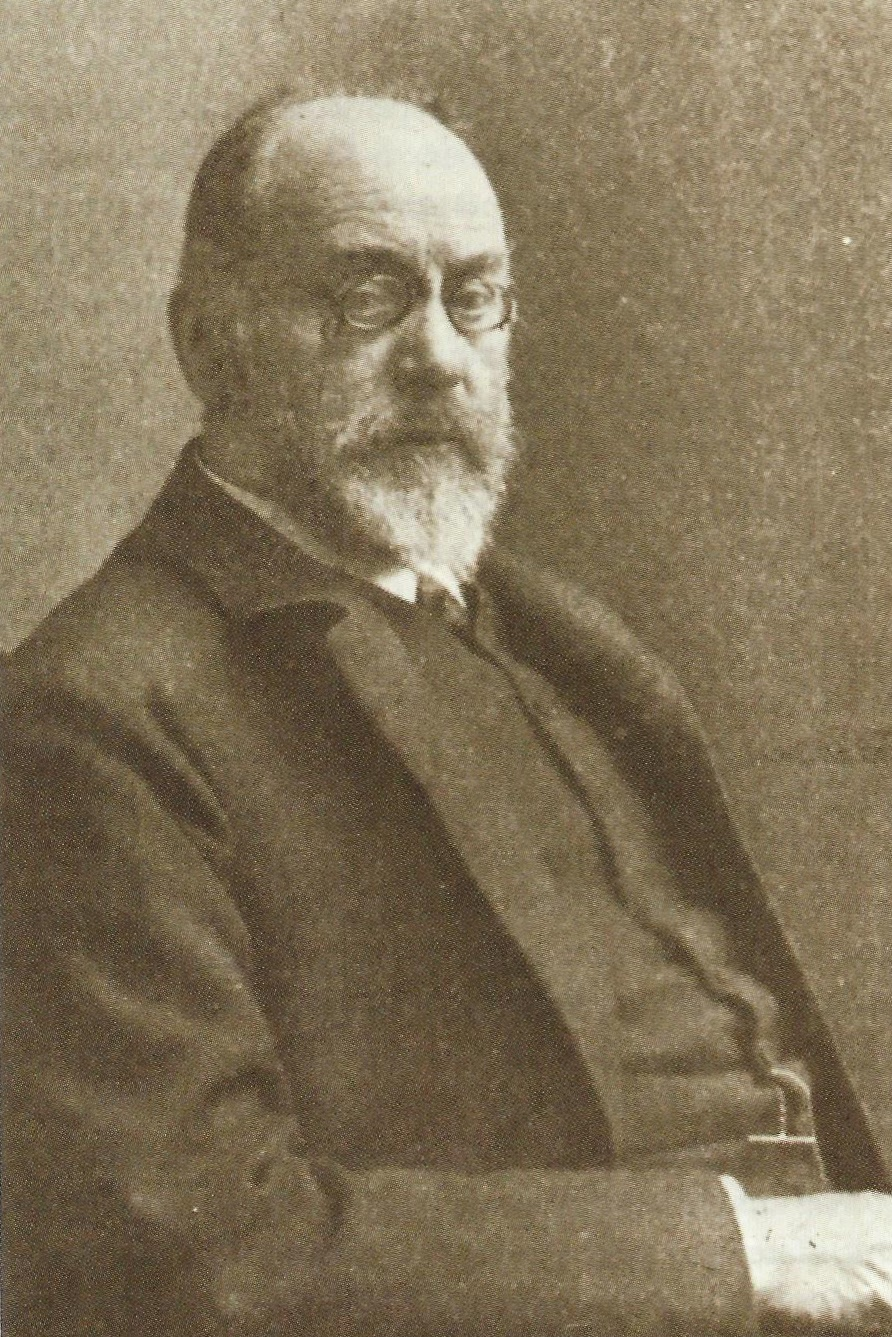
Anton von Frisch

Anton von Frisch (16 February 1849 – 24 May 1917), full name Anton Ritter von Frisch, was an Austrian urologist. Frisch was born in Vienna.

He studied at the Pasteur Institute in Paris, afterwards returning to Vienna, where he served as a demonstrator under Josef Hyrtl (1810–1894) and as an assistant to Theodor Billroth (1829–1894). In 1874 he became a professor at the University of Vienna. In 1899 he was appointed head of the department of urology at the Allgemeine Poliklinik Wien (General Polyclinic – Vienna). Through Frisch's efforts, urology became recognized as an independent subject at the medical faculty in Vienna.

In 1882 he first identified Klebsiella rhinoscleromatis, an organism that is the cause of rhinoscleroma. With urologist Otto Zuckerkandl (1861–1921), he was co-author of the three volume Handbuch der Urologie (1904–06).

Frisch married Marie Exner (1844-1925), the sister of physiologist Sigmund Exner (1846-1926). Ethologist Karl von Frisch (1886-1982) was his son.
