= Karl von Frisch =

German-Austrian ethologist (1886–1982)

Karl Ritter von Frisch ForMemRS
- In traditional dress, with his honey bees
- Born: 20 November 1886; Vienna, Austria-Hungary (now Austria)
- Died: 12 June 1982 (aged 95); Munich, Bavaria, West Germany (now Germany)
- Education: University of Vienna (PhD, 1910); Ludwig-Maximilians-Universität München
- Known for: Behaviour and perception of bees
- Spouse(s): Margarete, née Mohr
- Parents: Anton von Frisch (father); Marie Exner (mother)
- Awards: Nobel Prize in Physiology or Medicine (1973); Balzan Prize for Biology (1962); Kalinga Prize (1958); Magellanic Premium (1956); Lieben Prize (1921)
- Scientific career
- Fields: Ethology
- Workplaces: Rostock University, Breslau University, Ludwig-Maximilians-Universität München, University of Graz
- Notable students: Ingeborg Beling, Maximilian Renner

Karl Ritter von Frisch (20 November 1886 – 12 June 1982) was a German-Austrian ethologist who received the Nobel Prize in Physiology or Medicine in 1973, along with Nikolaas Tinbergen and Konrad Lorenz.

His work centered on investigations of the sensory perceptions of the honey bee and he was one of the first to translate the meaning of the waggle dance. His theory, described in his 1927 book Aus dem Leben der Bienen/ (English: "From the Life of Bees", published in the UK and United States as The Dancing Bees), was disputed by other scientists and met with widespread skepticism at the time, only decades later being appreciated as both zoologically accurate and an important step in development of animal behavioral study, and the wider history of biology.

== Early life ==
Karl Ritter von Frisch was the son of the surgeon and urologist Anton von Frisch, by his marriage to Marie Exner. Karl was the youngest of four sons, all of whom became university professors. Von Frisch was of partial Jewish heritage.

Karl studied at the University of Vienna under Hans Leo Przibram and in Munich under Richard von Hertwig, initially in the field of medicine, but later turned to the natural sciences. He received his doctorate in 1910 and in the same year started work as an assistant in the zoology department of the Ludwig-Maximilians-Universität München.

== Career ==
In 1912, he became a lecturer in zoology and comparative anatomy there; and in 1919 was promoted to a professorship. His research on honeybees was continued by his student Ingeborg Beling. In 1921 he went to Rostock University as a professor of zoology and director of an institute. In 1923 he accepted the offer of a chair at Breslau University, returning in 1925 to the Ludwig-Maximilians-Universität München, where he became the head of the institute of zoology.

Von Frisch attracted negative attention from the Nazi regime, among other things for employing Jewish assistants, including many women. Eventually Frisch was forced into retirement, but the decision was reversed because of his research on nosema infections in bees. In the original edition of his book "Du und das Leben" ("You and Life") he wrote in support of the Nazi Law for the Prevention of Hereditarily Diseased Offspring.

The institute of zoology was destroyed in the Second World War, and in 1946, Frisch went to work at the University of Graz, remaining there until 1950, when he returned to the reopened Munich institute. He retired in 1958 but continued his research.

== Personal life ==
Karl Ritter von Frisch married Margarete, née Mohr, who died in 1964. Their son, Otto Ritter von Frisch, was director of the State Natural History Museum in Braunschweig, Germany between 1977 and 1995.

== Research ==
Frisch studied aspects of animal behaviour, including animal navigation, in the Carniolan honey bee (Apis mellifera carnica), a subspecies of the European honey bee.

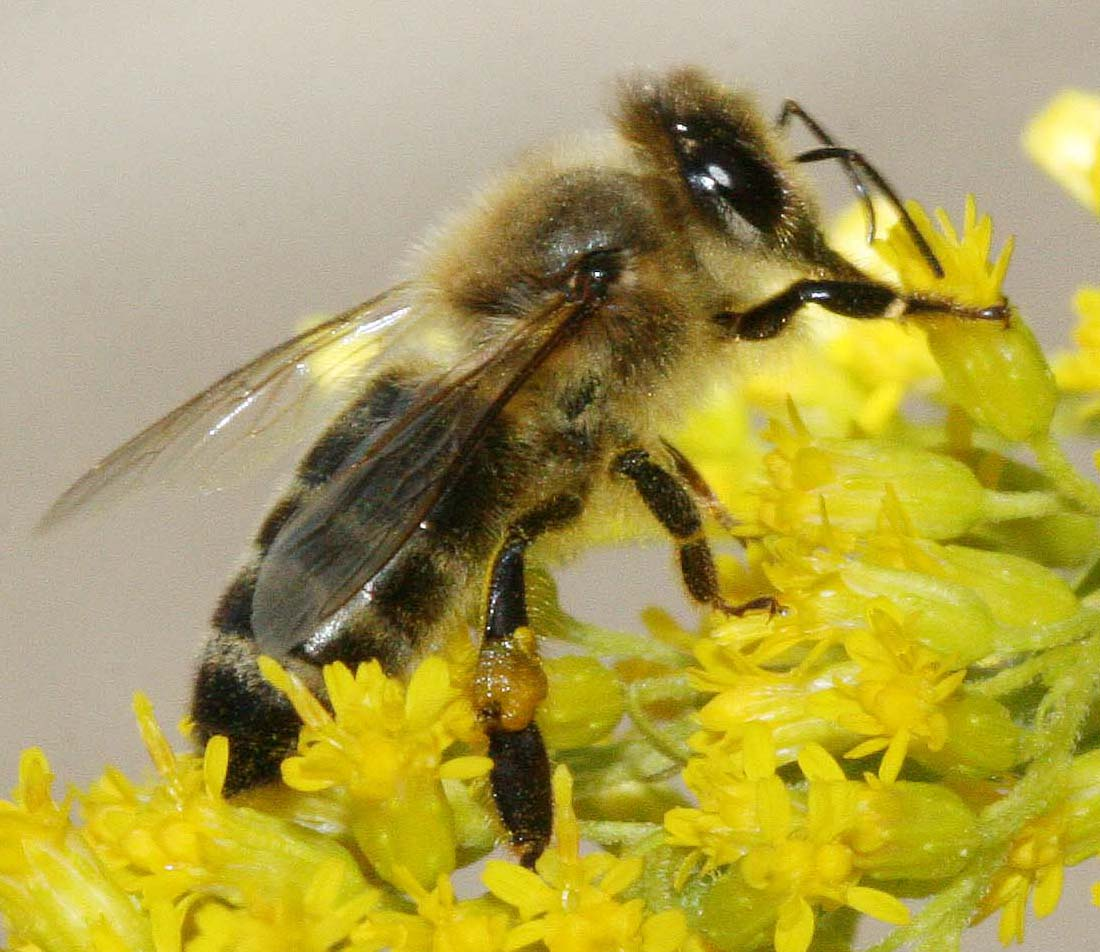
Carniolan honey bee on a goldenrod flower head

=== Bee perception ===
Frisch discovered that bees can distinguish various blossoming plants by their scent, and that each bee is "flower constant". Surprisingly, their sensitivity to a "sweet" taste is only slightly stronger than in humans. He thought possible that a bee's spatial sense of smell arose from the firm coupling of its olfactory sense with its tactile sense.

Frisch was the second to demonstrate that honey bees had color vision (first was Charles Henry Turner), which he accomplished by using classical conditioning. He trained bees to feed on a dish of sugar water set on a colored card. He then set the colored card in the middle of a set of gray-toned cards. If the bees see the colored card as a shade of gray, then they will confuse the blue card with at least one of the gray-toned cards; bees arriving to feed will visit more than one card in the array. On the other hand, if they have color vision, then the bees visit only the blue card, as it is visually distinct from the other cards. A bee's color perception is comparable to that of humans, but with a shift away from the red toward the ultraviolet part of the spectrum. For that reason bees cannot distinguish red from black (colorless), but they can distinguish the colors white, yellow, blue and violet. Color pigments which reflect UV radiation expand the spectrum of colors which can be differentiated. For example, several blossoms which may appear to humans to be of the same yellow color will appear to bees as having different colors (multicolored patterns) because of their different proportions of ultraviolet.

Frisch's experiments caused a reaction from established professor Carl von Hess, who had concluded in his 1912 book Vergleichende Physiologie des Gesichtssinnes (Comparative Physiology of Vision) that invertebrates and fish were colour-blind. He published an experimental paper in 1913 (before Frisch could publish) and disputed Frisch's knowledge, professionalism and conclusions, and those of John Lubbock before him. Frisch highlighted the errors in Hess's experimental method and asked him to desist.

Frisch's investigation of a bee's powers of orientation were significant. He discovered that bees can recognize the desired compass direction in three different ways: by the Sun, by the polarization pattern of the blue sky, and by the Earth's magnetic field, whereby the Sun is used as the main compass, with the alternatives reserved for the conditions arising under cloudy skies or within a dark beehive.

Light scattered in a blue sky forms a characteristic pattern of partially polarized light which is dependent on the position of the Sun and invisible to human eyes. With a UV receptor in each of the lens units of a compound eye, and a UV filter oriented differently in each of these units, a bee is able to detect this polarization pattern. A small piece of blue sky is enough for a bee to recognize the pattern changes occurring over the course of a day. This provides not only directional but also temporal information.

Frisch proved that variations in the position of the Sun over the course of a day provided bees with an orientation tool. They use this capability to obtain information about the progression of the day deep inside a dark beehive comparable to what is known from the position of the Sun. This makes it possible for the bees to convey always up-to-date directional information during their waggle dance, without having to make a comparison with the Sun during long dance phases. This provides them not only with alternative directional information, but also with additional temporal information.

Bees have an internal clock with three different synchronization or timekeeping mechanisms. If a bee knows the direction to a feeding place found during a morning excursion, it can also find the same location, as well as the precise time at which this source provides food, in the afternoon, based on the position of the sun.

Based on the magnetic field, the alignment of the plane of a honeycomb under construction (e.g., the new honeycomb of a swarm) will be the same as that of the home hive of the swarm, according to Frisch. By experiment, even deformed combs bent into a circle can be produced.

The vertical alignment of the honeycomb is attributed by Frisch to the ability of bees to identify what is vertical with the help of their head used as a pendulum together with a ring of sensory cells in the neck.

=== Dances as language ===
Knowledge about feeding places can be relayed from bee to bee. The means of communication is a special dance of which there are two forms:

==== Round dance ====
The "round dance" provides the information that there is a feeding place in the vicinity of the beehive at a distance between 50 and 100 meters (yards), without the particular direction being given. By means of close contact among the bees it also supplies information about the type of food (blossom scent).

The foraging bee ... begins to perform a kind of "round dance". On the part of the comb where she is sitting she starts whirling around in a narrow circle, constantly changing her direction, turning now right, now left, dancing clockwise and anti-clockwise, in quick succession, describing between one and two circles in each direction. This dance is performed among the thickest bustle of the hive. What makes it so particularly striking and attractive is the way it infects the surrounding bees; those sitting next to the dancer start tripping after her, always trying to keep their outstretched feelers on close contact with the tip of her abdomen. ... They take part in each of her maneuverings so that the dancer herself, in her mad wheeling movements, appears to carry behind her a perpetual comet's tail of bees.

==== Waggle dance ====
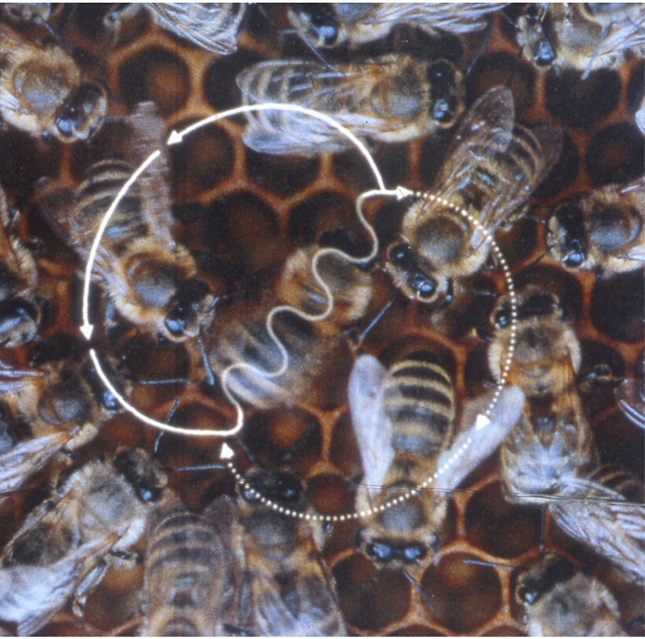
The waggle dance

Interpretation of the waggle dance: direction relative to the sun is shown by angle to the vertical; distance by the time taken on the central stretch.

The "waggle dance" is used to relay information about more distant food sources. In order to do this, the dancing bee moves forward a certain distance on the vertically hanging honeycomb in the hive, then traces a half circle to return to her starting point, whereupon the dance begins again. On the straight stretch, the bee "waggles" with her posterior. The direction of the straight stretch contains the information about the direction of the food source, the angle between the straight stretch and the vertical being precisely the angle which the direction of flight has to the position of the sun. The distance to the food source is relayed by the time taken to traverse the straight stretch, one second indicating a distance of approximately one kilometer (1000 yards) (so the speed of the dance is inversely related to the actual distance). The other bees take in the information by keeping in close contact with the dancing bee and reconstructing its movements. They also receive information via their sense of smell about what is to be found at the food source (type of food, pollen, propolis, water) as well as its specific characteristics. The orientation functions so well that the bees can find a food source with the help of the waggle dance even if there are hindrances they must detour around like an intervening mountain.

As to a sense of hearing, Frisch could not identify this perceptive faculty, but it was assumed that vibrations could be sensed and used for communication during the waggle dance. Confirmation was later provided by Dr. Jürgen Tautz, a bee researcher at Würzburg University's Biocenter.

==== "Dialects" ====
The linguistic findings described above were based on Frisch's work primarily with the Carnica variety of bees. Investigations with other varieties led to the discovery that language elements were variety-specific, so that how distance and direction information is relayed varies greatly.

=== Other work ===
Frisch's honey bee work included the study of the pheromones that are emitted by the queen bee and her daughters, which maintain the hive's very complex social order. Outside the hive, the pheromones cause the male bees, or drones, to become attracted to a queen and mate with her. Inside the hive, the drones are not affected by the odor.

== Honors and decorations ==
- Lieben Prize (1921)
- Pour le Mérite for Arts and Sciences (1952)
- Foreign Honorary Member of the American Academy of Arts and Sciences (1952)
- Elected a Foreign Member of the Royal Society (ForMemRS) in 1954
- Honorary ring of Vienna (1956)
- Kalinga Prize for the Popularization of Science (1958)
- Bavarian Order of Merit (1959)
- Foreign Member of the Royal Netherlands Academy of Arts and Sciences (1959)
- Austrian Medal for Science and Art (1960)
- Balzan Prize for Biology "For having consecrated his entire life to experimenting on thousands of bees, thus discovering a true language of gestures for communication and opening new insights into the knowledge of insect behaviour" (motivation of the Balzan General Prize Committee). (1962)
- Nobel Prize for Physiology or Medicine, with Konrad Lorenz and Nikolaas Tinbergen for his achievements in comparative behavioral physiology and pioneering work in communication between insects. (1973)
- Grand Merit Cross with Star and Sash of the Federal Republic of Germany (Großes Verdienstkreuz mit Stern und Schulterband) (1974)
- Bavarian Maximilian Order for Science and Art (1981)
- In his honor, the Karl Ritter von Frisch Medal of the German Zoological Society (Deutschen Zoologischen Gesellschaft, DZG), is awarded every two years to scientists whose work is distinguished by extraordinary zoological achievements which represent an integration of insights from several different biological disciplines. It is Germany's most important science prize in zoology and includes prize money of 10,000 euros.
- Member of the German Academy of Sciences Leopoldina – National Academy of Sciences
- Honorary doctorates from a number of universities, honorary membership of numerous academies and scientific societies

== Publications ==
=== In German ===
- Der Farben- und Formensinn der Bienen. In: Zoologische Jahrbücher (Physiologie) 35, 1–188, (1914–15)
- Über den Geruchssinn der Bienen und seine blütenbiologische Bedeutung. In: Zoologische Jahrbücher (Physiologie) 37, 1–238 (1919)
- Über die ‚Sprache' der Bienen. Eine tierpsychologische Untersuchung. In: Zoologische Jahrbücher (Physiologie) 40, 1–186 (1923)
- Aus dem Leben der Bienen. Springer Verlag Berlin (1927)
- Untersuchung über den Sitz des Gehörsinnes bei der Elritze. In: Zeitschrift für vergleichende Physiologie 17, 686–801 (1932), it R. Stetter
- Über den Geschmacksinn der Bienen. In: Zeitschrift für vergleichende Physiologie 21, 1–156 (1934)
- Du und das Leben – Eine moderne Biologie für Jedermann. (1936) [literally, You and Life: A Modern Biology for Everyman]
- Über einen Schreckstoff der Fischhaut und seine biologische Bedeutung. In: Zeitschrift für vergleichende Physiologie 29, 46–145 (1941)
- Die Tänze der Bienen. In: Österreichische Zoologische Zeitschrift 1, 1–48 (1946)
- Die Polarisation des Himmelslichtes als orientierender Faktor bei den Tänzen der Bienen. In: Experientia (Basel) 5, 142–148 (1949)
- Die Sonne als Kompaß im Leben der Bienen. In: Experientia (Basel) 6, 210–221 (1950)
- Das kleine Insektenbuch. Insel Verlag (1961)
- Tanzsprache und Orientierung der Bienen. Springer-Verlag Berlin/Heidelberg/New York (1965)
- Aus dem Leben der Bienen. Springer-Verlag Berlin/Heidelberg/New York (1927; 9. Auflage 1977), ISBN 3-540-08212-3
- Erinnerungen eines Biologen. Springer-Verlag, Berlin/Göttingen/Heidelberg 1957 (Autobiographie)
- Die Tanzsprache der Bienen. Originaltonaufnahmen 1953–1962, hrsg. v. Klaus Sander. 2-CD-Set. supposé, Köln 2005. ISBN 978-3-932513-56-5
- Tiere als Baumeister. Frankfurt a.M., Ullstein, 1974. 309 Seiten. 105 Zeichnungen & 114 Photographien. ISBN 3-550-07028-4

=== In English ===
- The Dancing Bees: An Account of the Life and Senses of the Honey Bee, Harvest Books New York (1953), a translation of Aus dem Leben der Bienen, 5th revised edition, Springer Verlag
- About Biology, Oliver & Boyd (1962), a translation of Du Und Das Leben
- Animal Architecture (originally published as Tiere Als Baumeister.) New York, Helen and Kurt Wolff. (ISBN 0-15-107251-5) (1974 1st edition)
- The Dance Language and Orientation of Bees, Cambridge, Mass., Harvard University Press (1967), a translation of Tanzsprache und Orientierung der Bienen
